= Arsenite Schism =

13th century conflict in the Byzantine Church

The Arsenite Schism was a conflict dividing the Byzantine Church between 1265 and 1310. The schism began due to conflict between the Patriarch of Constantinople Arsenios Autoreianos and the Byzantine Emperor Michael VIII Palaiologos.

== Background ==
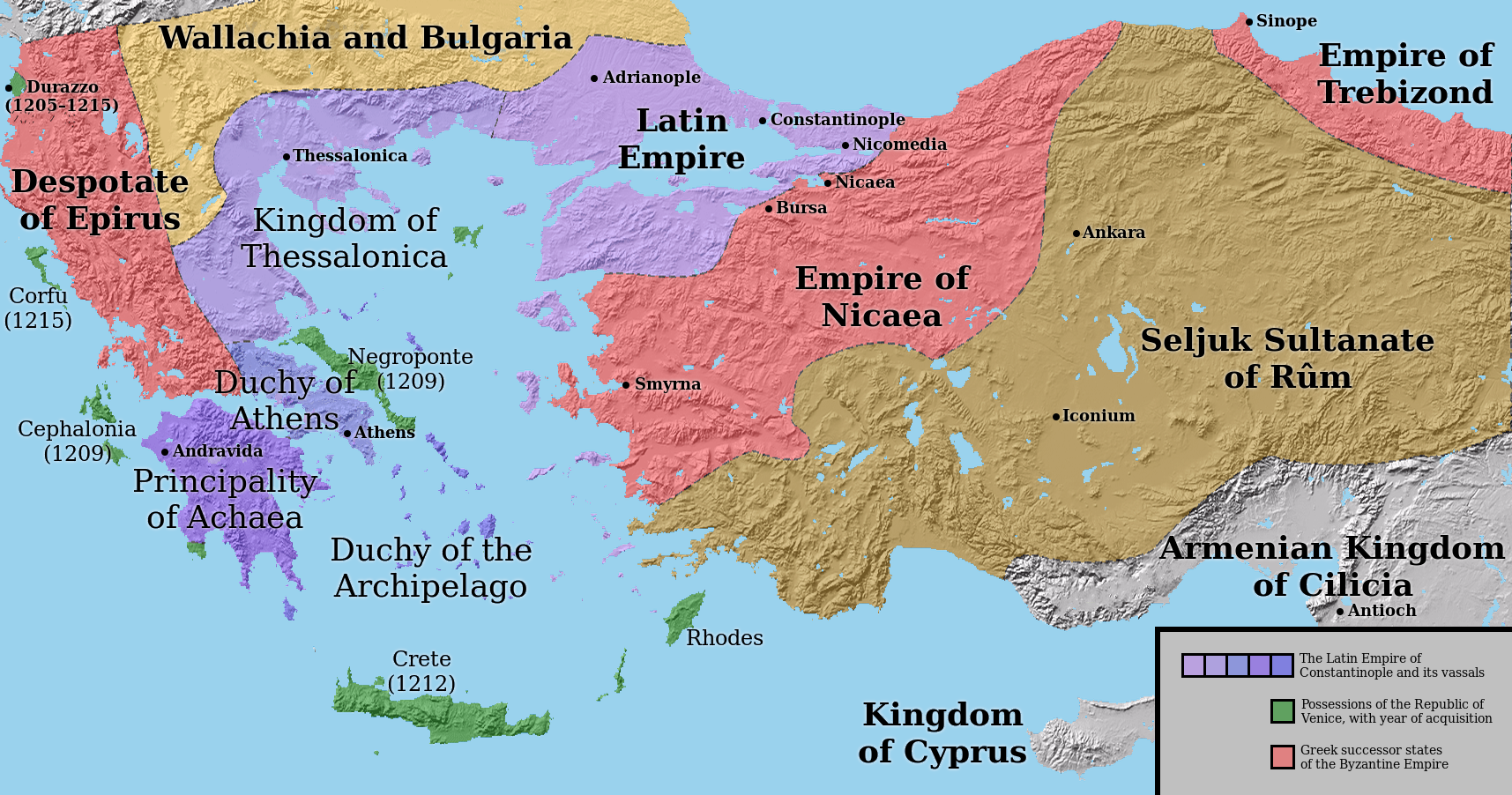
Military situation of Greece after 1204

During the Fourth Crusade in 1204–1205, a coalition of western knights and Venetian merchants captured Constantinople, and seized large chunks of the Byzantine Empire. While the Venetians took the Ionian islands, the Aegean islands and Crete, the Crusaders transformed their conquered mainland Byzantine territories composed of Greeks adhering to Eastern Orthodoxy into Catholic polities ruled by the French like Latin Empire of Constantinople, Kingdom of Thessalonica, Duchy of Athens & Principality of Achaea alongside establishing a Latin Patriarchate with the long-term goals of bringing the Greeks under the jurisdiction of the Pope. Orthodox resistance survived in the unconquered Byzantine lands like the Despotate of Epirus and the Empire of Trebizond, aided by the Orthodox Tsardom of Bulgaria. The Byzantine aristocrat Theodore I Laskaris (r. 1205–1221) took control of the Byzantine lands in Asia Minor, transforming them in a Byzantine successor state, the Empire of Nicaea. With his active support, in 1208 the Eastern Orthodox clergy exiled from Constantinople by its new Catholic rulers elected Michael IV Autoreianos (d. 1212) as the new Greek Patriarch in opposition the Latin Patriarch Thomas Morosini. The new Patriarch established his seat in Nicaea, and crowned Theodore emperor.

== Beginning of the schism ==
In 1258, the Niceaen emperor Theodore II died, leaving the crown to his eight-year old son John IV. His guardianship was shared between the Patriarch Arsenius and the aristocrat George Mouzalon. However, within a few days, Mouzalon was killed in a palace coup orchestrated by the military leader Michael Palaiologos. Michael was not content at being named only co-emperor to John, he wanted to usurp the imperial position for himself, which was opposed by Arsenius. Arsenius had worked to protect the rights of the young emperor, at one point insisting that John and Michael exchange mutual oaths of loyalty. He also insisted that at the double coronation John should be crowned first, which Michael saw as a serious barrier to his final usurpation. Pressure was put upon the patriarch to allow Palaiologos to be crowned alone, and even the young emperor was threatened. The patriarch found no support from the bishops assembled: except for two prelates, all believed that Palaiologos had the right to be crowned first. Arsenius at last conceded the point and crowned Michael as basileus Michael VIII on 1 January 1259, while John received only a special head-dress. Even though John was technically coronoated, but in reality he was powerless, being completely overshadowed by Michael.

The ceremony completed, Arsenius took refuge in the monastery of Paschasius, retaining his office of patriarch but refusing to discharge its duties. Nicephorus II of Constantinople was appointed in his stead. On 25 July 1261, Michael VIII, reconquered Constantinople from the Latin Emperor Baldwin II & invited Arsenius to return to the now position of Patriarch (vacant following the death of Nicephorus II in February that year) now restored in Constantinople. Arsenius conducted a coronation for Michael VIII at Hagia Sophia on 15th August 1261, while John IV Laskaris, still technically emperor, was left behind at Nicaea. John IV was later blinded on Michael's orders on his eleventh birthday at Christmas 1261. On receiving this news, Arsenius went so far as to excommunicate Emperor Michael VIII Palaiologos for his breach of promise. After attempting to frighten the patriarch into rescinding the excommunication by threatening to appeal to the Pope, Michael VIII at last convened a synod, had Arsenius deposed towards the end of May 1265 sent him into exile. There he died some years afterwards. The new patriarch Joseph I of Constantinople issued a pardon to the Emperor, which enraged the supporters of Arsenius within the church hierarchy, thereby beginning the Arsenite schism.

== Catholic angle ==
Although Michael VIII had expelled the Catholics from Constantinople following his recoquest, he nevertheless approached Pope Clement IV about the possibility of healing the Great Schism. For Michael VIII, who was threatened by the ambitions of Charles I of Anjou, the Union was the sole instrument for preventing a full-scale assault by the Catholic powers on his empire, but the Byzantine clergy and people almost universally opposed the concessions made to the Papacy on matters of doctrine and Papal supremacy. In 1273, Joseph I swore an oath not to accept the Union under the terms set out by the Pope, and in early 1274, as the Byzantine delegation prepared to travel to Italy to effect the Union, he retired from his official duties to the Church of St. George of Samatya.

Byzantine delegates participated in the Second Council of Lyon, where a formal act of union was declared by Pope Gregory X, which involved the Greek delegates accepting the filioque clause. When this news reached back to Constantinople, Joseph I resigned from his office on 9 January 1275 in protest, retiring to the Monastery of Anaplous and later to the town of Chele on the Black Sea coast, before returning to Constantinople in summer 1280 to the Monastery of Kosmidion. While the union was opposed at all levels of society, it was especially opposed by the greater populace, led by the monks and the adherents of the deposed Patriarch Arsenios, known as the Arsenites. One of the chief anti-unionist leaders was Michael's own sister Eulogia, who fled to the court of her daughter Maria Palaiologina Kantakouzene, Tsarina of the Bulgars, from where she intrigued unsuccessfully against Michael. More serious was the opposition from the Despots of Epirus, Nikephoros I Komnenos Doukas and his half-brother John I Doukas: they posed as the defenders of Orthodoxy and gave support to the anti-unionists fleeing Constantinople. Michael at first responded with comparative leniency, hoping to win the anti-unionists through persuasion, but eventually the virulence of the protests led him to resort to force. Many anti-unionists were blinded or exiled. Two prominent monks, Meletios and Ignatios, were punished: the first had his tongue cut out, the second was blinded. Even imperial officials were harshly treated, and the death penalty was decreed even for simply reading or possessing pamphlets directed against the Emperor. "From the intensity of these disorders, tantamount almost to civil wars," concludes Geanakoplos, "it might appear that too great a price had been paid for the sake of union."

The religious situation only worsened for Michael. The Arsenite party found widespread support amongst the discontented in the Anatolian provinces, and Michael responded there with similar viciousness: according to Vryonis, "These elements were either removed from the armies or else, alienated, they deserted to the Turks".

The new Patriarch of Constantinople, John Bekkos had initially promised not to reply to the pamphlets that were being circulated against the ecclesiastical union, by the latter years of Michael VIII's reign he had changed his mind about this, and began "holding numerous synods, calling all and sundry, and dug up books and published many others", defending the union on theological grounds, arguing the compatibility of the Latin doctrine with Greek patristic tradition. The effect of this was further to alienate most of the Greek clergy against him, bolstering the support for the Arsenites.

== Resolution ==
Although Pope Martin IV had excommunicated Michael VIII, largely at the instigation of Charles I of Anjou on 10 April 1281, Michael and Patriarch John continued to espouse pro-union stances. Following the death of Michael VIII in 1282, his son Andronikos II reversed his father's ecclesiastical policies, deposed John Bekkos and recalled Joseph I to the patriarchate (31 December 1282). Joseph I's poor health however forced him to resign his office shortly before his death on 23 March 1283. The union between the two churches was formally repudiated by the Council of Blachernae in 1285, organised by Andronikos and the new Patriarch, Gregory II. Although the union had been called off, the Arsenites refused to return back to the fold of the Patriarchate, which continued to vacilitate between pro-unionism and anti-unionism. The "Arsenite schism" lasted till 1310, when a reconciliation was pronounced by the patriarch Nephon I of Constantinople. This was followed a relatively short-lived schism by Theoleptos of Philadelphia which was resolved in 1317.

== Legacy ==
The Arsenite schism revealed the deep unpopularity of the prospect of re-union with the Latin Church among the Greeks in the aftermath of the 1204 Sack of Constantinople and the resulting Frankokratia - an issue that would plague the Palaiologian emperors throughout their time. Another attempt of union was made by the Palaiologian emperors in the Council of Florence in an attempt to gain Catholic support against the Ottomans, but it was also thwarted due to opposition of the masses and the monastics, led by Mark of Ephesus. It also revealed for the first time since the Byzantine iconoclasm the power of the Greek monastic establishment to act in complete defiance of the state-sponsored ecclesiastical structures in order to protect Orthodoxy, something that would visibly manifest during the Hesychast controversy, ignited by Gregory Palamas, who also happened to study under Theoleptos.

== Sources ==
- Angold, Michael (2017) [2008]. "After the Fourth Crusade: the Greek rump states and the recovery of Byzantium". In Shepard, Jonathan (ed.). The Cambridge History of the Byzantine Empire, c. 500–1492. Cambridge University Press. pp. 731–758. ISBN 978-0-521-83231-1.
- Geanakoplos, Deno John (1959). Emperor Michael Palaeologus and the West, 1258–1282: A Study in Byzantine-Latin Relations. Cambridge, Massachusetts: Harvard University Press.
- Hackel, Sergei (2001). The Byzantine Saint. St Vladimir's Seminary Press. ISBN 0-88141-202-3.
- Nicol, Donald M. (1993) [1972]. The Last Centuries of Byzantium, 1261–1453. Cambridge University Press. ISBN 978-0-521-43991-6.
- Papadakis, Aristeides; Meyendorff, John (1994). The Christian East and the Rise of the Papacy. The Church in History. Vol. IV. St Vladimir's Seminary Press. ISBN 978-0-88141-057-0.
- Talbot, Alice-Mary (1991). "Joseph I". In Kazhdan, Alexander (ed.). The Oxford Dictionary of Byzantium. Oxford and New York: Oxford University Press. p. 1073. ISBN 0-19-504652-8.
- Trapp, Erich; Walther, Rainer; Beyer, Hans-Veit; Sturm-Schnabl, Katja (1980). "9072 Ἰωσὴφ I". Prosopographisches Lexikon der Palaiologenzeit (in German). Vol. 4. Vienna: Verlag der Österreichischen Akademie der Wissenschaften. ISBN 3-7001-3003-1.
- Treadgold, Warren (1997). A History of the Byzantine State and Society. Stanford University Press. ISBN 978-0-8047-2630-6.
- This article incorporates text from a publication now in the public domain: Chisholm, Hugh, ed. (1911). "Arsenius Autorianus". Encyclopædia Britannica. Vol. 2 (11th ed.). Cambridge University Press. p. 654.
