= List of bishops and Ecumenical Patriarchs of Constantinople =

The following is a chronological list of bishops and Ecumenical Patriarchs of Constantinople. The historical data on the first 25 bishops is limited with modern scholars debating their authenticity. The Foundation of the See by Andrew the Apostle is met with similar amounts of skepticism with scholars believing it to be a later tradition. (Note: Andrew's legend is not attested before the mid-9th century and was not fully accepted until the mid-11th. The first list of bishops was allegedly written by Dorotheus of Tyre c. 300 AD, but modern scholars have shown that this was a 9th-century forgery. In fact, "there is no evidence of any significant Christian community at Byzantium before Metrophanes of Byzantium... Had there been a pre-Constantinian Christian community in Byzantium, it would have been small and under the jurisdiction of a bishop of a neighboring region". Almost all early sources refer to Metrophanes as the first bishop. His successor Alexander is often called the first archbishop, but this title doesn't appear to have been used before the 5th century. The 10th-century Pseudo-Simeon, probably using an independent source, states that there were indeed bishops before Metrophanes, but only records Philadelphus of Byzantium (under Caracalla), Eugenius I of Byzantium (under Gordian III) and Rufinus of Byzantium (under Numerian). Either way, even if Metrophanes had predecessors (which seems unlikely), their names were not recorded.) The list is mostly based on the compilation made by Demetrius Kiminas, but there is no single "official" numbering of bishops. The official website of the Ecumenical Patriarchate of Constantinople has a list of holders but gives them no numeral. (Note: Besides the first 25 bishops, some patriarchs like Callinicus III of Constantinople and Athanasius II of Constantinople are sometimes not counted as legitimate holders of the office.)

== Bishops of Byzantium (until 330 AD) ==
It is important to point out that prior to Metrophanes, it appears, there is no evidence of a 'Bishop of Constantinople'. The narrative of Andrew finding the Bishopric of Constantinople is considered, as the consensus of scholars concur, fictional. More importantly, the Chronicon Paschale refers to Metrophanes as "the first leader of the church in Byzantium for 10 years" and none of our reliable and early sources, such as Eusebius and the ecclesiastical historians of the 5th century, speak of a Bishop prior to Metrophanes. Strikingly, there also appears no evidence of a Christian community prior to Emperor Constantine's conversion in Constantinople and his import of Christians to the city.

To the careful reader we may safely conclude that any bishops between Andrew and Metrophanes are later and fictional creations with the purpose of emboldening the Apostolic status of Constantinople.

1. Andrew the Apostle (36–38), alleged founder of the see of Constantinople (see above)
2. Stachys (38–54)
3. Onesimus (54–68)
4. Polycarpus I (69–89)
5. Plutarch (89–105)
6. Sedecion (105–114)
7. Diogenes (114–129)
8. Eleutherius (129–136)
9. Felix (136–141)
10. Polycarpus II (141–144)
11. Athenodorus (144–148)
12. Euzois (148–154)
13. Laurence (154–166)
14. Alypius (166–169)
15. Pertinax (169–187)
16. Olympianus (187–198)
17. Marcus I (198–211)
18. Philadelphus (211–217)
19. Cyriacus I (217–230)
20. St. Castinus (230–237)
21. Eugenius I (237–242)
22. Titus (242–272)
23. Dometius (272–284)
24. Rufinus (284–293)
25. Probus (293–306)
26. St. Metrophanes (306–314), the first bishop of Constantinople (see above)
27. St. Alexander (314–330), the second bishop of Constantinople

== Archbishops/Patriarchs of Constantinople ==
The official title of the bishop became "archbishop of Constantinople, New Rome, and ecumenical patriarch" in the 6th century, but scholars often use the terms "archbishop" and "patriarch" for earlier bishops. The First Council of Constantinople (381) concluded that "the bishop of Constantinople, however, shall have the prerogative of honor after the bishop of Rome", while the Council of Chalcedon (451) concluded that "the bishop of New Rome shall enjoy the same privileges as the bishop of Old Rome" although both canons were not received by either Rome or Alexandria, the former canon by Pope Damasus and Timothy I and the latter was annulled by Pope Leo I. Modern scholars use the term "patriarch" after either 381 or 451. (Note: There is some confusion surrounding the titulature of the early bishops. It is often stated that the title of archbishop was adopted shortly after 330. The Dictionary of Christian Biography and Literature to the End of the Sixth Century refers to Nectarius of Constantinople as the first archbishop, while Venance Grumel refers to him as the first patriarch. The Catholic Encyclopedia states that he "may be counted its first patriarch". Socrates of Constantinople Historia Ecclesiastica (c. 440) indicate that the bishop was already called "patriarch" by his time.) The chronology mostly follows Demetrius Kiminas (2009), who mostly uses the dates established by Venance Grumel (1958). See also the lists in the Oxford Dictionary of Byzantium (1991) and the Encyclopedia of the Byzantine Empire (2015).

=== 330–450 ===
#	Name	Tenure	Notes
27	St. Alexander	11 May 330 – August 337 (7 years and 3 months)	First bishop of Constantinople
28	St. Paul I the Confessor	337 – 339 (2 years)	Deposed and exiled (see Arian controversy)
29	Eusebius of Nicomeda	339 – 341 (2 years)	Arian; baptised Constantine I in 337
(28)	Paul I	341 – 342 (1 year)	1st restoration; deposed by the Arians
30	Macedonius I	342 – 346 (4 years)	Arian and pneumatomachian. Deposed
(28)	Paul I	346 – 351 (5 years)	2nd restoration; exiled and later killed
(30)	Macedonius I	c. September 351 – 27 January 360 (8 years, 4 months)	Restored and deposed
31	Eudoxius of Antioch	27 January 360 – early 370 (10 years)	Arian
32	Demophilus	Early 370 – 27 November 380 (10 years)	Arian; deposed
33	Evagrius	Early 370 (a few months)	In opposition to Demophilus; exiled
34	St. Gregory of Nazianzus	c. May 379 – June 381 (2 years)	Bishop of the Orthodox; confirmed in 381.
35	Maximus I	c. January – May 380 (4 months approx.)	In opposition to Gregory; annulled in 381
36	Nectarius	June 381 – 27 September 397 (16 years and 3 months)	
37	St. John Chrysostom	26 September 398 – 20 June 404 (5 years, 9 months and 6 days)	Exiled; died 14 September 407.
38	St. Arsacius	27 June 404 – 11 November 405 (1 year, 4 months and 15 days)	Intruder bishop
39	St. Atticus	March 406 – 10 October 425 (19 years and 7 months)	
40	St. Sisinnius I	28 February 426 – 24 December 427 (1 year, 10 months and 25 days)	
41	Nestorius	10 April 428 – 11 July 431 (3 years, 3 months and 1 day)	Founder of Nestorianism; exiled
42	St. Maximianus	25 October 431 – 12 April 434 (2 years, 5 months and 18 days)	
43	St. Proclus	13 April 434 – 12 July 446 (12 years and 3 months)	
44	St. Flavian	July 446 – 11 August 449 (3 years and 1 month)	

=== 450–800 ===
During the 16th session of the Council of Chalcedon (October–November 451), also known as the Fourth Ecumenical Council, a resolution was passed elevating the See of Constantinople to a status equal to Rome in ecclesiastical matters, granting it second place after Rome. The resolution was formally rejected by the Pope Leo I and the Western church; however, it was largely accepted in the East, becoming known as Canon 28. This canon would later become the foundation of the Pentarchy of patriarchates.

#	Name	Tenure	Notes
45	St. Anatolius	November 449 – 3 July 458 (8 years and 8 months)	
46	St. Gennadius	August 458 – 20 November 471 (13 years and 3 months)	
47	Acacius	February 472 – 26 November 489 (17 years and 9 months)	After subscribing to the Henoticon and falling into heresy, anathemized by Pope Felix III
48	Fravitta	December 488 – March 489 (3 months)	After subscribing to the Henoticon and falling into heresy, anathemized by Pope Felix III
49	Euphemius	c. April 490 – c. June 496 (6 years and ~2 months)	Deposed and exiled; died c. 515
50	St. Macedonius II	July 496 – 11 August 511 (15 years and 1 month)	Deposed and exiled; died c. 516
51	Timothy I	October 511 – 5 April 518 (6 years and 6 months)	
52	St. John of Cappadocia	17 April 518 – February 520 (1 year and 10 months)	
53	Epiphanius	25 February 520 – 5 June 535 (15 years, 3 months and 10 days)	
54	Anthimus I	June 535 – March 536 (9 months)	Deposed, died in 548
55	St. Menas	13 March 536 – 25 August 552 (16 years, 5 months and 11 days)	
56	St. Eutychius	August 552 – 22/31 January 565 (2 years and 5 months)	Deposed
57	St. John Scholasticus	31 January 565 – 31 August 577 (12 years and 7 months)	
(56)	Eutychius	3 October 577 – 5 April 582 (4 years, 6 months and 2 days)	Restored
58	St. John IV; Nesteutes	12 April 582 – 2 September 595 (13 years, 4 months and 10 days)	First to use the title "Ecumenical"
59	St. Cyriacus II	c. February 596 – 29 October 606 (10 years and 8 months)	
60	St. Thomas I	23 January 607 – 21 March 610 (3 years, 3 months less 2 days)	
61	Sergius I	18 April 610 – 9 December 638 (28 years, 7 months and 21 days)	Monothelite; posthumously condemned.
62	Pyrrhus	20 December 638 – 29 September 641 (2 years, 9 months and 9 days)	Monothelite; deposed
63	Paul II	1 October 641 – 27 December 653 (12 years, 2 months and 26 days)	
(62)	Pyrrhus	9 January – 1 June 654 (4 months and 23 days)	Second term
64	Peter	9 June 654 – 12 October 666 (12 years, 4 months and 3 days)	
65	St. Thomas II	17 April 667 – 15 November 669 (2 years, 7 months less 2 days)	
66	St. John V	November 669 – August 675 (5 years and 9 months)	
67	St. Constantine I	2 September 675 – 9 August 677 (1 year, 11 months and 7 days)	
68	St. Theodore I	c. August 677 – November 679 (2 years and 3 months)	Deposed; died in 687
69	St. George I	c. November 679 – January 686 (6 years and 2 months)	Perhaps deposed
(68)	Theodore I	c. January 686 – 28 December 687 (1 year and 11 months)	
70	St. Paul III	January 688 – 20 August 693 (5 years and 7 months)	
71	St. Callinicus I	August 693 – August 705 (12 years)	Exiled to Rome; died in November 711
72	St. Kyros	September 705 – December 711 (6 years and 3 months)	Deposed
73	John VI	December 712 – July 715 (15 years and 7 months)	Monothelite
74	St. Germanus I	11 August 715 – 17 January 730 (2 years, 5 months and 6 days)	Resigned; died in 742
75	Anastasius	22 January 730 – January 754 (14 years)	Iconoclast (see Byzantine Iconoclasm)
76	Constantine II	8 August 754 – 30 August 766 (12 years and 22 days)	Iconoclast; deposed, died on 7 October 767
77	Nicetas I	16 November 766 – 6 February 780 (13 years, 3 months and 20 days)	Iconoclast
78	St. Paul IV the New	20 February 780 – 31 August 784 (4 years, 6 months and 11 days)	
79	St. Tarasios	25 December 784 – 18 February 806 (21 years, 2 months and 24 days)	

=== 800–1060 ===
#	Portrait	Name	Tenure	Notes
80		St. Nicephorus I	12 April 806 – 13 March 815 (8 years, 11 months and 1 day)	Exiled; died in 828, also an historian
81		Theodotus I Melissenos Kassiteras	1 April 815 – c. January 821 (5 years and 9 months)	Iconoclast
82		Antony I Kassymatas	c. January 821 – January 837 (16 years)	Iconoclast
83		John VII; Morocharzanios; Grammaticus	21 January 836 – 4 March 843 (7 years, 1 month, 14 days)	Iconoclast; deposed
84		St. Methodius I	11 March 843 – 14 June 847 (4 years, 3 months and 3 days)	
85		St. Ignatius	4 July 847 – 23 October 858 (11 years, 3 months and 20 days)	Son of Emperor Michael I Rangabe; deposed
86		St. Photius I the Great	25 December 858 – 23 September 867 (8 years, 9 months less 2 days)	Maternal nephew of Patriarch John VII and great-grandnephew of Patriarch Tarasios; deposed
(85)		Ignatius	23 November 867 – 23 October 877 (9 years and 11 months)	Restored
(86)		Photius I	26 October 877 – 29/30 September 886 (8 years, 11 months and 4 days)	Deposed; died c. 893
87		St. Stephen I the Macedonian	18 December 886 – 18 May 893 (7 years and 5 months)	Son of Emperor Basil I; deposed
88		St. Antony II; Kauleas	August 893 – 12 February 901 (7 years and 6 months)	
89		St. Nicholas I Mystikos	1 March 901 – 1 February 907 (5 years and 11 months)	Deposed
90		St. Euthymius I Syncellus	February 907 – 15 May 912 (5 years and 3 months)	
(89)		Nicholas I	15 May 912 – 15 May 925 (13 years)	Restored; died at the age of 73
91		St. Stephen II	29 June 925 – 18 July 927 (2 years and 19 days)	
92		St. Tryphon	14 December 927 – August 931 (3 years and 8 months)	Deposed
93		Theophylact; Lekapenos	2 February 933 – 27 February 956 (23 years and 25 days)	Son of Emperor Romanos I
94		St. Polyeuctus	3 April 956 – 5 February 970 (13 years, 10 months and 2 days)	
95		Basil I Skamandrenos	13 February 970 – c. October 973 (3 years and 8 months)	Exiled
96		Antony III; Stoudites	December 973 – June 978 (4 years and 6 months)	Resigned; died in 983
97		St. Nicholas II; Chrysoberges	April 980 – 16 December 991 (11 years and 8 months)	
98		Sisinnius II	12 April 996 – 24 August 998 (2 years, 4 months and 12 days)	
99		St. Sergius II	June/July 1001 – July 1019 (18 years)	Relative of Patriarch Photius I; elected after a 3-year interregnum
100		St. Eustathius	July 1019 – November 1025 (6 years and 4 months)	
101		Alexius; Stoudites	15 December 1025 – 20 February 1043 (17 years, 2 months and 5 days)	
102		Michael I Cerularius	25 March 1043 – 2 November 1058 (15 years, 7 months and 8 days)	Exiled; died on 21 January 1069

In 1054, the Eastern Orthodox Church cut ties to the Roman Catholic Church as a result of the Great East–West Schism.

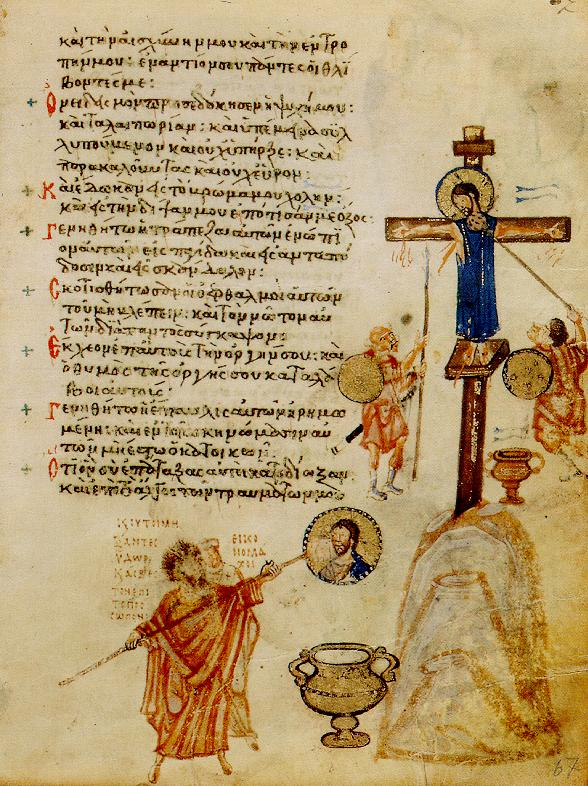
This page of the iconodule Chludov Psalter illustrates the line "They gave me gall to eat, and when I was thirsty they gave me vinegar to drink" with a picture of a soldier offering Christ vinegar on a sponge attached to a pole. Patriarch John VII of Constantinople is depicted rubbing out a painting of Christ with a similar sponge attached to a pole. John VII is caricatured, here as on other pages, with untidy straight hair sticking out in all directions, which was considered ridiculous by the Byzantines.

=== 1060–1204 ===
#	Name	Tenure	Notes
103	St. Constantine III	2 February 1059 – 9/10 August 1063 (4 years, 6 months and 8 days)	
104	St. John VIII; Xiphilinos	1 January 1064 – 2 August 1075 (11 years, 7 months and 1 day)	Deposed
105	St. Cosmas I	2 August 1075 – 8 May 1081 (5 years and 9 months)	Resigned, died c. 1082
106	Eustratius II; Garidas	8 May 1081 – July 1084 (3 years and 2 months)	Resigned
107	Nicholas III; Kyrdiniates; Grammatikos	August 1084 – April 1111 (26 years and 8 months)	
108	John IX	24 May 1111 – late April 1134 (22 years and 11 months)	
109	St. Leo	May 1134 – 12 January 1143 (8 years and 8 months)	
110	St. Michael II	July 1143 – March 1146 (2 years and 8 months)	Resigned
111	Cosmas II	April 1146 – 26 February 1147 (10 months)	Deposed
112	Nicholas IV	December 1147 – March/April 1151 (3 years and 3/4 months)	Resigned, died in 1152
113	Theodotus II (Note: Also known as Theodosius I.)	1151 – 1153 (2 years and 6 months)	Chronology uncertain (Note: Theodotus II was elected between March 1151 and April 1152 and died between October 1153 and October 1154. His successor Neophytus was elected between October 1153 and November 1154.)
114	Neophytus I	1154 (?) (a few weeks)	Resigned after less than a month
115	Constantine IV	November 1154 – May 1157 (2 years and 6 months)	
116	Luke; Chrysoberges	August/October 1157 – late 1169 (12 years)	
117	Michael III	January 1170 – March 1178 (8 years and 2 months)	
118	Chariton	March/August 1178 – February/July 1179 (11 months)	Died after eleven months
119	Theodosius I	February/July 1179 – August 1183 (4 years)	Exiled
120	Basil II; Kamateros	August 1183 – February 1186 (2 years and 6 months)	Deposed
121	Nicetas II; Mountanes	February 1186 – February 1189 (3 years)	Deposed
122	Dositheus	February 1189 (9 days)	Election annulled; 5th shortest patriarchate
123	Leontius	March – October 1189 (7 months)	Deposed
(122)	Dositheus	October 1189 – 10 September 1191 (1 year and 11 months)	Restored
124	George II; Xiphilinos	10 September 1191 – 7 July 1198 (6 years, 10 months less 3 days)	Relative of Patriarch John VIII
125	John X Kamateros	5 August 1198 – 12 April 1204 (5 years, 8 months and 7 days)	Relative of Patriarch Basil II

=== 1208–1261 (in Nicaea) ===
On 12 April 1204, the Fourth Crusade sacked and conquered Constantinople. The Crusaders established their own line of Catholic patriarchs in the city, while the former Orthodox patriarch John X fled in exile to Thrace. John X died in Thrace in the spring of 1206.

After 1204, various Byzantine warlords struggled to establish their legitimacy and sought to reconquer Constantinople. One of the major contenders, Theodore I Laskaris of Nicaea, sought legitimacy through religion. He invited John X to Nicaea, though the deposed patriarch refused the invitation up until his death. After John's death, Laskaris sent letters to Pope Innocent III in hopes of authorizing Orthodox clerics to elect a new Orthodox patriarch and seeking recognition of himself as the supreme head of the Orthodox community, though both requests were ignored by the pope. In 1208, Laskaris nevertheless appointed his own new patriarch, Michael IV of Constantinople, who in turn formally crowned Laskaris as emperor. The status of the "Patriarchs of Constantinople" based in Nicaea remained disputed outside of the Empire of Nicaea until the reconquest of Constantinople in 1261.

#	Name	Tenure	Notes
126	Michael IV; Autoreianos	20 April 1208 – 26 August 1212 (4 years, 4 months and 6 days)	
127	Theodore II; Kopas or Koupas	28 September 1213 – 31 January 1216 (2 year, 4 months and 3 days)	
128	Maximus II	3 June – December 1216 (6 months)	
129	Manuel I Sarantenos or Karantenos; Charitopoulos	May 1217 – May/June 1222 (5 years)	
130	Germanus II; Nauplius	4 January 1223 – June 1240 (17 years and 5 months)	
131	Methodius II	mid/late 1240 (3 months)	
132	Manuel II	c. September 1243 – 3 November 1254 (Note: Sources do not agree on the exact years for the period 1240–1265.) (11 years)	
133	St. Arsenius; Autoreianos	November 1254 – February/March 1260 (5 years and 3/4 months)	Relative of Patriarch Michael IV; deposed
134	Nicephorus II	c. March 1260 – c. February 1261 (11 months approx.)	
(133)	St. Arsenius	March/June – 15 August 1261 (a few months)	

Constantinople was captured by the Empire of Nicaea on 25 July 1261. The Emperor and his court arrived to Constantinople the next month. The Latin (Catholic) Patriarchate of Constantinople continued in exile until 1964.

=== 1261–1453 ===
#	Name	Tenure	Notes
(133)	St. Arsenius	15 August 1261 – May/June 1264 (2 years and 9/10 months)	Deposed; died on 30 September 1273
135	Germanus III	28 May 1265 – 14 September 1266 (1 year, 3 months and 17 days)	Resigned
136	St. Joseph I	1 January 1266 (Note: Elected on 28 December 1265.) – 9 January 1275 (8 years and 8 days)	Deposed; died 1283
137	John XI	2 June 1275 (Note: Elected on 28 March 1275.) – 26 December 1282 (7 years, 6 months and 24 days)	Deposed; died 1297
(136)	Joseph I	31 December 1282 – 23 March 1283 (2 months and 23 days)	Restored
138	Gregory II	11 April 1283 – June 1289 (6 years and 2 months)	Resigned; died 1290
139	St. Athanasius I	14 October 1289 – 16 October 1293 (4 years and 2 days)	Resigned
140	John XII	1 January 1294 – 21 June 1303 (9 years, 6 months and 20 days)	Resigned
(139)	St. Athanasius I	23 June 1303 – c. September 1309 (6 years and 3 months)	Restored; resigned
141	Nephon I	9 May 1310 – 11 April 1314 (3 years, 11 months and 2 days)	Deposed; died 3 September 1328
142	John XIII	12 May 1315 – 11 May 1319 (4 years lacking 1 day)	Resigned
143	Gerasimus I	21 March 1320 – 20 April 1321 (1 year and 30 days)	
144	Isaias	11 November 1323 – December 1327 (4 years and 1 month); 24 May 1328 – 13 May 1332 (4 years lacking 19 days)	Deposed by Emperor Andronikos II; restored by Emperor Andronikos III
145	John XIV	February 1334 – 2 February 1347 (13 years)	Deposed; died 29 December 1347 (aged 65)
146	Isidore I	17 May 1347 – February/March 1350 (2 years and 9/10 months)	
147	St. Callistus I	10 June 1350 – 15 August 1353 (3 years, 2 months and 5 days)	Deposed
148	Philotheus I	August 1353 – December 1354 (1 year and 4 months)	Deposed
(147)	Callistus I	January 1355 – August 1363 (8 years and 7 months)	Restored; died in August 1363
(148)	Philotheus I	8 February 1364 – c. August 1376 (12 years and 6 months)	Deposed after the coup of Andronikos IV Palaiologos; died in 1379
149	Macarius	c. June 1377 – July 1379 (2 years and 1 month)	Deposed after the restoration of John V Palaiologos
150	Nilus	March/April 1380 – 1 February 1388 (7 years and 10/11 months)	
151	Antony IV	January 1389 – July 1390 (1 year and 6 months)	Deposed
(149)	Macarius	30 July – late September 1390 (2 months or less)	Deposed after the fall of John VII Palaiologos
(151)	Antony IV	c. September 1390 – May 1397 (6 years and 8 months)	Restored
152	St. Callistus II	17 May – c. August 1397 (3 months)	
153	Matthew I	October 1397 – summer 1402 (4 years and a half); June 1403 – 10 August 1410 (7 years and 2 months)	Deposed in the absence of Manuel II Palaiologos; restored on his return
154	Euthymius II	26 October 1410 – 29 March 1416 (5 years, 5 months and 3 days)	
155	Joseph II	21 May 1416 – 10 June 1439 (23 years, 1 month and 20 days)	
156	Metrophanes II	4 May 1440 – 1 August 1443 (3 years, 2 months and 27 days)	
157	Gregory III	summer 1445 – summer 1450 (5 years)	Deposed; died in 1459
158	Athanasius II	summer 1450 – 1453 (3 years)	Existence contested

On 29 May 1453 Constantinople fell to the Ottoman Turks, thus marking the end of the Byzantine Empire. The Ecumenical Patriarchate of Constantinople became subject to the Ottoman Empire.

=== 1453–1466 ===
#	Name	Tenure	Notes
159	Gennadius II; Scholarios	6 January 1454 – 6 January 1456 (2 years)	Resigned; died c. 1472
160	Isidore II; Xanthopoulos	January 1456 – 31 March 1462 (6 years and 2 months)	

There are different suggestions by scholars for the succession of the Patriarchs from 1462 to 1466, all of whom resigned. The main positions are the following:

According to Kiminas (2009):

- 161. Joasaph I, 1 April 1462 – 10 April 1463
  - Gennadius II, April 1463 – June 1463
- 162. Sophronius I, June 1463 – August 1464
  - Gennadius II, August 1464 – autumn 1465
- 163. Mark II, autumn 1465 – autumn 1466
- 164. Symeon I, autumn 1466 – late 1466

According to Laurent (1968):

- 161. Joasaph I, April 1462 – April 1463
  - Gennadius II, April 1463 – May 1463
- 162. Sophronius I, May 1463 – July 1464
  - Gennadius II, August 1464 – autumn 1465
- 163. Symeon I, autumn 1465
- 164. Mark II, early 1466 – autumn 1466

According to Gemanos of Sardeis (1933–1938):

  - Gennadius II, summer 1462 – summer 1463
- 161. Sophronius I, August 1463 – August 1464
  - Gennadius II, August 1464 – autumn 1464
- 162. Joasaph I, early 1465 – early 1466
- 163. Mark II, early 1466 – mid-1466
- 164. Symeon I, mid-1466 – late 1466

=== 1466–1822 ===
The chronology up to the year 1595 is somewhat disputed by authors.

#	Name	Tenure	Notes
165	St. Dionysius I	late 1466 – late 1471 (5 years)	Resigned; died 1492
(164)	Symeon I (2nd time)	late 1471 – early 1475 (3 years)	Restored; resigned
166	Raphael I	early 1475 – early 1476 (1 year)	Deposed and imprisoned
167	St. Maximus III	1476 – 3 April 1482 (6 years or less)	
(164)	Symeon I (3rd time)	April 1482 – autumn 1486 (4 years)	
168	St. Nephon II	late 1486 – early 1488 (1 year)	Deposed
(165)	Dionysius I (2nd time)	July 1488 – late 1490 (2 years)	Restored; resigned
169	Maximus IV	1491–1497 (6 years)	
(168)	Nephon II (2nd time)	1497–1498 (1 year)	Resigned
170	Joachim I	1498–1502 (4 years)	Deposed
(168)	Nephon II (3rd time)	1502 (briefly)	Deposed; died 11 August 1508
171	Pachomius I	1503–1504 (1 year)	Deposed
(170)	Joachim I (2nd time)	1504 (briefly)	
(171)	Pachomius I (2nd time)	1504–1513 (9 years)	
172	Theoleptus I	Mid-1513 – December 1522 (9 years)	
173	St. Jeremias I	31 Dec 1522 – April/May 1524 (1 year and 4/5 months)	Deposed
174	Joannicius I	April/May 1524 – 24 September 1525 (1 year and 4/5 months)	Deposed
(173)	Jeremias I (2nd time)	24 September 1525 – 13 January 1546 (20 years, 3 months and 20 days)	
175	Dionysius II	17 April 1546 – July 1556 (10 years and 3 months)	
176	Joasaph II	July/August 1556 – 15 January 1565 (8 years and 5/6 months)	Deposed
177	Metrophanes III	January/February 1565 – 4 May 1572 (7 years and 2/3 months)	Resigned
178	Jeremias II	5 May 1572 – 23 November 1579 (7 years, 6 months and 18 days)	Resigned
(177)	Metrophanes III (2nd time)	25 November 1579 – 9 August 1580 (8 months and 15 days)	
(178)	Jeremias II (2nd time)	August 1580 – 22 February 1584 (3 years and 6 months)	Deposed and exiled
179	Pachomius II	22 February 1584 – February 1585 (1 year lacking a few days)	Deposed
180	Theoleptus II	16 February 1585 – May 1586 (1 year and 3 months)	Deposed
(178)	Jeremias II (3rd time)	April 1587 – September 1595 (8 years and 5 months)	Deposed
181	Matthew II	February 1596 (20 days)	Deposed
182	Gabriel I	March – August 1596 (Note: Theophanes Karykes served as patriarch locum tenens until December 1596; after which Meletius Pegas served as patriarch locum tenens until February 1597.) (5 months)	
183	Theophanes I	August 1596 – 26 March 1597 (6 months)	
184	Meletius I	c. 30 March 1597 – March 1598 (1 year)	Greek Patriarch of Alexandria; resigned; died on 12 September 1601 (aged 52)
(181)	Matthew II (2nd time)	April 1598 – January 1602 (3 years and 9 months)	Restored and resigned
185	Neophytus II	c. February 1602 – January 1603 (about 11 months)	Deposed and exiled
(181)	Matthew II (3rd time)	January – early February 1603 (17 days)	Died after 17 days
186	Raphael II	February 1603 – October 1607 (4 years and 8 months)	Resigned; died a few months later
(185)	Neophytus II (2nd time)	15 October 1607 – October 1612 (5 years)	Deposed and exiled
187	Cyril I	October 1612 (21 days)	Greek Patriarch of Alexandria; resigned
188	Timothy II	November 1612 – 3 September 1620 (7 years and 10 months)	
(187)	Cyril I (2nd time)	4 November 1620 – 12 April 1623 (2 years, 5 months and 8 days)	Deposed
189	Gregory IV	12 April – 18 June 1623 (2 months and 6 days)	Deposed and exiled
190	Anthimus II	18 June – 22 September 1623 (3 months and 4 days)	Resigned
(187)	Cyril I (3rd time)	22 September 1623 – 4 October 1633 (10 years and 12 days)	Deposed
191	Cyril II; Kontares	4 – 11 October 1633 (7 days)	Deposed and exiled after a week; 3rd shortest patriarchate (with Gabriel II)
(187)	Cyril I (4th time)	11 October 1633 – 25 February 1634 (4 months and 14 days)	Deposed
192	Athanasius III; Patelaros	25 February – early April 1634 (1 month and a few days)	Deposed
(187)	Cyril I (5th time)	April 1634 – March 1635 (11 months)	Deposed
(191)	Cyril II (2nd time)	March 1635 – June 1636 (1 year and 3 months)	Deposed and exiled
193	Neophytus III	June 1636 – March 1637 (9 months)	Resigned
(187)	Cyril I (6th time)	March 1637 – 20 June 1638 (1 year and 3 months)	Deposed and killed by the Janissaries on 27 June 1638 (aged 66)
(191)	Cyril II (3rd time)	20 June 1638 – late June 1639 (1 year)	Deposed and exiled; arrested on 24 June 1640
194	Parthenius I	1 July 1639 – 8 September 1644 (5 years)	Deposed and exiled
195	Parthenius II	8 September 1644 – 16 November 1646 (2 years, 2 months and 8 days)	Deposed and exiled
196	Joannicius II	16 November 1646 – 28 October 1648 (1 year, 11 months and 12 days)	Deposed
(195)	Parthenius II (2nd time)	29 October 1648 – 16 May 1651 (2 years, 6 months and 18 days)	Killed by the Janissaries
(196)	Joannicius II (2nd time)	June 1651 – June 1652 (1 year)	Deposed
197	Cyril III	June 1652 (8 days)	Deposed and exiled; 4th shortest patriarchate
(192)	Athanasius III (2nd time)	June 1652 (15 days)	Resigned; died on 5 April 1654; 6th shortest patriarchate
198	Paisius I	July 1652 – April 1653 (9 months)	Resigned
(196)	Joannicius II (3rd time)	April 1653 – March 1654 (11 months)	Deposed
(197)	Cyril III (2nd time)	March 1654 (14 days)	Deposed and exiled again
(198)	Paisus I (2nd time)	March 1654 – March 1655 (1 year)	Deposed
(196)	Joannicius II (4th time)	March 1655 – July 1656 (1 year and 4 months)	Deposed; died in 1660
199	St. Parthenius III	26 July 1656 – 24 March 1657 (8 months)	Executed
200	Gabriel II	23 – 30 April 1657 (7 days)	Deposed; killed on 3 December 1659; 3rd shortest patriarchate (with Cyril II)
201	Parthenius IV	1 May 1657 – June 1662 (5 years and 1 month)	Resigned
202	Dionysius III	29 June 1662 – 21 October 1665 (4 years, 3 months and 22 days)	Deposed, died on 28 August 1696
(201)	Parthenius IV (2nd time)	21 October 1665 – 9 September 1667 (1 year, 10 months and 19 days)	Deposed and exiled
203	Clement	9 September 1667 – 5 January 1668 (3 months and 27 days)	Bought the position of patriarch; deposed and exiled
204	Methodius III	5 January 1668 – March 1671 (3 years and 2 months)	Resigned
(201)	Parthenius IV (3rd time)	March – 7 September 1671 (6 months)	Deposed and exiled
205	Dionysius IV	8 November 1671 – 25 July 1673 (1 year, 8 years and 17 days)	Deposed
206	Gerasimus II	25 July 1673 – December 1674 (1 year and 5 months)	Deposed; died 6 February 1689
(201)	Parthenius IV (4th time)	1 January 1675 – 29 July 1676 (1 year, 6 months and 28 days)	Deposed
(205)	Dionysius IV (2nd time)	29 July 1676 – 30 July 1679 (3 years and 1 day)	Deposed
207	Athanasius IV	30 July – 10 August 1679 (11 days)	Deposed and exiled
208	James	10 August 1679 – 30 July 1682 (2 years, 11 months and 20 days)	Resigned
(205)	Dionysius IV (3rd time)	10 July 1682 – 30 March 1684 (1 year, 8 months and 20 days)	Resigned
(201)	Parthenius IV (5th time)	10 March 1684 – 20 March 1685 (1 year and 10 days)	Resigned
(208)	James (2nd time)	20 March 1685 – March 1686 (1 year)	Deposed
(205)	Dionysius IV (4th time)	March 1686 – 17 October 1687 (1 year and 7 months)	Deposed
(208)	James (3rd time)	12 October 1687 – 3 March 1688 (4 months and 22 days)	Resigned; died March 1690
209	Callinicus II	3 March – 27 November 1688 (8 months and 24 days)	Deposed
210	Neophytus IV	27 November 1688 – 7 March 1689 (3 months and 10 days)	Deposed
(209)	Callinicus II (2nd time)	7 March 1689 – July 1693 (4 years and 4 months)	Deposed
(205)	Dionysius IV (5th time)	August 1693 – April 1694 (8 months)	Deposed; died 23 September 1696
(209)	Callinicus II (3rd time)	April 1694 – 8 August 1702 (8 years and 4 months)	
211	Gabriel III	29 August 1702 – 25 October 1707 (5 years and 2 months)	
212	Neophytus V	20 – 25 October 1707 (5 days)	2nd shortest patriarchate; not recognized by the Sultan
213	Cyprianus	25 October 1707 – May 1709 (1 year and 7 months)	Deposed and exiled
214	Athanasius V	May 1709 – 4 December 1711 (2 years and 7 months)	Resigned
215	Cyril IV	December 1711 – November 1713 (1 year and 11 months)	Resigned; died 1728
(213)	Cyprianus (2nd)	November 1713 – 28 February 1714 (3 months)	Resigned
216	Cosmas III	28 February 1714 – 23 March 1716 (2 years and 24 days)	Resigned; died 28 Nov 1736
217	Jeremias III	23 March 1716 – 19 November 1726 (10 years, 8 months and 27 days)	Deposed and exiled
218	Callinicus III	19 – 20 November 1726 (1 day)	Shortest patriarchate; died the day after his election. Sometimes not counted.
219	Paisius II	20 November 1726 – September 1732 (5 years and 10 months)	Deposed and exiled
(217)	Jeremias III (2nd time)	15 September 1732 – March 1733 (6 months)	Deposed and exiled; died October 1735
220	Seraphim I	March 1733 – September 1734 (1 year and 6 months)	Deposed and exiled
221	Neophytus VI	27 September 1734 – August 1740 (5 years and 11 months)	Deposed
(219)	Paisius II (2nd time)	August 1740 – May 1743 (2 years and 9 months)	Deposed
(221)	Neophytus VI (2nd time)	May 1743 – March 1744 (11 months)	Deposed and exiled; died February/March 1747
(219)	Paisius II (3rd time)	March 1744 – 28 September 1748 (4 years and 6 months)	Resigned
222	Cyril V	28 September 1748 – May 1751 (2 years and 8 months)	Deposed
(219)	Paisius II (4th time)	May 1751 – September 1752 (1 year and 4 months)	Deposed; died October/December 1756
(222)	Cyril V (2nd time)	7 September 1752 – 16 January 1757 (4 years, 4 months and 9 days)	Deposed and exiled; died 27 July 1775
223	Callinicus IV	16 January – 22 July 1757 (6 months and 6 days)	Deposed and exiled; died in 1791 (aged 78)
224	Seraphim II	22 July 1757 – 26 March 1761 (3 years, 8 months and 4 days)	Deposed and exiled; died on 7 December 1779
225	Joannicius III	26 March 1761 – 21 May 1763 (2 years, 4 months and 27 days)	Deposed and exiled
226	Samuel	24 May 1763 – 5 November 1768 (5 years, 5 months and 12 days)	Deposed and exiled
227	Meletius II	5 November 1768 – 11 April 1769 (5 months and 6 days)	Imprisoned, then deposed and exiled
228	Theodosius II	11 April 1769 – 16 November 1773 (4 years, 7 months and 5 days)	Deposed
(226)	Samuel (2nd time)	17 November 1773 – 24 December 1774 (1 year, 1 month and 7 days)	Deposed; died 10 May 1775
229	Sophronius II	24 December 1774 – 8 October 1780 (5 years, 9 months and 15 days)	Former Patriarch of Jerusalem
230	Gabriel IV	8 October 1780 – 29 June 1785 (4 years, 8 months and 21 days)	
231	Procopius	29 June 1785 – 30 April 1789 (3 years, 10 months and 1 day)	Deposed and exiled; died 13 March 1812 (aged about 82)
232	Neophytus VII	1 May 1789 – 1 March 1794 (4 years and 10 months)	Deposed and exiled
233	Gerasimus III	3 March 1794 – 19 April 1797 (3 years, 1 month and 16 days)	Resigned
234	St. Gregory V	19 April 1797 – 18 December 1798 (1 year, 7 months and 29 days)	Deposed and exiled
(232)	Neophytus VII (2nd time)	19 December 1798 – 17 June 1801 (2 years, 5 months and 29 days)	Deposed and exiled
235	Callinicus V	17 June 1801 – 22 September 1806 (5 years, 3 months and 5 days)	Resigned
(234)	Gregory V (2nd time)	23 September 1806 – 10 September 1808 (2 years lacking 13 days)	Resigned
(235)	Callinicus V (2nd time)	10 September 1808 – 23 April 1809 (7 months and 13 days)	Deposed
236	Jeremias IV	23 April 1809 – 4 March 1813 (4 years and 11 days)	Resigned; died 5 March 1824
237	Cyril VI	4 March 1813 – 13 December 1818 (5 years, 9 months and 9 days)	Executed on 18 April 1821, aged 46 (see Greek War of Independence)
(234)	Gregory V (3rd time)	14 December 1818 – 10 April 1821 (2 years, 2 months and 27 days)	Deposed and executed; killed at the age of 75
238	Eugenius II	10 April 1821 – 27 July 1822 (1 year, 3 months and 17 days)	

=== 1822–1923 ===
Greece, which was recognized as an independent country in 1830, adopted the modern Gregorian calendar in 1923, followed by Turkey in 1926. The difference between the Gregorian and Julian calendars is of 12 days, meaning that some sources may give a different date depending on the calendar used (see also Old Style and New Style dates). The list follows the Julian dates used at the time in Greece and the Ottoman Empire.

#	Portrait	Name	Tenure	Notes	Lifespan
239		Anthimus III; Άνθιμος Γ΄	28 July 1822 – 9 July 1824 (1 year, 11 months and 11 days)	Deposed and exiled	† 13 August 1842
240		Chrysanthus; Χρύσανθος	9 July 1824 – 26 September 1826 (6 years, 2 months and 18 days)	Deposed and exiled	1768 – 10 September 1834 (aged 66)
241		Agathangelus; Αγαθάγγελος	26 September 1826 – 5 July 1830 (3 years, 7 months and 10 days)	Deposed and exiled	† 30 November 1831
242		Constantius I Κωνστάντιος Α΄	6 July 1830 – 18 August 1834 (4 years, 1 month and 12 days)	Resigned	1770 – 5 January 1859 (aged 89)

On 23 July 1833, the Church of Greece declared itself autocephalous. It was followed by the Romanian Orthodox Church in 1864, the Bulgarian Exarchate in 1872, and the Serbian Orthodox Church in 1879, thus reducing the territorial extent of the Ecumenical Patriarchate's jurisdiction.

#	Portrait	Name	Tenure	Notes	Lifespan
243	–	Constantius II; Κωνστάντιος Β΄	18 August 1834 – 26 September 1835 (1 year, 1 month and 8 days)	Deposed	1780 – 17 June 1859 (aged 79)
244		Gregory VI; Fourtouniadis; Γρηγόριος ΣΤ΄	27 September 1835 – 20 February 1840 (4 years, 4 months and 24 days)	Deposed	1798 – 8 June 1881 (aged 83)
245		Anthimus IV; Vamvakis; Άνθιμος Δ΄	20 February 1840 – 6 May 1841 (1 year, 2 months and 16 days)	Deposed	1788 – 1878 (aged 90)
246	–	Anthimus V Chrysafidis; Άνθιμος Ε΄	6 May 1841 – 12 June 1842 (1 year, 1 month and 6 days)	–	† 12 June 1842
247		Germanus IV; Γερμανός Δ΄	14 June 1842 – 18 April 1845 (2 years, 10 months and 4 days)	Deposed	1788 – 16 September 1853 (aged 65)
248	–	Meletius III; Pangalos; Μελέτιος Γ΄	18 April – 28 November 1845 (7 months and 10 days)	–	1772 – 28 November 1845 (aged 73)
249		Anthimus VI; Ioannides; Άνθιμος ΣΤ΄	4 December 1845 – 18 October 1848 (2 years, 10 months and 14 days)	Deposed	1782 – 1878 (aged 96)
(245)		Anthimus IV (2nd time)	18 October 1848 – 30 October 1852 (4 years and 12 days)	Deposed	1788 – 1878 (aged 90)
(247)		Germanus IV (2nd time)	1 November 1852 – 16 September 1853 (10 months and 15 days)	–	1788 – 16 September 1853 (aged 65)
(249)		Anthimus VI (2nd time)	24 September 1853 – 21 September 1855 (1 year, 11 months and 28 days)	Deposed	1782 – 1878 (aged 96)
250		Cyril VII; Κύριλλος Ζ΄	21 September 1855 – 1 July 1860 (4 years, 9 months and 10 days)	Deposed	1800 – 13 March 1872 (aged 72)
251		Joachim II; Kokkodis; Ιωακείμ Β΄	4 October 1860 – 9 July 1863 (2 years, 9 months and 5 days)	Deposed	1802 – 4 August 1878 (aged 76)
252		Sophronius III; Meidantzoglous; Σωφρόνιος Γ΄	20 September 1863 – 4 December 1866 (3 years, 2 months and 14 days)	Resigned	1802 – 22 August 1899 (aged 97)
(244)		Gregory VI (2nd time)	10 February 1867 – 10 June 1871 (4 years and 4 months)	Resigned	1798 – 8 June 1881 (aged 83)
(249)		Anthimus VI (3rd time)	5 September 1871 – 30 September 1873 (2 years and 25 days)	Resigned	1782 – 18 October 1878 (aged 96)
(251)		Joachim II (2nd time)	23 November 1873 – 4 August 1878 (4 years, 8 months and 12 days)		1802 – 4 August 1878 (aged 76)
253		Joachim III; Devetzis; Ιωακείμ Γ΄	4 October 1878 – 30 March 1884 (5 years, 5 months and 26 days)	Resigned	30 January 1834 – 13 November 1912 (aged 78)
254		Joachim IV; Krousouloudis; Ιωακείμ Δ΄	1 October 1884 – 14 November 1886 (2 years, 1 month and 11 days)	Resigned	5 July 1837 – 15 February 1887 (aged 50)
255		Dionysius V Charitonidis; Διονύσιος Ε΄	4 February 1887 – 25 August 1891 (4 years, 6 months and 21 days)		22 March 1820 – 25 August 1891 (aged 71)
256		Neophytus VIII; Papakonstantinou; Νεόφυτος Η΄	8 November 1891 – 6 November 1894 (2 years, 11 months and 29 days)	Resigned	1832 – 18 July 1909 (aged 77)
257		Anthimus VII; Tsatsos; Άνθιμος Ζ΄	1 February 1895 – 29 January 1897 (1 year, 11 months and 28 days)	Resigned	1827 – 5 December 1913 (aged 86)
258		Constantine V Valiadis Κωνσταντίνος Ε΄	14 April 1897 – 9 April 1901 (3 years, 11 months and 26 days)	Deposed	11 January 1833 – 27 February 1914 (aged 81)
(253)		Joachim III (2nd time)	25 May 1901 – 13 November 1912 (11 years, 5 months and 19 days)		30 January 1834 – 30 November 1912 (aged 78)
259		Germanus V Kavvakopoulos; Γερμανός Ε΄	10 February 1913 – 25 October 1918 (5 years, 8 months and 15 days)	Resigned	6 December 1835 – 28 July 1920 (aged 85)
260		Meletius IV; Metaxakis; Μελέτιος Δ΄	8 December 1918 – 20 September 1923 (4 years, 9 months and 12 days)	Resigned, also Archbishop of Athens and Greek Patriarch of Alexandria	21 September 1871 – 28 July 1935 (aged 64)

On 24 July 1923, the Ottoman Empire was dissolved and replaced by the Republic of Turkey.

=== 1923–present ===
#	Picture	Name	Tenure	Notes	Lifespan
261		Gregory VII; Zervoudakis; Γρηγόριος Ζ΄	6 December 1923 – 17 November 1924 (11 months and 11 days)		21 September 1850 – 17 November 1924 (aged 74)
262		Constantine VI; Arampoglous; Κωνσταντίνος ΣΤ΄	17 December 1924 – 22 May 1925 (5 months and 5 days)	Resigned after being deported to Greece	1859 – 28 November 1930 (aged 71)
263		Basil III; Georgiadis; Βασίλειος Γ'	13 July 1925 – 29 September 1929 (4 years, 2 months and 16 days)		1846 – 29 September 1929 (aged 83)
264	–	Photius II; Maniatis; Φώτιος Β'	7 October 1929 – 29 December 1935 (6 years, 2 months and 22 days)		1874 – 29 December 1935 (aged 61)
265		Benjamin I (Note: Also recorded as Benjamin Psomas); Βενιαμίν	18 January 1936 – 17 February 1946 (10 years and 30 days)		18 January 1871 – 17 February 1946 (aged 75)
266		Maximus V Vaportzis; Μάξιμος Ε'	20 February 1946 – 19 October 1948 (2 years, 7 months and 28 days)	Resigned	1897 – 1 January 1972 (aged 74)
267		Athenagoras I Spyrou; Αθηναγόρας	1 November 1948 – 7 July 1972 (23 years, 8 months and 6 days)		6 April 1886 – 7 July 1972 (aged 86)
268		Demetrios I Papadopoulos; Δημήτριος	16 July 1972 – 2 October 1991 (19 years, 2 months and 16 days)		8 September 1914 – 2 October 1991 (aged 77)
269		Bartholomew I Arhondonis; Βαρθολομαίος	Since 22 October 1991 (35 years and 8 days)	Current patriarch	Born on 29 February 1940 (age 86)

== Lengths of tenure ==
Longest-reigning patriarchs

1. Bartholomew (1991–present): 35 years, 8 days
2. Sergius I (610–638): 28 years, 7 months and 21 days.
3. Nicholas III Grammaticus (1084–1111): 26 years and 8 months
4. Athenagoras (1948–1972): 23 years, 8 months and 6 days
5. Joseph II (1416–1439): 23 years, 1 month and 20 days
6. Theophylact Lekapenos (933–956): 23 years and 25 days
7. John IX Agapetus (1111–1134): 22 years and 11 months
8. Tarasios (784–806): 21 years, 2 months and 24 days
9. Saint Jeremias I (2nd term, 1525–1546): 20 years, 3 months and 20 days
10. Demetrius (1972–1991): 19 years, 2 months and 16 days

Shortest-reigning patriarchs (Note: The unusual frequency of patriarchs deposed and restored, especially in the 17th and 18th centuries, has been noted by contemporaries.)

1. Callinicus III (19–20 November 1726): 1 day
2. Neophytus V (20–25 October 1707): 5 days
3. Cyril II of Constantinople (4–11 October 1633) and Gabriel II (23–30 April 1657): 7 days
4. Cyril III of Constantinople (June 1652): 8 days
5. Dositheus of Constantinople (February 1189): 9 days
6. Athanasius III Patelarios (2nd term, June 1653): 15 days
7. Matthew II (3rd term, January 1603): 17 days
8. Matthew II (1st term, February 1596): 20 days
9. Cyril Lucaris (1st term, October 1612): 21 days
10. Athanasius III (1st term, February–April 1634): 1 month and a few days

== Patriarchal names ==
The most frequently used patriarchal name is John, with 14 ecumenical patriarchs taking this name. There have also been 74 patriarchal names that have only been used once. The number of all patriarchs to the present is 269.

Rank	Name	#	Ecumenical Patriarch
1	John	14	I · II · III · IV · V · VI · VII · VIII · IX · X · XI · XII · XIII · XIV
2	Neophytus	8	I · II · III · IV · V · VI · VII · VIII
3	Anthimus	7	I · II · III · IV · V · VI · VII
3	Cyril	7	I · II · III · IV · V · VI · VII
3	Gregory	7	I · II · III · IV · V · VI · VII
6	Constantine	6	I · II · III · IV · V · VI
7	Athanasius	5	I · II · III · IV · V
7	Callinicus	5	I · II · III · IV · V
7	Dionysius	5	I · II · III · IV · V
7	Germanus	5	I · II · III · IV · V
7	Maximus	5	I · II · III · IV · V
12	Antony	4	I · II · III · IV
12	Gabriel	4	I · II · III · IV
12	Jeremias	4	I · II · III · IV
12	Joachim	4	I · II · III · IV
12	Meletius	4	I · II · III · IV
12	Michael	4	I · II · III · IV
12	Nicholas	4	I · II · III · IV
12	Parthenius	4	I · II · III · IV
12	Paul	4	I · II · III · IV
21	Basil	3	I · II · III
21	Cosmas	3	I · II · III
21	Gerasimus	3	I · II · III
21	Joannicius	3	I · II · III
21	Methodius	3	I · II · III
21	Metrophanes	3	I · II · III
21	Sophronius	3	I · II · III
28	Callistus	2	I · II
28	Constantius	2	I · II
28	Cyriacus	2	I · II
28	Eugenius	2	I · II
28	Euthymius	2	I · II
28	Gennadius	2	I · II
28	George	2	I · II
28	Isidore	2	I · II
28	Joasaph	2	I · II
28	Joseph	2	I · II
28	Macedonius	2	I · II
28	Manuel	2	I · II
28	Mark	2	I · II
28	Matthew	2	I · II
28	Nephon	2	I · II
28	Nicephorus	2	I · II
28	Nicetas	2	I · II
28	Pachomius	2	I · II
28	Paisius	2	I · II
28	Photius	2	I · II
28	Polycarpus	2	I · II
28	Raphael	2	I · II
28	Seraphim	2	I · II
28	Sergius	2	I · II
28	Sisinnius	2	I · II
28	Stephen	2	I · II
28	Theodore	2	I · II
28	Theodosius	2	I · II
28	Theodotus	2	I · II
28	Theoleptus	2	I · II
28	Thomas	2	I · II
28	Timothy	2	I · II
60	Acacius	1	
60	Agathangelus	1	
60	Alexander	1	
60	Alexius	1	
60	Alypius	1	
60	Anastasius	1	
60	Anatolius	1	
60	Andrew	1	
60	Arsacius	1	
60	Arsenius	1	
60	Athenagoras	1	
60	Athenodorus	1	
60	Atticus	1	
60	Bartholomew	1	(Incumbent)
60	Benjamin	1	
60	Castinus	1	
60	Chariton	1	
60	Chrysanthus	1	
60	Clement	1	
60	Cyprianus	1	
60	Demetrios	1	
60	Demophilus	1	
60	Diogenes	1	
60	Dometius	1	
60	Dositheus	1	
60	Eleutherius	1	
60	Epiphanius	1	
60	Eudoxius	1	
60	Euphemius	1	
60	Eusebius	1	
60	Eustathius	1	
60	Eustratius	1	
60	Eutychius	1	
60	Euzois	1	
60	Evagrius	1	
60	Felix	1	
60	Flavian	1	
60	Fravitta	1	
60	Ignatius	1	
60	Isaias	1	
60	James	1	
60	Kyros	1	
60	Laurence	1	
60	Leo	1	
60	Leontius	1	
60	Luke	1	
60	Macarius	1	
60	Maximianus	1	
60	Menas	1	
60	Nectarius	1	
60	Nestorius	1	
60	Nilus	1	
60	Olympianus	1	
60	Onesimus	1	
60	Pertinax	1	
60	Peter	1	
60	Philadelphus	1	
60	Philotheus	1	
60	Plutarch	1	
60	Polyeuctus	1	
60	Probus	1	
60	Proclus	1	
60	Procopius	1	
60	Pyrrhus	1	
60	Rufinus	1	
60	Samuel	1	
60	Sedecion	1	
60	Stachys	1	
60	Symeon	1	
60	Tarasios	1	
60	Theophanes	1	
60	Theophylact	1	
60	Titus	1	
60	Tryphon	1	

== Notes and references ==
=== References ===
- Kazhdan, Alexander, ed. (1991). Oxford Dictionary of Byzantium. Oxford: Oxford University Press. ISBN 978-0-1950-4652-6. (see ODB)
- Vitalien, Laurent (1968). "Les premiers patriarches de Constantinople sous la domination turque (1454–1476)" (PDF). Revue des études byzantines (26): 229–263. doi:10.3406/rebyz.1968.1407.

== See also ==
- Apostolic succession
- Latin Patriarchate of Constantinople
- Armenian Patriarchate of Constantinople
