= Patriarch Callinicus of Constantinople =

Patriarch Callinicus of Constantinople may refer to:

- Callinicus I of Constantinople, Ecumenical Patriarch in 693–705
- Callinicus II of Constantinople, Ecumenical Patriarch in 1688, 1689–1693 and 1694–1702
- Callinicus III of Constantinople, Ecumenical Patriarch in 1726
- Callinicus IV of Constantinople, Ecumenical Patriarch in 1757
