= Patriarch Germanos =

Patriarch Germanos may refer to:

- Germanus I of Constantinople, Ecumenical Patriarch in 715–730
- Germanus II of Constantinople, Ecumenical Patriarch in 1223–1240
- Germanus III of Constantinople, Ecumenical Patriarch in 1266
- Germanus IV of Constantinople, Ecumenical Patriarch in 1842–1845 and 1852–1853
- Germanus V of Constantinople, Ecumenical Patriarch in 1913–1918
