= Cyril V of Constantinople =

Ecumenical Patriarch of Constantinople from 1748 to 1751 and from 1752 to 1757

- Ecumenical Patriarch of Constantinople
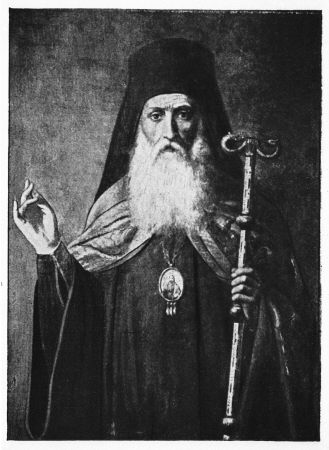
- 1907 depiction of Cyril V
- Church: Church of Constantinople
- In office: 28 September 1748 – May 1751; 7 September 1752 – 16 January 1757
- Predecessor: Paisius II of Constantinople
- Successor: Paisius II of Constantinople; Callinicus IV of Constantinople
- Previous post: Metropolitan of Nicomedia

Personal details
- Born: Dimitsana, Greece
- Died: 27 July 1775 Mount Athos, Greece
- Denomination: Eastern Orthodoxy

Cyril V of Constantinople (Greek: Κύριλλος Καράκαλλος; died 27 July 1775) was a Greek Orthodox monk who served as the Ecumenical Patriarch of Constantinople for two periods, from 1748 to 1751 and from 1752 to 1757.

A controversial figure, often blamed for his ideas about the baptism, in 1755 he issued the Oros, a canonical document which, superseding the previous use of accepting Christian converts by Chrismation, stated that all non-Orthodox baptisms (including Roman Catholics) were not valid and all converts needed to be re-baptised.

== Life ==
Cyril was born in Dimitsana, (Note: The scholar Gedeon suggested Nafplio in place of Dimitsana.) in the Peloponnese. Still young, he was taken captive during the Ottoman–Venetian War (1714–1718) and after his release he went to Patmos where he became a monk. In Patmos, he also continued his studies but he was expelled by the school for behavior issues before graduation.

In 1737, he was appointed Metropolitan of Meleniko and in 1745 he was promoted to the See of Nicomedia. On 28 September 1748, he was elected Patriarch of Constantinople for the first time in place of Paisius II of Constantinople, even if some days before he had sworn to Paisius II that he would not try to depose him.

As Patriarch, Cyril V had three priorities: the recovery of the patriarchal finances, the fight against Catholic positions and the instruction of the monks. To improve the finances, he raised taxes on the metropolitan bishops and relieved the little parishes: this action was quite successful but made him unpopular among the bishops. He strongly supported the need to re-baptise all converts, and especially women, because he considered the Armenian and Catholic baptisms as not valid. These positions created discontent among the metropolitans, who deposed him in May 1751 and reinstalled the moderate Paisius II in his place. Cyril V retired on island of Halki, near Constantinople.

Cyril V however was supported by a large portion of the populace, both because of his regulations on taxes and because of his opposition to the Catholic Church. In this regard Cyril V was helped by the thaumaturgic and demagogic monk Auxentius who preached strongly against the Catholics and instigated riots which culminated with a violent assault on the Patriarchate and the seizure of Paisius II himself. The riots were crushed, but the Ottoman authorities requested the deposition of Paisius II and, in exchange for a considerable amount of money (45,000 piastres), appointed Cyril V, who was reinstalled on 7 September 1752.

With regards to the instruction of the monks, Cyril V established in 1749 the Athonite Academy on Mount Athos, and in 1753 he called the eminent theologian and scholar Eugenios Voulgaris to guide it. However the Enlightenment ideas of Voulgaris were too modern for the monks, and he had to resign in 1758.

The opposition to Cyril V was led by the Metropolitan of Proilavo (Brăila in Romania) and future Patriarch, Callinicus IV of Constantinople. After Cyril V ordered Callinicus into exile in the Sinai, the latter took refuge in the French embassy in Constantinople. Here Callinicus obtained a large amount of money which were given to the Sultan Osman III and resulted in Cyril V's second and final deposition on 16 January 1757.

Cyril V was exiled to the Sinai, and later under Seraphim II of Constantinople, he was allowed to move to the skete of Agia Anna on Mount Athos. In 1763, he returned to Constantinople to attempt a restoration to the patriarchal throne, but he was promptly and forcibly taken back to Agia Anna, where he died on 27 July 1775.

== The Oros and the validity of baptisms ==
From the beginning of his reign, Cyril V took a stand against the validity of the Armenian and Catholic baptism, and consequently of all their other sacraments. This view was known as Ana-baptism, a term and a doctrine unrelated to the Protestant Anabaptism. The issue was rooted by the heavy anti-Catholic polemic typical of the 18th century, probably fed by the alarm caused by Catholic proselytism. Its main representatives were Eugenios Voulgaris, the lay Eustratios Argenti and the thaumaturgic and demagogic monk Auxentios, who was able to stir up anti-Catholic mobs.

The issue of the validity of baptisms arose after the Ottoman–Venetian War when the Venetian-ruled Peloponnese was reconquered by the Ottoman Empire. The Ottomans ruled the Christians through the millet system and subjected the Catholics to the civil authority of the Patriarch of Constantinople, causing numerous conversions to Orthodoxy. Cyril V's actions to require the re-baptism of converts was due both by his fierce anti-Catholic position and by his sincere desire to provide what he considered to be a valid baptism.

As of 1752, Cyril V ruled that in any case the Armenian and Catholic converts should be re-baptised. The Holy Synod met on 28 April 1755 and formally voted against Cyril V's position, considering it an innovation not envisaged by the ancient canons and contrary to the liturgical praxis. At this point, Cyril V exiled the members of the Holy Synod who were contrary to his view.

In June 1755, Cyril V issued a circular letter with title "Anathema of those who accept papal sacraments", and a month later he issued the formal order "Oros (Tome) of the Holy Great Church of Christ" which required the re-baptism in any case for any converts. The Oros had at least seven editions.

No other Eastern Orthodox Church, except the Greek churches, accepted the Oros. The Russian Orthodox Church went on following the practice it had adopted in the previous century, which recognised baptisms performed in the Catholic and Lutheran Churches as valid and did not repeat them. The Oros was never formally retired, but since the beginning of 20th century the Greek Orthodox Church authorised different forms of reception for the converts. The Oros is still today deemed as binding by some conservative Orthodox circles.

According to scholar Charles Frazee, the Oros, rather than the 1054 events, marked the true East–West Schism.

== Bibliography ==
- Frazee, Charles (2006) [1983]. Catholics and Sultans: The Church and the Ottoman Empire 1453–1923. Cambridge University Press. ISBN 9780521027007.

Eastern Orthodox Church titles
| Preceded by Paisius II (3) | Ecumenical Patriarch of Constantinople; 1748 – 1751 | Succeeded by Paisius II (4) |
| Preceded by Paisius II (4) | Ecumenical Patriarch of Constantinople; 1752 – 1757 | Succeeded by Callinicus IV |
