= Patriarch Callinicus =

Patriarch Callinicus may refer to:

- Callinicus I of Constantinople, Ecumenical Patriarch in 693–705
- Callinicus II of Constantinople, Ecumenical Patriarch in 1688, 1689–1693 and 1694–1702
- Kalinik I, Serbian Patriarch in 1691–1710
- Callinicus III of Constantinople, Ecumenical Patriarch in 1726
- Callinicus IV of Constantinople, Ecumenical Patriarch in 1757
- Kalinik II, Serbian Patriarch in 1765–1766
- Patriarch Callinicus of Alexandria, Greek Patriarch of Alexandria in 1858–1861
