= Patriarch Joseph of Constantinople =

Patriarch Joseph of Constantinople may refer to:

- Joseph I of Constantinople, Ecumenical Patriarch in 1266–1275 and 1282–1283
- Joseph II of Constantinople, Ecumenical Patriarch in 1416–1439
