= Germanus III =

Germanus III may refer to:

- Germanus III of Constantinople, Ecumenical Patriarch in 1266
- Germanos III of Old Patras (1771–1826)
