= John XIII of Constantinople =

Ecumenical Patriarch of Constantinople from 1315 to 1319

- Ecumenical Patriarch of Constantinople
- Church: Church of Constantinople
- In office: 12 May 1315 – 11 May 1319
- Predecessor: Nephon I of Constantinople
- Successor: Gerasimus I of Constantinople

Personal details
- Born: ca. 1260 Constantinople
- Died: ca. 1320 Monastery of Panagia Kyriotissa in Constantinople
- Denomination: Eastern Orthodoxy

John XIII of Constantinople (Greek: Ἰωάννης; died after 1320) was the Ecumenical Patriarch of Constantinople from 1315 to 1319. He was sometimes referred to as John Glykys. One of his students was the Byzantine astronomer and scholar Nicephorus Gregoras. John XIII resigned on 11 May 1319.

== Notes and references ==
Eastern Orthodox Church titles
Preceded by Nephon I	Ecumenical Patriarch of Constantinople; 1315 – 1319	Succeeded by Gerasimus I
