= Joachim III of Constantinople =

Ecumenical Patriarch of Constantinople from 1878 to 1884 and from 1901 to 1912

- Ecumenical Patriarch of Constantinople
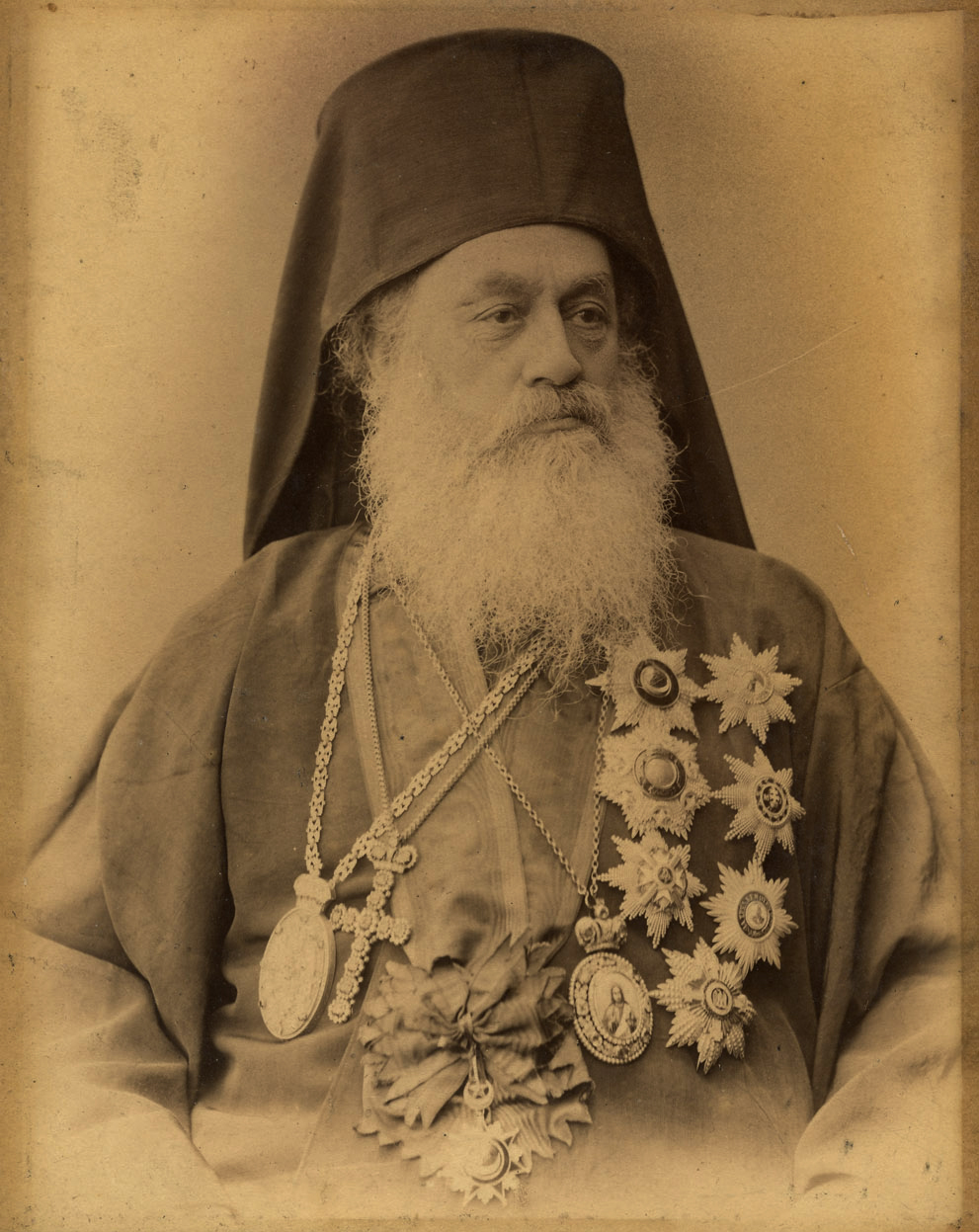
- Installed: 4 October 1878; 25 May 1901
- Term ended: 30 March 1884; 13 November 1912
- Predecessor: Joachim II of Constantinople; Constantine V of Constantinople
- Successor: Joachim IV of Constantinople; Germanus V of Constantinople

Personal details
- Born: 30 January 1834 Constantinople
- Died: 30 November 1912 (aged 78) Constantinople
- Denomination: Eastern Orthodoxy

Joachim III of Constantinople (Greek: Ιωακείμ ὁ Μεγαλοπρεπής; 30 January 1834 – 30 November 1912) was Ecumenical Patriarch of Constantinople from 1878 to 1884 and from 1901 to 1912.

Joachim was born in Constantinople on 30 January 1834, with Aromanian origin from Kruševo (from his father's side), and Eastern Thracian origin (from his mother's side). He was educated in Vienna. In 1858–1861, he was the deacon in the holy temple of St George. In 1864, he was elected bishop of Varna and in 1874 Metropolitan bishop of Thessalonica In the time of his first reign, he worked on the improvement of the financial state of the Patriarchate. In 1880, he founded the magazine Truth and did various other charitable acts. He is seen as one of the most prominent and important patriarchs of the twentieth century and modern times.

In his 1911 encyclical, Joachim III said that holding church services in the Aromanian language was against the teachings of the Eastern Orthodox Church and threatened clergy performing services in Aromanian with defrocking and excommunication.

Joachim III repeatedly attempted to find a solution to the Bulgarian schism, to little avail. Patriarch Joachim III was a Mason, a member of the «Πρόοδος» lodge. He was awarded the Serbian Order of the Cross of Takovo and the Austro-Hungarian Order of St. Stephen.

== Notes and references ==
Eastern Orthodox Church titles
Preceded by Joachim II (2)	Ecumenical Patriarch of Constantinople; 1878 – 1884	Succeeded by Joachim IV
Preceded by Constantine V	Ecumenical Patriarch of Constantinople; 1901 – 1912	Succeeded by Germanus V
