= Gregory III of Constantinople =

Ecumenical Patriarch of Constantinople from 1445 to 1450

- Ecumenical Patriarch of Constantinople
- Church: Church of Constantinople
- In office: Summer 1445 – Summer 1450
- Predecessor: Metrophanes II of Constantinople
- Successor: Athanasius II of Constantinople

Personal details
- Born: Before c. 1420 Crete, Kingdom of Candia
- Died: 1459 Rome, Papal States
- Denomination: Eastern Catholic Churches; Eastern Orthodox Church (Before 1449)

Gregory III of Constantinople, (surnamed Mammis or Μammas, Greek: Γρηγόριος Μαμμῆς; before c. 1420 – 1459), was Ecumenical Patriarch of Constantinople within the Church of Constantinople during the period 1445–1450. He was prominent in unsuccessful initiatives toward reunification with the Catholic Church.

== Name ==
Few things are known about his life and his patriarchate. Not even his surname is certain, with the names Mammis or Mammas being probably mocking appellations. In the generally unreliable Chronicum Majus of Makarios Melissenos, it is recorded that he came from Crete and that his real name was Melissenos. In other works he is referred to as Melissenos-Strategopoulos.

== Church career ==
He was tonsured as a monk in c. 1420 and is considered to have been the confessor of Emperor John VIII Palaiologos. He was a supporter of the Union with the Catholic Church. He played a very active role in the theological discussions. He participated in the preliminary negotiations with Rome at the Council of Florence and later accompanied Patriarch Joseph II of Constantinople to the Council of Florence, where he also represented Philotheos of Alexandria. He was elected Patriarch after the death of the also-unionist Patriarch Metrophanes II of Constantinople.

Gregory III did his best to reconcile monks, the church hierarchy, and common people to the agreement reached at Florence, but in vain. He was opposed by Gennadius Scholarius and John Eugenikos, who wrote extensively against the council. Leading anti-Unionist clergy refused to pray for the Emperor in their churches. In 1450, the tension in ecclesiastical circles grew so tense that Gregory III left his post and arrived in Rome in August 1451 (less than two years before the fall of Constantinople). He was cordially received by Pope Nicholas V, who aided him financially. Pro-unionists in the Latin-occupied areas of Greece continued to consider him the legitimate patriarch of Constantinople.

== Legacy ==
Gregory III died in 1459 in Rome. He wrote two dissertations about the confutation of the works of the anti-unionist Bishop Mark of Ephesus and one on the provenance of the Holy Spirit. Some of his letters have been preserved, while three further theological treatises, On the unleavened bread, On the Primacy of the Pope and On the Heavenly Beatitude, remain unpublished.

== Bibliography ==
- Ecumenical Patriarchate.
- GREGORY THE CONFESSOR.

Eastern Orthodox Church titles
Preceded by Metrophanes II	Ecumenical Patriarch of Constantinople; 1445 – 1450	Succeeded by Athanasius II
