= Constantine V of Constantinople =

Ecumenical Patriarch of Constantinople from 1897 to 1901

- Ecumenical Patriarch of Constantinople
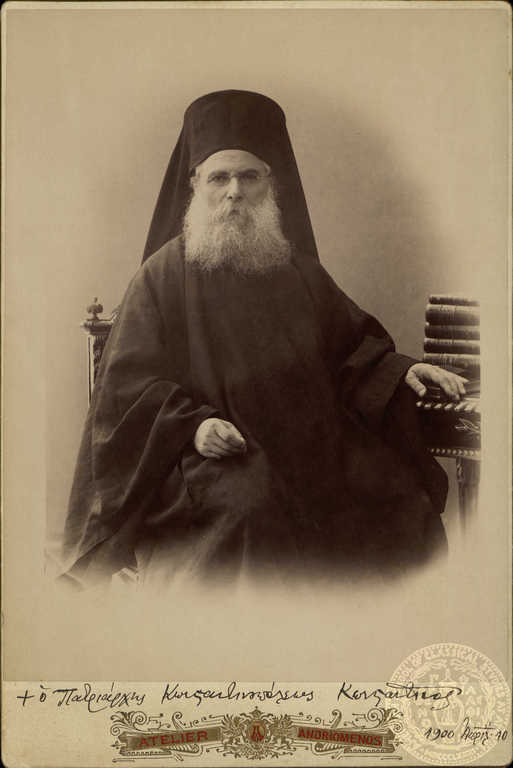
- Portrait of Constantine V of Constantinople, 1900
- Church: Church of Constantinople
- In office: 14 April 1897 – 9 April 1901
- Predecessor: Anthimus VII of Constantinople
- Successor: Joachim III of Constantinople

Personal details
- Born: Konstantinos Valiadis; 11 January 1833 Vessa, Chios, Greece
- Died: 27 February 1914 (aged 81)
- Buried: Hagia Triada Church, Constantinople
- Denomination: Eastern Orthodoxy

Constantine V of Constantinople (Greek: Κωνσταντῖνος; 11 January 1833 – 27 February 1914) was Ecumenical Patriarch of Constantinople from 1897 to 1901. His secular name was Konstantinos Valiadis (Greek: Κωνσταντίνος Βαλιάδης) and he was born on 11 January 1833, at Vessa, on the island of Chios, Greece.

He died on 27 February 1914. He is buried at Hagia Triada Church, Constantinople.

== Notes and references ==
Eastern Orthodox Church titles
Preceded by Anthimus VII	Ecumenical Patriarch of Constantinople; 1897 – 1901	Succeeded by Joachim III (2)
