= Patriarch Joanikije =

Patriarch Joanikije may refer to:

- Joanikije II, first Serbian Patriarch (1346–1354)
- Joanikije III, Serbian Patriarch (1739–1746)
