= Arsenius Autoreianos =

Ecumenical Patriarch of Constantinople from 1254 to 1264

Saint Arsenius of Constantinople
- Ecumenical Patriarch of Constantinople
- Church: Church of Constantinople
- In office: November 1254 – February/March 1260; March/June 1261 – May/June 1264
- Predecessor: Manuel II of Constantinople; Nicephorus II of Constantinople
- Successor: Nicephorus II of Constantinople; Germanus III of Constantinople

Personal details
- Born: Arsenius Autoreianus c. 1200 Constantinople
- Died: 30 September 1273
- Denomination: Eastern Orthodoxy

Arsenius of Constantinople (Latinised as Arsenius Autoreianus; Greek: Ἀρσένιος Αὐτωρειανός; c. 1200 – 30 September 1273), Ecumenical Patriarch of Constantinople, lived about the middle of the 13th century.

Born in Constantinople c. 1200 and related to previous Patriarch Michael IV of Constantinople, Arsenius received his education in Nicaea at a monastery of which he later became the abbot, though not in orders. Subsequently, he gave himself up to a life of solitary asceticism in a Bithynian monastery and is said to have remained some time in a monastery on Mount Athos.

== Life ==
From this seclusion, he was called by the Byzantine Emperor Theodore II Laskaris to the position of patriarch at Nicaea in 1255. Upon the emperor's death Arsenius may have shared guardianship of his son John IV Laskaris with George Mouzalon - while the later historians Nicephorus Gregoras and Makarios Melissenos say the Patriarch was so named, the contemporary historians Pachymeres and Acropolites name only Mouzalon. Nevertheless, a few days after Theodore's death George Mouzalon was murdered by Michael VIII Palaiologos, and who, at an assembly of the aristocracy presided over by Patriarch Arsenius, was appointed regent for the boy. Arsenius also performed the double coronation of Michael VIII Palaiologos and John IV Laskaris in August 1258.

Through the time between the death of Mouzalon and the double coronation, Arsenius had worked to protect the rights of the young emperor John IV Lascaris, at one point insisting that John IV and Michael VIII exchange mutual oaths of loyalty. He also insisted that at the double coronation John IV Lascaris should be crowned first, which Michael VIII Palaiologos saw as a serious barrier to his final usurpation. Pressure was put upon the patriarch to allow Palaiologos to be crowned alone, and even the young emperor was threatened. The patriarch found no support from the bishops assembled: except for two prelates, all believed that Palaiologos had the right to be crowned first. Arsenius at last conceded the point and crowned Michael VIII and his wife first, while John IV Lascaris received only a special head-dress.

The ceremony completed, Arsenius took refuge in the monastery of Paschasius, retaining his office of patriarch but refusing to discharge its duties. Nicephorus II of Constantinople was appointed in his stead. Michael VIII Palaiologos, having recovered Constantinople from the Latin Empire, induced Arsenius to undertake the office of patriarch, but soon incurred Arsenius' severe censure by ordering the young prince John IV to be blinded. Arsenius went so far as to excommunicate Emperor Michael VIII Palaiologos; after attempting to frighten the patriarch into rescinding the excommunication by threatening to appeal to the Pope, Michael VIII at last convened a synod, had Arsenius deposed, and towards the end of May 1265 sent him into exile. There he died some years afterwards (according to Johann Albert Fabricius in 1264; others say in 1273).

Throughout these years Arsenius declined to lift the sentence of excommunication from Michael VIII and after his death, when the new patriarch Joseph I of Constantinople gave absolution to the emperor, the dispute was carried on between the "Arsenites" and the "Josephists". The "Arsenian schism" lasted till 1315, when a reconciliation was pronounced by the patriarch Nephon I of Constantinople. Arsenius is said to have prepared based on the decisions of the councils and the works of the Fathers a summary of divine laws under the title Synopsis Canonum. Some hold that Synopsis was the work of another Arsenios, a monk of Athos; the ascription depends on whether the patriarch Arsenius did or did not reside at Mount Athos.

== Notes and references ==
Eastern Orthodox Church titles
Preceded by Manuel II	Ecumenical Patriarch of Constantinople; 1254 - 1261; In exile at Nicaea	Succeeded by Nicephorus II
Preceded by Nicephorus II	Ecumenical Patriarch of Constantinople; 1261 - 1264; In exile at Nicaea	Succeeded by Germanus III
