= Council of Constantinople (1285) =

Eastern Orthodox council rejecting church unionisation

The Council of Constantinople or Council of Blachernae was an Eastern Orthodox council, convened in 1285 in the Blachernae Palace in Constantinople. Under the presidency of the Patriarch of Constantinople, Gregory II, the Greek Orthodox Patriarch of Alexandria Athanasius III, and Emperor Andronicus II Palaeologus, the council repudiated the Union of the Churches under the Council of Lyons (1274), and condemned the pro-Unionist patriarch John XI Beccus.

== Sources ==
- Laiou, Angeliki E. (1972). Constantinople and the Latins: The Foreign Policy of Andronicus II, 1282–1328. Harvard University Press. ISBN 0-674-16535-7.
- Ostrogorsky, George (1956). History of the Byzantine State. Oxford: Basil Blackwell.
- Papadakis, Aristeides (1997) [1983]. Crisis in Byzantium: The Filioque Controversy in the Patriarchate of Gregory II of Cyprus (1283-1289) (Rev. ed.). Crestwood, NY: St. Vladimir's Seminary Press. ISBN 9780881411768.
