= Mount Galesios =

Mountain near Ephesus, Turkey

- Galesion

Highest point
- Elevation: 764 m (2,507 ft)
- Coordinates: 38.0455778°N 27.3939555°E

Geography
- Location: İzmir Province
- Country: Turkey

Mount Galesios or Galesion (Greek: όρος Γαλήσιος/Γαλήσιον), today known as Alamandağ or Gallesion in Turkish, is a mountain north of Ephesus in modern-day Turkey. The mountain is located on the northern bank of the Küçükmenderes River (ancient Kaystros), on the western coast of Asia Minor. It is notable as the seat of a large Eastern Orthodox monastic community in late Byzantine times, from the 11th century to the area's conquest by the Turks in the 14th century.

== History ==
The first monastic community on the mountain was established by the stylite monk Lazaros of Mount Galesios, who died there in 1053. Already during his lifetime, three monasteries were established near his pillar: the Saviour, reserved for 12 eunuchs; the Theotokos, for 12 monks, and the Resurrection (Anastasis) of 40 monks. Each had its own hegoumenos (abbot). A fourth monastery, the Theotokos of Bessai, was established by the imperial family and housed up to 300 monks, but it rapidly declined after the 11th century. There was also a female convent, that of Eupraxia, where the monks' female relatives could stay.

The death of Lazaros deprived the community of much of its prestige, but it re-emerged into prominence in the 13th century, with the establishment of the Empire of Nicaea, when the neighbouring city of Nymphaion became the favourite winter residence of the Nicaean emperors. The patriarchs Joseph I of Constantinople (1266–1275 and from 1282 to 1283), Gregory II of Constantinople (1283–1289) and Athanasius I of Constantinople (1289–1293 and 1303–1309) were all monks of the "monastery of Galesios"; Gregory II even wrote a new version of the hagiography of St. Lazaros. The monastery featured a considerable library and a scriptorium.

The area's history as a monastic centre ended when it was captured by the Turks in the early 14th century.

== Sources ==
- Kazhdan, Alexander, ed. (1991). The Oxford Dictionary of Byzantium. Oxford and New York: Oxford University Press. ISBN 0-19-504652-8.
