= Patriarch Athanasius =

Patriarch Athanasius may refer to:

- Athanasius I, Patriarch of Alexandria (r. 328–373 or 328–339, 346–373)
- Athanasius I Gammolo, Syriac Orthodox Patriarch of Antioch (r. 595–631)
- Athanasius I, Greek Orthodox Patriarch of Antioch (r. 1166–1180)
- Athanasius I, Ecumenical Patriarch of Constantinople (r. 1289–1293, 1303–1310)
- Athanasius II, Patriarch of Alexandria (r. 490–496)
- Athanasius II Baldoyo Syriac Orthodox Patriarch of Antioch (r. 683–686)
- Athanasius II, Ecumenical Patriarch of Constantinople (r. 1450–1453)
- Athanasius II Dabbas, Greek Orthodox Patriarch of Antioch (r. 1611–1619)
- Athanasius III, Syriac Orthodox Patriarch of Antioch (r. 724–740)
- Athanasius III, Greek Orthodox Patriarch of Alexandria (r. 1276–1316)
- Athanasius III, Ecumenical Patriarch of Constantinople (r. 1634, 1635, 1652)
- Athanasius III Dabbas, Greek Orthodox Patriarch of Antioch (r. 1647–1724)
- Athanasius IV Salhoyo, Syriac Orthodox Patriarch of Antioch (r. 986–1002)
- Athanasius IV, Greek Orthodox Patriarch of Alexandria (r. 1417–1425)
- Athanasius IV, Ecumenical Patriarch of Constantinople (r. 1679)
- Athanasius IV Jawhar, Greek Catholic Patriarch of Antioch (r. 1788–1794)
- Athanasius V Haya, Syriac Orthodox Patriarch of Antioch (r. 1058–1063)
- Athanasius V, Ecumenical Patriarch of Constantinople (r. 1709-1711)
- Athanasius V of Jerusalem, Greek Orthodox Patriarch of Jerusalem (1827–1844).
- Athanasius V Matar, Greek Catholic Patriarch of Antioch (r. 1813)
- Athanasius VI bar Khamoro, Syriac Orthodox Patriarch of Antioch (r. 1091–1129)
- Athanasius VII bar Qatra, Syriac Orthodox Patriarch of Antioch (r. 1139–1166)
- Athanasius VIII, Syriac Orthodox Patriarch of Antioch (r. 1200–1207)
