= Patriarch Anthimus of Constantinople =

Patriarch Anthimus of Constantinople may refer to:

- Anthimus I of Constantinople, Ecumenical Patriarch in 535–536
- Anthimus II of Constantinople, Ecumenical Patriarch in 1623
- Anthimus III of Constantinople, Ecumenical Patriarch in 1822–1824
- Anthimus IV of Constantinople, Ecumenical Patriarch in 1840–1841 and 1848–1852
- Anthimus V of Constantinople, Ecumenical Patriarch in 1841–1842
- Anthimus VI of Constantinople, Ecumenical Patriarch in 1845–1848, 1853–1855, and 1871–1873
- Anthimus VII of Constantinople, Ecumenical Patriarch in 1895–1896
