= Patriarch Neophytus =

Patriarch Neophytus may refer to:

- Neophytus I of Constantinople, Ecumenical Patriarch in 1153
- Neophytus II of Constantinople, Ecumenical Patriarch in 1597–1602, 1602–1603 and 1607–1612
- Neophytus III of Constantinople, Ecumenical Patriarch in 1636–1637
- Neophytos of Chios, Greek Patriarch of Antioch in 1673–1682
- Neophytus IV of Constantinople, Ecumenical Patriarch in 1688
- Neophytus V of Constantinople, Ecumenical Patriarch in 1707
- Neophytus VI of Constantinople, Ecumenical Patriarch in 1734–1740 and 1743–1744
- Neophytus VII of Constantinople, Ecumenical Patriarch in 1789–1794 and 1798–1801
- Neophytus VIII of Constantinople, Ecumenical Patriarch in 1891–1894
