= Nicephorus II of Constantinople =

Ecumenical Patriarch of Constantinople from 1260 to 1261

- Ecumenical Patriarch of Constantinople
- Church: Church of Constantinople
- In office: c. March 1260 – c. February 1261
- Predecessor: Arsenius of Constantinople
- Successor: Arsenius of Constantinople

Personal details
- Born: Nicephorus
- Died: c. February 1261
- Buried: Nymphaion
- Denomination: Eastern Orthodoxy

Nicephorus II of Constantinople (Greek: Νικηφόρος; d. c. February 1261) was a Byzantine cleric and Ecumenical Patriarch of Constantinople in exile at the Empire of Nicaea.

Originally serving as Metropolis of Ephesus, he was elected to the patriarchate after the resignation of Arsenius of Constantinople (or Arsenios Autoreianos) in March 1260. He died less than a year later, in February 1261, and was buried at Nymphaion. A period of vacancy followed his death, but after the reconquest of Constantinople in July 1261, Arsenius was recalled from his retirement and restored to the patriarchal throne.

== Bibliography ==
- Brief biography at the website of the Ecumenical Patriarchate.

Eastern Orthodox Church titles
Preceded by Arsenius of Constantinople	Ecumenical Patriarch of Constantinople; In exile at Nicaea; 1260 - 1261	Succeeded by Arsenius of Constantinople (2)
