= Neophytus VIII of Constantinople =

Ecumenical Patriarch of Constantinople from 1891 to 1894

- Ecumenical Patriarch of Constantinople
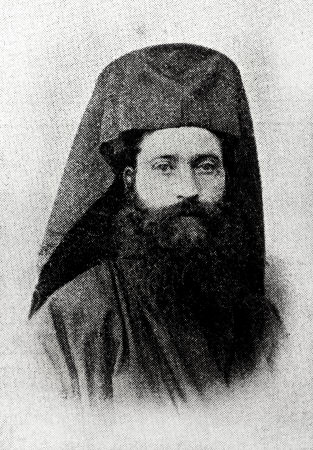
- Church: Church of Constantinople
- In office: 8 November 1891 – 6 November 1894
- Predecessor: Dionysius V of Constantinople
- Successor: Anthimus VII of Constantinople

Personal details
- Born: Joachim Papakonstantinou; 1832 Rodolivos, Serres
- Died: 18 July 1909 (aged 76–77)
- Denomination: Eastern Orthodoxy

Neophytus VIII of Constantinople (Greek: Νεόφυτος; 1832 – 18 July 1909) was Ecumenical Patriarch of Constantinople from 1891 until his resignation in 1894.

== See also ==
- List of Ecumenical Patriarchs of Constantinople

Eastern Orthodox Church titles
Preceded by Dionysius V	Ecumenical Patriarch of Constantinople; 1891 – 1894	Succeeded by Anthimus VII
