= Venance Grumel =

French theologian and Byzantinist (1890–1967)

- Born: François Grumel; 23 May 1890; La Serraz, Le Bourget-du-Lac, Savoy, France
- Died: 13 August 1967 (aged 77); Paris, France
- Occupations: Theologian and Byzantinist

Venance Grumel (born François Grumel on 23 May 1890, La Serraz, Le Bourget-du-Lac, Savoy, France – died 13 August 1967, Paris) was a French theologian and Byzantinist.

== Biography ==
He was born on 23 May 1890 under the name of François Grumel in La Serraz, in the commune of Le Bourget-du-Lac, in Savoy, France. Orphaned, he began his schooling at the Bocage orphanage, near Chambéry (1895–1902). He joined the Assumptionist, or Augustinians of the Assumption, school of Notre-Dame des Châteaux, in the Tarentaise Valley (1902–1903). Later, he transferred to Mongreno (near Turin) in Italy (1903–1905). Grumel completed his studies in Spain - at Calahorra (1905–1907) and Elorrio (1907). On 11 September 1907, he entered the Assumptionist novitiate of Louvain, Belgium, where took the name of Brother Venance. He made his first vows on 1 September 1908, then his perpetual vows in Gempe, Belgium on 12 September 1909. He took philosophy courses in Rome, where he obtained a degree (1909–1911). He made his teaching debut at Elorrio (1911–1913). He began his studies of theology in Jerusalem (1913–1914) and completed them in Italy - at Rome (1915–1916) and Fara in Sabina (1916–1917). He was ordained a priest of the Assumptionist order on 16 May 1916. He devoted himself to teaching in schools of his order: Bourville, Normandy (1917–1919); in Taintignies, Belgium (1919–1920); and Kadıköy, Turkey (1920).

Whilst teaching in Kadıköy, he became interested in Byzantine studies. And from 1922, his pursued a career with French Institute of Byzantine Studies (IFEB), which he followed to Bucharest (1937) and Paris (1957). He contributed articles to the Revue des études byzantines, and later became the journal's secretary. He was a researcher, teacher, contributor to of encyclopedias and specialized dictionaries. He established the chronology of the patriarchs of Constantinople. A recognized Byzantinist, he became a research master at the Centre national de la recherche scientifique (CNRS) in 1955. He died in Paris on 13 August 1967, and was buried at the Montparnasse cemetery.

== Research ==
Grumel devoted himself to the studies of Byzantine history, with a particular interest for the history of the Byzantine Church and its relationship with the Western Catholic Church: one main research field of him was the history of councils. He studied in depth the Photian Schism and its implications.

He edited the registers of the acts of the Ecumenical Patriarchate of Constantinople and compiled a monograph about Byzantine chronology which still is in use.

== Works ==
=== Main works ===
- Les Regestes des actes du patriarcat de Constantinople (381-1206), Institut français d'études byzantines, 1971.
- In Paul Lemerle, Traité d'études byzantines, «1, La chronologie», coll. «Bibliothèque byzantine», Paris, Presses universitaires de France, 1958.

=== Articles ===
- « Le problème de la date pascale aux IIIe et IVe siècles. L'origine du conflit : le nouveau cadre du comput juif. L'origine du conflit : le nouveau cadre du comput juif », 1960.
- « Chronologie patriarcale au Xe siècle. Basile Ie Scamandrénos, Antoine III Scandalios le Studite, Nicolas II Chrysobergès », 1964.
- « Les relations politico-religieuses entre Byzance et Rome sous le règne de Léon l'Arménien », 1960.
