= Nephon I of Constantinople =

Ecumenical Patriarch of Constantinople from 1310 to 1314

- Ecumenical Patriarch of Constantinople
- Church: Church of Constantinople
- In office: 9 May 1310 – 11 April 1314
- Predecessor: Athanasius I of Constantinople
- Successor: John XIII of Constantinople

Personal details
- Died: 3 September 1328
- Denomination: Eastern Orthodoxy

Nephon I of Constantinople (Niphon of Cyzicus; Greek: Νήφων; died on 3 September 1328) was the Ecumenical Patriarch of Constantinople from 1310 to 1314. From Veria, Greece. Nicephorus Gregoras claimed Nephon to be illiterate, a lover of luxury, and ill-suited for the position. Due to his willingness to compromise, during his time as patriarch the Arsenite Schism was healed within the Byzantine Church. Nephon I abdicated the throne after four years.

Nephon I founded the Church of the Holy Apostles in Thessaloniki and his ktetor portrait exists at the church walls.

== Notes and references ==
Eastern Orthodox Church titles
Preceded by Athanasius I (2)	Ecumenical Patriarch of Constantinople; 1310 – 1314	Succeeded by John XIII
