= Joseph I of Constantinople =

Ecumenical Patriarch of Constantinople from 1266 to 1275 and from 1282 to 1283

Saint Joseph I of Constantinople
- Ecumenical Patriarch of Constantinople
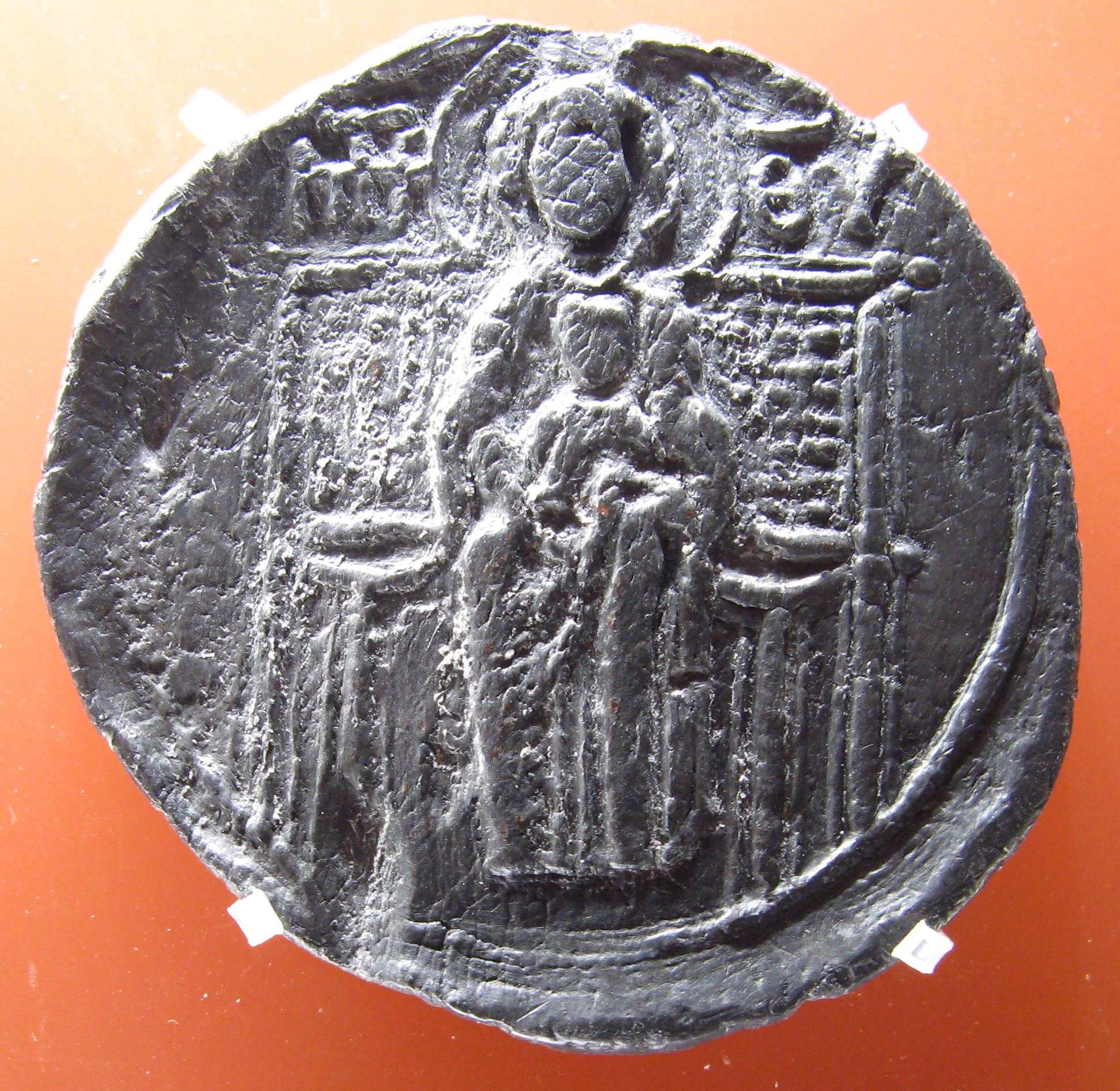
- Seal of Joseph I, patriarch of Constantinople, in lead (1268-1274)
- Church: Church of Constantinople
- In office: 28 December 1266 – 9 January 1275; 31 December 1282 – 23 March 1283
- Predecessor: Germanus III of Constantinople; John XI of Constantinople
- Successor: John XI of Constantinople; Gregory II of Constantinople

Personal details
- Born: Joseph Galesiotes
- Died: 23 March 1283
- Denomination: Eastern Orthodoxy

Joseph I of Constantinople (Greek: Ἰωσὴφ Γαλησιώτης; fl. 1222 - died 23 March 1283) was a Byzantine monk who served twice as Ecumenical Patriarch of Constantinople, from 1266 to 1275 and from 1282 until shortly before his death on 23 March 1283. He is most notable as an opponent of Emperor Michael VIII Palaiologos' plans to unite the Eastern Orthodox Church with the Catholic Church, for which he is recognized as a confessor by the Orthodox Church.

== Career ==
After being married for eight years he became a monk. He served as a lector (anagnostes) from 1222 until 1254, and in 1259 or 1260, became abbot of the Lazaros monastery on Mount Galesios. Joseph became the confessor to Emperor Michael VIII Palaiologos. In this capacity, he was sent in 1264 by Michael VIII to Patriarch Arsenius of Constantinople to seek the lifting of the Patriarch's excommunication of the Emperor on account of the blinding of the young Emperor John IV Laskaris (r. 1258–1261).

Arsenius remained intransigent, however, and at length, Michael VIII deposed him and on 28 December 1266 named Joseph to the patriarchate. Joseph I soon issued a pardon to the emperor, which enraged the supporters of his predecessor and exacerbated the so-called "Arsenite schism".

In 1272, Joseph I officiated at the coronation of Emperor Andronikos II Palaiologos as co-emperor but soon fell out with Michael VIII over the latter's projected union of the Eastern Orthodox Church with the Catholic Church. For Michael VIII, who was threatened by the ambitions of Charles I of Anjou, the Union was the sole instrument for preventing a full-scale assault by the Western powers on his empire, but the Byzantine clergy and people almost universally opposed the concessions made to the Papacy on matters of doctrine and Papal supremacy. In 1273, Joseph I swore an oath not to accept the Union under the terms set out by the Pope, and in early 1274, as the Byzantine delegation prepared to travel to Italy to effect the Union, retired from his official duties to the Church of St. George of Samatya.

Joseph I resigned his office on 9 January 1275, retiring to the Monastery of Anaplous and later to the town of Chele on the Black Sea coast, before returning to Constantinople in summer 1280 to the Monastery of Kosmidion.

== Later life and death ==
Following the death of Michael VIII in 1282, Andronikos II reversed his father's ecclesiastical policies, deposing the pro-Unionist John XI of Constantinople and recalling Joseph I to the patriarchate (31 December 1282). Joseph I's poor health however forced him to resign his office shortly before his death on 23 March 1283.

== Legacy ==
Because of his staunch anti-Unionite stance, he was declared a confessor by his successor Gregory II of Constantinople. He was later canonised, and is celebrated on 30 October.

== Bibliography ==
- Geanakoplos, Deno John (1959). Emperor Michael Palaeologus and the West, 1258–1282: A Study in Byzantine-Latin Relations. Cambridge, Massachusetts: Harvard University Press.
- Talbot, Alice-Mary (1991). "Joseph I". In Kazhdan, Alexander (ed.). The Oxford Dictionary of Byzantium. Oxford and New York: Oxford University Press. p. 1073. ISBN 0-19-504652-8.
- Trapp, Erich; Walther, Rainer; Beyer, Hans-Veit; Sturm-Schnabl, Katja (1980). "9072 Ἰωσὴφ I". Prosopographisches Lexikon der Palaiologenzeit (in German). Vol. 4. Vienna: Verlag der Österreichischen Akademie der Wissenschaften. ISBN 3-7001-3003-1.

Eastern Orthodox Church titles
Preceded by Germanus III	Ecumenical Patriarch of Constantinople; 1266 – 1275	Succeeded by John XI
Preceded by John XI	Ecumenical Patriarch of Constantinople; 1282 – 1283	Succeeded by Gregory II
