= Seraphim II of Constantinople =

Ecumenical Patriarch of Constantinople from 1757 to 1761

- Ecumenical Patriarch of Constantinople
- Church: Church of Constantinople
- Installed: 22 July 1757
- Term ended: 26 March 1761
- Predecessor: Callinicus IV of Constantinople
- Successor: Joannicius III of Constantinople
- Previous post: Metropolitan of Philippoupolis

Personal details
- Born: Delvinë, Albania
- Died: 7 December 1779 Mhar Monastery, Ukraine
- Denomination: Eastern Orthodoxy

Seraphim II of Constantinople (Albanian: Serafimi; Greek: Σεραφεὶμ; died 7 December 1779) was the Ecumenical Patriarch of Constantinople from 1757 until 1761.

== Life ==
Seraphim II was born in Delvinë, located in modern-day southern Albania in the late 17th century. He was an Albanian. Before he was elected as Patriarch of Constantinople on 22 July 1757 he was Metropolitan of Philippoupolis.

As Patriarch in 1759 Seraphim II introduces the feast of Saint Andrew on 30 November, and in 1760 he gave the first permission to Kosmas the Aetolian to begin missionary tours in the villages of Thrace.

In 1759 Seraphim II invited Eugenios Voulgaris to head the reforms in the patriarchal academy and during his tenure in the academy influenced by Seraphim's pro-Russian ideals, Voulgaris contributed to the reapproachment of the Russian Empire with the Ecumenical Patriarchate of Constantinople. As a consequence Seraphim II was deposed on 26 March 1761 and exiled on Mount Athos, and he was replaced by the Ottoman authorities with Patriarch Joannicius III of Constantinople. On Mount Athos, he rebuilt an old Monastic house and dedicated it to Saint Andrew. This house would eventually become the Skete of Saint Andrew.

On the field of politics, he supported the Russian Empire during the Russo-Turkish War (1768–1774) and the establishment of an Orthodox pro-Russian state in the Balkans. In 1769 he urged the Greek population to rebel against the Turks. After the failure of the revolution, in 1776 he moved to Ukraine, where he died on 7 December 1779. He was buried in the Mhar Monastery.

== Notes and references ==
Eastern Orthodox Church titles
Preceded by Callinicus IV	Ecumenical Patriarch of Constantinople; 1757 – 1761	Succeeded by Joannicius III
