= Athanasius II of Constantinople =

Ecumenical Patriarch of Constantinople from 1450 to 1453

- Ecumenical Patriarch of Constantinople
- Church: Church of Constantinople
- In office: Summer 1450 – 1453
- Predecessor: Gregory III of Constantinople
- Successor: Gennadius II of Constantinople

Personal details
- Denomination: Eastern Orthodoxy

Athanasius II of Constantinople (Greek: Ἀθανάσιος) is reckoned as the last Ecumenical Patriarch of Constantinople before the Fall of Constantinople. Athanasius purportedly served as patriarch from 1450 to 1453, but the only document indicating his existence is "Acts of the council in Hagia Sophia" — widely considered a forgery due to the presence of anachronisms in the text.

Modern-day scholars dispute his existence, then, suggesting that the unionist patriarch Gregory III of Constantinople, residing in Rome from 1451 on, remained the city's nominal patriarch through the Ottoman capture of the city.

== Notes and references ==
Eastern Orthodox Church titles
Preceded by Gregory III	Ecumenical Patriarch of Constantinople; 1450 – 1453	Succeeded by Gennadius II
