= Gregory II of Constantinople =

Ecumenical Patriarch of Constantinople from 1283 to 1289

- Ecumenical Patriarch of Constantinople
- Church: Church of Constantinople
- In office: 11 April 1283 – June 1289
- Predecessor: Joseph I of Constantinople
- Successor: Athanasius I of Constantinople

Personal details
- Born: c. 1241 Lapithos, Cyprus
- Died: c. 1290 (aged c. 49)
- Denomination: Eastern Orthodoxy

Gregory II of Constantinople (born George of Cyprus; Greek: Γρηγόριος ὁ Κύπριος, romanized: Grēgorios ho Kyprios or Greek: Γεώργιος ὁ Κύπριος, romanized: Geōrgios ho Kyprios; c. 1241 – c. 1290) was Ecumenical Patriarch of Constantinople between 1283 and 1289.

== Life ==
Gregory was born in Lapithos, Cyprus. His name was originally George. His parents were middle class but of noble origin. He moved to Nicosia as a teenager seeking further education. Not satisfied by the level of education provided by local teachers in Greek, he became a student at a Latin school (available then as Cyprus was a Crusader states Kingdom). He had difficulty learning Latin and thus got only a superficial knowledge of grammar and Aristotle's Logic.

Still determined to get a decent education, he got on a ship to Acre, Palestine, where he arrived after three days. From there he travelled to Anaea in Anatolia and finally made it to Mount Galesios near Ephesus. He had heard a lot about the scholar Nikephoros Blemmydes but was disappointed by him and moved to Nicaea where he studied with George Akropolites. With the recapture of Constantinople by Nicaean forces in 1261, he moved there. Later he became a teacher, his students including Nikephoros Choumnos.

He became patriarch in 1283. The Orthodox and the Catholic churches had proclaimed their union in 1274 in the Second Council of Lyon, motivated more by the emperor's politics than by theological arguments. Gregory II, contrary to his predecessor refused to accept the Filioque clause added to the Nicene Creed by the Roman Catholics. Gregory spoke of an eternal manifestation of the Spirit by the Son. Gregory II's formula has been considered an Orthodox "answer" to the Filioque, though it does not have the status of official Orthodox doctrine. Gregory II's perception of Trinity was endorsed by the Council of Constantinople in 1285, in the Tomos of Blachernai.

However, Gregory II's perceptions and attempts to more closely define the Orthodox position on the Filioque, caused a portion of the clergy to oppose his views. The situation was escalated when the former student of Gregory II, a monk named Mark, published his own commentary on the Tomos of Blachernai in hopes of mediating the controversy. The opposition to the patriarch eventually divided into two groups. The first group was led by the Metropolitan of Ephesus John Cheilas and Daniel of Kyzikos, and sought the removal of Gregory II and the condemnation of his position. The second group was led by the Metropolitan of Philadelpheia Theoleptos, who considered Mark to be responsible for the controversy, and not Gregory II. According to historian Robert Sinkewicz:

Sometime in the second half of 1288 Patriarch Gregorios retired to the monastery of the Hodegoi but he continued to fulfil his administrative responsibilities. Pressure to secure his removal was mounting rapidly. [...] The affair was finally settled in June 1289 at an assembly in the imperial palace. Theoleptos pronounced publicly on the patriarch's orthodoxy and attributed the cause of all the troubles to Mark. As he had agreed to do, for the sake of the peace of the church, Gregorios offered his script of resignation on the next day [...].

== Influence ==
Gregory II's doctrine of an eternal manifestation of the Spirit is often interpreted by Orthodox theologians as being a significant influence on Gregory Palamas and the formulation of his Essence-Energy doctrine. Particularly Dumitru Stăniloae, John Meyendorff, and Vladimir Lossky, who states:

It is interesting to note that the distinction between the hypostatic existence of the Holy Spirit, proceeding from the Father alone, and his eternal shining forth – εἰς αἷδιον ἔκφανσιν – through the Son, has been formulated during the discussions which took place in Constantinople at the end of the 13th century, after the Council of Lyon. We can grasp here the doctrinal continuity: the defence of the procession of the Holy Spirit from the Father alone requires clarification on the διὰ υἱοῦ, and that latter opens the way to the distinction between essence and energies. It is not a "dogmatic development" but one and same tradition defended on different points by the Orthodox theologians, from Saint Photius to Gregory II and Saint Gregory Palamas.

== Works ==
Gregory wrote collections of proverbs, his own autobiography, and a series of rhetorical exercises, as well as hagiographical and doctrinal works. He also left a collection of letters:

- Paroemiae (Proverbs): Schneidewin, F. G.; von Leutsch, E. L., eds. (1839). Corpus paroemiographorum Graecorum. Vol. I. pp. 349–378. von Leutsch, E. L., ed. (1851). Corpus paroemiographorum Graecorum. Vol. II. pp. 53–92, 93–130 and 131–134.
- Epistola ad Joannem II sebastocratorem Thessaliae (Epistle to John II, sebastokrator of Thessaly): Rapp, C. (1988). "Ein bisher unbekannter Brief des Patriarchen Gregor von Zypern an Johannes II, Sebastokrator von Thessalien". Byzantinische Zeitschrift. 81 (1): 12–20. doi:10.1515/bz-1988-0204. S2CID 191479342.
- Tomus fidei (Explanatory tome of the Orthodox faith), Migne, Jacques Paul (1863). Migne, Jacques Paul Migne (ed.). Patrologiae cursus completes - Series Graeca. Vol. CXLIV. pp. 233–246.
- Progymnasmata (Rhetorical exercises), Kotzabassi, S. (1993). "Die Progymnasmata des Gregor von Zypern". Ἑλληνικά. 43: 51–63.
- De vita sua (On his own life; autobiography), Lameere, W. (1937). La tradition manuscrite de la correspondance de Grégoire II, Patriarche de Constantinople (1283–1289). pp. 177–191.
- Contra Synesium, sive comae encomium (Against Synesius; or, hair praise), Pérez Martín, I. (1996). "El Elogio de la cabellera de Gregorio de Chipre". El Patriarca Gregorio de Chipre (ca. 1240–1290) y la transmisión de los textos clásicos en Bizancio. pp. 361–396.
- Vita sancti Lazari (Life of St. Lazarus), Delehaye, H. (1910). Acta Sanctorum Novembris. Vol. III. pp. 588–606.
- Oratio antirrhetica contra Joannem Beccum (Discourse against John XI of Constantinople), Kislas, Th. (2012). "Discours antirrhétique contre les opinions blasphématoires de Beccus". La vie et l'oeuvre de Grégoire II (1241–1290) patriarche de Constantinople. pp. 166–256.
- Epistulae ad Theodoram Rhaulenam (Letters to Theodora Rhaulena), Kotzabassi, S. (2011). "Scholarly friendship in the thirteenth century - Patriarch Gregorios II and Theodora Raoulaina". Παρεκβολαί. 1: 145–167.
- Encomium maris, sive de universa aquae natura (Sea praise, or on the Nature of Water), Migne, Jacques Paul (1863). Patrologiae cursus completus - Series Graeca. Vol. CXLIV. pp. 433–443.

== Bibliography ==
- Nicol, Donald M. (1993) [1972]. The Last Centuries of Byzantium, 1261–1453 (Second ed.). Cambridge: Cambridge University Press. ISBN 978-0-521-43991-6.
- Ostrogorsky, George (1956). History of the Byzantine State. Oxford: Basil Blackwell.
- Papadakis, Aristeides (1997). Crisis in Byzantium - The Filioque Controversy in the Patriarchate of Gregory II (1283–1289). Crestwood, Yonkers: Saint Vladimir's Orthodox Theological Seminary. ISBN 9780881411768.
- Sinkewicz, Robert E., ed. (1992). Theoleptos of Philadelphia: The Monastic Discourses. Toronto: Pontifical Institute of Medieval Studies. ISBN 0-88844-111-8.

Eastern Orthodox Church titles
Preceded by Joseph I (2)	Ecumenical Patriarch of Constantinople; 1283 – 1289	Succeeded by Athanasius I
