= Anthimus VII of Constantinople =

Ecumenical Patriarch of Constantinople from 1895 to 1897

- Ecumenical Patriarch of Constantinople
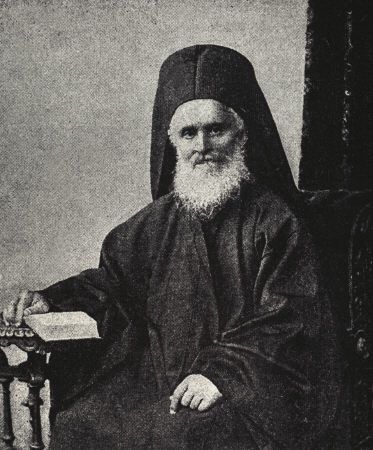
- Anthimus VII in 1896
- Church: Church of Constantinople
- In office: 1 February 1895 – 29 January 1897
- Predecessor: Neophytus VIII of Constantinople
- Successor: Constantine V of Constantinople

Personal details
- Born: Angelos Tsatsos; 1827 Filiates, Greece
- Died: 5 December 1913 (aged 85–86) Heybeliada, Ottoman Empire
- Denomination: Eastern Orthodoxy

Anthimus VII of Constantinople (Greek: Ἄνθιμος; born Angelos Tsatsos; 1827 – 5 December 1913) served as the Ecumenical Patriarch of Constantinople from 1895 until his resignation on 29 January 1897. He died in Heybeliada, Ottoman Empire.

In 1895, he criticised the encyclical Praeclara gratulationis publicae of Pope Leo XIII.

== Notes and references ==
Eastern Orthodox Church titles
Preceded by Neophytus VIII	Ecumenical Patriarch of Constantinople; 1895 – 1897	Succeeded by Constantine V
