= Patriarch Maximus =

Patriarch Maximus or Patriarch Maximos may refer to:

- Maximus I of Constantinople, Patriarch in 380
- Maximus II of Antioch, Patriarch of Antioch in 449–455
- Maximus II of Constantinople, Ecumenical Patriarch in 1216
- Maximos II Hakim, Patriarch of the Melkite Greek Catholic Church in 1760–1761
- Maximus III of Jerusalem, ruled in 335–350
- Maximus III of Constantinople, Ecumenical Patriarch in 1476–1482
- Maximos III Mazloum, Patriarch of the Melkite Greek Catholic Church in 1833–1855
- Maximus IV of Constantinople, Ecumenical Patriarch in 1491–1497
- Maximos IV Sayegh, patriarch of the Melkite Greek Catholic Church in 1948–1967
- Maximus V of Constantinople, Ecumenical Patriarch in 1946–1948
- Maximos V Hakim, Melkite Greek Catholic Patriarch in 1967–2000

== See also ==
- Patriarch (disambiguation)
- Maximus (disambiguation)
- Maxim (disambiguation)
