= Anaplous =

Ancient town in Thrace

Coordinates: 41°04′04″N 29°02′35″E

Anaplous or Promotou was a town of ancient Thrace on the Bosphorus, inhabited during Byzantine times.

Its site is tentatively located near Arnavutköy in European Turkey.
