= Callinicus III of Constantinople =

Ecumenical Patriarch of Constantinople in 1726 (1 day)

- Ecumenical Patriarch of Constantinople
- Church: Church of Constantinople
- Elected: 19 November 1726
- Term ended: 20 November 1726
- Predecessor: Jeremias III of Constantinople
- Successor: Paisius II of Constantinople
- Previous post: Metropolitan of Heraclea

Personal details
- Born: Naxos, Greece
- Died: 20 November 1726 Constantinople
- Denomination: Eastern Orthodoxy

Callinicus III of Constantinople (Greek: Καλλίνικος; died 20 November 1726) was Ecumenical Patriarch of Constantinople for one day in 1726. He is sometimes not counted amongst the patriarchs, and Callinicus IV of Constantinople, who was Patriarch for a short time in 1757, is then numbered as the third of that name.

== Life ==
Callinicus was a native of Naxos and before he was elected as Patriarch of Constantinople he was Metropolitan of Heraclea.

When Jeremias III of Constantinople was deposed on 19 November 1726, Callinicus was elected as Patriarch on the evening of the same day, but he died in the night at his home before the enthronement, possibly from a heart attack due to the happiness at his election.

The appointment fee that he had to pay to the Ottoman Sultan to allow his election was the maximum ever reached: no less than 36,400 Kuruş, about 5,600 gold pounds. The high amounts of these appointment fees, that the Greek Church could barely afford, were due both to the greed of the Ottoman rulers and to the rivalries and quarrels into the Greek community which led to rapid changes and re-installments of Patriarchs. After the scandal due to a such large amount wasted for a single day reign, the situation slowly improved with longer reigns and lower fees.

== Notes and references ==
Eastern Orthodox Church titles
Preceded by Jeremias III	Ecumenical Patriarch of Constantinople; 1726	Succeeded by Paisius II
