= Callinicus IV of Constantinople =

Ecumenical Patriarch of Constantinople in 1757

- Ecumenical Patriarch of Constantinople
- Church: Church of Constantinople
- Appointed: 16 January 1757
- Term ended: 22 July 1757
- Predecessor: Cyril V of Constantinople
- Successor: Seraphim II of Constantinople
- Previous post: Metropolitan of Brăila

Personal details
- Born: Constantine Mavrikios; 1713 Zagora, Ottoman Greece
- Died: 1791 (aged 77–78) Zagora, Ottoman Greece
- Denomination: Eastern Orthodoxy

Callinicus IV of Constantinople (Greek: Καλλίνικος), born Constantine Mavrikios (Κωνσταντῖνος Μαυρίκιος; 1713–1791) was Ecumenical Patriarch of Constantinople for a few months in 1757 and a writer and scholar.

Callinicus IV is sometime numbered as Callinicus III because his predecessor Callinicus III of Constantinople, who was elected in 1726 but died before being enthroned, is sometimes not counted amongst the patriarchs. (Note: The ordinal number "IV" is used by scholars such as Gedeon (1890), Janin (1914), Runciman (1985), and Kiminas (2009). The ordinal "III" on the other hand is used by the official website of the Patriarchate for instance.)

== Life ==
Constantine Mavrikios (Callinicus is his religious name) was born in Zagora, Greece in 1713 and in 1728 he moved to Constantinople. In 1740, he was ordained a deacon and on 28 August 1741, he was appointed Great Protosyncellus of the Patriarchate. On 23 September 1743, he was appointed the Metropolitan Bishop of Proilavo (i.e. Brăila, in Romania), a position he kept till 1748 when he returned to Constantinople.

His years in Constantinople were marked by the polemic debate in the Orthodox community about whether converts the Roman Catholic and Armenian Apostolic Churches needed to be re-baptised. These communities were particularly numerous after the Ottoman–Venetian War wherein the Ottoman Empire reconquered the Venetian-ruled Peloponnese.

The supporters of the invalidity of Catholic and Armenian baptisms, and consequently of the need to re-baptise, were Patriarch Cyril V of Constantinople supported by some scholars such as Eugenios Voulgaris and Eustratios Argenti, and a large portion of the populace, instigated by the demagogic monk Auxentios. The opposition to re-baptism was formed by the larger part of the Metropolitans led by Callinicus. Their position was not due to compliance with the Latins, but rather that they considered the re-baptisms an innovation not envisaged by the ancient canons and contrary to the liturgical praxis.

When the Holy Synod voted on 28 April 1755 against the positions of Cyril V, the latter exiled the members of the Holy Synod who were contrary to his view. Callinicus was persecuted and had to escape. In 1755, Cyril V issued his formal "Oros (Tome) of the Holy Great Church of Christ" which required re-baptism for all converts in any case.

In 1756, Callinicus took refuge in the French embassy in Constantinople, and here he obtained a large amount of money which was given to the Sultan Osman III. This resulted in Cyril's deposition on 16 January 1757 and in the appointment of Callinicus to the Patriarchate. However, his appointment was strongly opposed by a mob, and his enthronement could be celebrated only with the presence of Ottoman soldiers. After the ceremony, the mob tried unsuccessfully to seize him. This opposition to Callinicus IV hindered any attempt of him to retire the Oros, and his position was so difficult that he had to resign 22 July 1757, in favor of Seraphim II of Constantinople who remained neutral on the issue.

After his resignation, Callinicus IV was exiled to Limnos and later to the Sinai where he stayed in the Saint Catherine's Monastery. In this obligatory residence, he worked in the ancient library of the Monastery. In January 1761, he escaped and returned on the slay in Constantinople, where he obtained to be forgiven, and in October 1763 he returned to his birth town, Zagora.

The last period of his life was passed in Zagora, where he founded the local library and devoted himself to patristics studies and to writing. He died in Zagora in 1791.

== Bibliography ==
- Frazee, Charles (2006) [1983]. Catholics and Sultans - The Church and the Ottoman Empire 1453–1923. Cambridge University Press. ISBN 9780521027007.

Eastern Orthodox Church titles
Preceded by Cyril V (2)	Ecumenical Patriarch of Constantinople; 1757	Succeeded by Seraphim II
