= John XI of Constantinople =

Ecumenical Patriarch of Constantinople from 1275 to 1282

- Ecumenical Patriarch of Constantinople
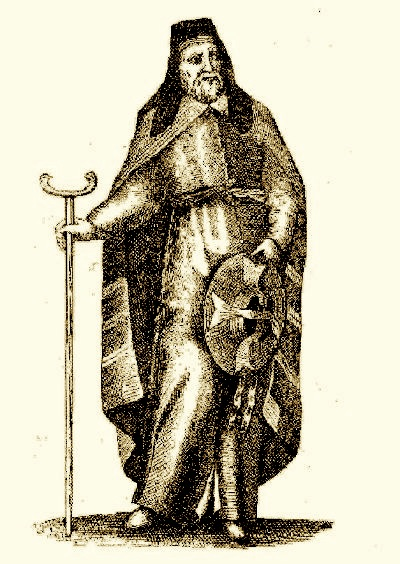
- Earliest known depiction of John XI of Constantinople, from Jacques Goar's Euchologion (Paris, 1667)
- Church: Church of Constantinople
- In office: 2 June 1275 – 26 December 1282
- Predecessor: Joseph I of Constantinople
- Successor: Joseph I of Constantinople

Personal details
- Born: John Bekkos c. 1225 Nicaea, Kingdom of Nicaea
- Died: March 1297 (aged c. 72) Byzantine Empire
- Denomination: Eastern Catholicism

John XI Bekkos (also Beccus; Greek: Ἰωάννης Βέκκος; c. 1225 – March 1297) was Patriarch of Constantinople from 2 June 1275 to 26 December 1282, and the chief Greek advocate, in Byzantine times, of the reunion of the Eastern Orthodox and Catholic churches.

== Life ==
John Beccus was born in Nicaea among the exiles from Constantinople during the period of Latin occupation of that city, and died in prison in the fortress of St. Gregory near the entrance to the Astacus Gulf, near Nicomedia. Our knowledge of Beccus's life is derived from his own writings, from writings of Byzantine historians such as George Pachymeres and Nicephorus Gregoras, from writings against him by Gregory II of Constantinople and others, and from defences of him by supporters of ecclesiastical union like Constantine Meliteniotes and George Metochites. John XI's history is closely bound up with the fortunes of the Union of the Churches declared at the Second Council of Lyon (1272–1274), a union promoted by Pope Gregory X in the West and Emperor Michael VIII Palaiologos in the East. The union policy of Michael VIII was largely politically motivated, and John XI at first opposed it; but, after Michael VIII had had him imprisoned in the Tower of Anemas for speaking out against it, John XI changed his mind (1273); a reading of such Greek church fathers as Saint Basil of Caesarea, Saint Cyril of Alexandria and Saint Epiphanius of Salamis convinced John XI that theological differences between the Greek and Latin Churches had been exaggerated. After Patriarch Joseph I of Constantinople abdicated early in 1275 due to his opposition to the Second Council of Lyon, John XI was elected to replace him. His relationship with the emperor was sometimes stormy; although Michael VIII depended on John XI for maintaining his empire's peace with the West, he was annoyed by John XI's repeated intercessions on behalf of the poor. Michael VIII was a crafty man and knew how to make the Patriarch's life miserable by sundry small humiliations, until, in March 1279, John XI quit in disgust, and had to be coaxed back to undertake the job again (6 August 1279). The final years of Michael VIII's reign were entirely taken up with defending his empire against the threat posed by the Western king Charles I of Anjou, and, in his anxiety to meet this threat, Michael VIII enforced a "reign of terror" against opponents of union; but there is no convincing evidence that John XI ever actively took part in or supported acts of violent persecution.

Although earlier in his patriarchate John XI had promised not to reply to the pamphlets that were being circulated against the ecclesiastical union, by the latter years of Michael VIII's reign he had changed his mind about this, and began "holding numerous synods, calling all and sundry, and dug up books and published many others", defending the union on theological grounds, arguing the compatibility of the Latin doctrine with Greek patristic tradition. The effect of this was further to alienate most of the Greek clergy against him; it was this publishing activity that later served as the explicit grounds for the charges that were laid against him.

The ecclesial union engineered by Michael VIII was never popular in Byzantium, and, after his death (11 December 1282), his son and successor, Andronikos II Palaiologos, repudiated it. On the day after Christmas 1282, John XI withdrew to a monastery; the former patriarch Joseph I of Constantinople, was brought into the city on a stretcher, and a series of councils and public meetings ensued, led by a group of anti-unionist monks. John XI, in fear of violent death at the hands of a mob, was induced to sign a formal renunciation of his unionist opinions and of his priesthood (January 1283), a renunciation which he afterwards disowned as extorted under duress, but which was used against him. After this, John XI spent some years under house arrest at a large monastery in Prusa in Asia Minor. From there, he began a literary campaign to exonerate himself, and succeeded in having a council called to reexamine his case; it took place at the imperial palace of Blachernae in Constantinople, meeting in several sessions from February to August in the year 1285. Although the Council of Blachernae reaffirmed John XI's earlier condemnation, in the council's aftermath John XI, by a series of writings, succeeded in bringing its dogmatic statement against him (the Tomus of 1285) into such disrepute that its principal author, the Patriarch Gregory II of Constantinople, resigned (1289). John XI saw this as vindicating his position. He spent the remaining years of his life in prison in the fortress of Saint Gregory, revising his writings, maintaining friendly relations with the Emperor and prominent Byzantine churchmen, but unwilling to give up his unionist opinions; he died in 1297.

== Thought ==
The basis of John XI's quarrel with his contemporaries was a disagreement with them over the implications of a traditional patristic formula, that states that the Holy Spirit proceeds from the Father through the Son (in Greek, διὰ τοῦ Υἱοῦ). Already in the ninth century, this expression was being pushed in two different directions: Latin writers saw it as implying the Augustinian doctrine that the Holy Spirit proceeds from the Father and the Son (Filioque); Greek writers, especially from the time of Patriarch Photius I onward, saw it as consistent with the view that the Holy Spirit proceeds from the Father alone. John XI originally agreed with the Photian view, but his reading of the Greek fathers, and of medieval Greek writers like Nikephoros Blemmydes and Nicetas of Maroneia, caused him to change his mind. Much of John XI's debate with Gregory II was a debate over the meaning of texts from Saint Cyril and other fathers, whose wording (the Spirit "exists from the Son"; the Spirit "fountains forth eternally" from the Son, etc.) John XI saw as consistent with the Latin doctrine, while Gregory of Cyprus interpreted such texts as necessarily referring to an eternal manifestation of the Holy Spirit through or from the Son. This thirteenth-century debate has considerable relevance for current-day ecumenical discussions between the Eastern Orthodox Church and the Catholic Church.

== Editions ==
Most of John XI's writings are found in vol. 141 of Jacques Paul Migne's Patrologia Graeca, although some still remain unedited. Migne reprints the seventeenth-century editions of Leo Allatius; a more reliable re-edition was produced by H. Laemmer in the nineteenth century (Scriptorum Graeciae orthodoxae bibliotheca selecta, Freiburg, 1864), but even this edition lacks references for John XI's many patristic citations. Only a few, short writings of John XI's have received modern, critical editions. One of them is his work De pace ecclesiastica ("On Ecclesiastical Peace"), found in V. Laurent and J. Darrouzès, Dossier grec de l'union de Lyon, 1273–1277 (Paris, 1976); in it, John XI criticizes the foundations of the schism between the Churches on historical grounds alone, pointing out that the Patriarch Photius only chose to launch a campaign against the Latin doctrine after his claim to be rightful Patriarch of Constantinople was rejected by Pope Nicholas I.

Some of John XI's most important works are as follows:

- On the Union and Peace of the Churches of Old and New Rome (PG 141, 15–157): this work summarizes Bekkos's main patristic arguments and rebuts the arguments of four Byzantine critics of Latin Christian theology (Photius, John Phurnes, Nicholas of Methone, Theophylact of Ohrid);
- Epigraphs (PG 141, 613–724): an anthology of patristic texts arranged under thirteen "chapter headings," presenting a connected argument for the compatibility of the Greek and Latin doctrines of the procession of the Holy Spirit; 160 years later, it was instrumental in convincing Bessarion, at the Council of Florence, that the Latin doctrine was orthodox;
- Orations I and II On his own Deposition (PG 141, 949–1010): John XI's own account of events during the tumultuous synods of early 1283;
- De libris suis ("On his own works") (PG 141, 1019–1028): a short work, but essential for the critical history of John XI's texts. In it, John XI discusses the principles which governed his revision of his own works in an edition he wrote out by hand while he was in prison;
- Refutation of the "Tome" of George of Cyprus (PG 141, 863–923) and Four Books to Constantine Meliteniotes (PG 141, 337–396): John XI's critique of his antagonist Gregory II.

== Notes and references ==
Eastern Orthodox Church titles
Preceded by Joseph I	Ecumenical Patriarch of Constantinople; 1275 – 1282	Succeeded by Joseph I (2)
