= Germanus V of Constantinople =

Ecumenical Patriarch of Constantinople from 1913 to 1918

Germanus V
- 261st Archbishop of Constantinople, New Rome and Ecumenical Patriarch
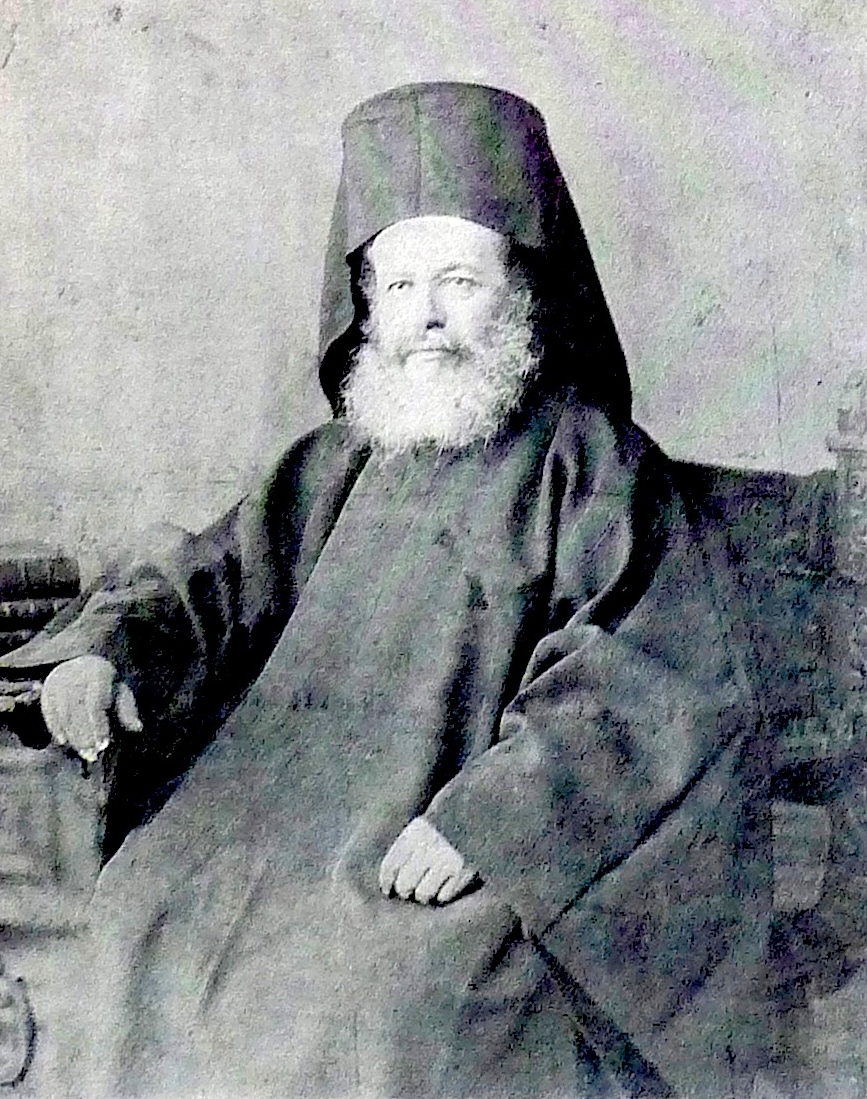
- Patriarch Germanus V in 1913
- Church: Ecumenical Patriarchate of Constantinople
- In office: 10 February 1913 – 25 October 1918
- Predecessor: Joachim III
- Successor: Meletius IV

Personal details
- Born: 6 December 1835
- Died: 28 July 1920 (aged 84) Kadıköy, Ottoman Empire
- Buried: Kadıköy, Ottoman Empire
- Denomination: Eastern Orthodoxy

Ecumenical Patriarch Germanus V (Greek: Γερμανός; 6 December 1835 – 28 July 1920) was the 261st Ecumenical Patriarch of Constantinople from 10 February 1913 until his resignation in 25 October 1918, serving as the primus inter pares (first among equals) and spiritual leader of Eastern Orthodox Christianity worldwide.

Germanus was educated in Jerusalem and Athens before attending the Theological School of Halki. He was elected metropolitan of Kos (1867), Rhodes (1876–1888), Iraklia (1888–1897) and Chalkedon (1897–1913). On 28 January 1913, he was elected Ecumenical Patriarch of Constantinople.

He was one of the pioneers, in the years 1886–1897, of the efforts for the return of the exiled Joachim III of Constantinople. On 7 October 1918, a great rebellion against the Orthodox came and was condemned within the Church of Constantinople. He was forced to resign from the throne on 25 October 1918, retiring to Kadıköy where he died and was buried in December 1920. He was the last patriarch who received the imperial veranda, the state's recognition of the Sultan.

== 1920 encyclical ==
Germanus V is the author of an encyclical published in 1920 as a milestone for the ecumenical movement. He evokes the notion of a "fraternity of churches" to be created, a "blessed union" of the churches for which he invites different traditions to contribute by engaging in the joint study of the essential questions around the notion of meeting:

1. For the Patriarch, the promotion of contacts between the Churches is the first essential step that must be followed by "the abolition of all mutual mistrust and bitterness" so that "the love [is] revived and strengthened between the churches".

2. It then lists eleven basic points as a working proposal for future collaboration between the churches; Willem Visser 't Hooft, first secretary of the WCC, that the "With its 1920 encyclical, Constantinople rang the bell of our assembling."

== Notes and references ==
Eastern Orthodox Church titles
Preceded by Joachim III	Ecumenical Patriarch of Constantinople; 1913 – 1918	Succeeded by Meletius IV
