= Germanus III of Constantinople =

Ecumenical Patriarch of Constantinople from 1265 to 1266

- Ecumenical Patriarch of Constantinople
- Church: Church of Constantinople
- In office: 28 May 1265 – 14 September 1266
- Predecessor: Arsenius de Constantinople
- Successor: Joseph I of Constantinople

Personal details
- Born: Germanus
- Died: 1289
- Denomination: Eastern Orthodoxy

Germanus III of Constantinople (Greek: Γερμανός; died 1289) was a Byzantine cleric and Ecumenical Patriarch of Constantinople (28 May 1265 – 14 September 1266). He attended the Second Council of Lyon in 1274 as the representative of Emperor Michael VIII Palaiologos.

== Bibliography ==
- Grumel, Venance (1958). Traité d'études byzantines. Vol. I. Paris: Presses Universitaires de France.

Eastern Orthodox Church titles
Preceded by Arsenius of Constantinople (2)	Ecumenical Patriarch of Constantinople; 1265 – 1266	Succeeded by Joseph I
