= List of 15th-century religious leaders =

This is a list of the top-level leaders for religious groups with at least 50,000 adherents, and that led anytime from January 1, 1401, to December 31, 1500. It should likewise only name leaders listed on other articles and lists.

== Buddhism ==
- Jodo Shinshu (complete list) –
  - Hongwanji-ha
    - Gyonyo, Head Priest (1390–1436)
    - Zonnyo, Head Priest (1436–1457)
    - Rennyo, Head Priest (1457–1489)
    - Jitsunyo, Head Priest (1489–1525)

== Christianity ==
=== Catholicism ===
- Roman Catholic Church (complete list) –

- Boniface IX, Pope (1389–1404)
- Innocent VII, Pope (1404–1406)
- Gregory XII, Pope (1406–1415)
- Martin V, Pope (1417–1431)
- Eugene IV, Pope (1431–1447)
- Nicholas V, Pope (1447–1455)
- Callixtus III, Pope (1455–1458)
- Pius II, Pope (1458–1464)
- Paul II, Pope (1464–1471)
- Sixtus IV, Pope (1471–1484)
- Innocent VIII, Pope (1484–1492)
- Alexander VI, Pope (1492–1503)

=== Eastern Orthodoxy ===
- Church of Constantinople – (complete list), the first among equals in Eastern Orthodoxy

- Matthew I, Ecumenical Patriarch of Constantinople (1397–1410)
- Euthymius II, Ecumenical Patriarch of Constantinople (1410–1416)
- Joseph II, Ecumenical Patriarch of Constantinople (1416–1439)
- Metrophanes II, Ecumenical Patriarch of Constantinople (1440–1443)
- Gregory III Mammas, Ecumenical Patriarch of Constantinople (1443–1450)
- Athanasius II, Ecumenical Patriarch of Constantinople (1450–1453) – see Fall of Constantinople
- Gennadius II Scholarios, Ecumenical Patriarch of Constantinople (1454–1456, c.1463, c.1464–1465)
- Isidore II Xanthopoulos, Ecumenical Patriarch of Constantinople (1456–1462)

According to Kiminas (2009):

- Joasaph I, (1462–1463)
- Gennadius II Scholarios, (1454–1456, 1463, 1464–1465)
- Sophronius I, (1463–1464)
- Gennadius II Scholarios, (1454–1456, 1463, 1464–1465)
- Mark II, (1465–1466)
- Symeon I, (1466, 1471–1475, 1482–1486)

According to Laurent (1968):

- Joasaph I, (1462–1463)
- Gennadius II Scholarios, (1454–1456, 1463, 1464–1465)
- Sophronius I, (1463–1464)
- Gennadius II Scholarios, (1454–1456, 1463, 1464–1465)
- Symeon I, (1465–1466, 1471–1475, 1482–1486)
- Mark II, (1466)

According to Germanos of Sardeis (1933–38):

- Gennadius II Scholarios, (1454–1456, 1462–1463, 1464)
- Sophronius I, (1463–1464)
- Gennadius II Scholarios, (1454–1456, 1462–1463, 1464)
- Joasaph I, (1465–1466)
- Mark II, (1466)
- Symeon I, (1466, 1471–1475, 1482–1486)

- Dionysius I, Ecumenical Patriarch of Constantinople (1466–1471, 1488–1490)
- Symeon I, Ecumenical Patriarch of Constantinople (c.1466, 1471–1475, 1482–1486)
- Raphael I, Ecumenical Patriarch of Constantinople (1475–1476)
- Maximus III, Ecumenical Patriarch of Constantinople (1476–1482)
- Symeon I, Ecumenical Patriarch of Constantinople (c.1466, 1471–1475, 1482–1486)
- Nephon II, Ecumenical Patriarch of Constantinople (1486–1488, 1497–1498, 1502)
- Dionysius I, Ecumenical Patriarch of Constantinople (1466–1471, 1488–1490)
- Maximus IV, Ecumenical Patriarch of Constantinople (1491–1497)
- Nephon II, Ecumenical Patriarch of Constantinople (1486–1488, 1497–1498, 1502)
- Joachim I, Ecumenical Patriarch of Constantinople (1498–1502, 1504)

=== Oriental Orthodoxy ===
- Coptic Orthodox Church, (complete list) –

- John XIII, Pope and Patriarch (1483–1524)

- Ethiopian Church, (complete list) -

- Bartalomewos (1398/9–1436)
- Mikael and Gabriel (1438–1458)
- vacant (1458–1481)
- Yeshaq (1481– c. 1520) and Marqos (1481– c. 1530)

== Islam ==
=== Sunni ===
- Abbasid Caliphate, Cairo (complete list) –

- al-Musta'in, Caliph (1406–1414)
- al-Mu'tadid II, Caliph (1414–1441)
- al-Mustakfi II, Caliph (1441–1451)
- al-Qa'im, Caliph (1451–1455)
- al-Mustanjid, Caliph (1455–1479)
- al-Mutawakkil II, Caliph (1479–1497)
- al-Mustamsik, Caliph (1497–1508, 1516–1517)

=== Shia ===
- Twelver Islam

- Imams (complete list) –

- Muhammad al-Mahdi, Imam (874–present) Shia belief holds that he was hidden by Allah in 874.

- Nizari Isma'ilism (complete list) –

- Islam Shah, Imam (1370–1423)
- Muhammad bin Islam Shah, Imam (1423–1463)
- Mustansir Billah II, Imam (1463–1480)
- Abd al-Salam Shah, Imam (1480–1493)
- Gharib Mirza, Imam (1493–1498)
- Abu Dharr Ali, Imam (1498–1509)

- Zaidiyyah (complete list) –

- al-Mansur Ali bin Salah ad-Din, Imam (1391–1436)
- al-Hadi Ali, Imam (1393–1432)
- al-Mahdi Salah ad-Din, Imam (1436–1445)
- al-Mansur an-Nasir, Imam (1436–1462)
- al-Mutawakkil al-Mutahhar, Imam (1436–1474)
- al-Mu’ayyad Muhammad, Imam (1462–1503)
- an-Nasir Muhammad bin Yusuf, Imam (1474–1488)
- al-Hadi Izz ad-Din, Imam (1474–1495)
- al-Mansur Muhammad, Imam (1475–1504)
- an-Nasir al-Hasan, Imam (1495–1523)

- Mumini (complete list) –

- Radi al-Din bin Muhammad Shāh, Imam (14th–15th-century)
- Tahir bin Radi al-Din, Imam (15th-century)
- Radi al-Din II bin Tahir, Imam (?–1509)

- Tayyibi Isma'ilism –

- Abdallah Fakhr al-Din, Da'i al-Mutlaq (1378–1407)
- al-Hasan Badr al-Din I, Da'i al-Mutlaq (1407–1418)
- Ali Shams al-Din II, Da'i al-Mutlaq (1418–1428)
- Idris Imad al-Din, Da'i al-Mutlaq (1428–1468)
- al-Hasan Badr al-Din II, Da'i al-Mutlaq (1468–1512)

== See also ==
- Religious leaders by year
- List of state leaders in the 15th century
- List of governors of dependent territories in the 15th century
