= Maximus III of Constantinople =

Ecumenical Patriarch of Constantinople from 1476 to 1482

Saint Maximus III of Constantinople
- Ecumenical Patriarch of Constantinople
- Church: Church of Constantinople
- Appointed: 1476 – 3 April 1482
- Predecessor: Raphael I of Constantinople
- Successor: Symeon I of Constantinople

Personal details
- Born: Manuel Christonymos
- Died: 3 April 1482

Sainthood
- Feast day: 17 November
- Venerated in: Eastern Orthodox Church

Maximus III of Constantinople (Greek: Μάξιμος), born Manuel Christonymos (Μανουὴλ Χριστώνυμος; died 3 April 1482), was Ecumenical Patriarch of Constantinople from 1476 to his death in 1482, and a scholar. He is honoured as a saint in the Eastern Orthodox Church and his feast day is 17 November.

== Life ==
Manuel Christonymos was probably a native of the Peloponnese in Greece. He became Grand Ecclesiarch (i.e. Head Sacristan) of the Patriarchate of Constantinople. This ministry soon after the Fall of Constantinople to the Ottoman Empire (1453) took the functions also of the skeuophylax, taking care of the holy treasures and relics of the Patriarchate, and in this position Manuel clashed with Patriarch Gennadius II of Constantinople on economical issues. Under the patronage of the secretary of the Ottoman Sultan, Demetrios Kyritzes, Manuel, together with the Great Chartophylax George Galesiotes, influenced the life of the Church of Constantinople for more than twenty years.

In 1463 he sided with Joasaph I of Constantinople against the request of the politician George Amiroutzes, a Greek nobleman from the former Empire of Trebizond, to marry a second wife because it was a case of bigamy under Christian canon law. As punishment for his support of Joasaph I, Manuel had his nose cut by order of Sultan Mehmed II.

In autumn 1465 (or early 1466) Manuel sponsored the election to the Patriarchate of Mark II of Constantinople, and later he opposed the patriarchs supported by other factions, such as Symeon I of Constantinople and Dionysius I of Constantinople, who on 15 January 1467 stripped him and George Galesiotes of their posts in the administration of the church.

However they soon regained their influence. Manuel was successful in recovering the esteem of sultan Mehmed II, and in 1476 he himself was elected as Patriarch of Constantinople. He was still a lay person, so he first became a monk taking the religious name of Maximus, and the next day he received consecration as a bishop and he was enthroned as Patriarch by the Metropolitan bishop of Heraclea. His reign ended a period of troubles for the Church in the region and was marked by peace and consensus.

Maximus III died on 3 April 1482.

His main literary work is the "Monody on the Capture of Constantinople".

== Notes and references ==
Eastern Orthodox Church titles
Preceded by Raphael I	Ecumenical Patriarch of Constantinople; 1476 – 1482	Succeeded by Symeon I
