= Mark II of Constantinople =

Ecumenical Patriarch of Constantinople from 1465 to 1466

- Ecumenical Patriarch of Constantinople
- Church: Church of Constantinople
- In office: Autumn 1465 – Autumn 1466
- Predecessor: Gennadius II of Constantinople
- Successor: Symeon I of Constantinople

Personal details
- Died: After 1467
- Denomination: Eastern Orthodoxy

Mark II of Constantinople (Greek: Μᾶρκος Ξυλοκαράβης; Bulgarian: Марк Ксилокарав; died after 1467) was Ecumenical Patriarch of Constantinople from 1465 to 1466. In 1467 he became Archbishop of Ohrid, a post he held until his death.

== Life ==
Concerning the early life of Mark our main source is a document of the Senate of Venice dated 26 June 1466, which orders the Venetian government in Crete to prevent Mark and his father in case they tried to seek refuge on the island. From this document scholars, such as Laurent, deduce that in June 1466 Mark II was actually Patriarch, that he and his family had previously been in Crete and that they opposed the East-West Union of Churches established in the Council of Florence and supported by the Republic of Venice.

Mark became Metropolitan of Adrianople in 1464, and in autumn 1465 (or early 1466) he was elected Patriarch of Constantinople with the support of lay archons such as the Chartophylax George Galesiotes and the Grand Ecclesiarch (i.e. Head Sacristan) Manuel (the future Patriarch Maximus III of Constantinople), as well as the secretary of the Sultan Demetrios Kyritzes. On the other hand, it is known that some bishops refused to commemorate him during the Divine Liturgy, as a sign that they did not recognise him as patriarch, probably accusing him of simony.

Mark II clashed mainly with the faction composed of the nobles of the former Empire of Trebizond who were forced to move to Constantinople after Trebizond's fall to the Ottomans in 1461. This faction supported its own candidate for the patriarchal throne, the future Patriarch Symeon I of Constantinople. Symeon was successful in obtaining the throne, giving 2000 pieces of gold as a present to the Ottoman government, thus beginning a simoniac practice that marked the history of the Patriarchate of Constantinople for the following centuries. According to Laurent however, who places the patriarchate of Mark II after the one of Symeon I, it was Mark II that bought the patriarchal office paying 2000 pieces of gold.

Whichever the cause, Mark II was deposed in humiliation from the throne, facing lapidation in autumn 1466 or early 1467. However, he was soon rehabilitated and appointed by Sultan Mehmed II as Archbishop of Ohrid. The Archbishopric of Ohrid was at the time the semi-autonomous main religious center of the Ottoman Bulgaria. The date of his death is not known.

== Disputed chronology ==
There is no consensus among scholars concerning the chronology of Mark II's reign.

Many scholars, such as Kiminas (2009), Runciman (1985), Grumel (1958) and Bishop Germanos of Sardeis (1933–1938), as well as the official website of the Ecumenical Patriarchate, follow the chronicles of Dorotheos of Monemvasia and place the reign of Mark II before Symeon I of Constantinople, even if with some slightly different suggestions about the precise dates of the reign, however generally in the range from 1465 to 1467.

Laurent (1968), followed by Podskalsky (1988), believes that the clashes with Symeon I happened when Mark II was still Metropolitan of Adrianople, and place Symeon I's reign before Mark II's. For a comparison of the main proposals, see the List of Patriarchs of Constantinople. Laurent alone suggests a second short patriarchate of Mark after the first reign of Dionysius I of Constantinople at end 1471.

== Bibliography ==
- Kiminas, Demetrius (2009). The Ecumenical Patriarchate - A History of Its Metropolitanates with Annotated Hierarch Catalogs. Wildside Press. ISBN 9781434458766.
- Laurent, Vitalien (1968). "Les premiers patriarches de Constantinople sous la domination turque (1454–1476) - Succession et chronologie d'après un catalogue inédit". Revue des études byzantines. 26: 229–263. doi:10.3406/rebyz.1968.1407.
- Runciman, Steven (1985) [1968]. The Great Church in Captivity - A Study of the Patriarchate of Constantinople from the Eve of the Turkish Conquest to the Greek War of Independence (2nd ed.). Cambridge University Press. ISBN 9780521313100.

Eastern Orthodox Church titles
Preceded by Gennadius II (3)	Ecumenical Patriarch of Constantinople; 1465 – 1466	Succeeded by Symeon I
