= Patriarch Mark II =

Patriarch Mark II may refer to:

- Mark II of Alexandria, Pope of Alexandria in 141–152
- Mark II of Constantinople, Ecumenical Patriarch in 1465–1466
