= Symeon I of Constantinople =

Three-time Ecumenical Patriarch of Constantinople from 1466 to 1486

- Ecumenical Patriarch of Constantinople
- Church: Church of Constantinople
- In office: Autumn 1466 – end 1466; Late 1471 – early 1475; April 1482 – autumn 1486
- Predecessor: Mark II of Constantinople; Dionysius I of Constantinople; Maximus III of Constantinople
- Successor: Dionysius I of Constantinople; Raphael I of Constantinople; Nephon II of Constantinople

Personal details
- Died: Autumn 1486
- Denomination: Eastern Orthodoxy

Symeon I of Constantinople (Greek: Συμεὼν ὁ Τραπεζούντιος; died autumn 1486) was Ecumenical Patriarch of Constantinople three times: for a short time in 1466, from 1471 to 1475 and from 1482 to 1486. In 1484 he presided over the Synod of Constantinople of 1484 which repudiated the Council of Florence.

== Life ==
Symeon was born between 1400 and 1420 to a noble family of the Empire of Trebizond. After Trebizond's fall to the Ottomans in 1461, all the nobles of the former empire were forced by Mehmed II to move to Constantinople and Symeon too, who was already a monk, went to the capital. The Trapezuntine nobility formed a separate faction among the Greeks of the capital, led probably by the scholar and politician George Amiroutzes. This faction supported Symeon as its own candidate for the patriarchal throne against the faction led by lay archons such as the Great Chartophylax George Galesiotes and the Grand Ecclesiarch (i.e. Head Sacristan) Manuel, the future Patriarch Maximus III of Constantinople.

In autumn 1466 Symeon successfully obtained the throne after he presented the Ottoman government with 2000 pieces of gold, thus beginning a simoniac practice that marked the history of the Patriarchate of Constantinople for the following centuries. Here a new player made an entrance in disputing the patriarchal throne, Mara Branković, daughter of the Serbian Despot Đurađ Branković and one of the stepmothers of Mehmed II. Although Mara remained a lifelong Christian, she was quite influential with Mehmed II. Mara was outraged by the simoniac action of Symeon I, and she went to Constantinople to complain to Mehmed II. In response to her requests, and to a donation by her of 2000 pieces of gold, the Sultan deposed Symeon I and appointed to the Patriarchate the candidate of Mara, Dionysius I of Constantinople. Symeon I retired for some years in a monastery near Stenimachos.

The reign of Dionysius I was marked by the opposition to him by both of the other factions, including Symeon I's. He was finally deposed at the end of 1471 after false accusations that he had converted to Islam and had been circumcised. Afterwards Symeon I paid a further 2000 pieces of gold and allegedly promised to the Sultan to suppress designs for an anti-Ottoman revolt in Trebizond, and so he became Patriarch. Actually, in May 1472 there was a failed attempt to capture the city led by Caterino Zeno and Alexios Komnenos (a nephew of David of Trebizond), supported by Uzun Hassan. Symeon I sided with the Ottoman Sultan and in June 1472 he deposed the Metropolitan of Trebizond Pankratios, who was involved in the rebellion, and replaced him with another bishop, Dorotheos, a former Metropolitan of Athens, more aligned with the Ottomans. The second reign of Symeon I was marked by an increased debt up to 7000 florins, and on 10 October 1474, the Holy Synod also accepted to pay an annual fee of 2000 florins to the Ottoman Government. Consequently, in the winter of 1474, Symeon I was forced to begin searching for funds. On his return to Constantinople in early 1475, Symeon I was outbid by Raphael I of Constantinople, probably supported by Mara Branković. Raphael I could not pay the amount he had promised after a year and he was overthrown by Maximus III of Constantinople, the leader of the faction of the Constantinopolitan nobles.

Maximus III died on 3 April 1482 and Symeon I returned on the throne for the third time until autumn 1486, when he was succeeded by Nephon II of Constantinople. Symeon I died shortly after, surely before 1488, without making his will, and his rich inheritance was heavily contended for after his death. The most remarkable act of his third and last reign was the Synod of Constantinople of 1484.

== Disputed chronology ==
There is no consensus among scholars concerning the chronology of the first reign of Symeon I. Many scholars, such as Kiminas (2009), Runciman (1985), Grumel (1958) and Bishop Germanos of Sardeis (1933–1938), as well as the official website of the Ecumenical Patriarchate, follow the chronicles of Pseudo-Dorotheos of Monemvasia and place the reign of Symeon I after Mark II of Constantinople.

Laurent (1968), followed by Podskalsky (1988), believes that the clashes with Symeon I happened when Mark II was still Metropolitan of Adrianople, and place Symeon I's reign before Mark II's. For a comparison of the main proposals, see the Ecumenical patriarchs of Constantinople.

== Bibliography ==
- Kiminas, Demetrius (2009). The Ecumenical Patriarchate - A History of Its Metropolitanates with Annotated Hierarch Catalogs. Wildside Press. ISBN 9781434458766.
- Laurent, Vitalien (1968). "Les premiers patriarches de Constantinople sous la domination turque (1454–1476) - Succession et chronologie d'après un catalogue inédit". Revue des études byzantines. 26: 229–263. doi:10.3406/rebyz.1968.1407.
- Runciman, Steven (1985) [1968]. The Great Church in Captivity - A Study of the Patriarchate of Constantinople from the Eve of the Turkish Conquest to the Greek War of Independence (2nd ed.). Cambridge University Press. ISBN 9780521313100.

Eastern Orthodox Church titles
Preceded by Mark II	Ecumenical Patriarch of Constantinople; 1466	Succeeded by Dionysius I
Preceded by Dionysius I	Ecumenical Patriarch of Constantinople; 1471 – 1475	Succeeded by Raphael I
Preceded by Maximus III	Ecumenical Patriarch of Constantinople; 1482 – 1486	Succeeded by Nephon II
