= Patriarch Dionysius I =

Patriarch Dionysius I may refer to:

- Patriarch Dionysius I Telmaharoyo, head of the Syriac Orthodox Church in 818–845
- Dionysius I of Constantinople, Ecumenical Patriarch in 1466–1471 and 1488–1490
