= Dionysius I of Constantinople =

Ecumenical Patriarch of Constantinople from 1466 to 1471 and from 1488 to 1490

Saint Dionysius I of Constantinople
- Ecumenical Patriarch of Constantinople
- Church: Church of Constantinople
- In office: End 1466 – end 1471; July 1488 – end 1490
- Predecessor: Symeon I of Constantinople; Nephon II of Constantinople
- Successor: Symeon I of Constantinople; Maximus IV of Constantinople
- Previous post: Metropolitan of Philippopolis

Personal details
- Born: Dimitsana
- Died: 1492 Drama

Sainthood
- Feast day: 23 November
- Venerated in: Eastern Orthodox Church

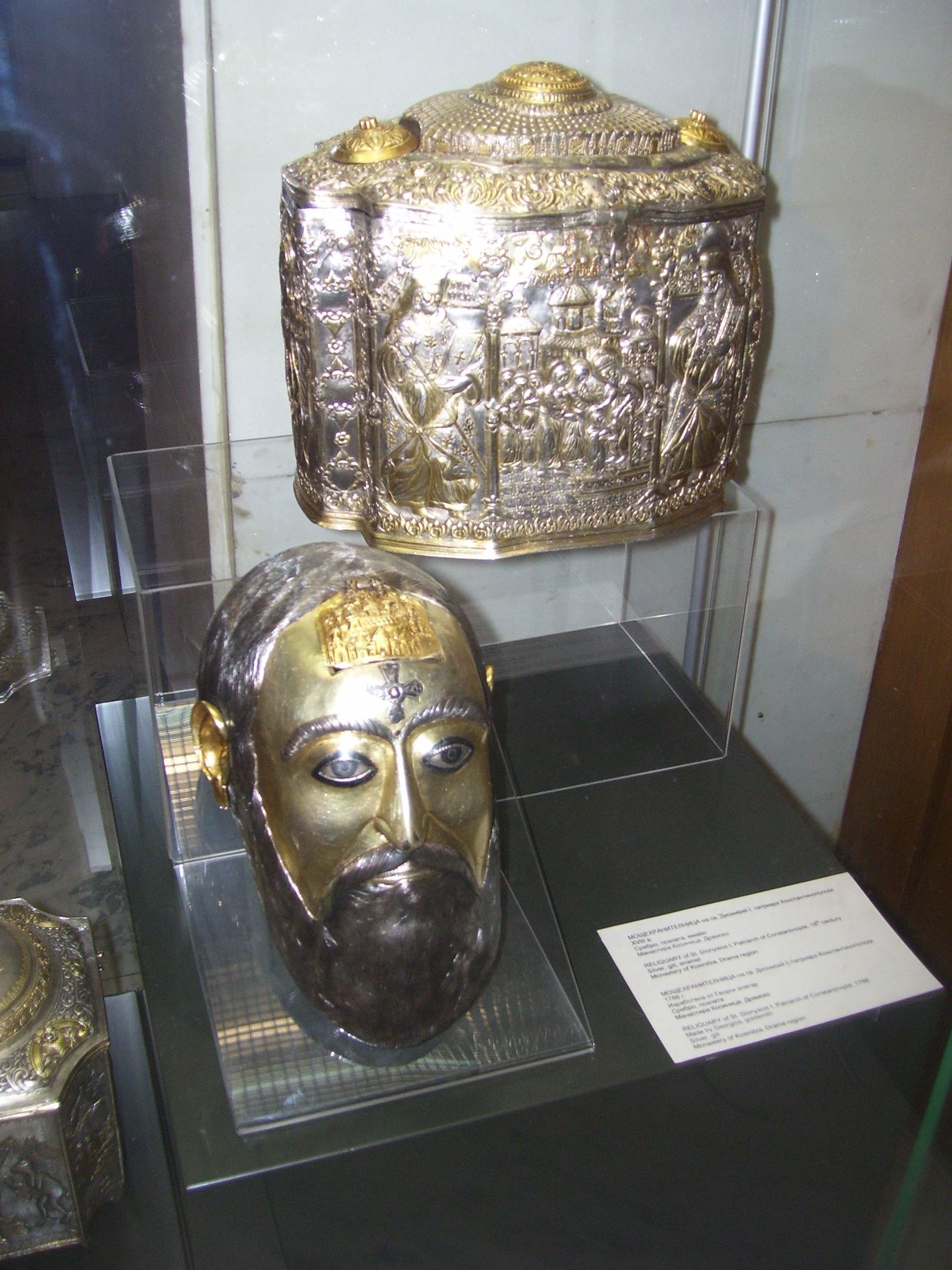
Patriarch Dionysius I of Constantinople

Dionysius I of Constantinople (Greek: Διονύσιος; died 1492) was Ecumenical Patriarch of Constantinople two times, from 1466 to 1471 and from 1488 to 1490. He is honoured as a saint in the Eastern Orthodox Church and his feast day is 23 November.

== Life ==
Dionysius was born in Dimitsana, in the Peloponnese. He became a monk and entered in a monastery in Constantinople where he was a pupil of Mark of Ephesus, Archbishop of Ephesus, who ordained him as priest. During the Fall of Constantinople in 1453 he was enslaved by the Ottomans, but he was bought and freed some time later in Adrianople by an archon known as Kyritzes (probably Demetrios Apokaukos, one of the two Greek secretaries of Sultan Mehmed II).

Following his release Dionysius became highly thought of by Mara Branković, daughter of the Serbian Despot Đurađ Branković and one of the wives of Sultan Murad II, the father of Mehmed II. Although Mara remained a lifelong Christian, she was quite influential with Mehmed II. Supported by Mara, Dionysius was appointed Metropolitan of Philippopolis by Patriarch Gennadius II of Constantinople.

At that time the Patriarchal throne was contested by two factions, one led by the lay archons George Galesiotes (the Great Chartophylax) and Manuel Christonymos (the future Patriarch Maximus III of Constantinople), the other composed of the nobles of the former Empire of Trebizond who were forced to move to Constantinople after Trebizond's fall to the Ottomans in 1461. The former supported Mark II of Constantinople as Patriarch, the latter supported Symeon I of Constantinople.

In 1466 Symeon I was successful in deposing Mark II and obtaining the throne after presenting the Ottoman government with 2000 pieces of gold. Symeon I's first reign lasted only a short time because his simoniac action outraged Mara Branković, who went to Constantinople to complain to Mehmed II. Further to her requests, and to a donation by her of 2000 pieces of gold, the Sultan deposed Symeon I and appointed to the Patriarchate the candidate of Mara, i.e. Dionysius. This succession of patriarchs is proposed by scholars such as Kiminas, Runciman, Grumel and Gemanos of Sardeis, while Laurent and Podskalsky suggest that it was Mark II and not Symeon I who bought the throne the first time, placing the reign of Mark II after the one of Symeon I. There is however consensus on the fact that Dionysius, who was not involved in any of the two factions, became Patriarch due to the intervention of Mara on his behalf.

The date of appointment of Dionysius as Patriarch is most likely the end of 1466 because on 15 January 1467 he signed an act by which the Holy Synod stripped of any ecclesiastic dignity George Galesiotes and Manuel Christonymos. However these two lay nobles soon regained their influence and strongly opposed Dionysius I, who was opposed also by the supporters of Symeon I.

Dionysius I reigned with the protection of Mara till the end of 1471 when his opponents accused him of having been converted to Islam for a short time and of being consequently circumcised. A synod was gathered by his opponents to judge him. Despite revealing his penis so that all present could verify that he was not circumcised, he was deposed and replaced by Symeon I of Constantinople. Laurent suggests a second short patriarchate of Mark II of Constantinople before Symeon I.

After his deposition in 1471, Dionysius I moved to the monastery of Eikosifinissa in Drama. In July 1488 he was elected as Patriarch for a second term supported by Greek public opinion, and he reigned remaining in his monastery. He was deposed at the end of 1490 because the Athonite monks were annoyed by him. Dionysius I died in 1492.

== Bibliography ==
- Kiminas, Demetrius (2009). The Ecumenical Patriarchate - A History of Its Metropolitanates with Annotated Hierarch Catalogs. Wildside Press. ISBN 9781434458766.
- Laurent, Vitalien (1968). "Les premiers patriarches de Constantinople sous la domination turque (1454–1476) - Succession et chronologie d'après un catalogue inédit". Revue des études byzantines. 26: 229–263. doi:10.3406/rebyz.1968.1407.
- Runciman, Steven (1985) [1968]. The Great Church in Captivity - A Study of the Patriarchate of Constantinople from the Eve of the Turkish Conquest to the Greek War of Independence (2nd ed.). Cambridge University Press. ISBN 9780521313100.

Eastern Orthodox Church titles
| Preceded by Symeon I | Ecumenical Patriarch of Constantinople; 1466 – 1471 | Succeeded by Nephon II |
| Preceded by Symeon I (2) | Ecumenical Patriarch of Constantinople; 1488 – 1490 | Succeeded by Maximus IV |
