= Synod of Constantinople (1484) =

Ecumenical synod of the Eastern Orthodox Church (1483-1484)

The Synod of Constantinople in 1484 was an Ecumenical synod of the Orthodox Catholic Church (aka Eastern Orthodox Church) that took place from 1 September 1483 to 31 August 1484. It was the first synod to condemn the Council of Florence and defined the ritual for reception of "Latins" to the Orthodox and Catholic Church of the Greeks.

== History ==
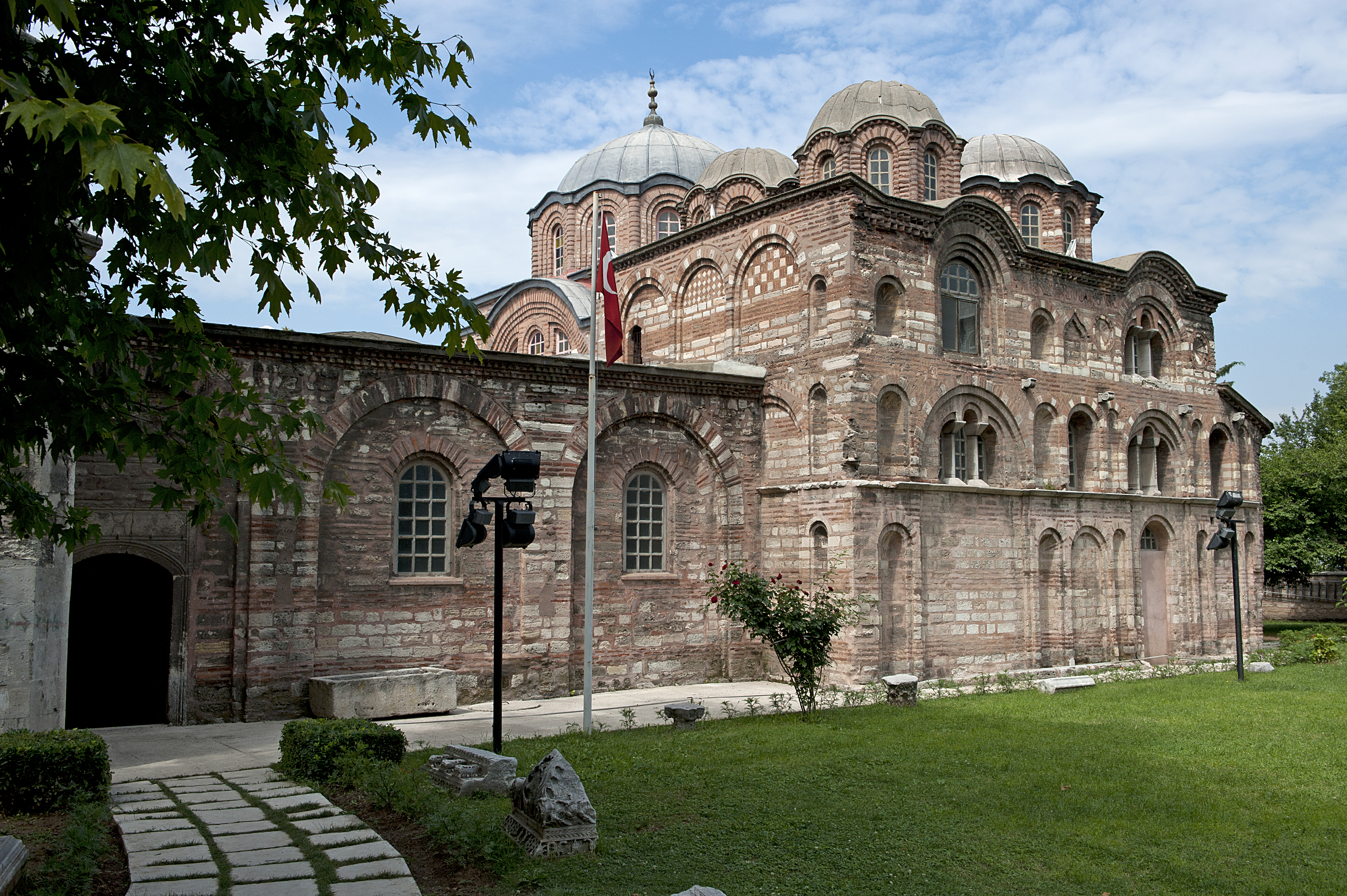
The council took place in the Pammakaristos Church (today Fethiye Museum-Mosque)

After the 1453 fall of Constantinople, the Ottoman government organized the Patriarchate of Constantinople as a department within the Islamic state and supported its Orthodox heritage and anti-Latin feelings with the political objective of moving the captured Greeks away from Western Europe. Some believe that the Patriarch of Constantinople at the time, Symeon I, was serving the interests of the Ottoman Sultan during his second reign with his policy towards Trebizond and, during his last reign, by convening a synod to formally ratify the condemnation of the Council of Florence. The matter of the Council of Florence was, though, a continuing matter of contention among the Eastern Churches that needed to be addressed with a synod of the same claimed status as that of the Council of Florence, that is as an ecumenical council.

The Synod of Constantinople was convened by Patriarch Symeon I and lasted from September 1483 until August 1484. It was held in the patriarchal Pammakaristos Church, in the presence of representatives of the Patriarchs of Alexandria, Antioch and Jerusalem (the latter sees then being under the Mamluk Sultanate of Cairo). The synod decreed against the doctrines of Florence and wrote a ritual for admission to the Eastern Orthodox Church of those converted from the heresies of the Council of Florence (i.e. Roman Catholics). This issue was quite relevant in such years due to the conquests by the Ottomans of areas previously subjected to Western rule (e.g. the Duchy of Athens) and to the Ottoman system of government of the minorities (the millet system) which subjected Latins to the civil authority of the Patriarch of Constantinople, causing numerous conversions to Orthodoxy.

The Synod referred to the definitions of the Council of Florence "as being spurious doctrines and alien from the Catholic Church" and the Synod "judged it needful to overthrow and consign to oblivion all that was ill-done and rashly determined at Florence under colour of synodal authority". The Synod decided: "by this present synodical decree we do also annul the council that was convened at Florence, and we declare all the chapters contained in the decree there issued to be henceforth void, inoperative, and of no effect. We regard and hold that assembly as one which in truth never came lawfully into being, inasmuch as it hath defined doctrines discordant and adverse to the eight holy and ecumenical councils that preceded it, touching the question of the procession of the Holy Spirit and other matters besides. Moreover, we abhor also the sacrifice made with unleavened bread, and all the other things which were accepted at Florence and contained in the decree there enacted; as we have already declared, we are in full agreement in all points both of doctrine and of the usages of the Church, whether written or unwritten, with the holy and ecumenical councils afore-mentioned." The Synod then approved a ritual for the reception for the converts, which required Chrismation and a written abjuration of the Council of Florence (but not a re-baptism). Further, the council endorsed the positions expressed by patriarch Photius in the fourth council of Constantinople (879) and the decrees of the synod of Constantinople of 1285 and rejected the filioque.

== Legacy ==
The 1484 Synod of Constantinople was the first synod to condemn the Council of Florence, as the so-called 1450 Synod of Saint Sophia never took place and its documents are a forgery of the early 17th century. However the decrees of the 1484 synod were not universally implemented and cases of inter-communion between Latins and Greeks went on in the regions subjected to the Venetian Republic until the 18th century. A later synod of Constantinople in 1755 required Roman Catholics and monophysite Armenians to be baptised according to the ancient rite of full triple immersion rather than by sprinkling or pouring.

== Sources ==
- Paschalidis, Symeon (2016). "Concilium Constantinopolitanum 1484". In Melloni, A. (ed.). The Great Councils of the Orthodox Churches From Constantinople 861 to Moscow 2000, [Corpus Christianorum Conciliorum Oecumenicorum Generaliumque Decreta (COGD IV.1)]. Turnhout: Brepols Publishers.
