= Dorotheos II of Trebizond =

Dorotheos II (Greek: Δωρόθεος Βʹ) was the second metropolitan bishop of Trebizond under Ottoman rule. His tenure began in 1472.

The origin of Dorotheos is unclear, nor is anything about his early life known except that prior to his appointment to the see of Trebizond in 1472, he was Metropolitan of Athens as mentioned in his act of election to Trebizond. His activity in Athens is equally unknown, however, nor is he mentioned by any historians of the region. Dorotheos was appointed to Trebizond in succession to Pankratios, who had only months before been appointed metropolitan after a vacancy dating back to the capture of Trebizond by the Ottomans in 1461.

Dorotheos was sent to Trebizond after the forced resignation of his predecessor. Pankratios had been appointed, after such a long interregnum, to calm the anti-Ottoman agitation among the Christians of the Pontus region around Trebizond. This agitation was particularly dangerous as it was encouraged by the neighbouring Aq Qoyunlu sultan Uzun Hassan, who was linked through family ties with the former imperial house of Trebizond and backed the designs of a scion of that house, Alexios Komnenos. In order to counteract the threat of a rebellion, the Ottoman Sultan elevated the Trapezuntine Symeon I to Patriarch of Constantinople, and the latter immediately appointed Pankratios to the metropolitan throne of Trebizond. It appears, however, that Pankratios was unable to calm the situation, or that he may have himself been actively involved in stirring up discontent, and after a few months the Sultan demanded his resignation. Dorotheos, who followed, seems to have been more successful, although no details are known about his tenure or his later life, except that he went on to become metropolitan of Caesarea. He may have been the immediate predecessor of the next known metropolitan of Trebizond, Gennadios I, attested in 1501, but this can not be verified.

Eastern Orthodox Church titles
Unknown Title last held by Isidore	Metropolitan bishop of Athens unknown – 1472	Unknown Title next held by Anthimus II
Preceded by Pankratios	Metropolitan bishop of Trebizond; 1472 – unknown	Unknown Title next held by Gennadios I
