= Maximus IV of Constantinople =

Ecumenical Patriarch of Constantinople from 1491 to 1497

- Ecumenical Patriarch of Constantinople
- Church: Church of Constantinople
- Appointed: Early 1491
- Term ended: Early 1497
- Predecessor: Dionysius I of Constantinople
- Successor: Nephon II of Constantinople
- Previous post: Metropolitan of Serres

Personal details
- Denomination: Eastern Orthodoxy

Maximus IV of Constantinople (Greek: Μάξιμος), previously known as Manasses (Μανασσῆς), was an Orthodox Christian monk and bishop. He was Ecumenical Patriarch of Constantinople from 1491 to 1497.

== Life ==
He was abbot of the Vatopedi monastery on Mount Athos before being appointed by Symeon I of Constantinople as Metropolitan bishop of Serres, which he governed under the religious name of Manasses.

In the first months of 1491, he was elected Patriarch of Constantinople with the support of the monks of Mount Athos. On his election, he changed his name to Maximus, an unparalleled case in the history of the Ecumenical Patriarchate because usually a monastic name is maintained throughout an ecclesiastic career. As Patriarch, he defended the rights of Orthodox Christians living in territories under the Republic of Venice.

During his reign arose some pieces of gossip about him, not specified by the sources, which led to his deposition in early 1497.

After his resignation, he remained actively involved with ecclesiastic issues, even plotting against his successor Nephon II of Constantinople, until he was forced to retire in the monastery of Vatopedi, where he died at an unknown date.

== Notes and references ==
Eastern Orthodox Church titles
Preceded by Dionysus I (2)	Ecumenical Patriarch of Constantinople; 1491 – 1497	Succeeded by Nephon II
