= Pankratios of Trebizond =

Pankratios or Pangratios (Greek: Παγκράτιος) was the first Metropolitan bishop of Trebizond following the Ottoman conquest of the Empire of Trebizond in 1461.

Nothing is known about Pankratios' origin or early career prior to his appointment as metropolitan. The see had been vacant since the capture of Trebizond and the incorporation of the Empire of Trebizond to the Ottoman Empire in 1461, as the bulk of the Trapezuntine upper classes, including the secular nobility and the ecclesiastical hierarchy, were transferred to the Ottoman capital, Constantinople. It was not until ca. 1472 that the vacancy was addressed. This was partly the result of the appointment of the Trapezuntine Symeon I as Patriarch of Constantinople, but owed more to political considerations on the part of the Ottoman Sultan, Mehmed II: the Christians of the Pontus region around Trebizond had been restive against Ottoman rule, and were encouraged by the neighbouring Aq Qoyunlu sultan Uzun Hassan. The latter was linked through family ties with the former imperial house of Trebizond, and lent his support to a scion of that house, Alexios Komnenos. In order to counteract the threat of a rebellion, the Sultan elevated Symeon to the patriarchal throne, and he immediately appointed Pankratios to the metropolitan throne of Trebizond. It appears, however, that the latter was unable to satisfy the Sultan's expectations about calming the province, and already after a few months Mehmed II demanded his replacement. Pankratios was succeeded by Dorotheos II, and nothing further is known of him thereafter.

Unknown	Metropolitan bishop of Trebizond; 1472	Succeeded by Dorotheos II
