= Pammakaristos Church =

Greek Orthodox Byzantine church in Istanbul, Turkey

- Μονή Παμμακάριστου; Fethiye Camii
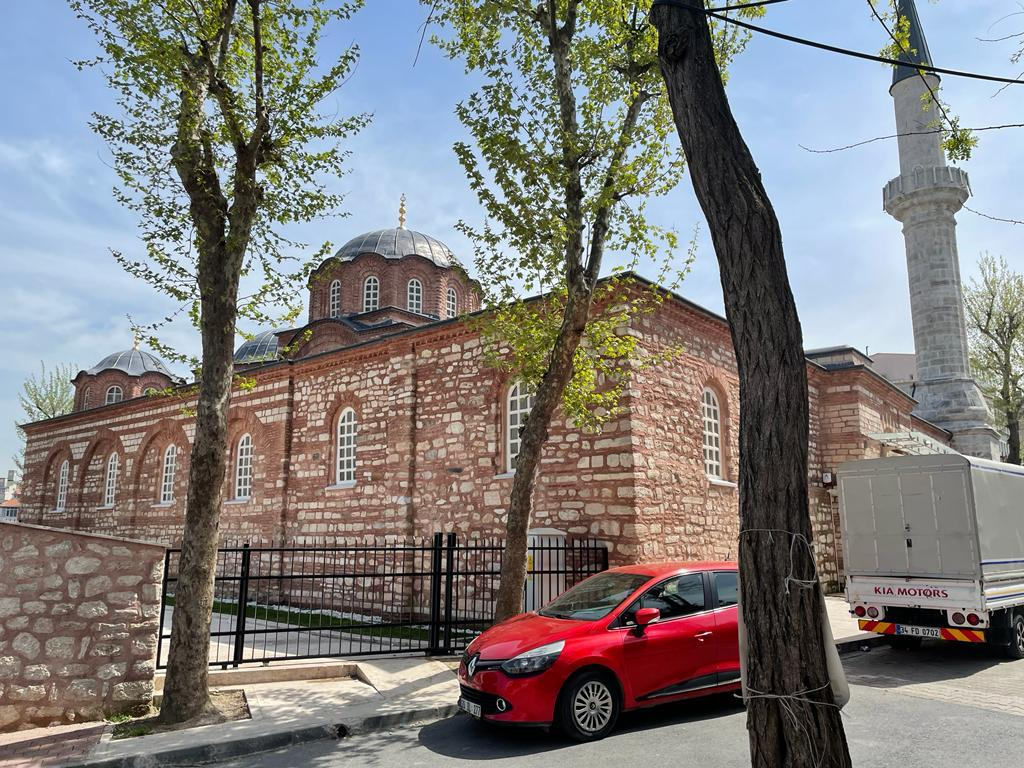
- Pammakaristos Church after restoration

- Location within the Fatih district of Istanbul

Religion
- Affiliation: Islam (currently); Greek Orthodox Church (previously)

Location
- Location: Istanbul, Turkey
- Coordinates: 41°01′45″N 28°56′47″E

Architecture
- Type: Church
- Style: Byzantine architecture, Greek architecture, Islamic architecture
- Minaret: 2

The Pammakaristos Church, also known as the Church of Theotokos Pammakaristos (Greek: Θεοτόκος ἡ Παμμακάριστος, "All-Blessed Mother of God"), is one of the most famous Byzantine church buildings in Istanbul, Turkey, and was the last pre-Ottoman building to house the Ecumenical Patriarchate. Converted in 1591 into the Fethiye Mosque (Turkish: Fethiye Camii, "mosque of the conquest"), it is today partly a museum housed in a side chapel or parekklesion. One of the most important examples of Constantinople's Palaiologan architecture, the mosque contains the largest quantity of Byzantine mosaics in Istanbul after the Hagia Sophia and The Chora.

The mosque-museum is in the Çarşamba neighbourhood of the Fatih district inside the walled city of old Istanbul.

== History ==
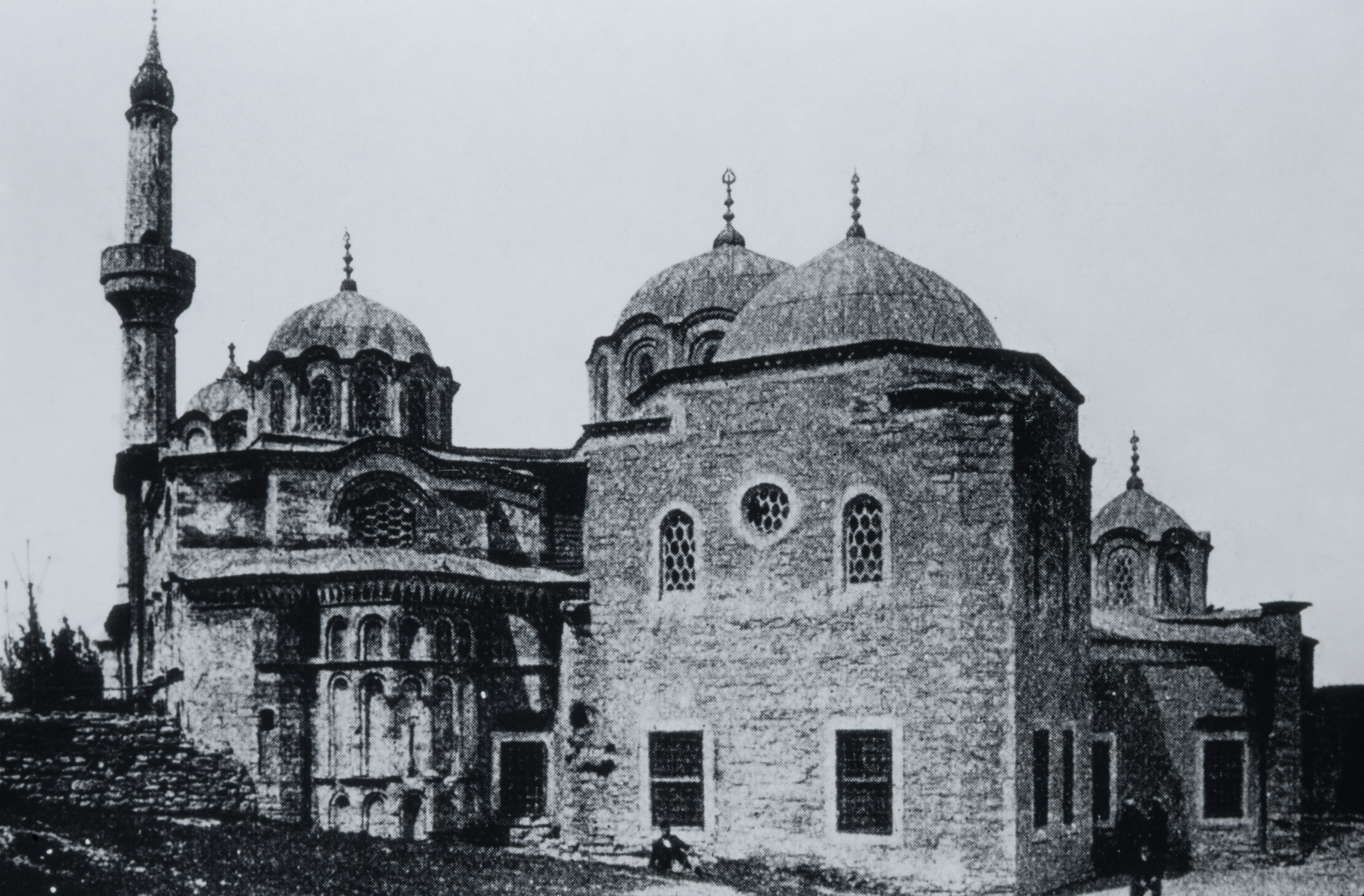
Fethiye Camii, exterior, view from east, between 1949 and 1963.

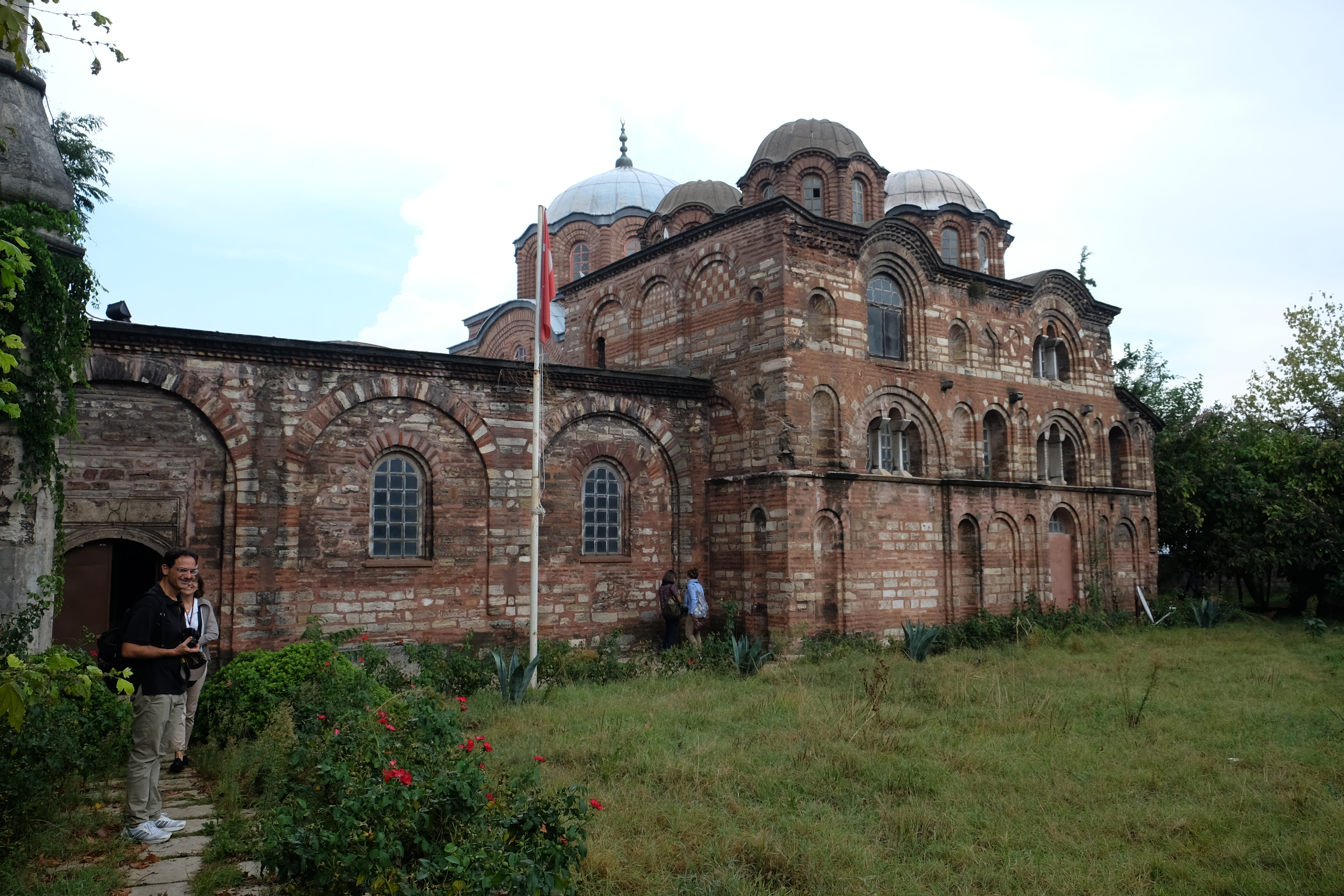
Pammakaristos Church before restoration

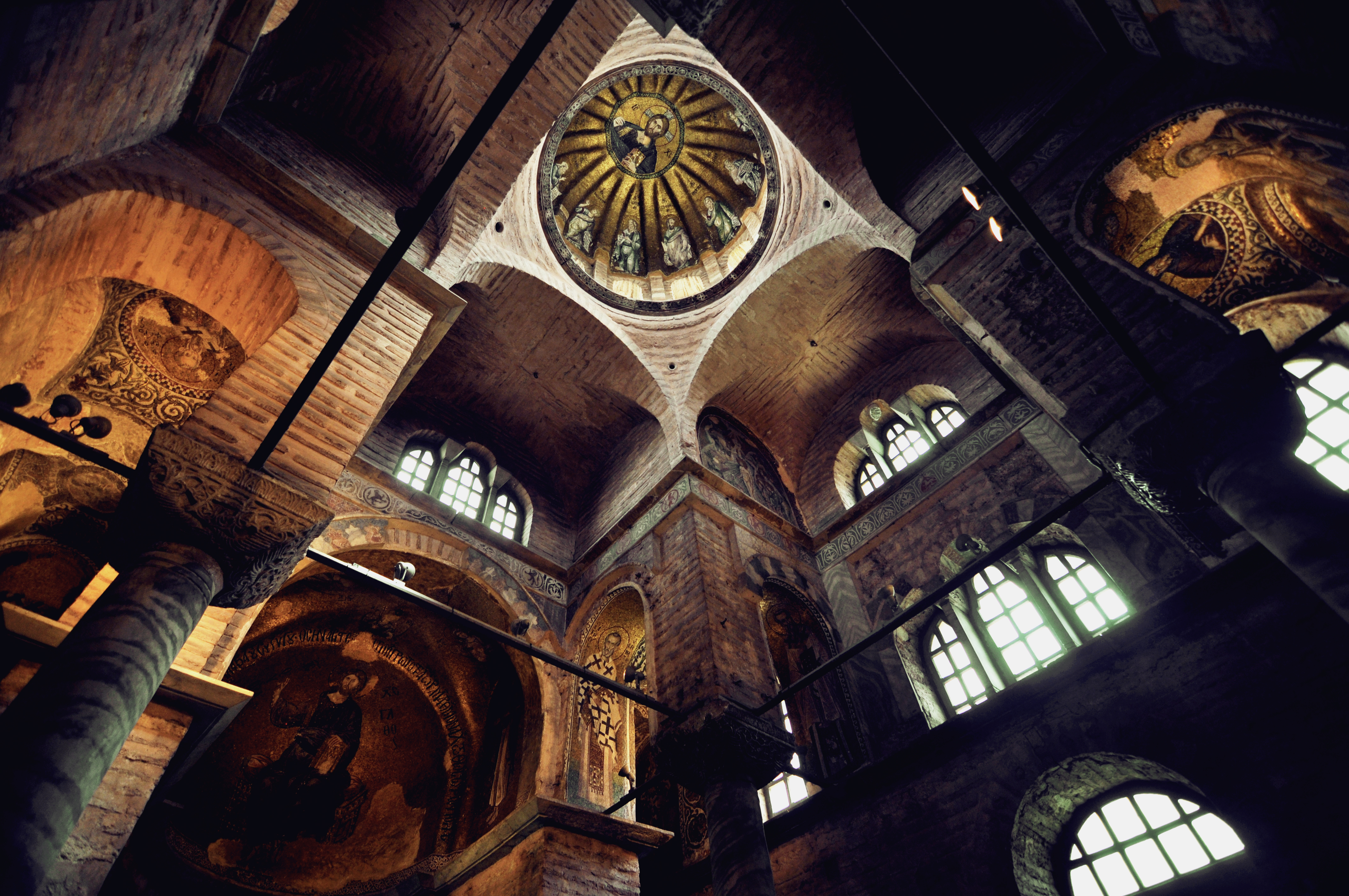
Dome view of Fethiye Museum

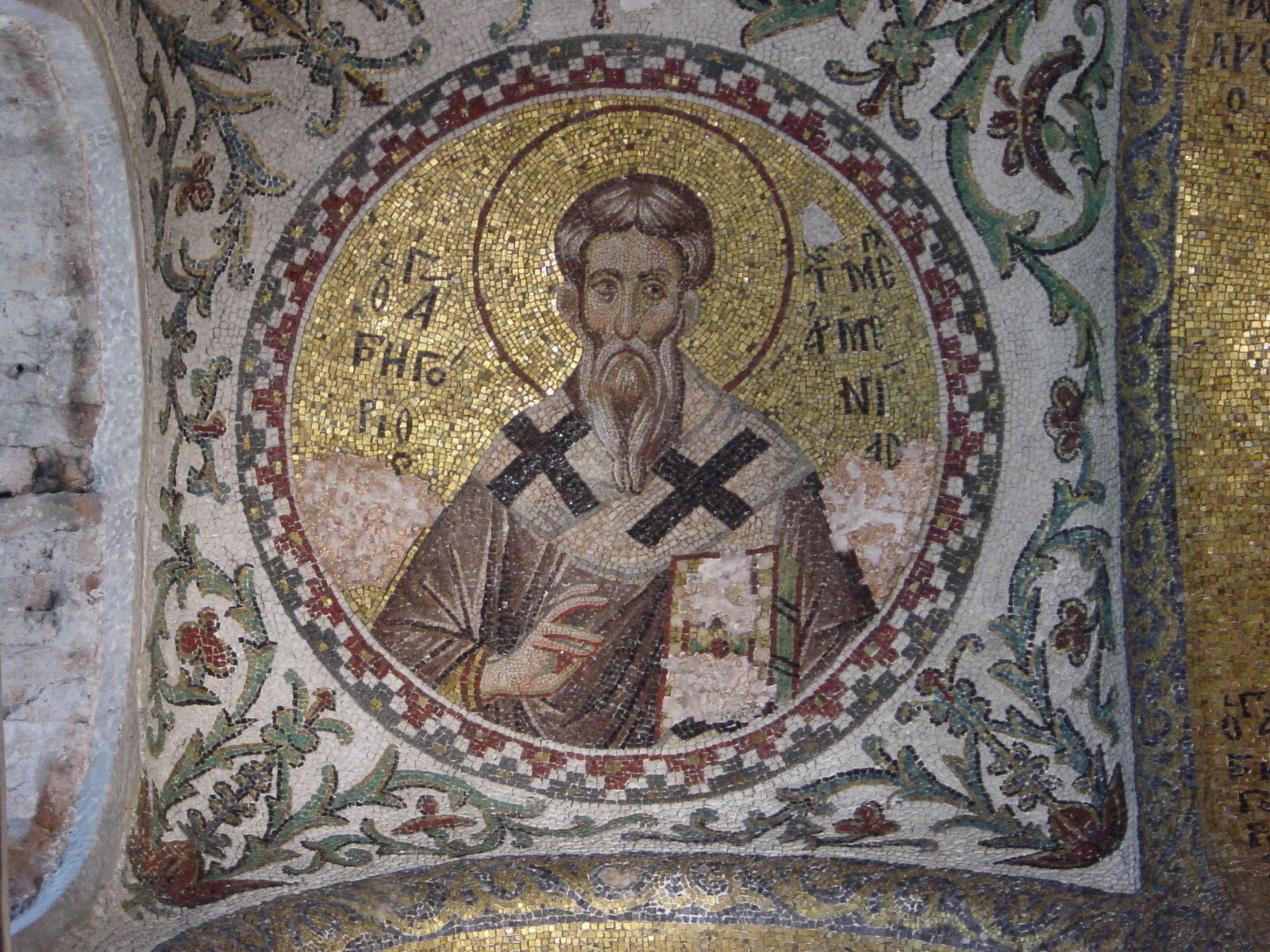
St. Gregory the Illuminator

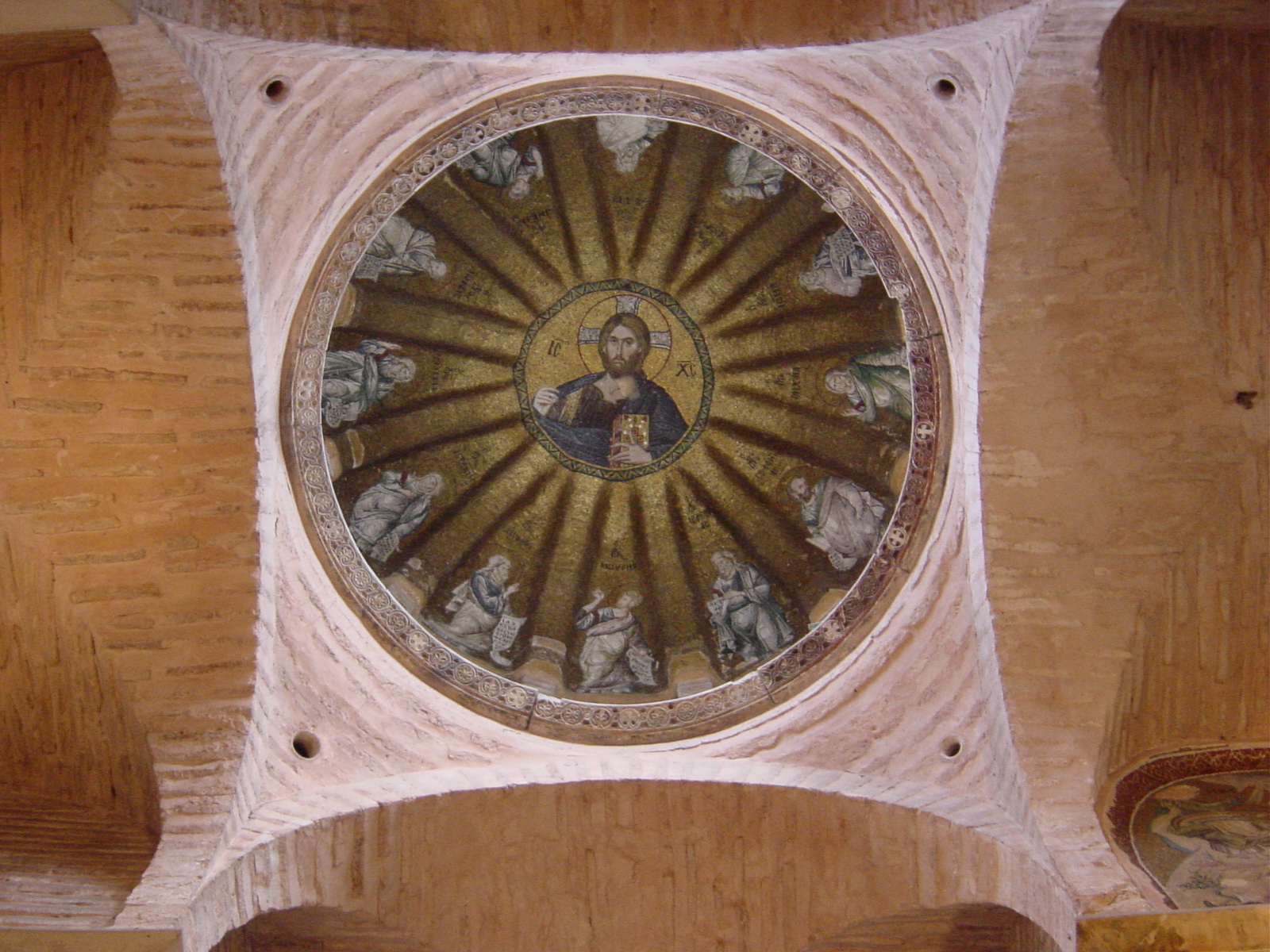
View of the central dome of the parekklesion with Christ Pantocrator surrounded by the prophets of the Old Testament

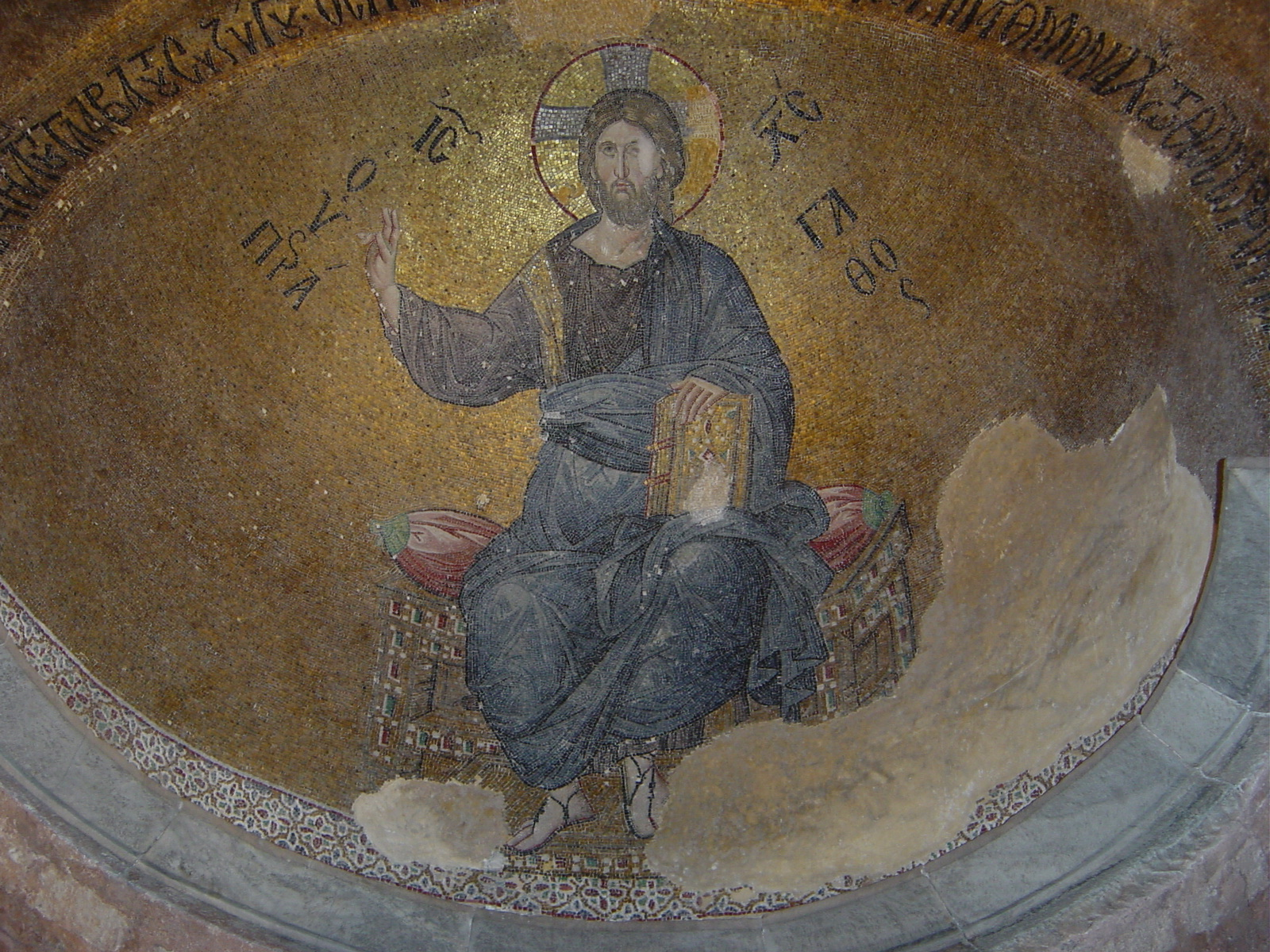
Mosaic depicting Christ

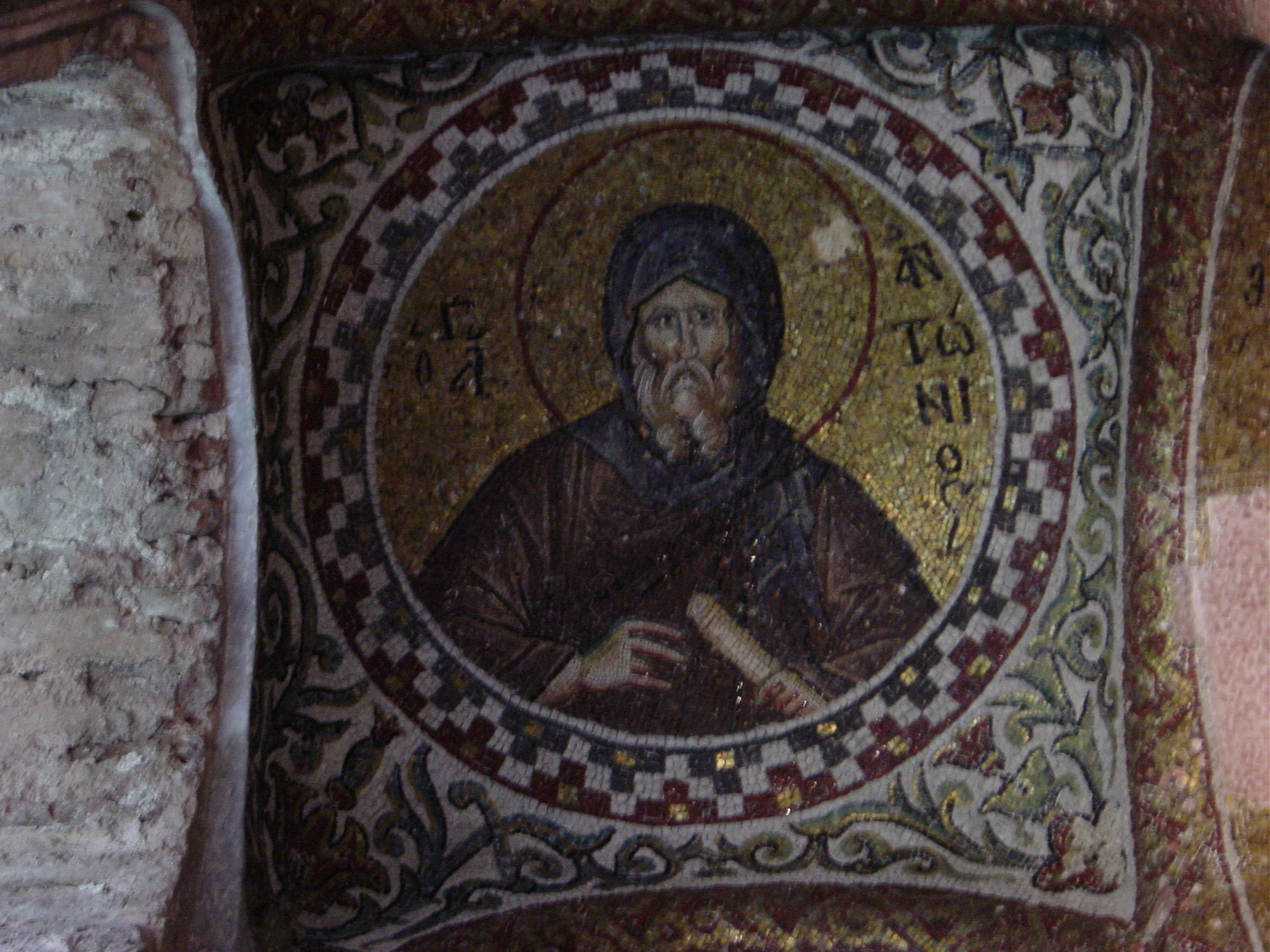
Mosaic of Saint Anthony

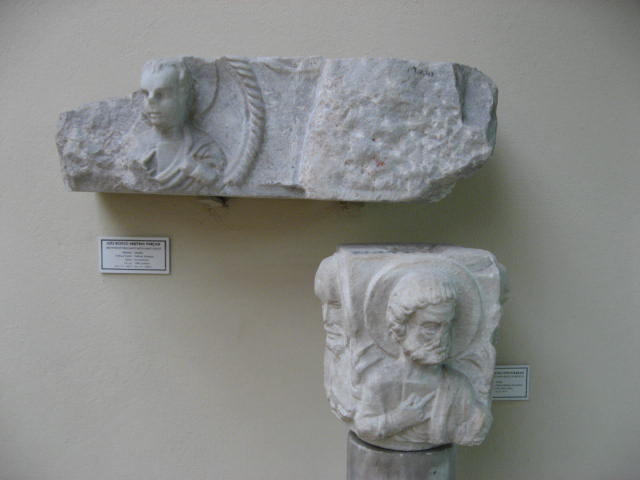
Fragments from the Church, kept at the Istanbul Archaeological Museums

Most scholars believe that the church was built between the eleventh and twelfth centuries. Many historians and archaeologists attribute the original structure to Michael VII Ducas (1071–1078); others put its foundation in the Comnenian period. Alternatively, the Swiss scholar and Byzantinist Ernest Mamboury suggested that the original building belonged to the 8th century.

The parekklesion (side chapel) was added to the south side of the church in the early Palaiologan period, and dedicated to Christos ho Logos (Greek: Christ the Word). Shortly after 1310, Martha Glabas erected a small shrine in memory of her late husband, the protostrator Michael Doukas Glabas Tarchaneiote, a general of Andronikos II Palaiologos. An elegant dedicatory inscription to Christ, written by the poet Manuel Philes, runs along the inside and outside of the parekklesion.

The main church was also renovated at the same time, as the study of the Templon has shown.

Following the conquest of Constantinople in 1453, the seat of the Greek Orthodox Patriarchate was first moved from Hagia Sophia to the Church of the Holy Apostles. Then in 1456 it was moved to the Theotokos Pammakaristos Church, where it remained until 1587. The synod of 1484, in which the council of Ferrara-Florence was condemned, took place in this church.

Five years later, the Ottoman Sultan Murad III converted the church into a mosque and renamed it in honor of his conquest (fetih) of Georgia and Azerbaijan, hence the name Fethiye Camii. To accommodate the requirements of prayer, most of the interior walls were removed to create a larger inner space.

After years of neglect, the complex was restored in 1949 by the Byzantine Institute of America and Dumbarton Oaks. While the main building remains a mosque, the parekklesion has been a museum since then.

In 2021 restoration work on the building began again. The mosque was opened for prayer in 2022, and the restoration was completed in 2024 with an official opening for visitors.

== Architecture and decoration ==
The Comnenian building was a church with a main aisle and two deambulatoria, three apses, and a narthex to the west. The masonry was typical of the Comnenian period, and used the recessed brick technique. In this technique, alternate courses of brick are mounted behind the line of the wall, and are plunged in a mortar's bed, which can still be seen in the cistern underneath and in the church. Its unusual plan in which the central space in enwrapped by the ambulatory stretching down both sides as well as the usual main exit/entrance west end, has been speculated by architectural historians such as Ousterhout to maximize the amount of burial space near the central space, the naos.

The transformation of the church into a mosque greatly changed the original building. The arcades connecting the main aisle with the deambulatoria were removed and replaced with broad arches to open up the nave. The three apses were removed too. In their place towards the east a great domed room was built at an oblique angle to the orientation of the building.

On the other side, the parekklesion represents what is sometimes considered the most beautiful building of the late Byzantine period in Constantinople. It has the typical cross-in-square plan with five domes, but the proportion between vertical and horizontal dimensions is much more attenuated than usual (although not so big as in the contemporary Byzantine churches built in the Balkans).

Although the inner colored marble revetment largely disappeared, the shrine still contains the restored remains of a number of mosaic panels, which, while not as varied and well-preserved as those of the Chora Church, serve as another resource for understanding late Byzantine art.

A representation of the Pantocrator, surrounded by the prophets of the Old Testament (Moses, Jeremiah, Zephaniah, Micah, Joel, Zechariah, Obadiah, Habakkuk, Jonah, Malachi, Ezekiel, and Isaiah) fills the main dome. In the apse, Christ Hyperagathos is shown with the Virgin Mary and St. John the Baptist. A Baptism of Christ survives intact to the right side of the dome.

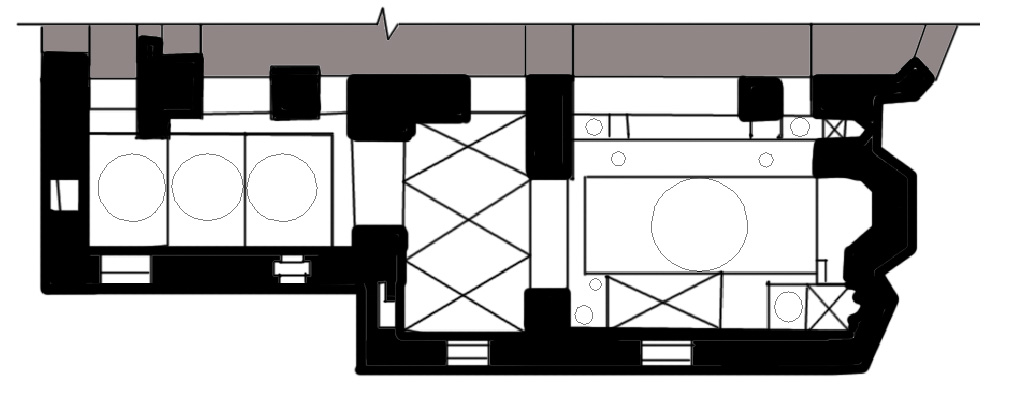
Pammakaristos Church plan.

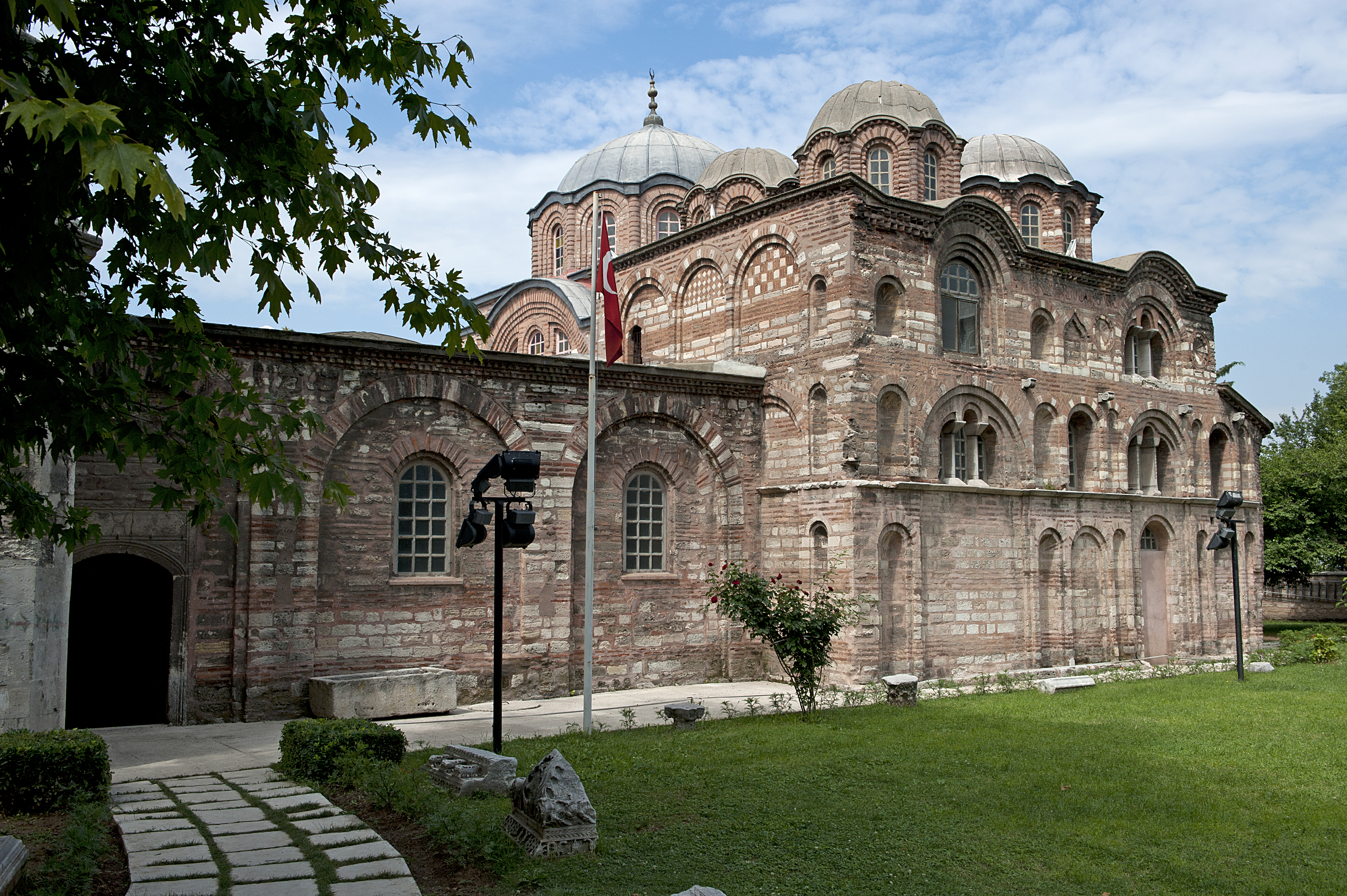
Fethiye Museum exterior

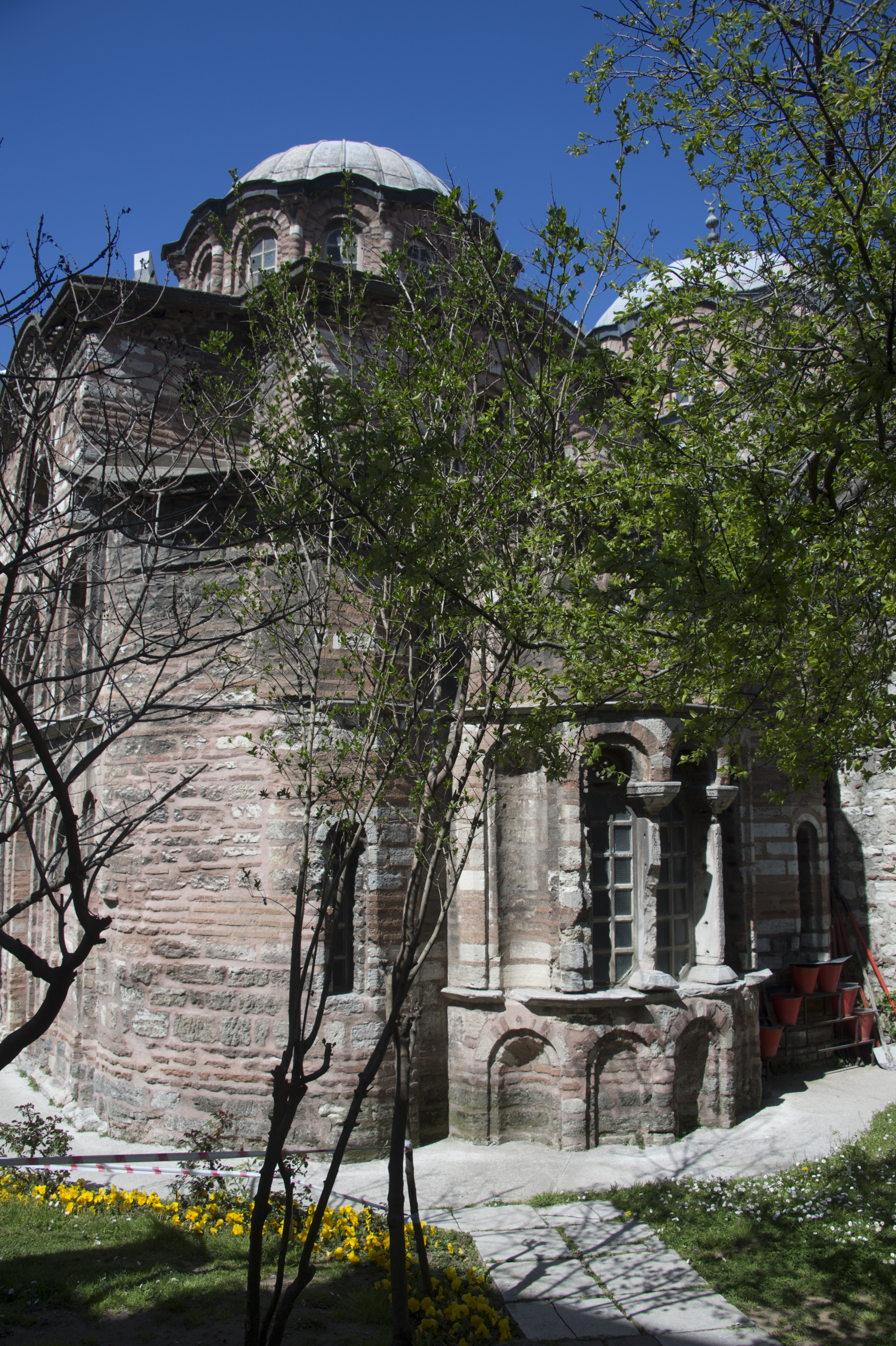
Fethiye Museum exterior

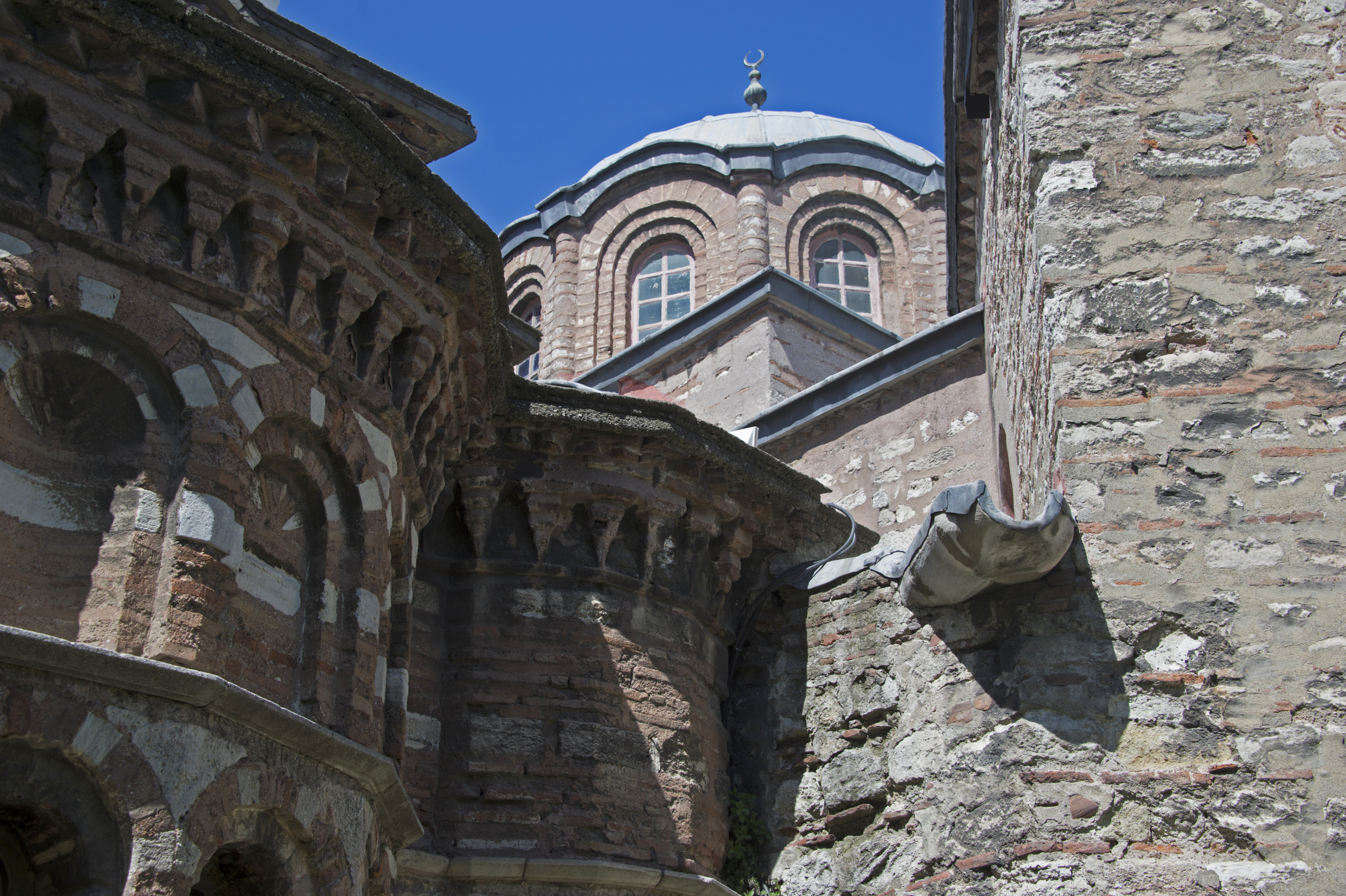
Fethiye Museum Exterior

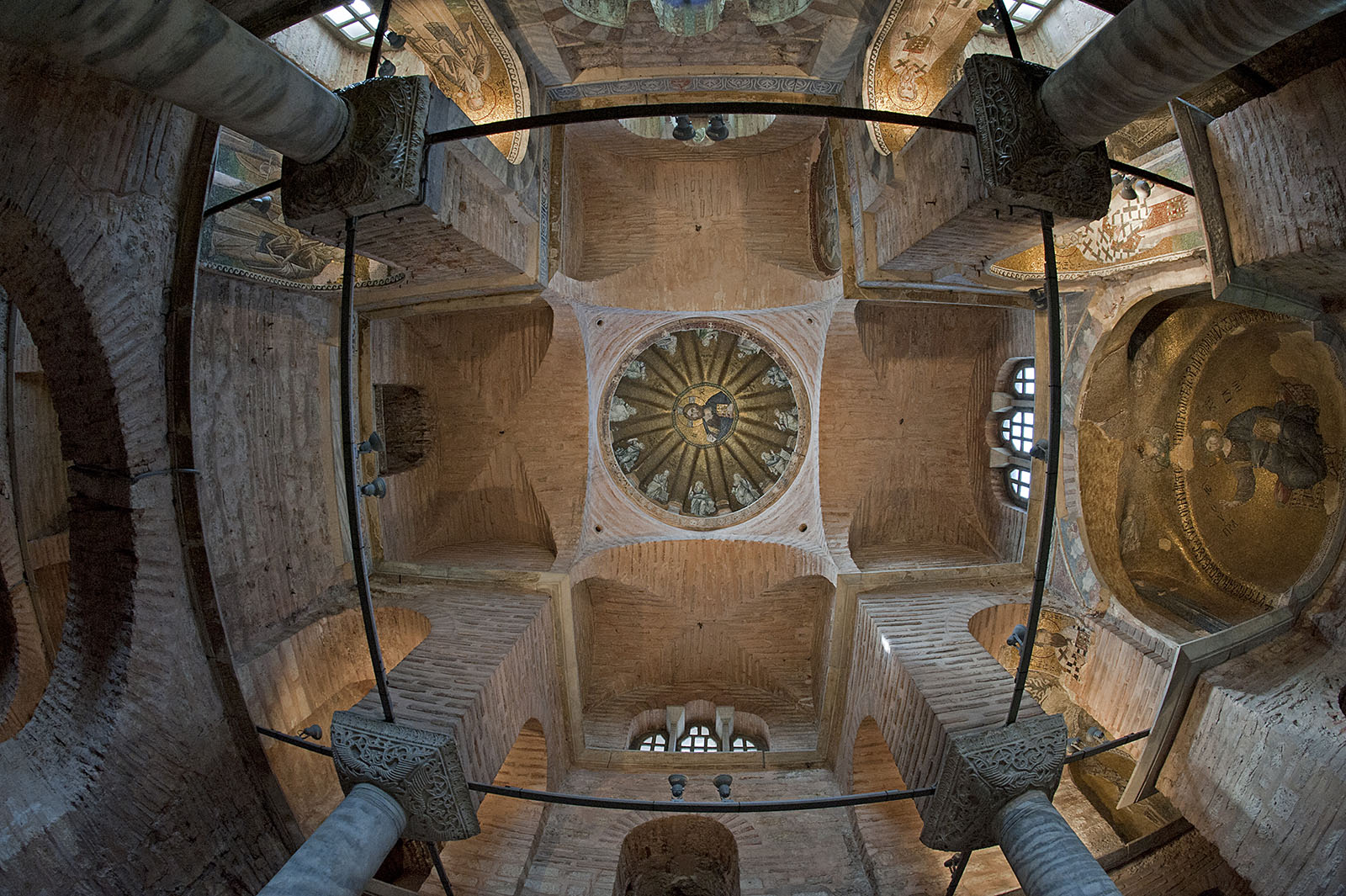
Fethiye Museum domes

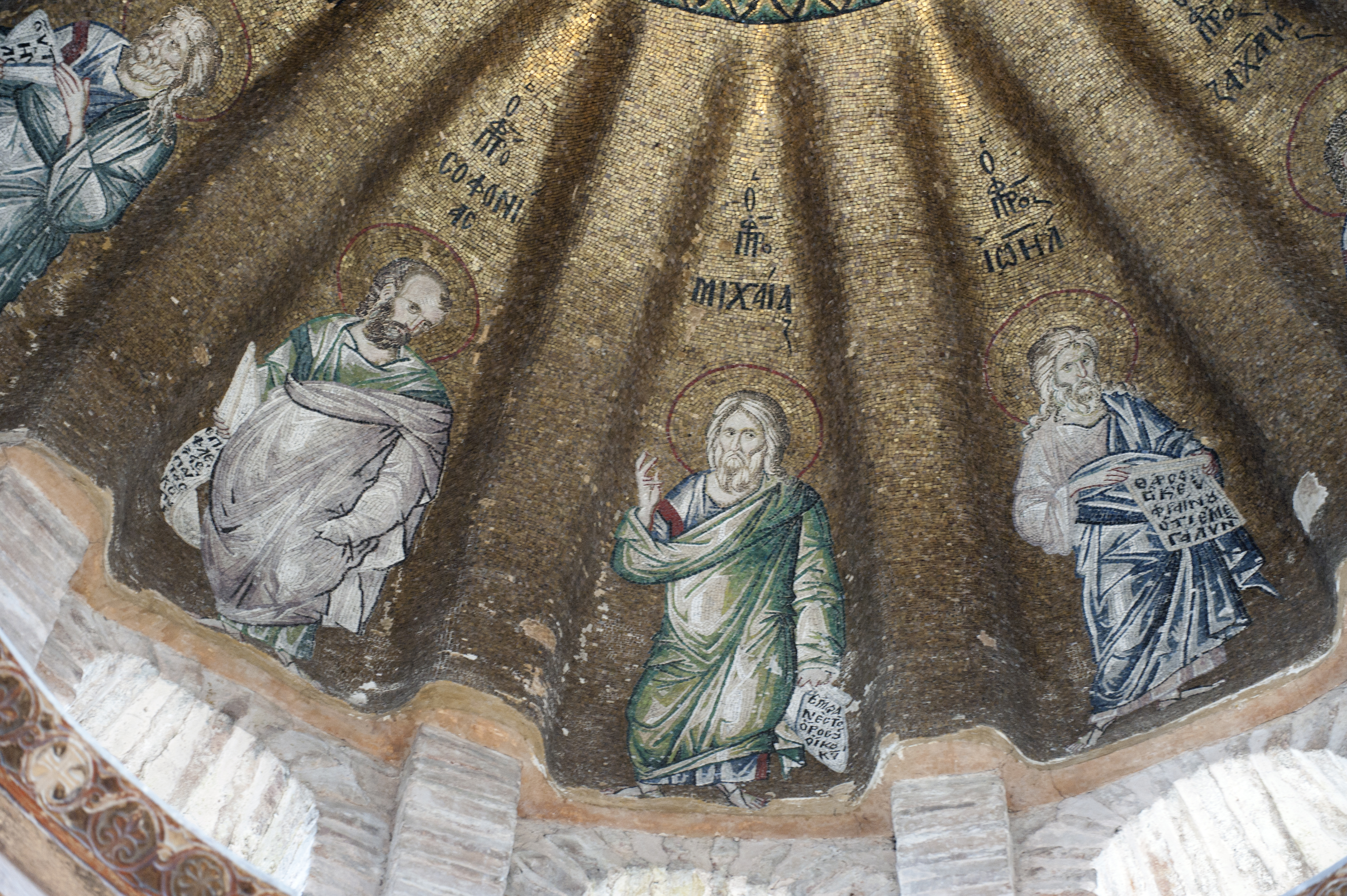
Fethiye Museum mosaic in a dome

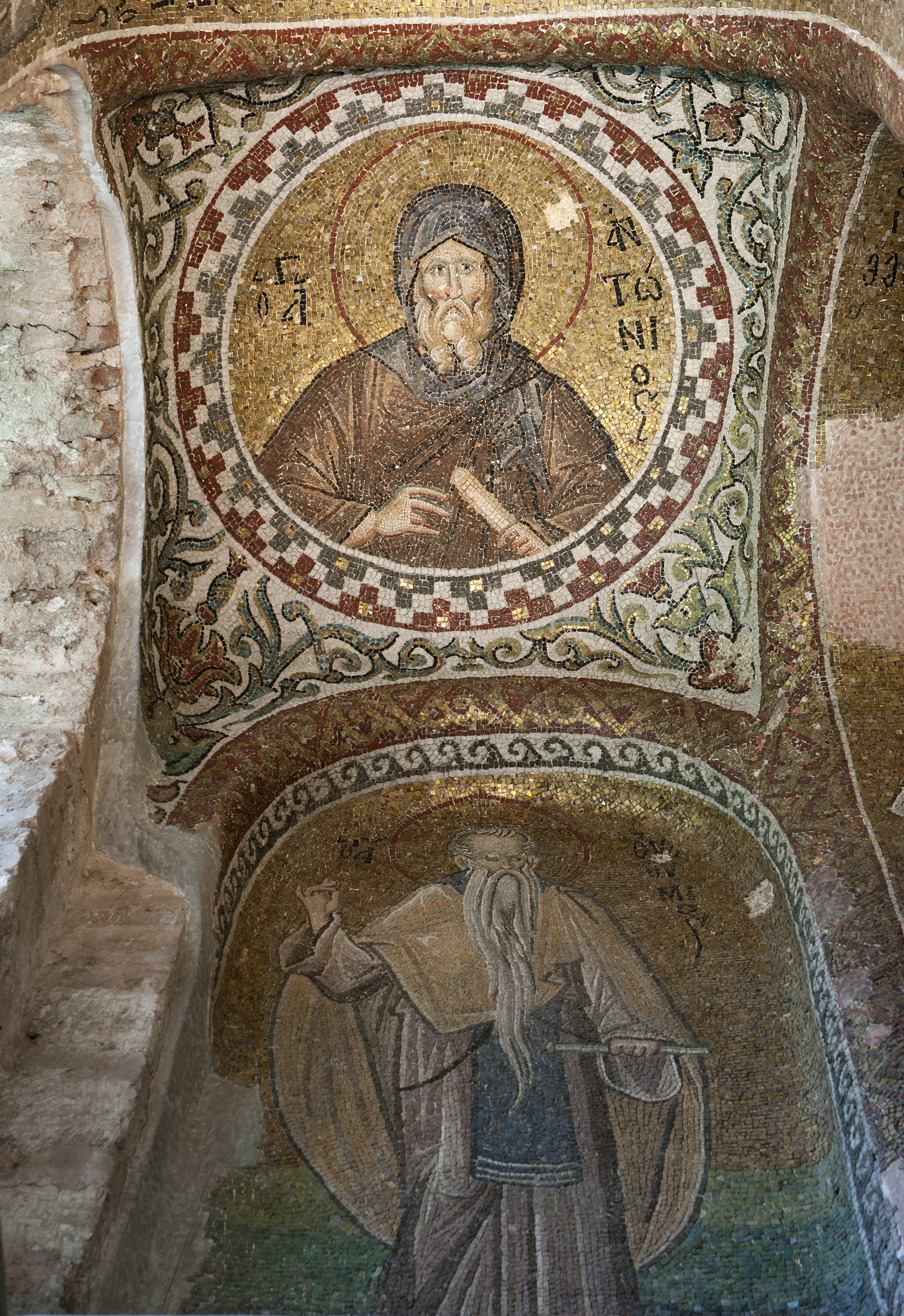
Fethiye Museum mosaic with Saint Antony, the desert Father

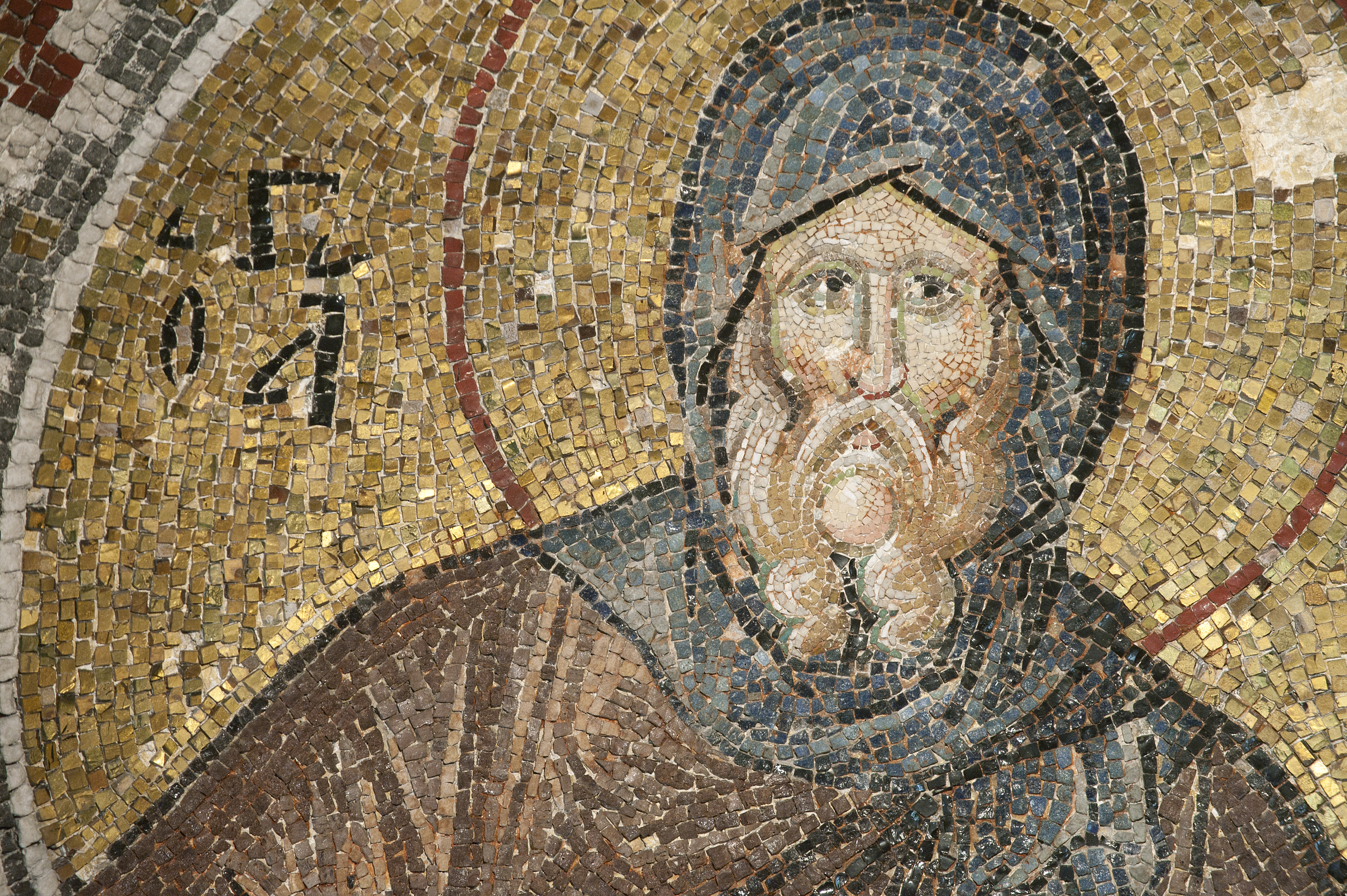
Fethiye Museum mosaic of Saint Antony, the desert Father

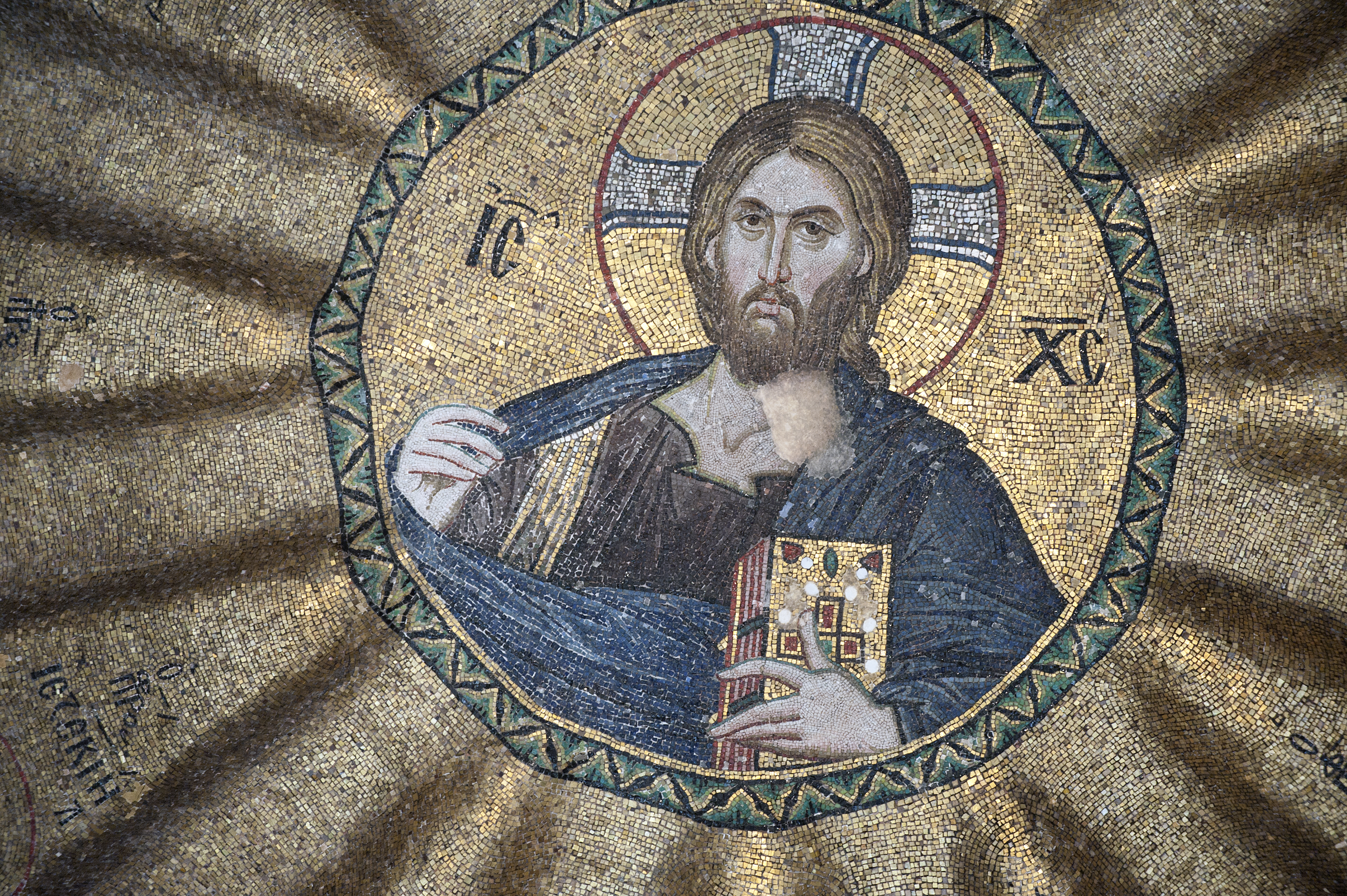
Fethiye Museum mosaic Christ

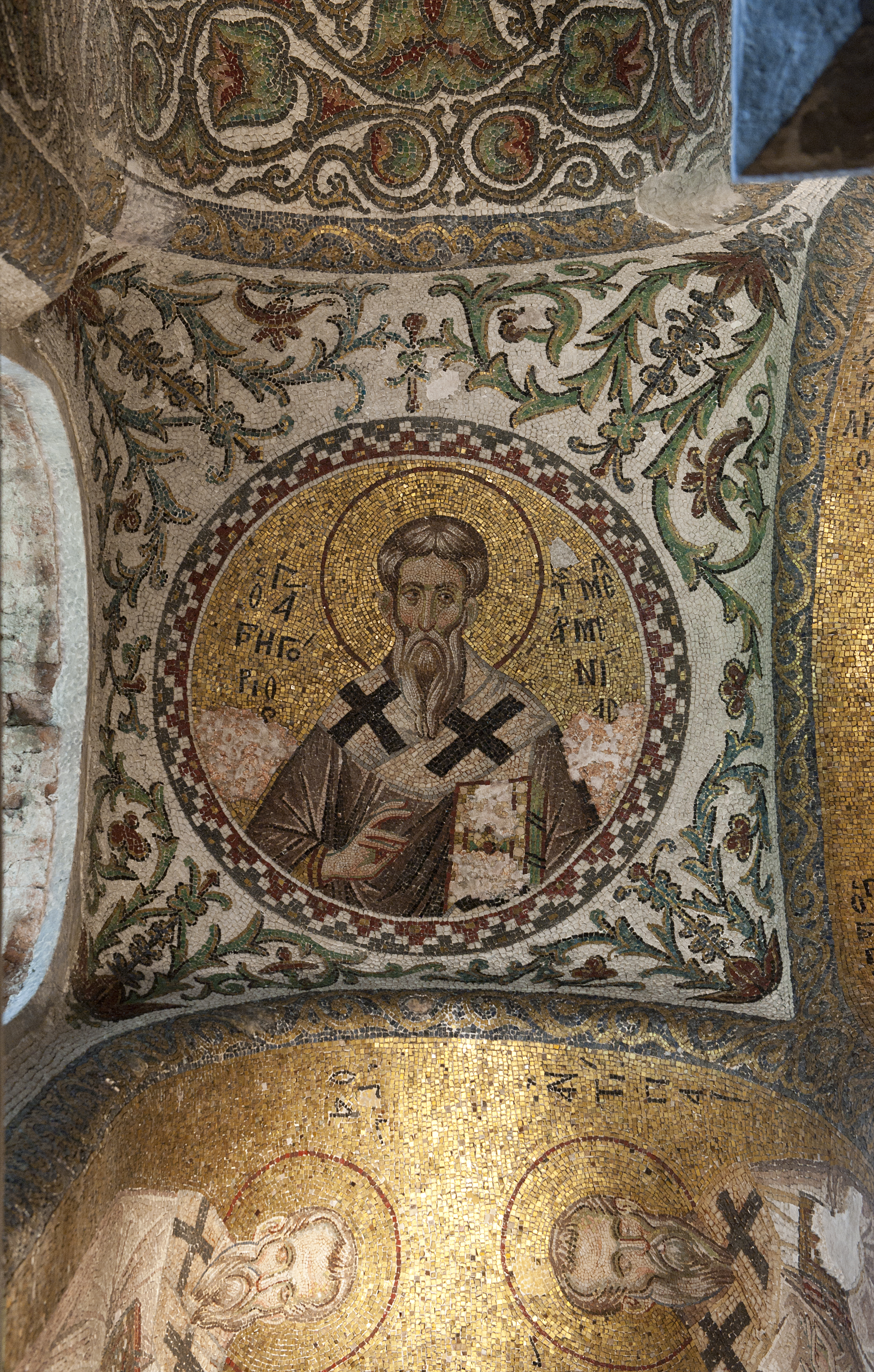
Fethiye Museum mosaic Saint Gregory of Great Armenia

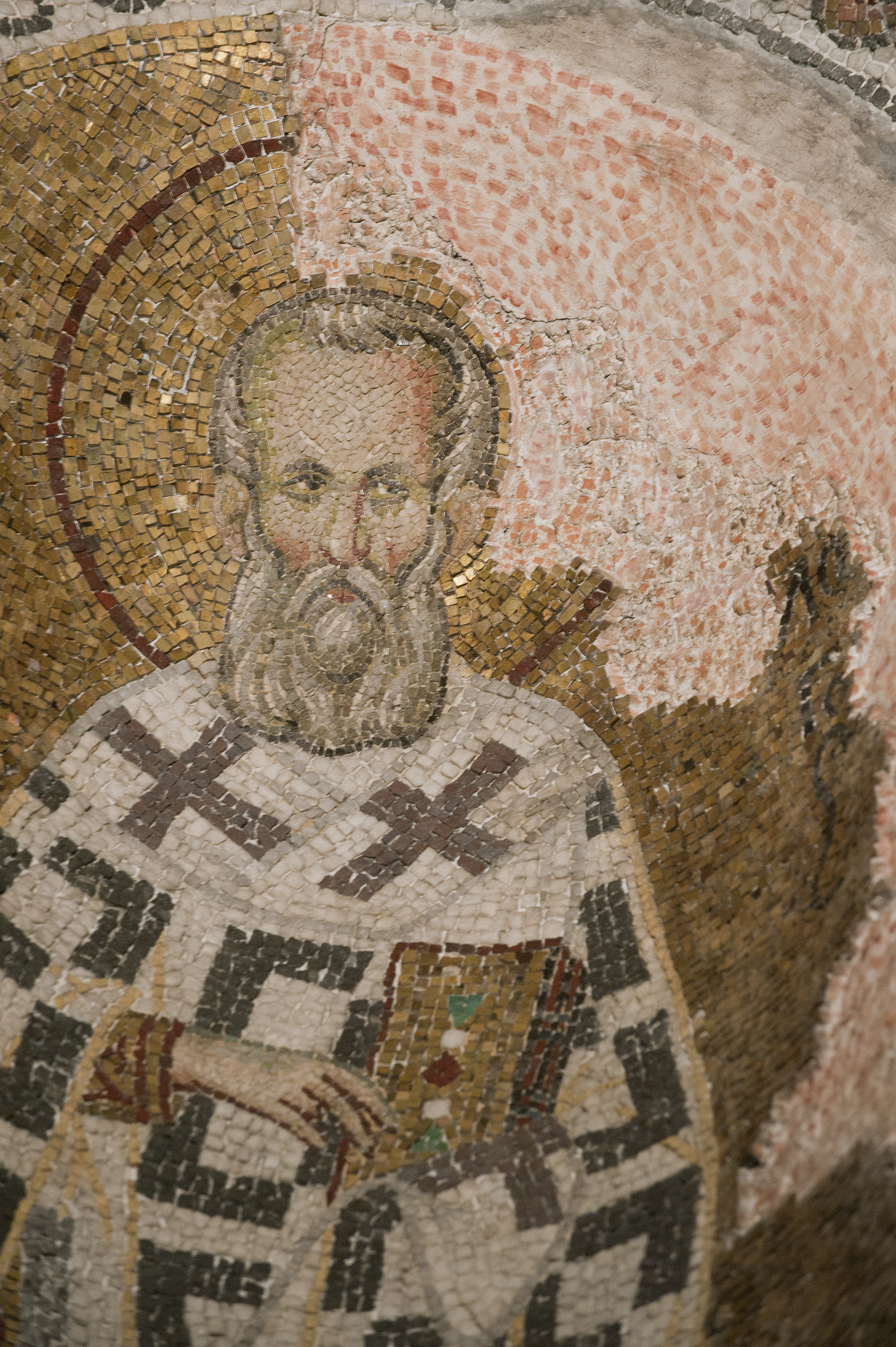
Fethiye Museum mosaic

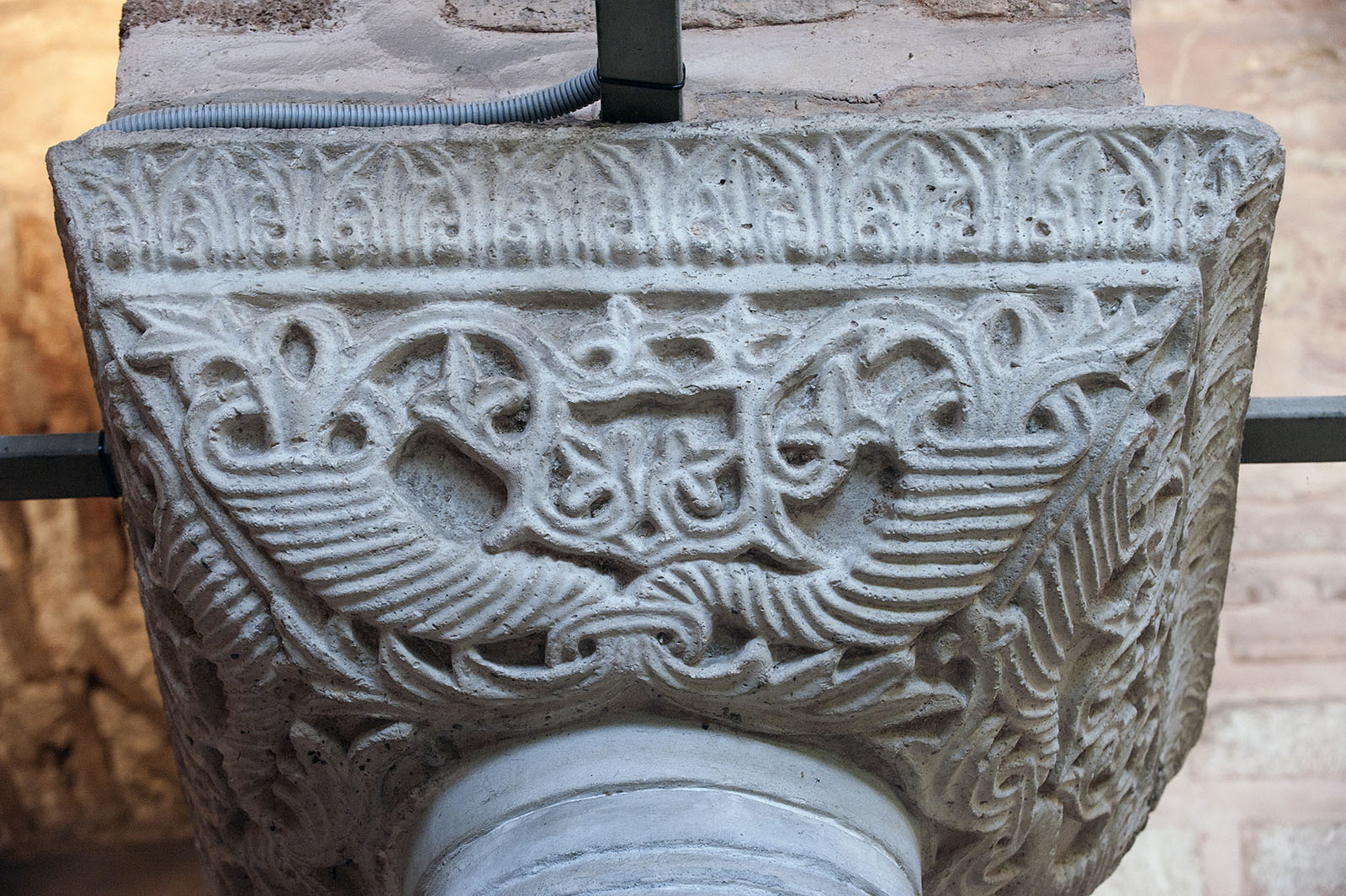
Fethiye Museum capital

In the building with the Fethiye Museum (with an entrance in the street passing the garden where the entrance to the museum is) a part is still a mosque. Here are some pictures of its interior

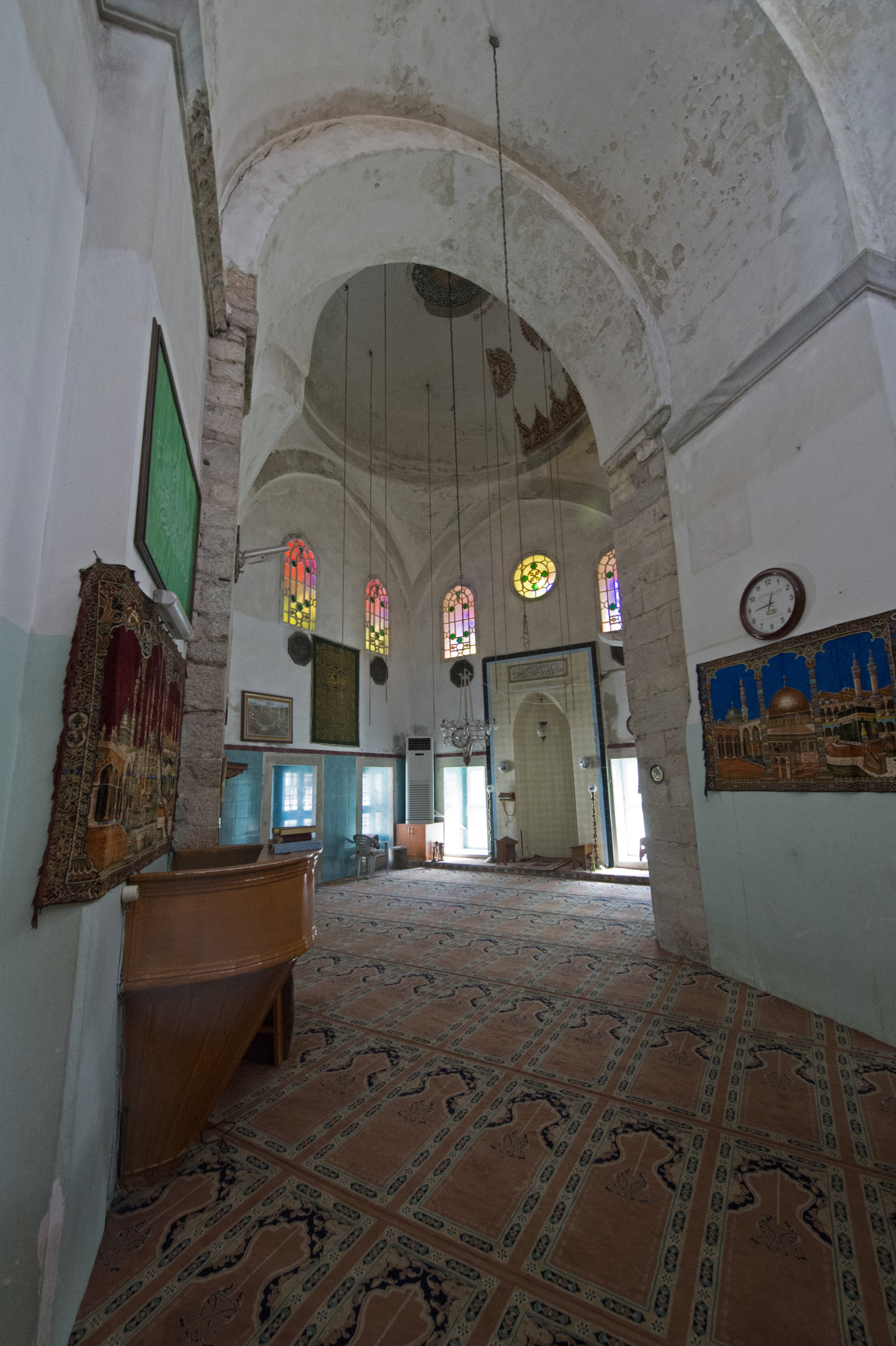
Fethiye Mosque interior

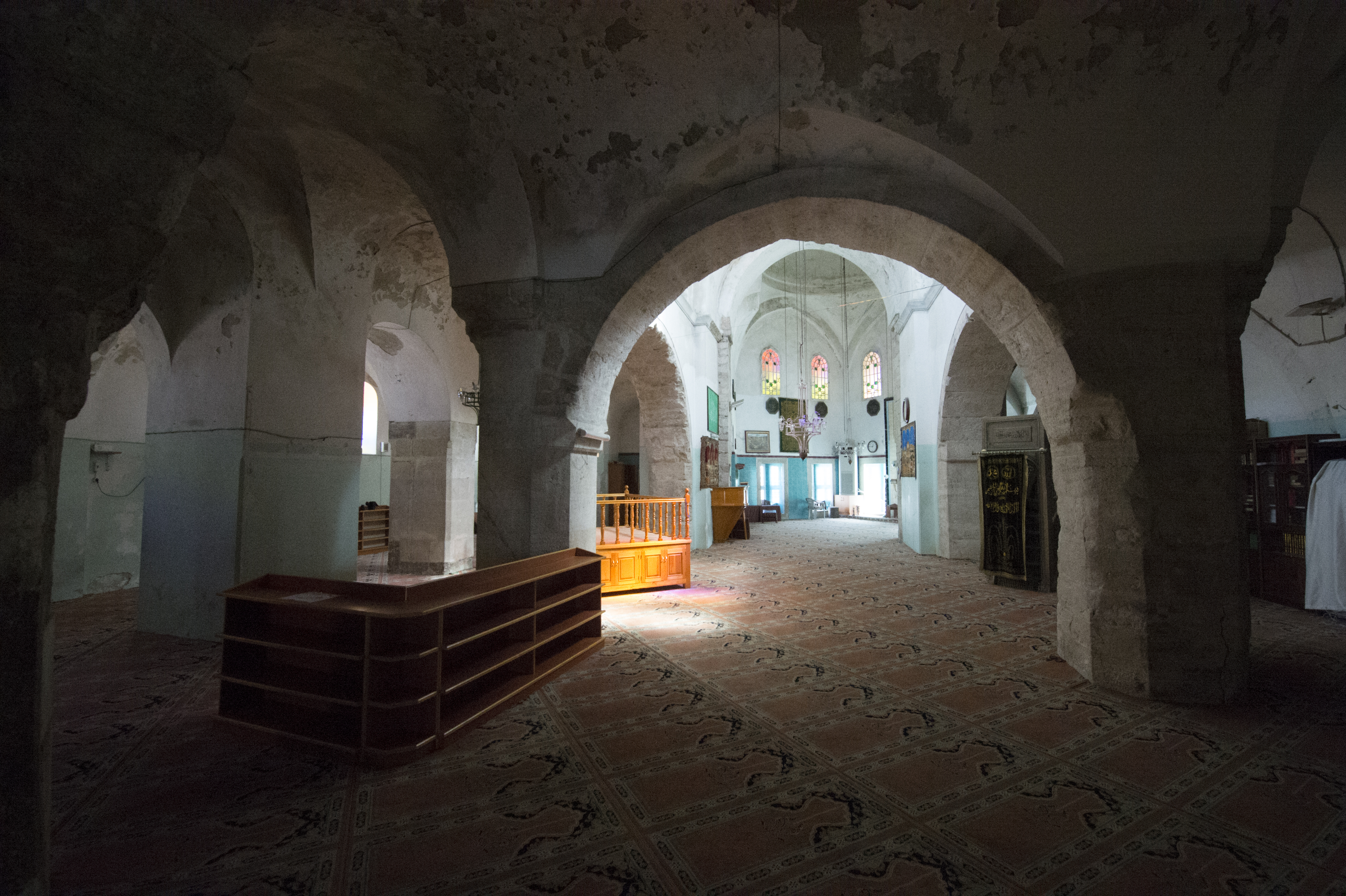
Fethiye Mosque interior

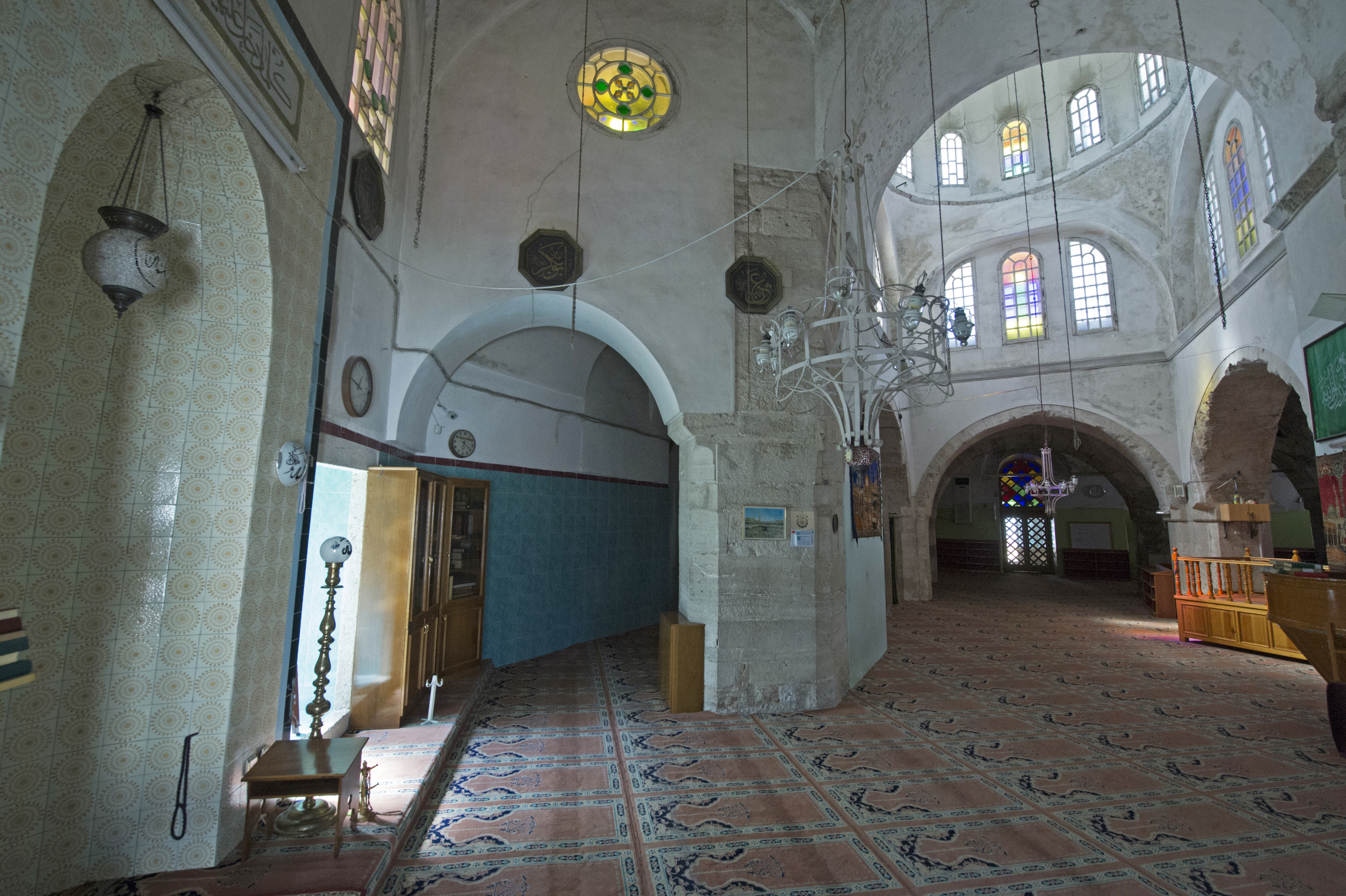
Fethiye Mosque interior

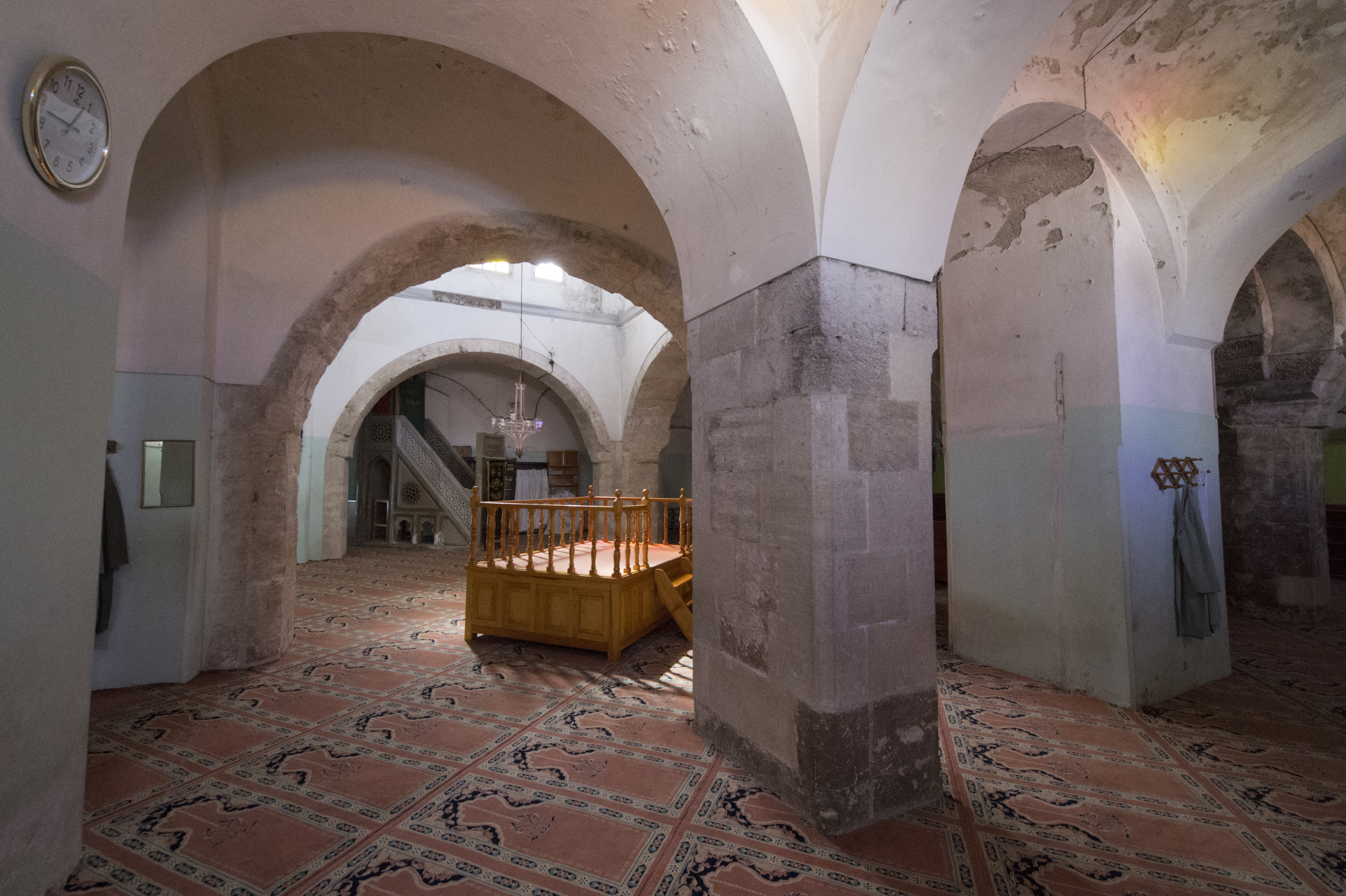
Fethiye Mosque interior

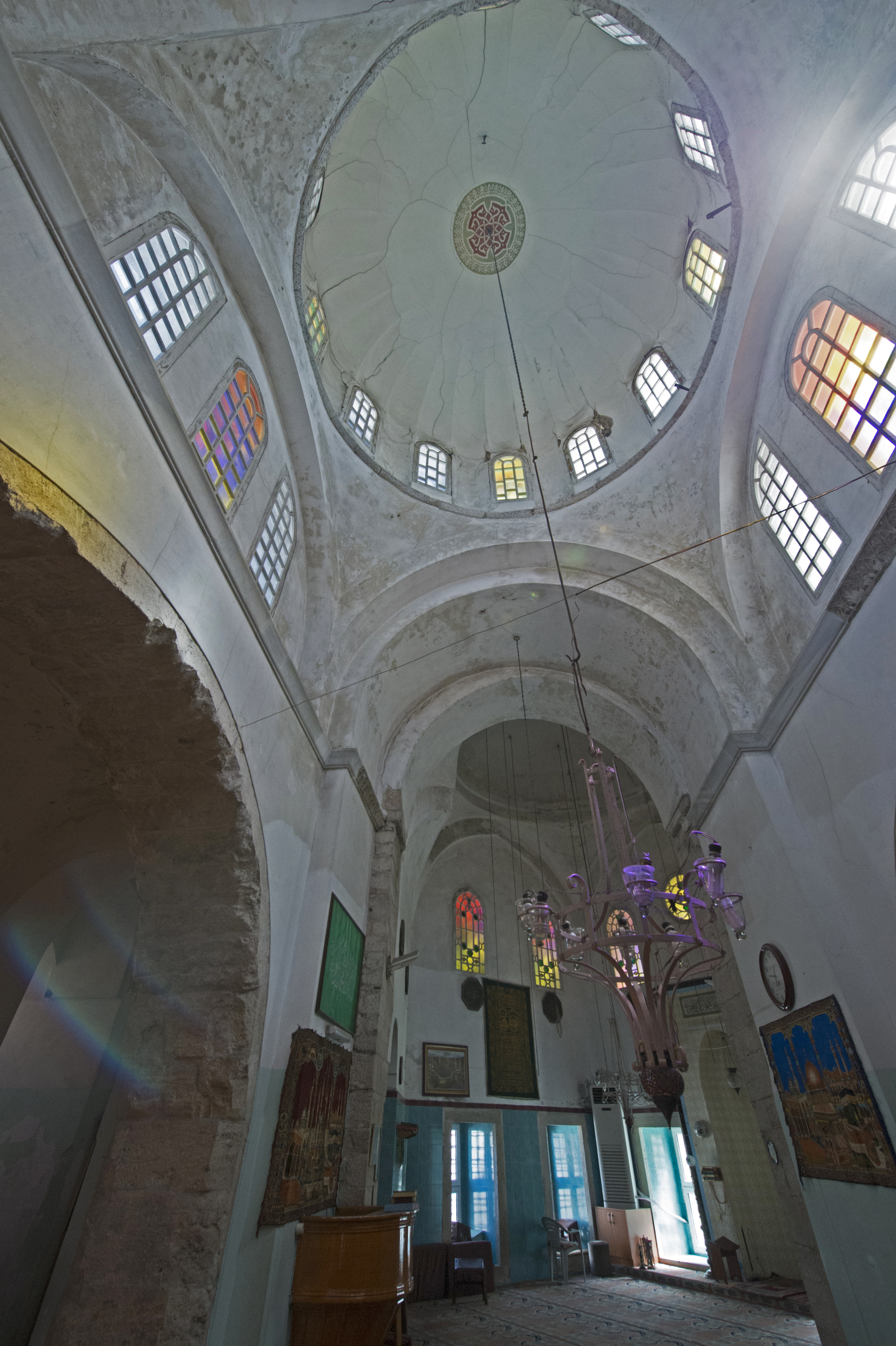
Fethiye Mosque interior

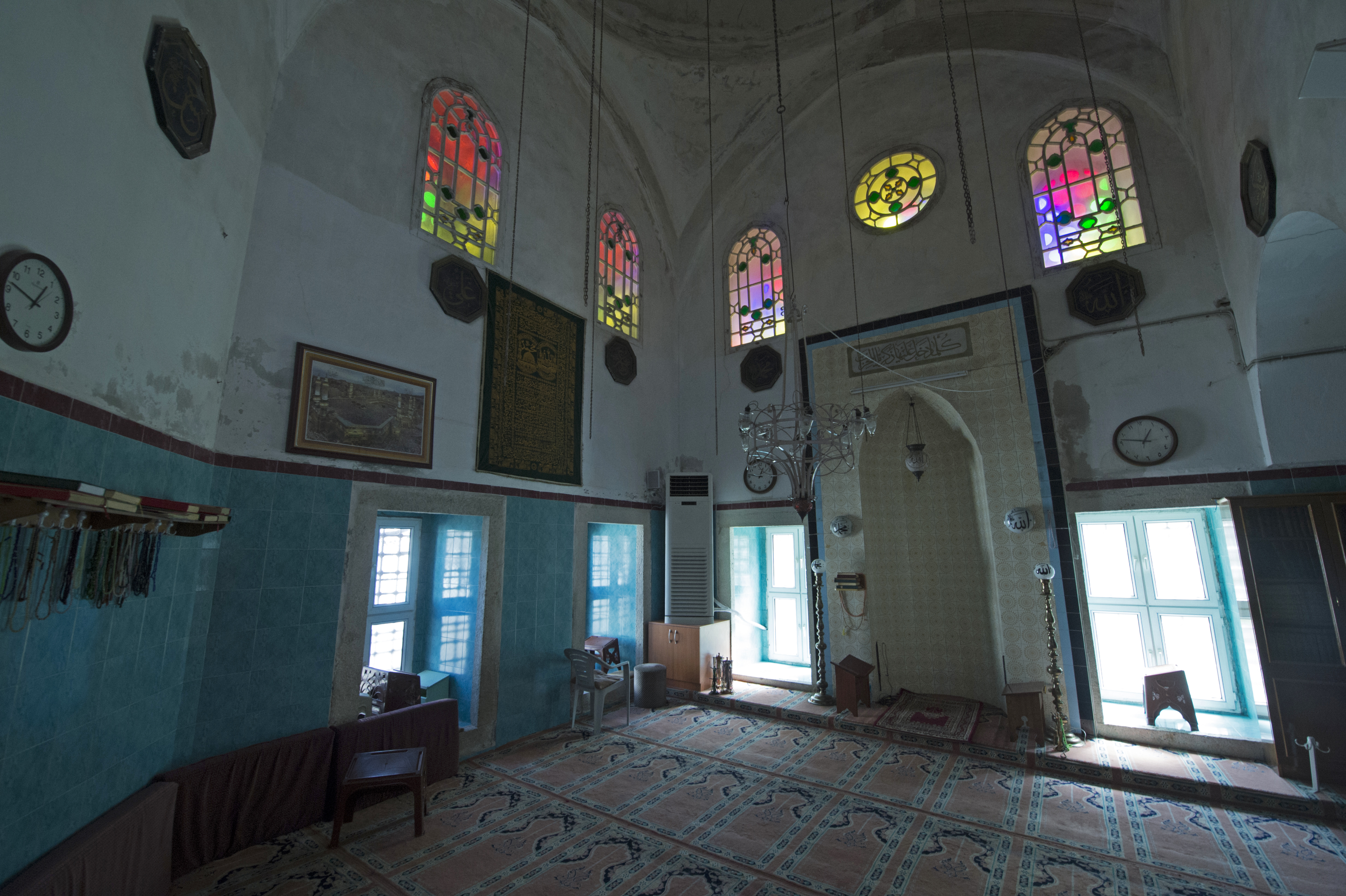
Fethiye Mosque interior

== See also ==
- Ancient Roman and Byzantine domes
