= Pseudo-Dorotheos of Monemvasia =

Pseudo-Dorotheos of Monemvasia (Greek: Δωρόθεος Μονεμβασίας) is the name given to the unknown author (or compiler) of a Greek-language chronicle titled Historical Book (Βιβλίον Ιστορικόν), published at Venice in 1631. The work contains a history of the world from Creation until the early 17th century, and purports to have been written by a non-existent metropolitan of Monemvasia named Dorotheos. The book became a popular source of historical knowledge during the period of Ottoman rule in Greece.
