= Raphael I of Constantinople =

Ecumenical Patriarch of Constantinople from 1475 to 1476

- Ecumenical Patriarch of Constantinople
- Church: Church of Constantinople
- In office: Early 1475 – early 1476
- Predecessor: Symeon I of Constantinople
- Successor: Maximus III of Constantinople

Personal details
- Died: 1476
- Denomination: Eastern Orthodoxy

Raphael I of Constantinople (Greek: Ραφαήλ, Rafail; Serbian: Рафаило I / Rafailo I; died 1476) was Ecumenical Patriarch of Constantinople from 1475 to 1476.

== Life ==
Raphael was a Serbian monk. He probably was chosen and supported as Patriarch by Mara Branković, the stepmother of Mehmed II. Raphael was successfully appointed Patriarch in the first months of 1475, promising the Sultan a yearly payment of 2000 gold florins and a one-time gift of 700 gold florins.

The Greek community of Constantinople had not part in his appointment and fiercely opposed him. The Metropolitan of Heraclea, who traditionally enthroned the new patriarch, refused to consecrate him, and the liturgy was celebrated by the Metropolitan of Ancyra. For this reason he was not recognized as Patriarch by a large part of the Greek clergy.

In September 1475, he appointed Spyridon of Tver as new Eastern Orthodox Metropolis of Kiev and all Rus'.

The sources show an extended bias against Raphael I. He is accused of not speaking properly Greek and is denounced for his foreign accent and for his addiction to alcohol. It is reported that he was not able to stand during the ceremonies of the Great Friday because he was drunk.

Raphael I reigned for about one year, until early 1476: at the beginning of the year, when he had to pay the annual gift he had promised to the Sultan, he tried to collect it from his faithful, who denied their help. Unable to pay the requested fee, he was immediately deposed and imprisoned. He died shortly after still in chains.

== Bibliography ==
- Јањић, Драгана Ј.; Ђокић, Небојша Д. (2015). "Рафаило I једини Србин васељенски патријарх". Баштина. 39: 87–109.
- Kiminas, Demetrius (2009). The Ecumenical Patriarchate - A History of Its Metropolitanates with Annotated Hierarch Catalogs. Wildside Press.
- Laurent, Vitalien (1968). "Les premiers patriarches de Constantinople sous la domination turque (1454–1476) - Succession et chronologie d'après un catalogue inédit". Revue des études byzantines. 26: 229–263. doi:10.3406/rebyz.1968.1407.
- Philippides, Marios; Hanak, Walter K. (2011). The Siege and the Fall of Constantinople in 1453 - Historiography, Topography and Military Studies. Ashgate Publishing.
- Romanchuk, Robert (2003). "Once again on the Greek workbook of Timofei Veniaminov, fifteenth-century Novgorod monk". Monastic traditions - Selected proceedings of the Fourth International Hilandar Conference. Bloomington: Slavica. pp. 263–304.
- Runciman, Steven (1985) [1968]. The Great Church in Captivity - A Study of the Patriarchate of Constantinople from the Eve of the Turkish Conquest to the Greek War of Independence (2nd ed.). Cambridge University Press.

Eastern Orthodox Church titles
Preceded by Symeon I	Ecumenical Patriarch of Constantinople; 1475 – 1476	Succeeded by Maximus III
