= Chartophylax =

Byzantine Christian record keeper role

A chartophylax (Greek: χαρτοφύλαξ, from χάρτα, "document" and φύλαξ, "guard, keeper"), sometimes also referred to as a chartoularios, was an ecclesiastical officer in charge of official documents and records in the Greek Orthodox Church in Byzantine times.

The post existed in Constantinople as well as the provincial dioceses, and holders of the post were responsible for the archives and chancery. Some monasteries also included a chartophylax or, for the women's convents, a chartophylakissa, in charge of their records. Gradually, by virtue of his office's importance, the chartophylax of the Patriarch of Constantinople rose to become one of the most important officials in the clergy, despite his nominally low rank. Codinus calls the Grand Chartophylax the judge of all causes, and the patriarch's right arm. He adds that this officer was the depository or keeper of all the charters relating to the ecclesiastical rights stored in the chartophylakeion (Archives). In addition, the chartophylax presided over matrimonial causes, and was the main intermediary between the clergy and the patriarch, controlling his correspondence and access to him. He drew up all sentences and decisions of the patriarch, who signed and sealed them; he presided in the synods in the patriarch's absence and took cognizance of all ecclesiastical and civil matters and causes, whether among the clergy, the monks, or the people. The chartophylax took precedence over all the bishops, though he was only a deacon. On occasion, he discharged the functions of the priests: he had twelve notaries under him. The chartophylax of Constantinople was analogous to the chartulary of the See of Rome, but far more powerful.
