= George Galesiotes =

George Galesiotes (Greek: Γεώργιος Γαλησιώτης, c. 1275/1280−1357) was a high-ranking Byzantine official of the Patriarchate of Constantinople who studied under the tutelage of Manuel Holobolos. Upon becoming an official of the Patriarchate, Galesiotes was in charge of the sakellion of the Church from around 1330 and 1346. Along with being a Church official, Galesiotes also became an author of speeches and other works.

== Sources ==
- Davis, John (2010). "Anna Komnene and Niketas Choniates 'translated': the fourteenth century Byzantine metaphrases". In Macrides, Ruth (ed.). History As Literature in Byzantium: Papers from the Fortieth Spring Symposium of Byzantine Studies, University of Birmingham, April 2007. Burlington, VT: Ashgate Publishing Company. pp. 55–72. ISBN 978-1-40-941206-9.
- Fryde, Edmund B. (2000). The Early Palaeologan Renaissance (1261−c. 1360). Leiden: Brill. ISBN 978-9-00-411714-3.
- Kazhdan, Aleksandr Petrovich (1993). Authors and Texts in Byzantium. Aldershot, Hampshire: Variorum. ISBN 978-0-86-078362-6.
