= Benizelos family =

The Benizelos family (Greek: Μπενιζέλοι) was a Greek aristocratic family from Athens. The family was mentioned in the Venetian sources as among the oldest, richest and most powerful families in Athens during the Ottoman era. Descendants of the family distinguished themselves throughout the period of Ottoman rule as elders (proestoi), notaries and men of letters, teachers and also, played a significant role in the Greek War of Independence of 1821.

== History ==
Tradition connects the Benizeloi with the noble Acciaioli family, the Florentine Dukes of the Duchy of Athens; but the initial documentary mention of any family member, the foremost of the 12 chief aristocratic families, appears in late-15th century Athens with Angelos Benizelos, the father of Saint Philothei. Angelos also actively participated in the administration of the Greek community of Venice, occupying various offices and teaching at the Scuola dei Greci. The family is commemorated along with another Athenian aristocratic family, the Chalkokondyles family in the Kaisariani Monastery where they sponsored the frescoes.

== Benizelos mansion ==
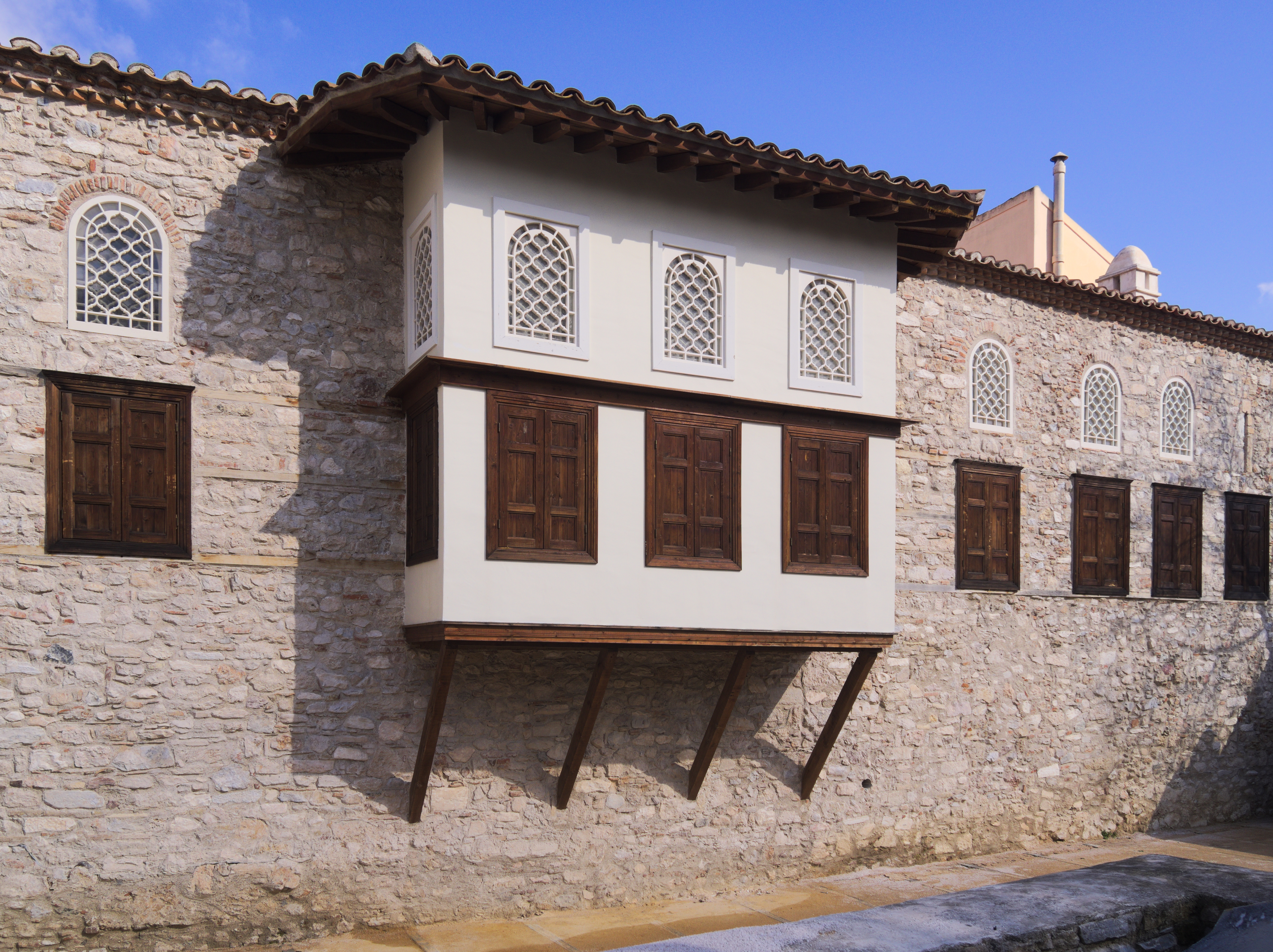
The window at the south facade of Benizelos mansion.

The mansion of the Benizelos family is located at the historic quarter of Plaka in Athens and it is a typical example of Ottoman urban architecture, one of the few surviving in Greece. It was constructed most likely at the first-half of the 18th century. It currently serves as a museum.

== Notable members ==
- Saint Philothei, daughter of Angelos Benizelos and Syrigi Palaiologina, born (c. 1522) as Revoula Benizelou, was a Greek Orthodox religious sister, martyr and saint from Ottoman-era Greece.
- Ioannis Benizelos (c. 1625) was a teacher at the Hellenomouseion or Common School of Athens (documented for the years 1676 – 1677).
- Ioannis Benizelos (c. 1735 – 1807), author of the History of Athens, was a distinguished member of Athenian society during the 18th century. He studied at the Common School of Athens, married Maria, daughter of Dimitrios Kalogeras (who was also from a noble family of the city and was an elder), and taught at the Deka School from 1774 until nearly the end of his life. He earned the respect of his fellow-citizens, made official speeches in Athens and came in contact with foreign visitors such as the French nobleman Montmorency (1788) and the English traveler and author John Hawkins, whom he hosted in his house for forty days (1796). His work narrates eyewitness accounts of the events of his home town, particularly the era of Hadji Ali Haseki.
- Ioannis Gennadios (c. 1844 – 1932), diplomat, bibliophile and author, was a descendant of the family on his mother’s side (great-grandchild of Ioannis Benizelos, c. 1735 – 1807). His personal library formed the core of the Gennadius Library of Athens. Gennadios was Greek ambassador to London, and among other works wrote an extensive study of the Benizelos family and of Saint Philothei.

== Sources ==
- Alexandrou, Eleni (2015). "Thermal behavior of historic and traditional Post Byzantine buildings in Greece". Biocultural 2015 Sustainability in Architectural Cultural Heritage.
- Miller, William (1922). "Ἀθηναϊκον Ἀρχοντολόγιον. Α′. Οἱ ἄρχοντες Μπενιζέλοι. By D. G. Kampouroglos. Athens: Sidéres, 1921". The Journal of Hellenic Studies. 42 (1). Cambridge University Press (CUP): 127–128. doi:10.2307/625955. ISSN 0075-4269. JSTOR 625955.
- Miller, William (1932). "The 'Gennadeion': Dr. Gennadius' Monument at Athens". The Journal of Hellenic Studies. 52 (2). Cambridge University Press (CUP): 297–302. doi:10.2307/625995. ISSN 0075-4269. JSTOR 625995.
- Vryonis, Speros (2002). "The Ghost of Athens in Byzantine and Ottoman Times". Balkan Studies. 43 (1): 5–115.
