= Patriarch Gabriel of Constantinople =

Patriarch Gabriel of Constantinople may refer to:

- Gabriel I of Constantinople, Ecumenical Patriarch in 1596
- Gabriel II of Constantinople, Ecumenical Patriarch in 1657
- Gabriel III of Constantinople, Ecumenical Patriarch in 1702–1707
