= Patriarch Meletius I =

Patriarch Meletius I may refer to:

- Meletius of Antioch, Patriarch in 361–381
- Meletius I of Constantinople, Greek Patriarch of Alexandria in 1590–1601 and Ecumenical Patriarch of Constantinople in 1597-1598
