= Patriarch Matthew of Constantinople =

Patriarch Matthew of Constantinople may refer to:

- Matthew I of Constantinople, Ecumenical Patriarch in 1397–1410
- Matthew II of Constantinople, Ecumenical Patriarch in 1596, 1598–1602 and 1603
