= Patriarch Raphael =

Patriarch Raphael may refer to:

- Patriarch Raphael I of Constantinople, Ecumenical Patriarch of Constantinople in 1475–1476
- Raphael II of Constantinople, Ecumenical Patriarch of Constantinople in 1603–1607
- Raphael I Bidawid, patriarch of the Chaldean Catholic Church in 1989–2003
