= Gabriel I =

Gabriel I may refer to:

- Pope Gabriel I of Alexandria, Coptic patriarch from 910 to 920
- Gabriel I of Serbia (died 1659), Serbian Archbishop from 1648 to 1655
- Gabriel I of Constantinople (died 1596), Ecumenical Patriarch from March to August 1596
- Gabriel Bethlen (1580–1629), King of Hungary
