= Patriarch Meletius of Alexandria =

Patriarch Meletius of Alexandria may refer to:

- Patriarch Meletius I of Alexandria, ruled in 1590–1601
- Patriarch Meletius II of Alexandria, ruled in 1926–1935
