= Theophanes I of Constantinople =

Ecumenical Patriarch of Constantinople from 1596 to 1597

- Ecumenical Patriarch of Constantinople
- Church: Church of Constantinople
- In office: August 1596 – February 1597
- Predecessor: Gabriel I of Constantinople
- Successor: Meletius I of Constantinople

Personal details
- Died: 26 March 1597
- Denomination: Eastern Orthodoxy

Theophanes I of Constantinople (Greek: Θεοφάνης; died 26 March 1597) was Ecumenical Patriarch of Constantinople from August 1596 to February 1597. He died only three weeks after leaving office. He was previously the metropolitan of Philippopolis, a protopsaltes and composer of hymns.

== Bibliography ==
- Venance Grumel, Traité d'études byzantines, vol. I - La chronologie, Presses universitaires de France, Paris, 1958, p. 438.
- Nicolas Viton de Saint-Allais, L'art de vérifier les dates, tome I, Paris, 1818, p. 494.

Eastern Orthodox Church titles
Preceded by Gabriel I	Ecumenical Patriarch of Constantinople; 1596 – 1597	Succeeded by Meletius I
