= Plaka =

Plaka Πλάκα
- Neighborhood
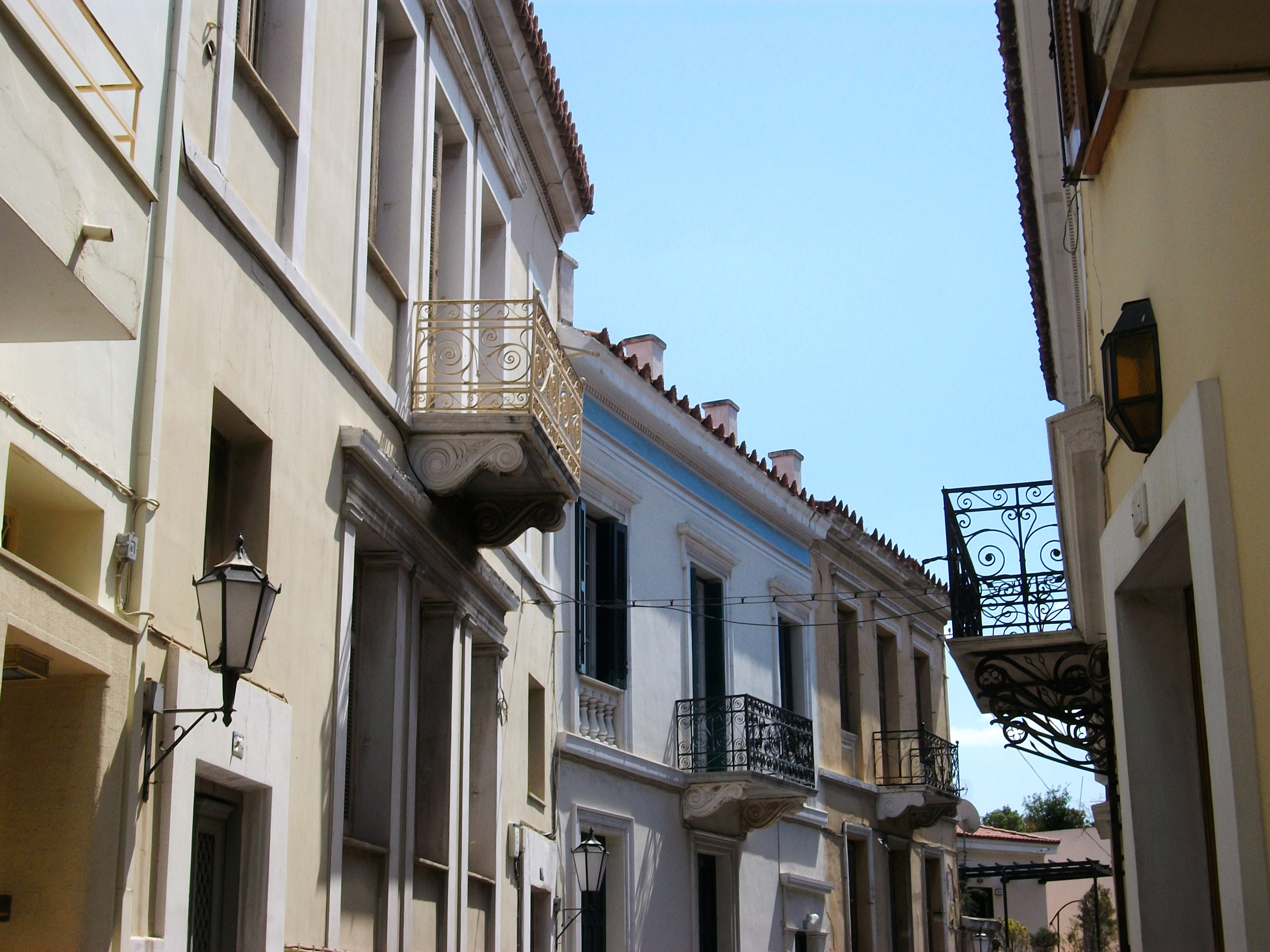
- Typical houses of Plaka

- Location within Athens
- Coordinates: 37°58′20″N 23°43′50″E
- Country: Greece
- Region: Attica
- City: Athens
- Website: www.cityofathens.gr

Pláka (Greek: Πλάκα) is the old historical neighborhood of Athens, clustered around the northern and eastern slopes of the Acropolis, and incorporating labyrinthine streets and neoclassical architecture. Plaka is built on top of the residential areas of the ancient town of Athens. It is known as the "Neighborhood of the Gods" due to its proximity to the Acropolis and its many archaeological sites.

== Name ==
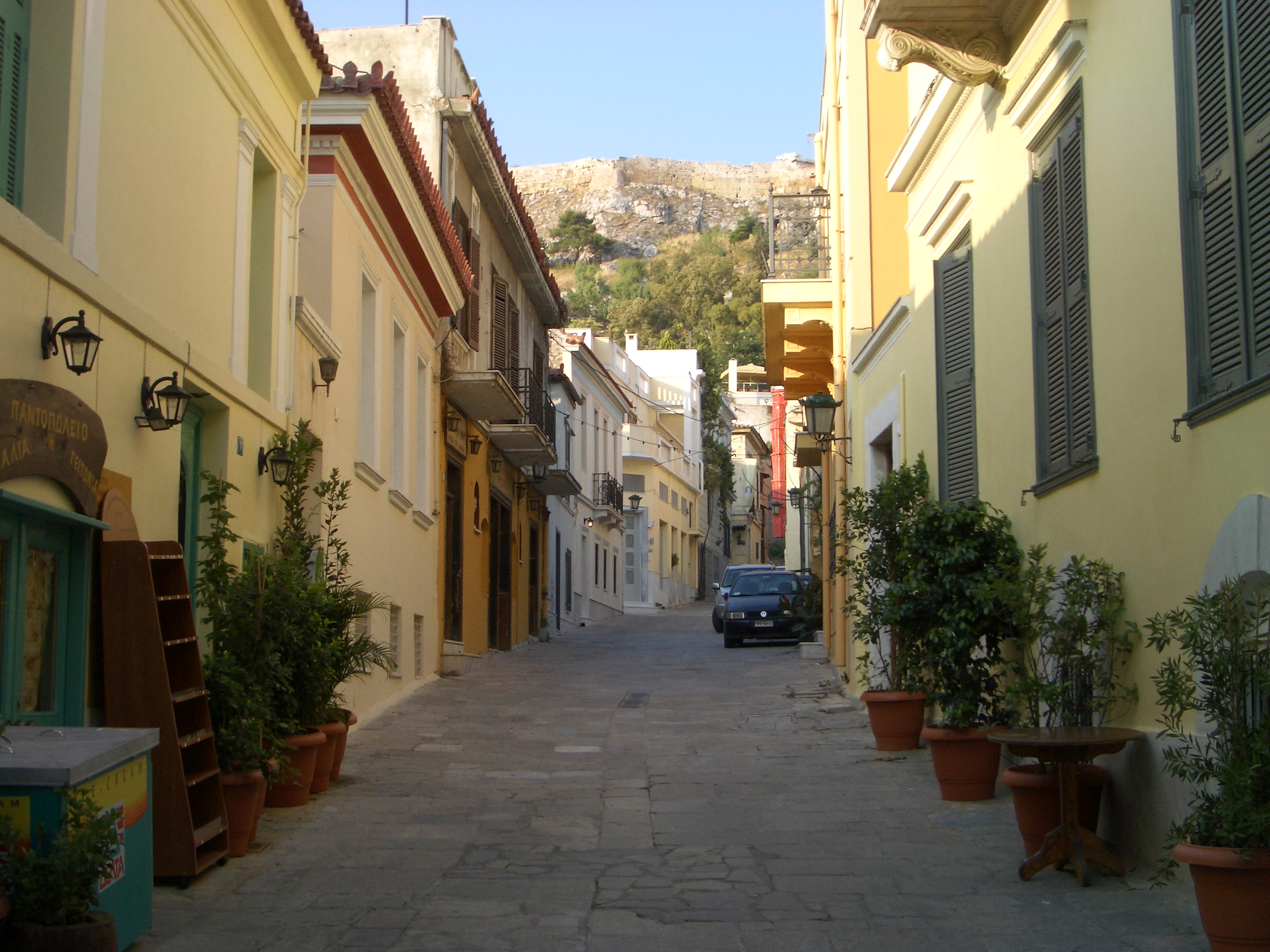
Typical street

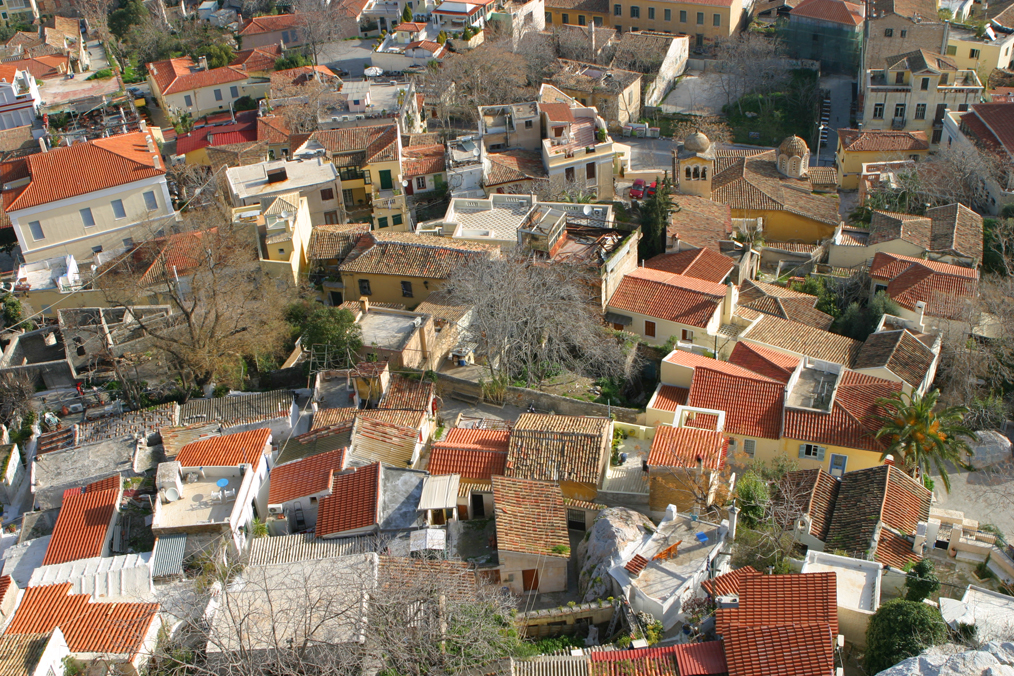
Rooftops of traditional style houses in Plaka.

The toponym Plaka is first attested in the second half of the 17th century. Up until the era of Otto, it pertained only to the area around the Choragic Monument of Lysicrates (locals knew it as "Kandili 'lantern' of Demosthenes" at least since 1460, or just as kandili); it was only after 1834 that the toponym's application gradually expanded to eventually include the entire area between today's Makrygianni Street and the Ancient Agora. Prior of that, the local Athenians referred to the area by various other names, such as Alikokkou, Kontito, Kandili, or by the names of the local churches. In particular, Alikokkou was the name of the broader area of what is now Plaka, until the early 20th century, and was one of the divisions into which Athens was divided during the Ottoman era; the toponym Alikokkou derived from the surname of a family who was likely of Frankish origin, but had been hellenized.

Some have suggested that the toponym Plaka derives from the Arvanitika Pliak Athena, meaning 'Old Athens'; from Albanian plak 'old'. Others have suggested that it derives from the presence of a plaque (Greek: πλάκα; romanized: plaka) which once marked its central intersection. The latter view is also supported by linguist Charalampos Symeonides (2010), who stated that Plaka is a common Medieval and Modern Greek toponym that can be found throughout Greece, and is attested as early as 1089; in the case of Athens, it denoted a place with ancient plaques or marbles.

== Location ==
Plaka is on the northeast slope of Acropolis, between Syntagma and Monastiraki square. Adrianou Street (running north and south) is the largest and most central street in Plaka and divides it into two areas: the upper level, - Ano Plaka - located right under the Acropolis and the lower level - Kato Plaka - situated between Syntagma and Monastiraki.

== History ==
The extent of the area called Plaka has evolved over time. Plaka was developed mostly around the ruins of Ancient Agora of Athens. It is the oldest district of Athens and has been continuously inhabited from the Neolithic to the present day. As a result, Plaka contains monuments from all periods of the city's history. Some of the streets, such as Adrianou and Tripodon, can be traced back to the ancient era. The population of Athens grew during the early 16th century, and the town experienced another urban development after the one which occurred in 1456, this time towards the north-east, again mainly by the settlement of Albanians who had moved in the region several years before the Ottoman arrival. After the Ottoman conquest, these settlements occurred in Attica in one wave after the Venetian loss of its Morean strongholds in 1540, and in another wave after a revolt in the Morea in 1570, when the Ottoman administration decreed the mandatory settlement of Albanians in Attica, in order to offer them improving living conditions. The such created parts of the north-eastern district of Athens later became known as Plaka. During that period, Plaka was also the home of the Greek aristocratic Benizelos family, the family that Saint Philothei came from. In the mid-17th century, out of the eight main administrative units (platomata) in Athens, it appears Plaka was the least densely inhabited.

During the Greek War of Independence, Plaka like the rest of Athens, was temporarily abandoned by its inhabitants because of the severe battles that took place in 1826. The area was repopulated during the first years of the reign of Otto of Greece. Plaka became inhabited by a mixed population, that included old Athenian families, as well as an influx of newcomers, such as artisans, professionals, military personnel, and others. It had a sizable Albanian community until the late 19th century, and as a result, Plaka (as defined at the time) was the Albanian quarter of Athens. They had their own courts where they used the Albanian language. Their descendants nowadays have been assimilated into the Greek nation in considerable numbers. This happened through Greek control over the education system. During the period of Otto's reign, the neighborhood of Anafiotika, featuring traditional Cycladic architecture, was built by settlers from the Aegean island of Anafi.

Plaka assumed its present form during the 19th and early decades of the 20th century. Following Greek independence, the area grew rapidly. In 1884, a fire burned down a large part of the neighborhood which gave the opportunity for the archaeologists to conduct excavations in the Roman Agora and Hadrian's Library. Excavations have been taking place continuously since the 19th century. Growth continued until World War II. From the 1950s until the 1970s, Plaka experienced some degradation, as a result of the post-war construction boom, the increase in motor cars, and the tourist boom. In the 1980s, a comprehensive preservation plan was implemented, and the area improved rapidly. Nowadays Plaka is a major tourist destination.

== Modern neighbourhood ==
Plaka is visited by hundreds of thousands of tourists around the year, and is under strict zoning and conservation regulations, as the only neighborhood in Athens where all utilities (water, power, cable television, telephone, internet, and sewage) lie underground in fully accessible, custom-made tunneling.

Museums in Plaka include:

- Acropolis Museum
- Athens University Museum
- Frissiras Museum
- Jewish Museum of Greece
- Museum of Greek Folk Art, an annex of which is the Old Public Baths building
- Museum of Greek Folk Musical Instruments
- Museum of Pavlos and Alexandra Kanellopoulou

== Cinema ==
Many movies of the Greek cinema were filmed in the area. Some of them include:

- And the Wife Shall Revere Her Husband
- The Drunkard (film)
- What If..., Christoforos Papakaliatis movie
- Woe to the Young

== Gallery ==
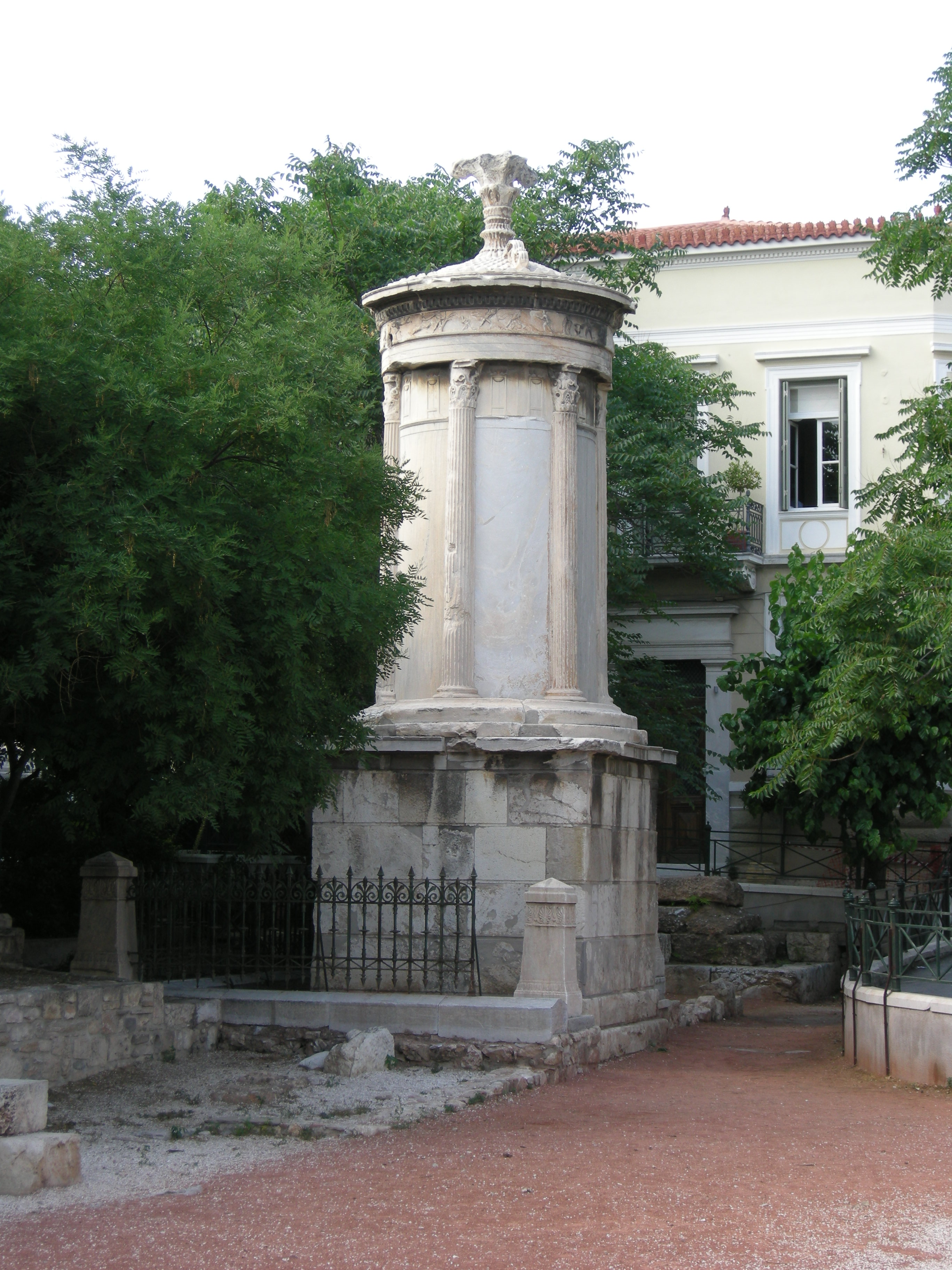
Choragic Monument of Lysicrates

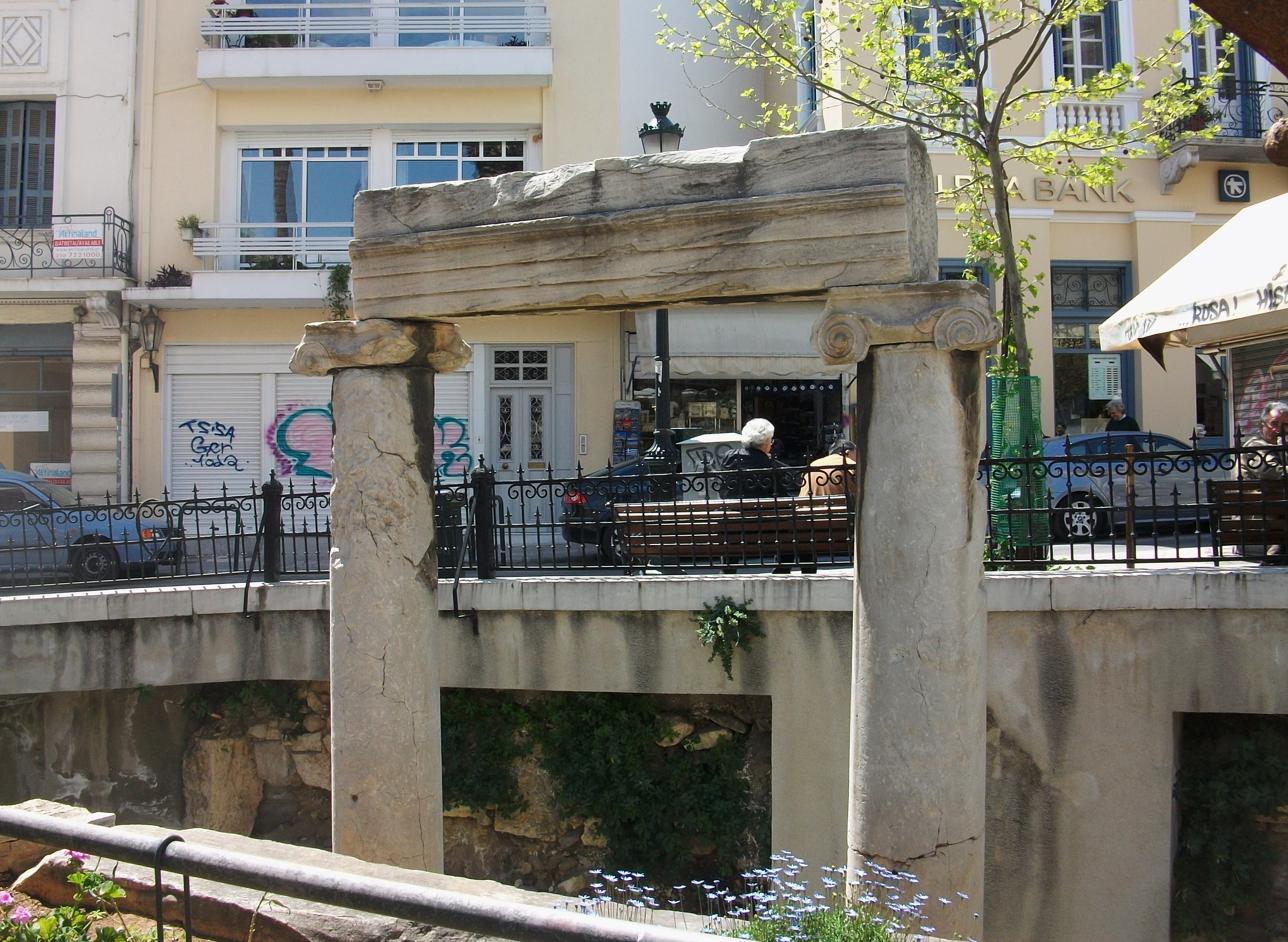
Ancient Roman columns

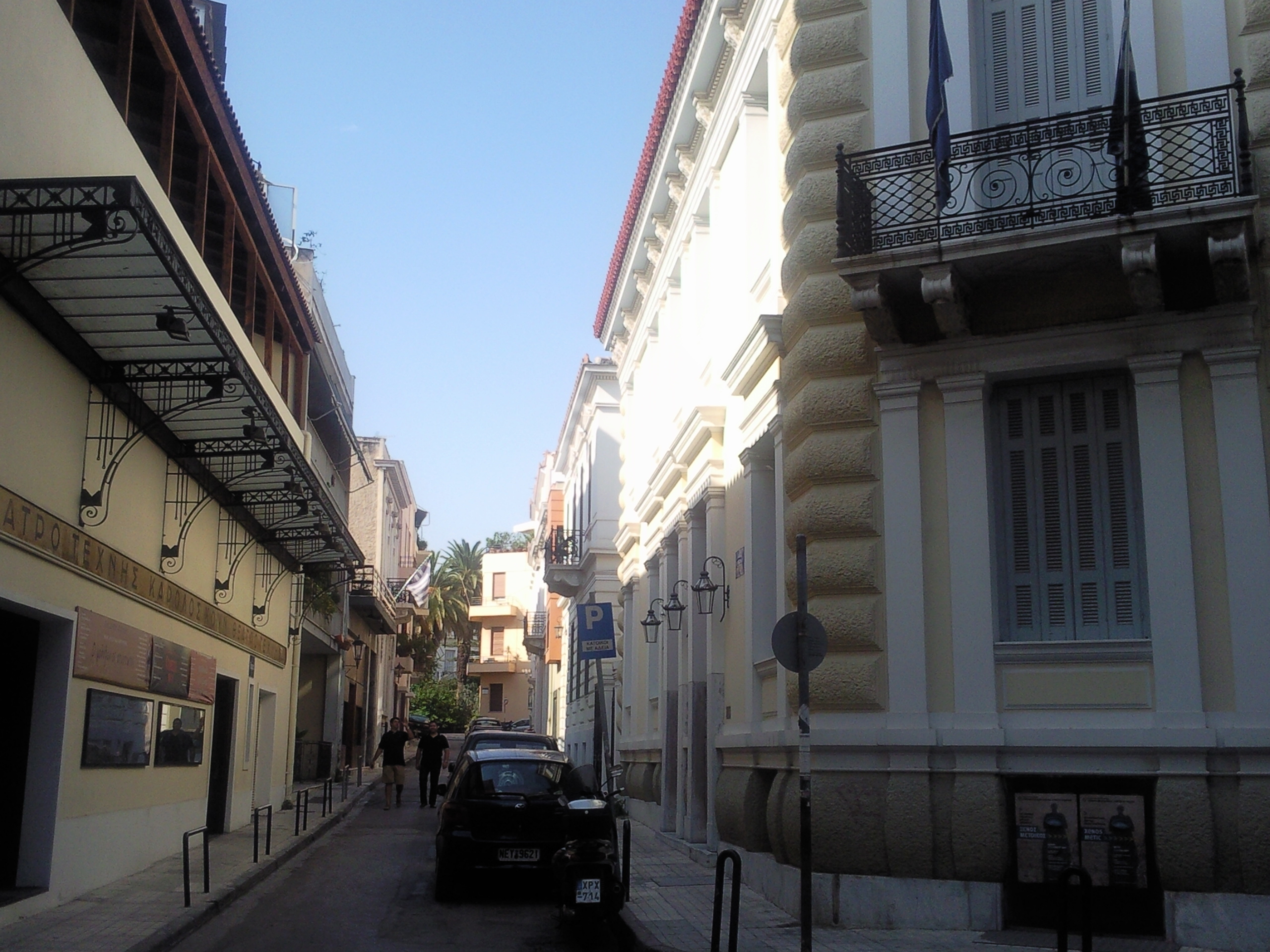
"Karolos Koun" theatre

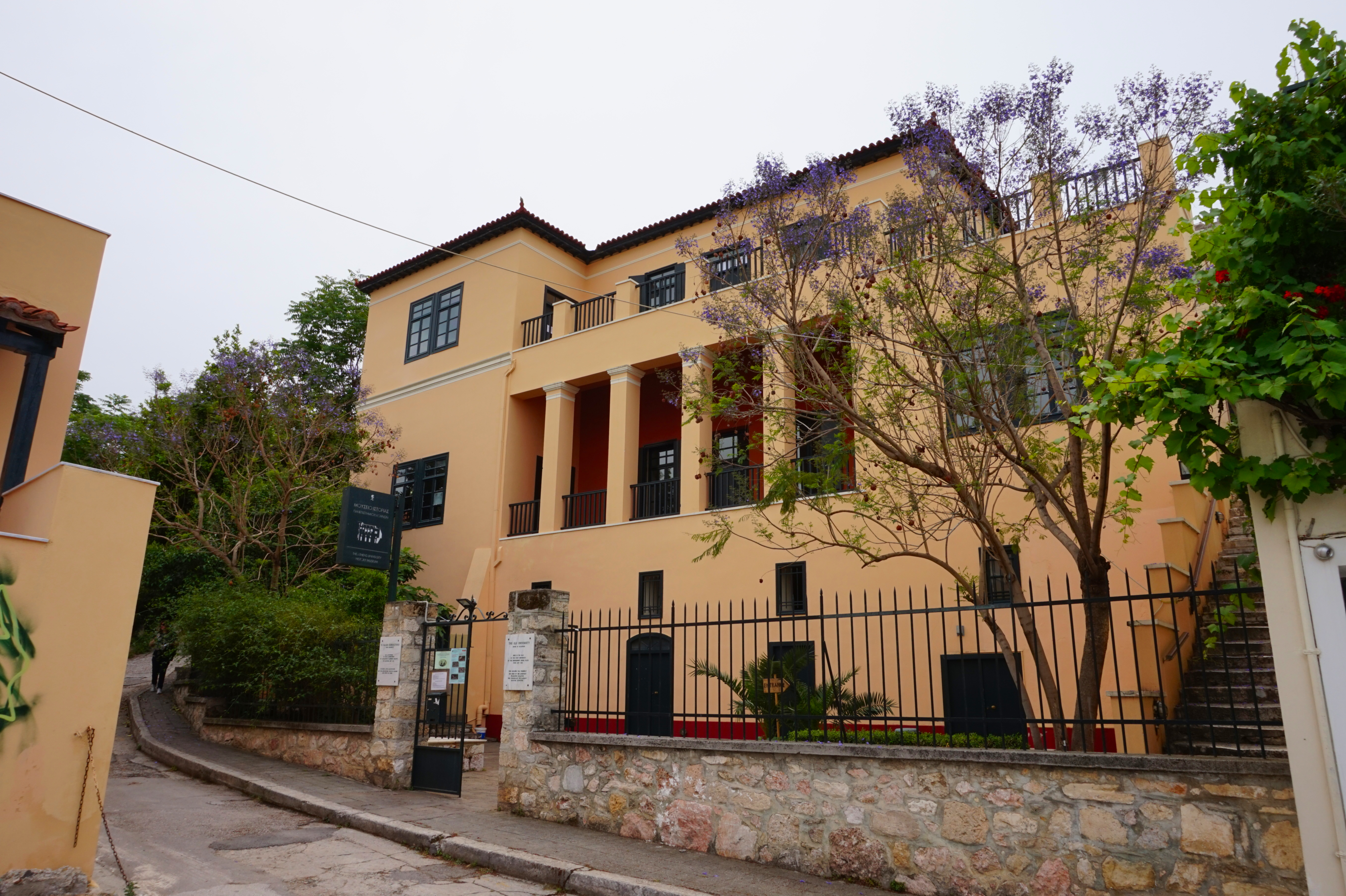
Athens University Museum

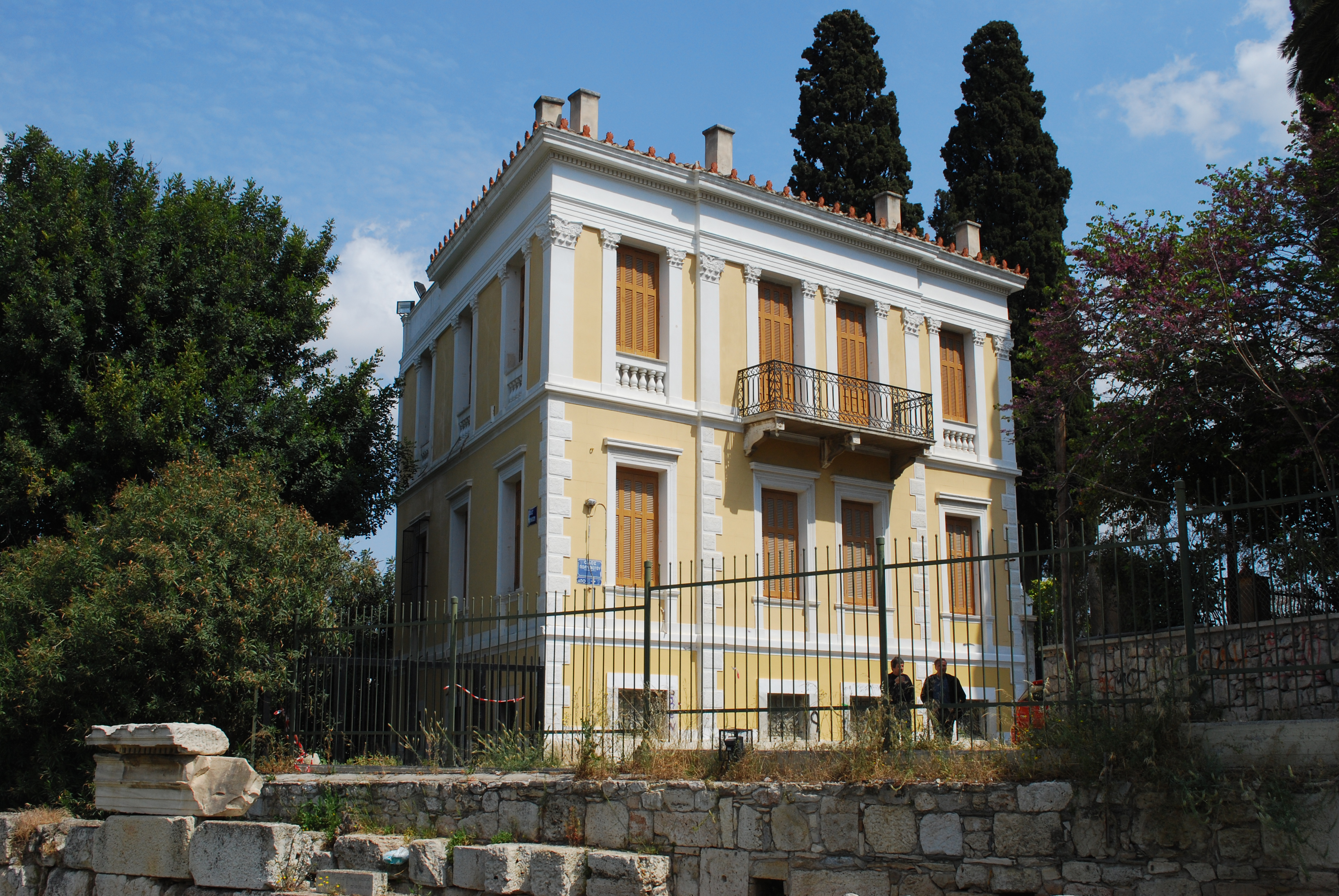
Polygnotou street

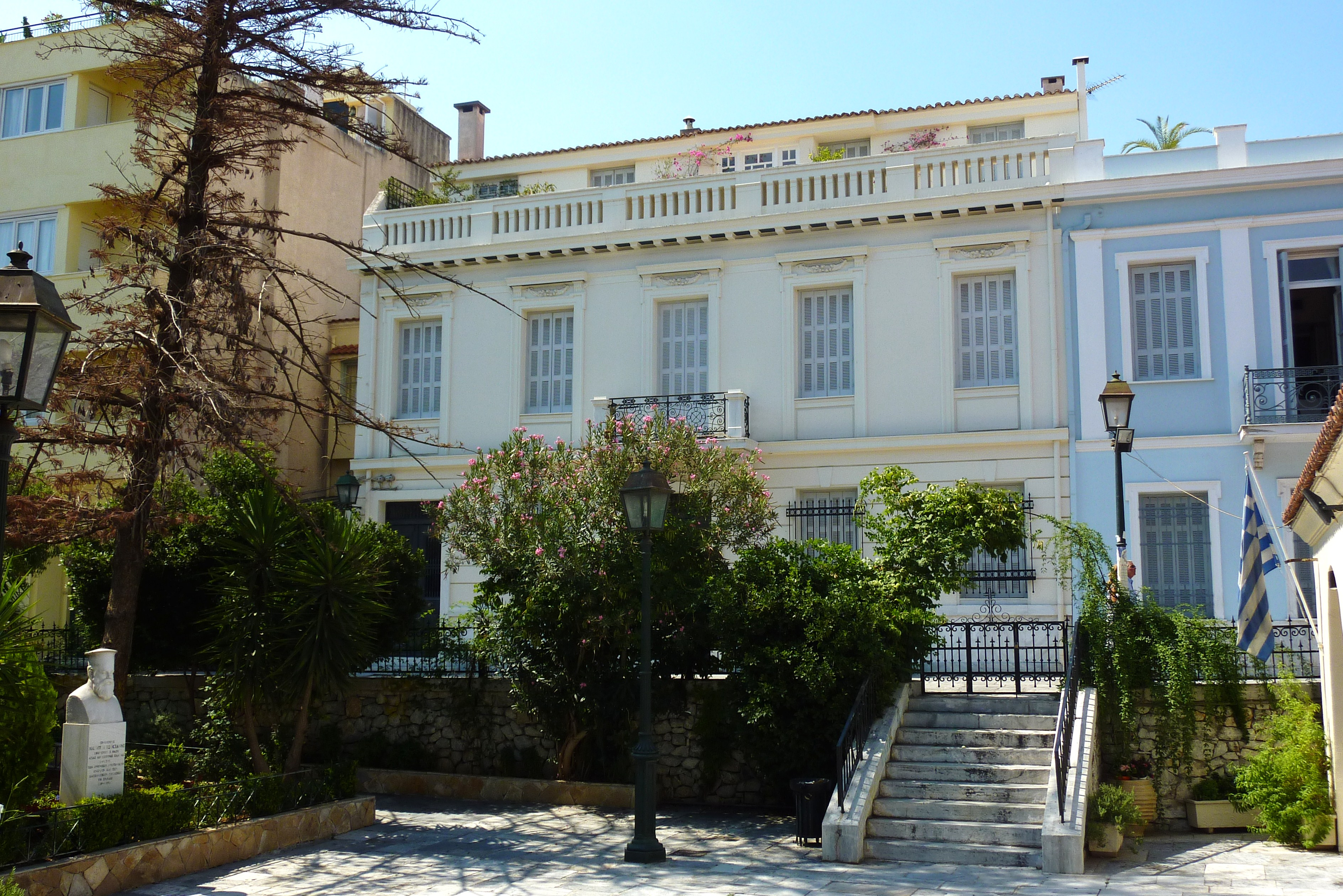
Neoclassical houses

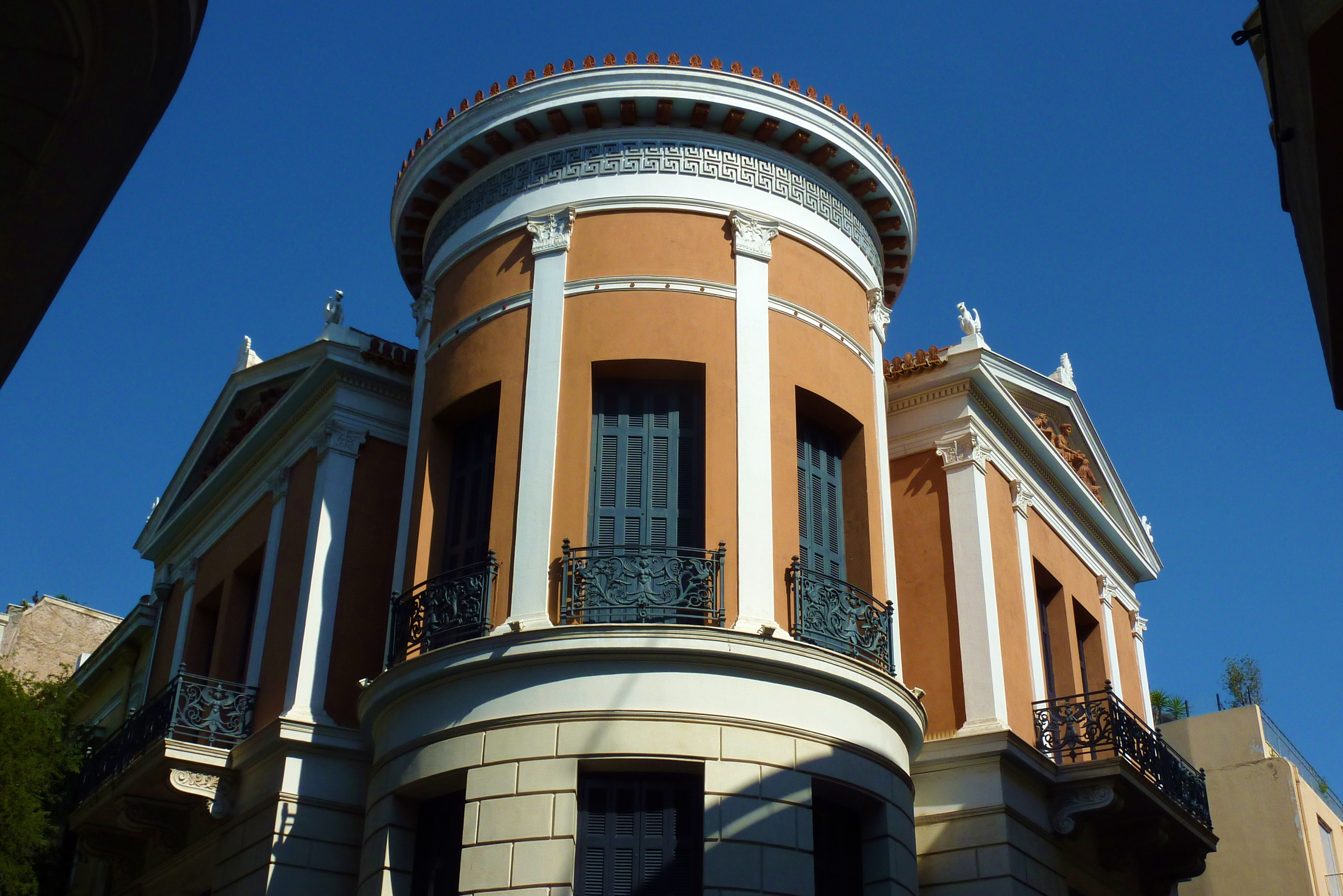
Detail of a building

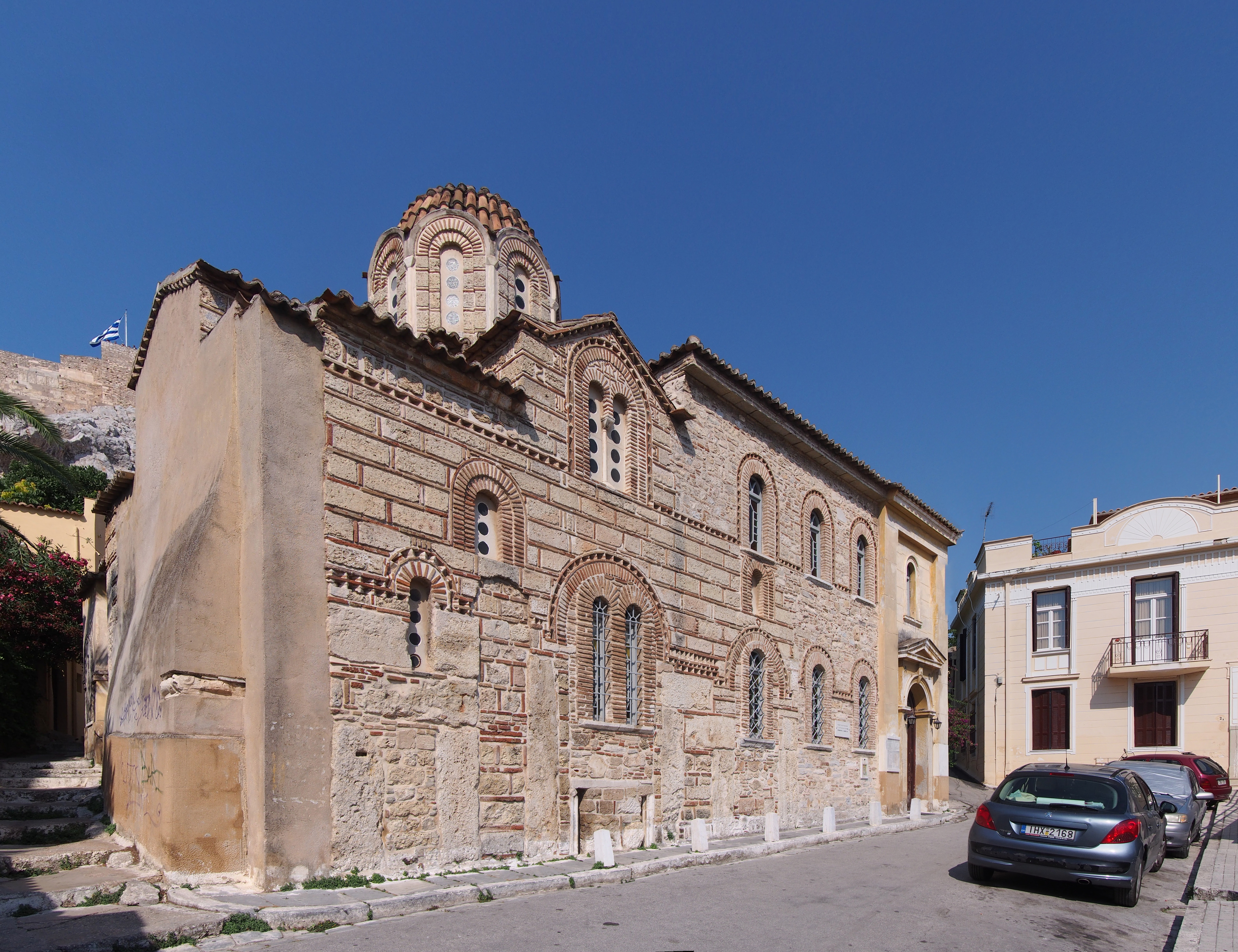
Agios Nikolaos Ragava Byzantine church

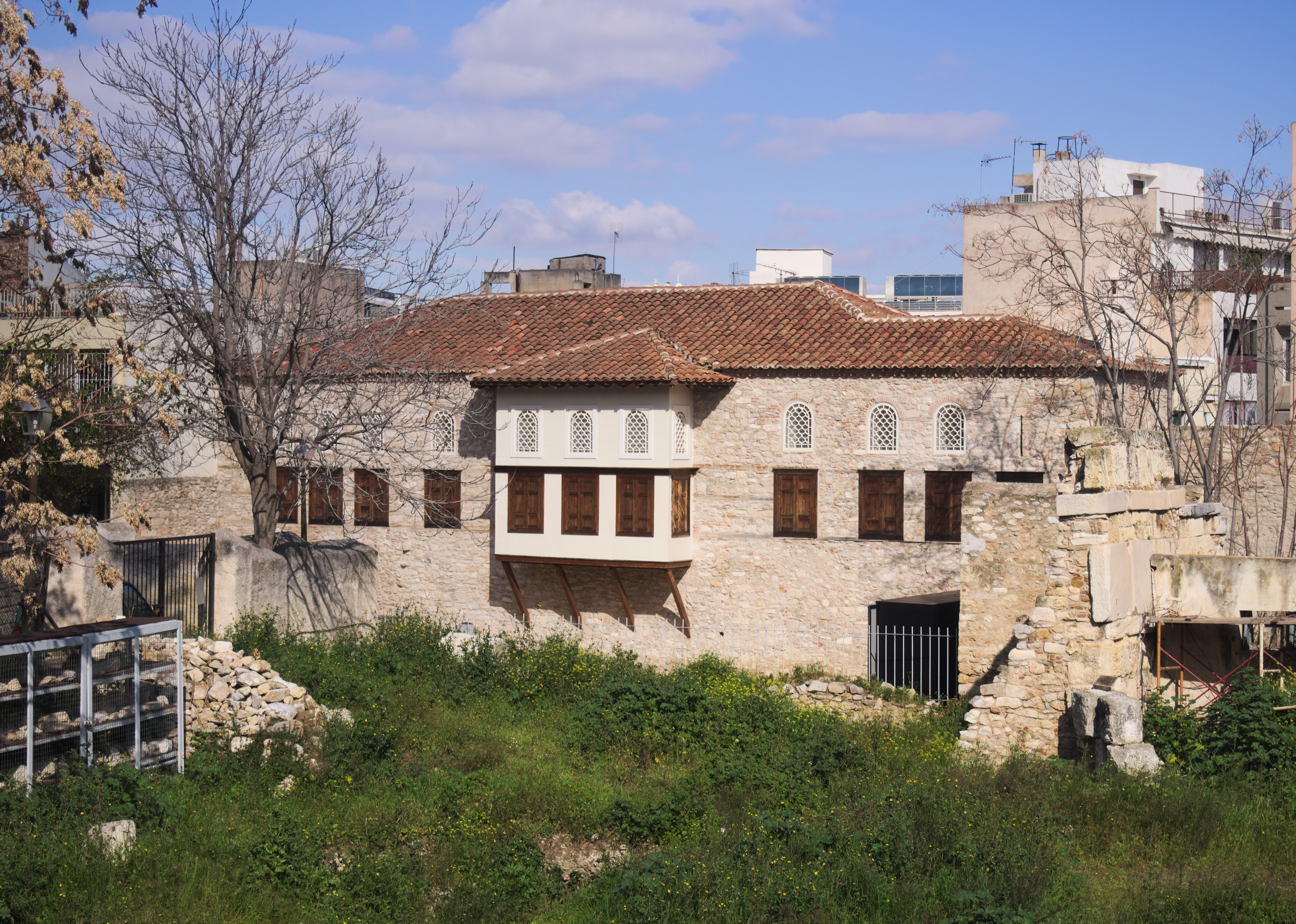
The Benizelos mansion

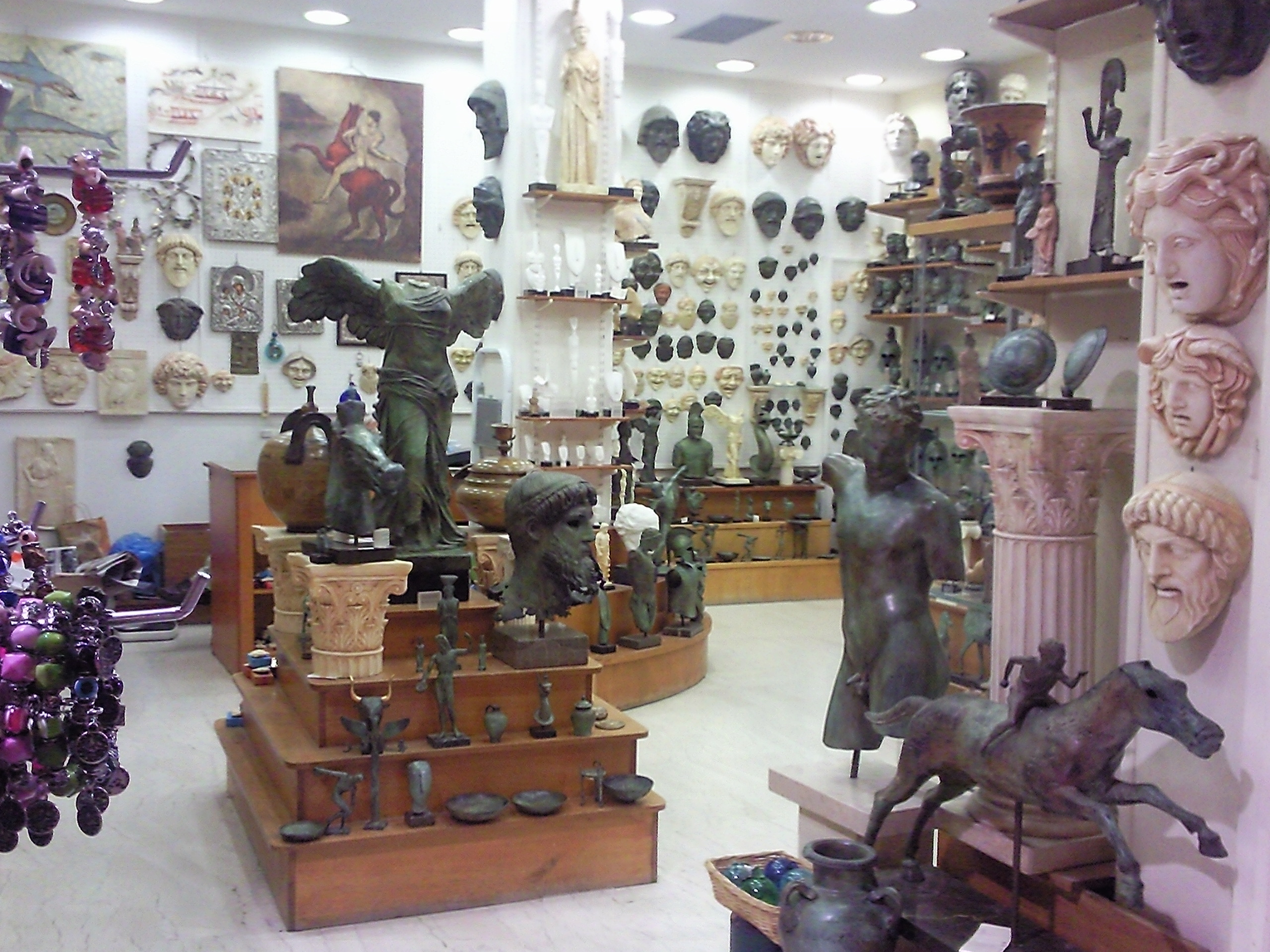
Typical souvenir shop
