= Neophytus II of Constantinople =

Ecumenical Patriarch of Constantinople from 1602 to 1603 and from 1607 to 1612

- Ecumenical Patriarch of Constantinople
- Church: Church of Constantinople
- In office: February 1602 – January 1603; 15 October 1607 – October 1612
- Predecessor: Matthew II of Constantinople; Raphael II of Constantinople
- Successor: Matthew II of Constantinople; Cyril I of Constantinople

Personal details
- Born: Athens
- Died: After 1612
- Denomination: Eastern Orthodoxy

Neophytus II of Constantinople (Greek: Νεόφυτος; died after 1612) was Ecumenical Patriarch of Constantinople twice, in 1602–1603 and in 1607–1612.

An Athenian, he served as Archbishopric of Athens from 1597 until 3 February 1602, when he was elected as Ecumenical Patriarch of Constantinople in the place of his rival, Matthew II of Constantinople. His tenure was cut short a year later when he was deposed amid accusations of various scandals. He was initially exiled to Rhodes, and thence to Saint Catherine's Monastery in the Sinai.

He was restored to the patriarchal throne on 15 October 1607 and held it for five years. During his second tenure, he took care of aligning church administrative practice and canon law with the contemporary needs and took measures to replenish the patriarchal coffers. He was also in contact with Western potentates, including Pope Paul V and King Philip III of Spain, whom he urged to engage in a crusade to liberate the Orthodox Christians from the Ottoman Empire, going as far as to make considerable concessions to the doctrine of the Catholic Church, including recognising papal primacy. His pro-Western policy and financial exactions made him many enemies, including Cyril I of Constantinople, who succeeded in securing his deposition in October 1612. Originally slated to be exiled to Rhodes again, he was protected by his successor, Timothy II of Constantinople, who had been his protégé.

== Notes and references ==
Eastern Orthodox Church titles
Preceded by Matthew II (2)	Ecumenical Patriarch of Constantinople; 1602 – 1603	Succeeded by Matthew II (3)
Preceded by Raphael II	Ecumenical Patriarch of Constantinople; 1607 – 1612	Succeeded by Cyril I
