= Doliana, Ioannina =

Greek village

Doliana Δολιανά
- Community
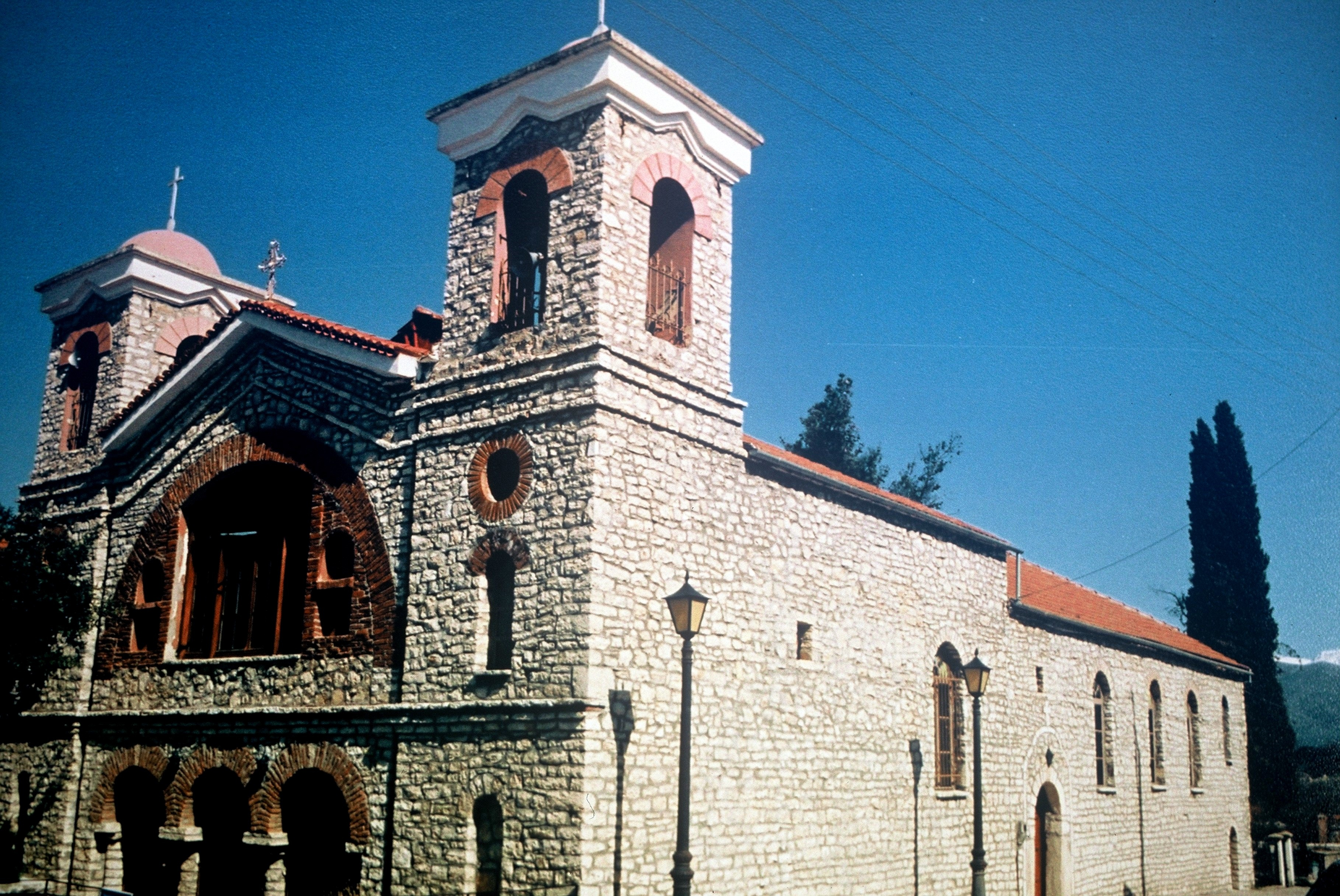
- Doliana

- Location within Greece
- Coordinates: 39°54′6.1″N 20°34′45.1″E
- Country: Greece
- Administrative region: Epirus
- Regional unit: Ioannina
- Municipality: Pogoni
- Municipal unit: Kalpaki

Population (2021)
  - Community: 369
- Time zone: UTC+2 (EET)
  - Summer (DST): UTC+3 (EEST)

Doliana (Greek: Δολιανά) is a village in the Ioannina Regional Unit in Epirus, northwestern Greece.

== Name ==
The scholar Ioannis Lambridis stated Dholiana had the meaning 'low place'. The linguist Max Vasmer etymologically derived the toponym from the Slavic form Doljane meaning 'inhabitant of the valley', which stemmed from the Slavic word dolъ 'valley' and the suffix -jani.

== History ==
During the Ottoman period, Doliana was a chiflik (estate) under the administration of an Ottoman official; its status changed after the village bought itself out and became somewhat autonomous. Doliana was an important centre for trade and its location close to a hill, near the Doliana plain was for security reasons. Merchants and traders from Doliana bought and sold goods from and to people passing through the region. Following the Second World War, Doliana, located among hilly terrain was replaced as a regional centre by both Parakalamos and Kalpaki on the Doliana plain, due in part to their accessibility.

== Demographics ==
Doliana is inhabited by Aromanians, Roma and Greeks; the village has three neighbourhoods, each separately associated with the particular community residing within it. Some Roma are musicians.

== Notable people ==
Georgios Gennadios, a prominent figure in the Modern Greek Enlightenment, was raised in the village although he was born in Thrace.
