= Joannes Gennadius =

Greek diplomat and bibliophile (1844–1932)

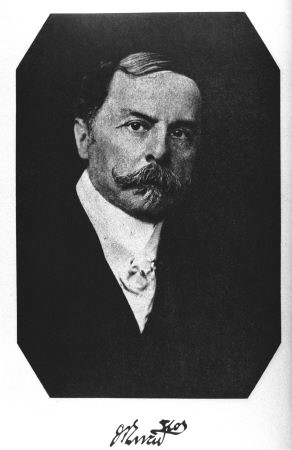
- Gennadius in 1914
- Born: Ἰωάννης Γεννάδιος; 7 January 1844; Athens, Greece
- Died: 7 September 1932 (aged 88); London, England
- Occupations: Diplomat, bibliophile, writer
- Spouse: Florence Laing Kennedy (1853–1952)

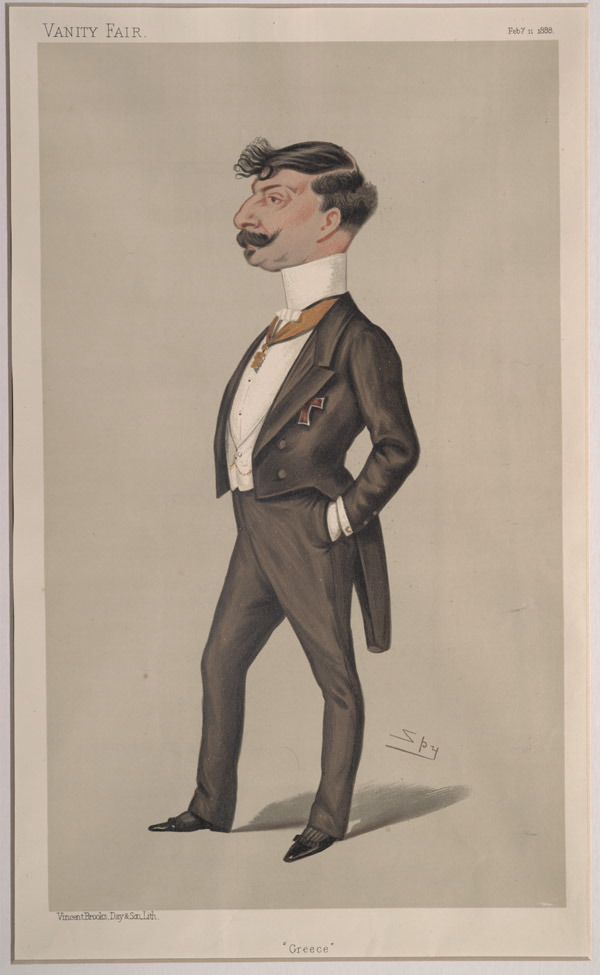
Caricature by Spy, 1888

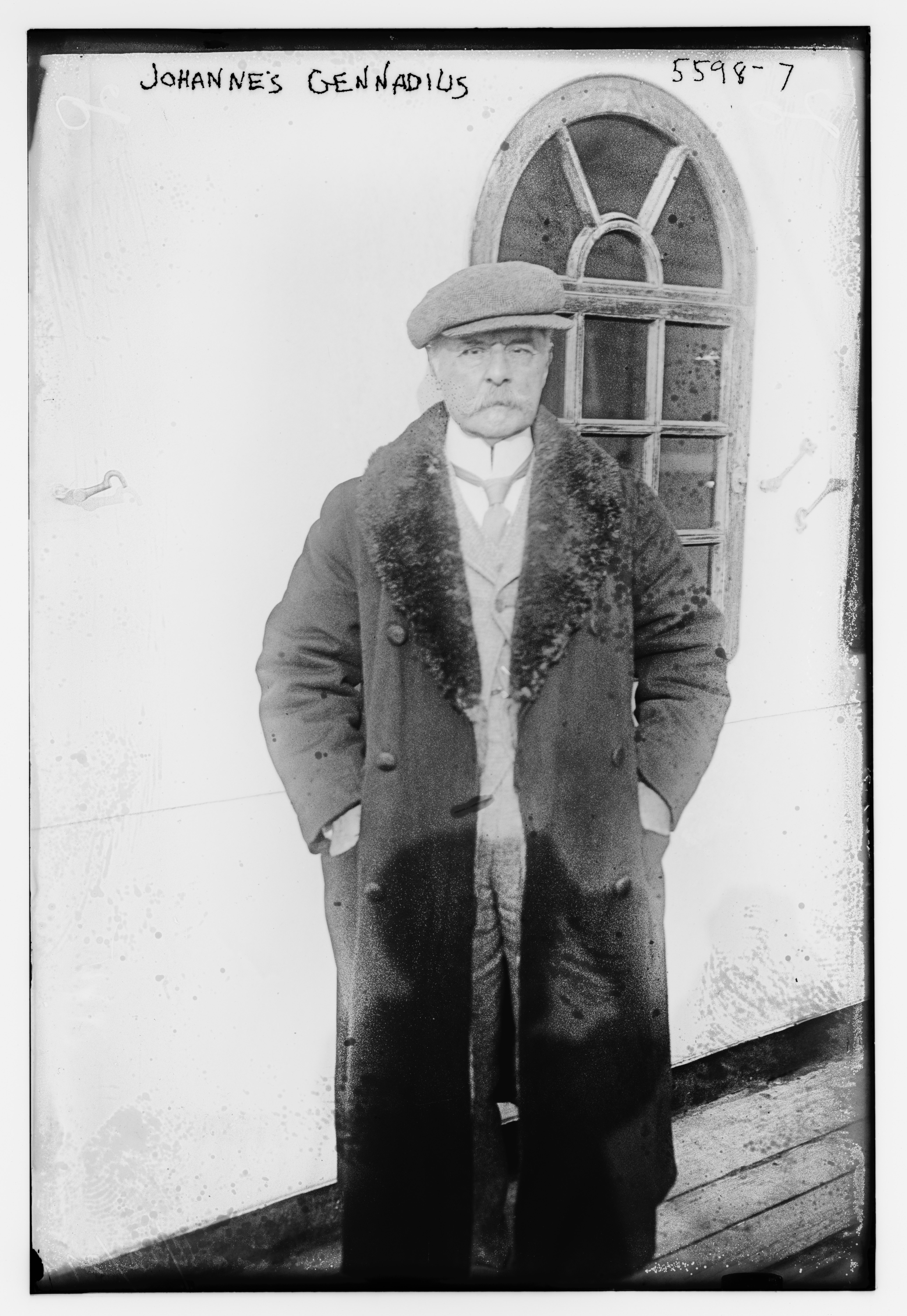
Gennadius in 1921

Joannes, Ioannes or John Gennadius (Greek: Ἰωάννης Γεννάδιος, 1844–1932) was a Greek diplomat, writer, and speaker, best known for his donation of his collection of Greek books and art to the Gennadius Library.

== Early and personal life ==
Gennadius was born in Athens on January 19 [O.S. January 7] 1844, the son of Georgios Gennadios, a man of letters, and Artemis Gennadios, a descendant of Ioannis Benizelos. His father died when he was 10. He was educated at the English-language Malta Protestant College and at the University of Athens. In November 1862, at age 18, he left the university and traveled to London. In Britain, he worked at Ralli Brothers, returning briefly to Athens to work as a journalist.

Gennadius married in London on 27 December 1902 Florence Laing Kennedy (1853–1952), the widow of the artist Edward Sherard Kennedy and daughter of Samuel Laing. There were two ceremonies, first at the Greek Church of St Sofia, then at the Anglican church of St Peter, Cranley Gardens. They set up household at 14 De Vere Gardens, Kensington. They moved to East Molesey, Surrey, in 1924. Gennadius died in London in 1932 and his wife died in 1952.

== Diplomatic career ==
His first public role was during the Dilessi murders in 1870. Four travelers in Greece were murdered by brigands, prompting an "angry outburst of anti-Greek feeling in London". Though his employers, the Ralli Brothers, told him to remain silent, he researched the incident and wrote a 192-page pamphlet about it which he then delivered to one hundred members of Parliament. He was fired from his job, but became a hero to Greeks in Greece and abroad. In 1873, the Greek government appointed him Second Secretary in Constantinople. In 1874, he was transferred to London, and in May 1875, he was named Chargé d'affaires. He then had a series of increasingly senior postings in London, Vienna, the Netherlands, and the United States, but was recalled to Athens in 1892. It was only in 1910 that he was reappointed as Minister in London and The Hague. He retired in 1918, but served as the Greek representative to the Washington Naval Conference from 1921 to 1922.

== Book collecting and public life ==
Gennadius had started collecting books young. In 1867, for the Exposition Universelle in Paris, he prepared an exhibit and catalogue raisonné for all of the newspapers and periodicals published in Greece in 1866. In 1872, his personal library was not especially notable. The one "treasure" of his collection at that time was a first edition of the Erotokritos. During the period 1874 to 1880, his collecting became more systematic, including not just books, but also drawings and prints on Turkish and Greek life and costume. In the 1880s, he "formed the 'grand design' that was to dominate his collecting for the rest of his life: to form a library that represented the creative genius of Greece at all periods, the influence of her arts and sciences upon the western world, and the impression created by her natural beauty upon the traveller", with the plan of donating it to the National Library of Greece.

In the meantime, he organized various activities in support of Greece. He arranged the donation of 6,000 books to the Parliamentary Library. He helped form the Greek Committee, with Lord Rosebery as president. He helped found the Society for the Promotion of Hellenic Studies.

In 1922, he offered his collection of 24,000 volumes to the American School of Classical Studies in Athens. A site for a library building was donated by the Greek government and funding for the building by the Carnegie Corporation. Gennadius and his wife formally dedicated it on April 23, 1926.

== Honors ==
- Gold Cross of the Order of the Redeemer, Greece, 1879
- Honorary Doctor of Civil Law, Oxford University, 1882
- Grand Cross of the Royal Victorian Order, 1918
