= Patriarch Silvester of Alexandria =

Greek Orthodox Patriarch of Alexandria

Silvester served as Greek Patriarch of Alexandria between 1569 and 1590.

Preceded by Joachim	Greek Patriarch of Alexandria; 1569–1590	Succeeded by Meletius I
