= Philothei of Athens =

Greek saint

Saint Philothei of Athens

New Martyr
- Born: November 21, 1522; Athens, Greece then Ottoman Empire
- Died: February 19, 1589 (aged 66)
- Venerated in: Eastern Orthodoxy
- Feast: February 19
- Patronage: Athens, Women and Charitable works

Philothei of Athens, (also known as Philotheia or Philothea) (Greek: Άγια Φιλοθέη η Αθηναία) (November 21, 1522 - February 19, 1589), née Revoula Benizelos (Ρεβούλα Μπενιζέλου), was a Greek Orthodox religious sister, martyr and saint from Ottoman-era Greece.

== Life ==
Philothei was born as Revoula Benizelou in Athens on November 21, 1522, to the illustrious and wealthy Benizelos family. Her parents were Angelos Benizelos and Syrigi Palaiologina, both from old Byzantine families. They had no children, but after fervent prayer her mother gave birth to a daughter whom they named Revoula, her birth name. Against her will, she was married at the age of 14 to the noble Andrea Chila, who mistreated her. When he died in 1539, she was only 17, beautiful and wealthy and her parents insisted that she get remarried. Instead, she remained at home, spending much of her time in prayer. The family wealth gave her the opportunity for charitable work, and while still a young woman she had gained the respect and love of the community.

When her parents died in 1549, Philothei found herself the owner of extensive holdings. She took up the monastic life and around 1551, establishing a women's monastery under the patronage of Saint Andrew. She took the name Philothei. There the young nuns taught handiwork, weaving, housekeeping and cooking. In this way, she prepared the young women who came to her for the domestic life.

Philothei is primarily remembered for her abundant philanthropy. The convent had a great deal of charity establishments both in Athens and on the islands of the Aegean Sea. Philothei founded a second, more secluded monastery at Patisia. She also built hospices, homes for the elderly, and schools for the girls and boys of Athens. One of her more controversial activities was to buy the freedom of Greeks taken as slaves by the Ottoman Turks, especially women taken to the harems. She offered shelter to the young women, some pregnant. Despite being hunted by the Turks, she helped them escape secretly to Tzia, Andros, Aegina and Salamina, where they were safe. In a 22 February 1583 letter to the Venetian Senate, Philothei asked for monetary support to pay off her debts from ransom money, duties, bribes, and taxes that she owed to the occupying Turks. Her monasteries were frequently plundered, and the farming and agricultural program, which were a basic source of sustaining her work, devastated.

Four women enslaved by the Ottoman Turks in harems also ran to her for refuge. The women were traced, and Philothei was beaten and brought before the magistrate who put her in prison. Friends intervened and paid the district governor for her release. As her fame grew, so did the animosity against her. On 3 October 1588, four Ottoman mercenaries broke into the monastery at Patisia during the evening vigil service and beat her severely. She remained bedridden and died of her injuries on 19 February 1589.

== Benizelos mansion ==
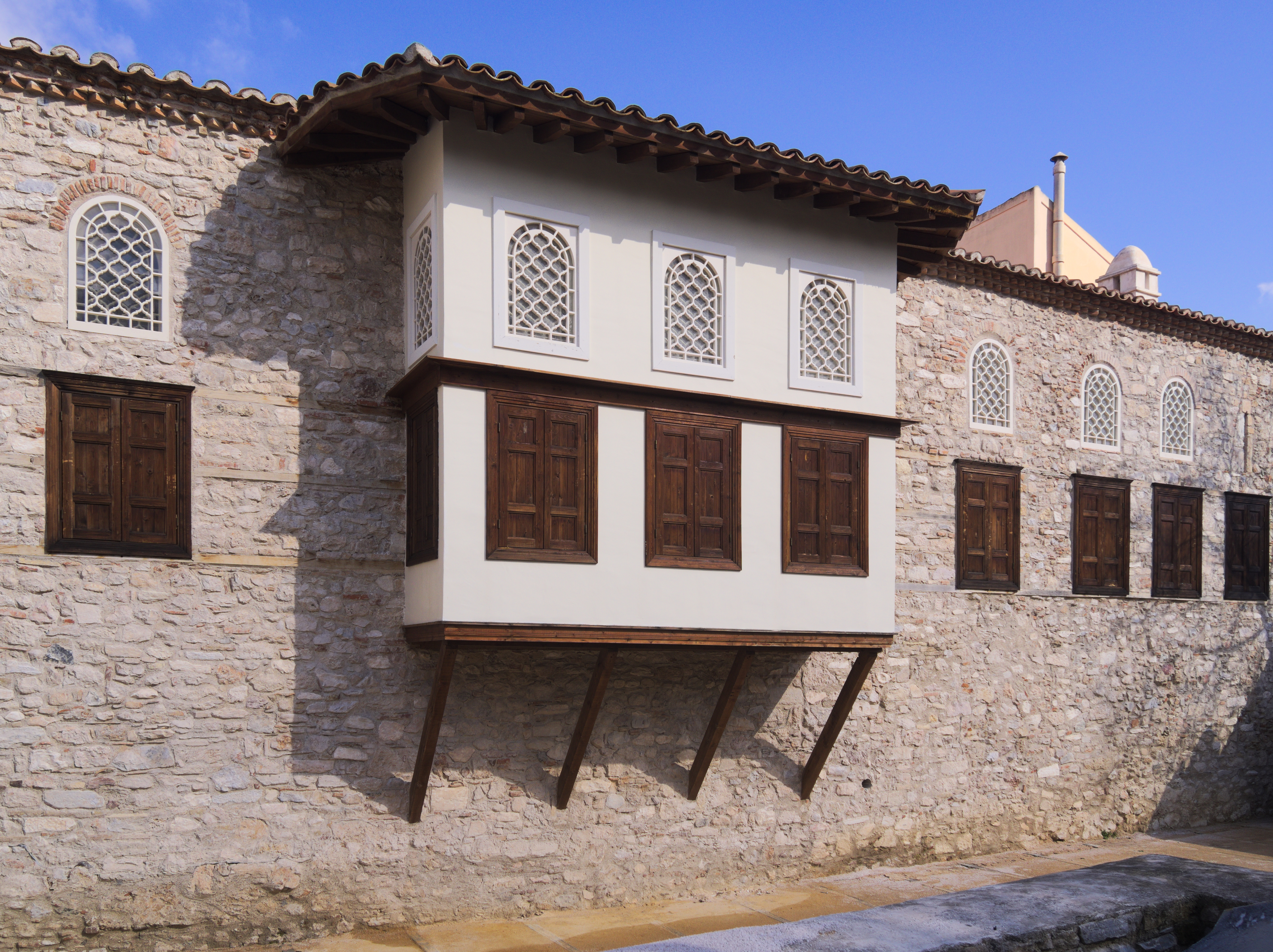
The bay window at the south facade of Benizelos mansion.

The mansion of Philothei's family locates in Plaka and is probably the oldest house in Athens.

== Veneration ==
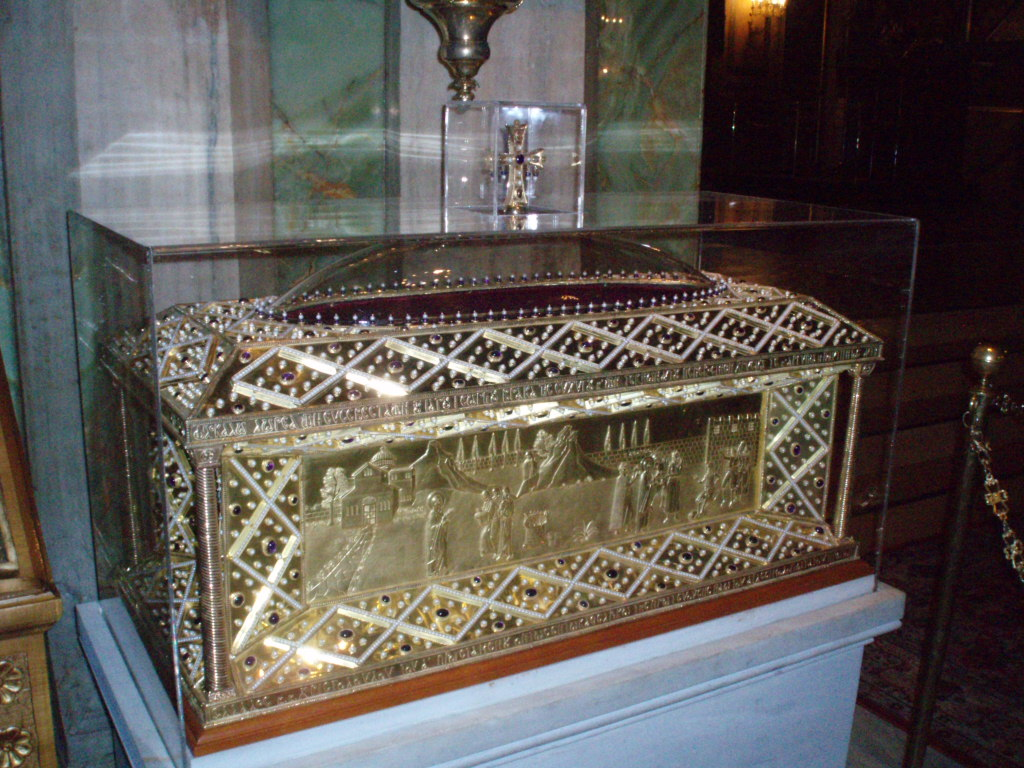
The shrine of Saint Filothei

Philothei is considered a martyr by the Eastern Orthodox Church. Just a few years after her death, she was canonized as a saint, in the days of the Ecumenical Patriarch Matthew the Second (1595-1600). Her memory is venerated on February 19. Along with Hierotheus and Dionysius the Areopagite, Philothei is considered a patron saint of the city of Athens. Her relics are interred in the Metropolitan Cathedral of Athens. The Filothei district of Athens is named after her.

Philothei has a Troparion written about her:

Troparion to St. Philothei (Tone 5) The Faithful of Athens and all the world honor Philothei the martyred nun and rejoice in her holy relics. For she has exchanged this passing life for the life that knows no end through her struggle and martyrdom; and she begs the Savior to have mercy on us all.
