= Georgios Gennadios =

Greek scholar (1784–1854)

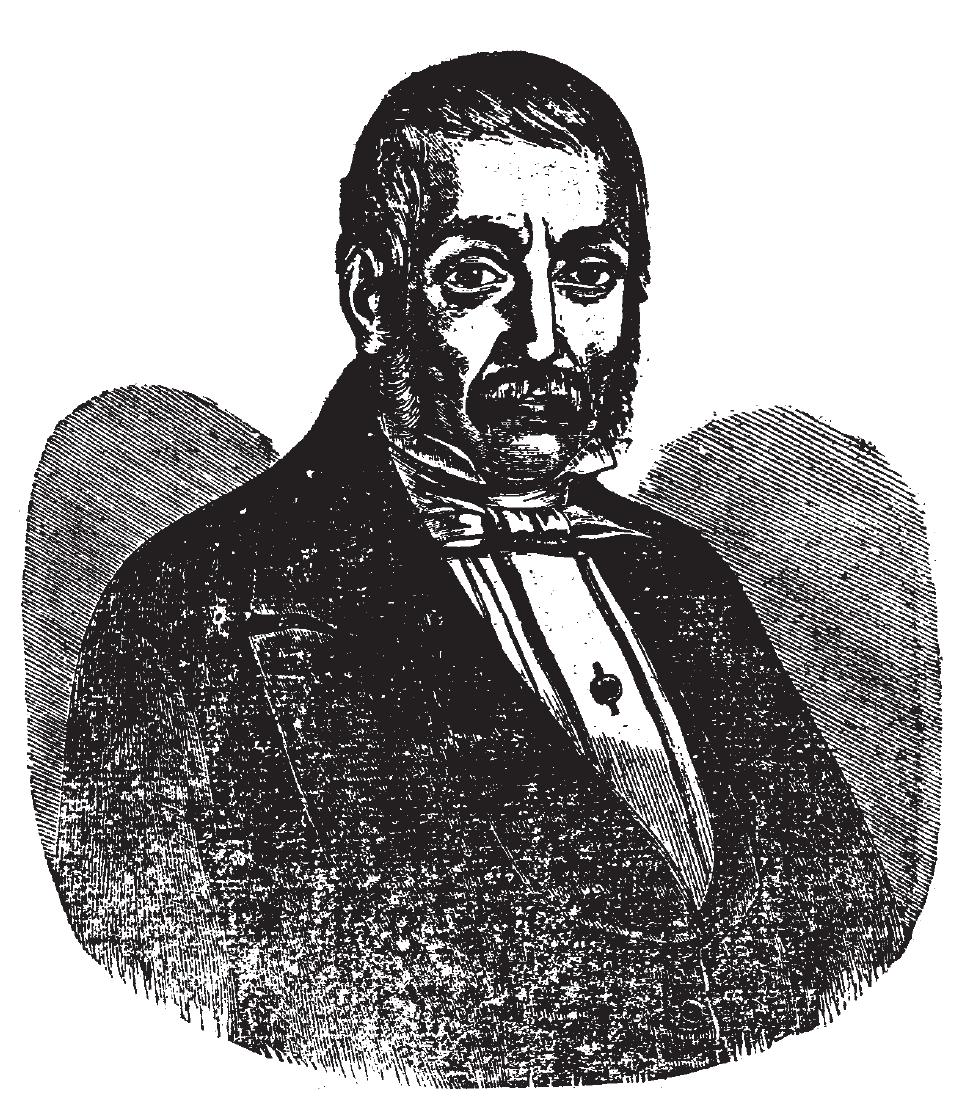
Georgios Gennadios

Georgios Gennadios (Greek: Γεώργιος Γεννάδιος; 1784–1854) was a Greek scholar who was instrumental in the founding of some of the first educational establishments of modern Greece, considered among the most important personalities of the Modern Greek Enlightenment.

== Life ==
Gennadios was born in 1784 in Selymbria, Eastern Thrace and grew up in Doliana, his family's village in Epirus. He started his studies in Doliana and possibly also in Monodendri. He continued his studies in the schools of Ioannina and subsequently in Bucharest (now capital of Romania, but then part of Wallachia). In 1804 he began to study philology at the University of Leipzig under Wilhelm Ernst Weber. He returned to Bucharest upon completion of his studies in 1814.

At 1815 he became an assistant to Neophytos Doukas, then at the Princely Academy of Bucharest. In 1817–20 he went to Odessa, following an invitation by the city’s Greek community and by Ioannis Kapodistrias, then Russia's foreign minister, where he helped to found and direct the Greek School of Commerce. In 1820 he returned to Bucharest following an invitation by Prince Alexandros Soutzos of Wallachia and taught in the city’s schools. That year he also became a member of the Filiki Eteria revolutionary organization. Following the defeat of Alexandros Ypsilantis in 1821 he went to Odessa and from there to Dresden. He returned to Greece in 1826 to take part in the Greek War of Independence.

Following the establishment of the independent Greek state, Gennadios was appointed by Kapodistrias, now Governor of Greece, together with Georgios Konstantas and Ioannis Benthylos to compile an official grammar of the Greek language. He founded the Central School of Aegina, later transferred to Athens. In 1832, he was appointed first director of the National Library of Greece in Athens. He founded the Philekpaideutike Etaireía (Φιλεκπαιδευτική Εταιρεία, "Society of the Friends of Education"), taught at the Arsakeion School in Athens and briefly taught history at the University of Athens. He also founded the Archaeological Society of Athens and initiated the numismatic collection eventually housed at the Numismatic Museum of Athens. Among his students were Constantine Paparrigopoulos and Alexandros Rizos Rangavis.

In 1854, during the Crimean War, he led a revolutionary committee for the liberation of Epirus, his homeland, but died the same year during a cholera epidemic. Gennadios's statue was placed in front of the National Library of Greece following the construction of Theophil Hansen's neoclassical building to house the collections of the library in 1903.

Gennadios's son Joannes Gennadius was born in 1844 and became a diplomat and bibliophile. When he donated his important book collection to the American School of Classical Studies in Athens, the building built to house it was named in honor of Georgios as the Gennadeion.

== Works ==
- Grammar of the ancient Greek language, (Γραμματική της αρχαίας Ελληνικής γλώσσης, 1832).
- Edited Σύνοψις της Ιεράς Ιστορίας (1835) and Κατήχησις ή Ορθόδοξος διδασκαλία της Ανατολικής Εκκλησίας (1835).

== See also ==
- Gennadius Library
