= Gennadius Library =

Library in Athens

Coordinates: 37°58′47.4″N 23°44′55.2″E

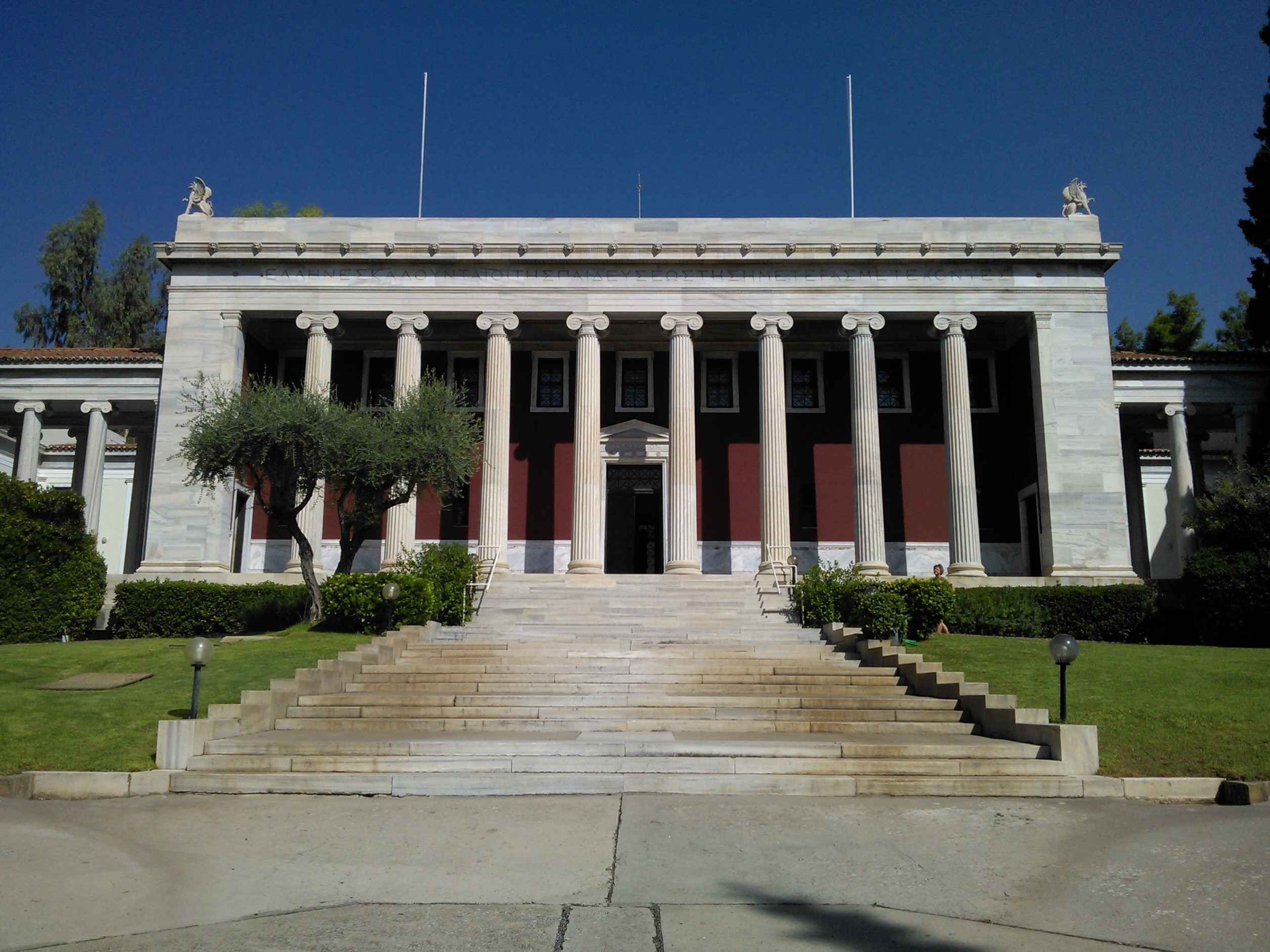
The Gennadius Library main building in Athens, designed by the American architects John Van Pelt and W. Stuart Thompson and inaugurated in 1926.

The Gennadius Library (Greek: Γεννάδειος Βιβλιοθήκη), also known as the Gennadeion, is one of the most important libraries in Greece, with over 110,000 volumes on Greek history, literature and art from Antiquity until modern times. The library is located at Souidias Street 61, on the slopes of Mount Lycabettus, in central Athens.

The library is one of the two belonging to the American School of Classical Studies at Athens (along with the Blegen Library).

== History ==
Its main founder was the Greek diplomat and bibliophile Joannes Gennadius (1844–1932), who initially donated part of his collection to the newly founded National Library of Greece. Returning to Athens a few years later he was distraught to discover they had no reference to his donated items, and so he resolved to find a better home for his collection. While attending the Washington Naval Treaty, American scholars showed interest in founding a dedicated facility in Greece.

A dedicated neoclassical building was built, with financial support from the Carnegie Corporation, to house the 26,000 volumes donated by Gennadius. The building was designed by the New York firm of Van Pelt and Thompson, in the style of a classical temple with gardens. The library opened on 23 April 1926 and was named in honour of Gennadius' father, George Gennadius (1786–1854).

Since 1999 the library has been expanded and modernised with air conditioning, a new auditorium, and an east wing. These were inaugurated in 2005 with new offices and storage areas for the Gennadeion Archives and the rest of the collection. These works were largely funded through fund raising in America, with Lloyd Cotsen as a leading benefactor. Some of the original Gennadius collection has been digitized and placed on-line, including his scrapbooks and ephemera.

== See also ==
- List of libraries in Greece
