= Matthew II of Constantinople =

Three-time Ecumenical Patriarch of Constantinople from 1596 to 1603

- Ecumenical Patriarch of Constantinople
- Church: Church of Constantinople
- In office: February 1596; April 1598 – January 1602; January – February 1603
- Predecessor: Jeremias II of Constantinople; Meletius I of Constantinople; Neophytus II of Constantinople
- Successor: Gabriel I of Constantinople; Neophytus II of Constantinople; Raphael II of Constantinople
- Previous post: Metropolitan of Ioannina

Personal details
- Born: Klinovos, Greece
- Died: February 1603
- Denomination: Eastern Orthodoxy

Matthew II of Constantinople (Greek: Ματθαῖος; died 1603) was Ecumenical Patriarch of Constantinople three times, shortly in 1596 (20 days), from 1598 to 1602 and for a few days in 1603 (17 days).

== Life ==
Member of the Aromanian community, Matthew was born in the village Klinovos (now part of Kalabaka), and he became Metropolis of Ioannina. In early 1596, he was elected Ecumenical Patriarch, but the election was not recognized because the Holy Synod that elected him was not attended by all the members; thus, after twenty days, Matthew II was forced to resign and moved to Mount Athos.

Matthew II was elected again in April 1598. During this Patriarchate, Matthew II transferred the patriarchal see from the Church of St. Demetrius Xyloportas, used since 1597, to the unimpressive church of the women's monastery of St. George in the Phanar, where it remains until today as St. George's Cathedral. The Phanar district then became the recognised centre of Greek Christian life in the city. He remained on the throne until January 1602, when he returned to Mount Athos.

Once again, he ascended to the throne in January 1603 and reigned for seventeen days, either until his death, or, according to other sources, until he retired to Mount Athos, where he died in the same year.

== Canonisations ==
Matthew II canonised the Blessed Philothei of Athens, who was martyred in 1589 in Athens.

== Notes and references ==
Eastern Orthodox Church titles
Preceded by Jeremias II (3)	Ecumenical Patriarch of Constantinople; 1596	Succeeded by Gabriel I
Preceded by Meletius I	Ecumenical Patriarch of Constantinople; 1598 – 1602	Succeeded by Neophytus II
Preceded by Neophytus II	Ecumenical Patriarch of Constantinople; 1603	Succeeded by Raphael II
