= Raphael II of Constantinople =

Ecumenical Patriarch of Constantinople from 1603 to 1607

- Ecumenical Patriarch of Constantinople
- Church: Church of Constantinople
- Installed: March 1603
- Term ended: October 1607
- Predecessor: Matthew II of Constantinople
- Successor: Neophytus II of Constantinople
- Previous post: Bishop of Mithymna

Personal details
- Died: After 1607
- Denomination: Eastern Orthodoxy

Raphael II of Constantinople (Greek: Ραφαήλ, Rafail; died after 1607) was Ecumenical Patriarch of Constantinople from 1603 to 1607.

== Life ==
Raphael was Bishop of Mithymna when, in March 1603, he was elected Ecumenical Patriarch of Constantinople. During his patriarchate, he addressed the regulation of many ecclesiastical matters and issued a number of standard provisions. The clashes with the previous Patriarch Neophytus II of Constantinople caused many problems in the Church, to the point that Cyril I of Constantinople, in a letter to the Bishop of Heraclea Dionysius II, wrote that "... Raphael ruled the Patriarchate as a tyrant for more than four years ...".

Raphael II showed interest in a possible union with the Western Church and he began a secret correspondence with the Pope. He remained Patriarch until October 1607, when he was forcibly deposed by Sultan Ahmed I and suffered a violent death in exile.

== Notes and references ==
Eastern Orthodox Church titles
Preceded by Matthew II (3)	Ecumenical Patriarch of Constantinople; 1603 – 1607	Succeeded by Neophytus II (2)
