= Gabriel I of Constantinople =

Ecumenical Patriarch of Constantinople in 1596

- Ecumenical Patriarch of Constantinople
- Church: Church of Constantinople
- In office: March 1596 – August 1596
- Predecessor: Matthew II of Constantinople
- Successor: Theophanes I of Constantinople

Personal details
- Died: 1596
- Denomination: Eastern Orthodoxy

Gabriel I of Constantinople (Greek: Γαβριήλ; died 1596) was Ecumenical Patriarch of Constantinople from March to August 1596. He was previously bishop of Thessaloniki.

== Bibliography ==
- Venance Grumel, Traité d'études byzantines, vol. I - La chronologie, Presses universitaires de France, Paris, 1958.
- Nicolas Viton de Saint-Allais, L'art de vérifier les dates, tome I, Paris, 1818, p. 494.

Eastern Orthodox Church titles
Preceded by Matthew II	Ecumenical Patriarch of Constantinople; 1596	Succeeded by Theophanes I
