= Nicolas Viton de Saint-Allais =

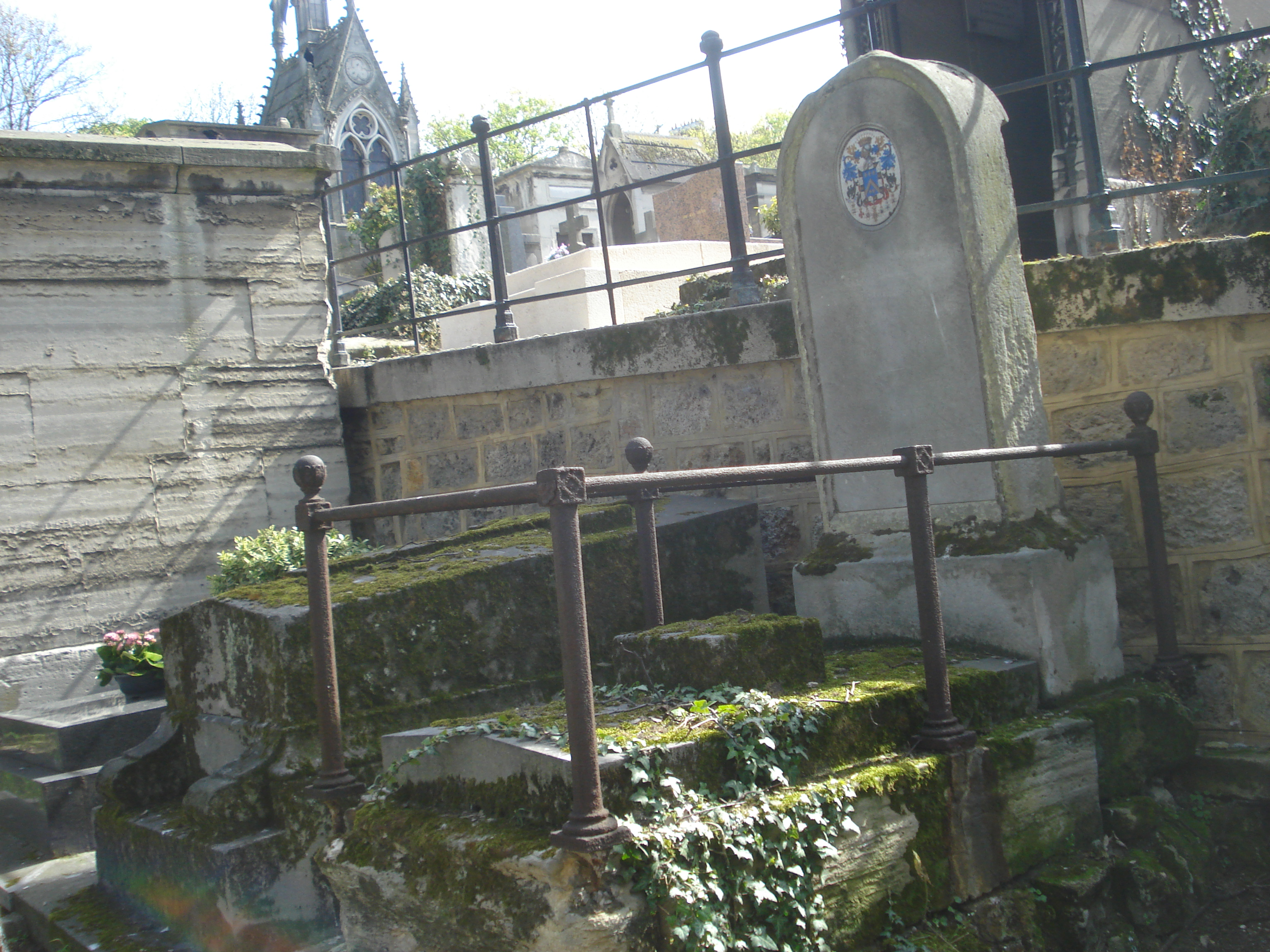
- Grave at the Montparnasse Cemetery
- Born: 6 April 1773; Langres, France
- Died: 1842 (aged 68–69); Paris, France
- Resting place: Paris, Ile-de-France, France
- Occupation: Genealogist
- Children: 1 son

Nicolas Viton de Saint-Allais (6 April 1773 – 1842) was a French genealogist and littérateur.

== Biography ==
=== Early life ===
Nicolas Viton de Saint-Allais was born on 6 April 1773 in Langres, France.

=== Career ===
During the French Revolution, he served as an Assistant to Guillaume Brune. In 1808, he became a genealogist. His genealogical practice was called, "Bureau général de la Noblesse de France" (General Bureau of French Nobility). By 1820, his sold his practice to Jean-Baptiste-Pierre Courcelles.

=== Death and legacy ===
He died in 1842 in Paris. His son went on to serve in the French Foreign Legion.

== Bibliography ==
- The Art of Verifying Dates ( 6 volumes 4to and 23 volumes 8vo 1818–1820)
- De l'ancienne France, Paris: M. de Saint-Allais, 1833
