= Meletius I of Constantinople =

Ecumenical Patriarch of Constantinople from 1597 to 1598

- Ecumenical Patriarch of Constantinople
- Church: Church of Constantinople
- Installed: 30 March 1597
- Term ended: March 1598
- Predecessor: Theophanes I of Constantinople
- Successor: Matthew II of Constantinople
- Other post: Locum tenens (1596 – 1597) of the Ecumenical Patriarchate of Constantinople

Personal details
- Born: Meletius Pigas; 1549 Heraklion, Crete
- Died: 12 September 1601 (aged 51–52) Alexandria, Ottoman Egypt

Sainthood
- Venerated in: Eastern Orthodox Church

Meletius I of Constantinople (Greek: Μελέτιος Πηγᾶς; 1549 – 12 September 1601) served as patriarch of Alexandria between 1590 and 1601. Simultaneously from 1597 to 1598 he served also as locum tenens of the Ecumenical Patriarch of Constantinople. He is honoured as a saint in the Eastern Orthodox Church, with his feast day held on 13 September.

== Life ==
Meletius was born in Candia (Heraklion) in the island of Crete, at the time capital of the Republic of Venice Kingdom of Candia in 1549, and he studied classical philology, philosophy and medicine in Padua. He became protosyncellus of the patriarch of Alexandria Silvester, at whose death he succeeded on 5 August 1590.

He was a fierce opponent of the Catholic Church and worked for the reunion of the Greek Church with the Coptic Church. In 1593, he participated in a synod in Constantinople which confirmed the establishment of the Patriarch of Moscow and all Rus'.

Without resigning as Patriarch of Alexandria, he served as locum tenens of the Ecumenical Patriarchate of Constantinople between December 1596 and February 1597, and Patriarch of Constantinople from 30 March 1597 to March 1598, when he resigned to go on dealing only with his Egyptian see.

He died in Alexandria on 12 September 1601.

== Notes and references ==
Eastern Orthodox Church titles
Preceded by Theophanes I	Ecumenical Patriarch of Constantinople; 1597 – 1598	Succeeded by Matthew II (2)

Preceded by Silvester	Greek Patriarch of Alexandria; 1590–1601	Succeeded by Cyril III
