= List of 17th-century religious leaders =

This is a list of the top-level leaders for religious groups with at least 50,000 adherents, and that led anytime from January 1, 1601, to December 31, 1700. It should also only mention leaders who have been mentioned in other articles and lists.

== Buddhism ==
=== Pure Land Buddhism ===
- Jodo Shinshu (complete list) –

- Hongwanji-ha

- Junnyo, Monshu (1593–1630)
- Ryōnyo, Monshu (1630–1662)
- Jakunyo, Monshu (1662–1725)

- Ōtani-ha

- Kyōnyo, Monshu (1602–1614)
- Sennyo, Monshu (1614–1654)
- Takunyo, Monshu (1654–1664)
- Jōnyo, Monshu (1664–1679)
- Ichinyo, Monshu (1679–1700)
- Shinnyo, Monshu (1700–1744)

=== Tibetan Buddhism ===
- Dalai Lama of the Gelug (Yellow Hat sect) –

- Yonten Gyatso, 4th Dalai Lama (?–1617)
- Ngawang Lobsang Gyatso, 5th Dalai Lama (1618–1682)
- Tsangyang Gyatso, 6th Dalai Lama (1688–1706)

- Panchen Lama of the Gelug (Yellow Hat sect) –

- Lobsang Chökyi Gyalsten, Panchen Lama (1570–1662)
- Lobsang Yeshe, Panchen Lama (1663–1737)

- Tibetan Buddhism, Mongolia –

- Zanabazar Öndur gegeen Luvsadambiyjaltsan, (1635–1723)

- Sakya sect –

- Duchod Labrangpa Jamgon Kunga, Throne holder (1685–1711)

== Christianity ==
=== Catholicism ===
- Roman Catholic Church (complete list) -

- Clement VIII, Pope (1592–1605)
- Leo XI, Pope (1605)
- Paul V, Pope (1605–1621)
- Gregory XV, Pope (1621–1623)
- Urban VIII, Pope (1623–1644)
- Innocent X, Pope (1644–1655)
- Alexander VII, Pope (1655–1667)
- Clement IX, Pope (1667–1669)
- Clement X, Pope (1670–1676)
- Innocent XI, Pope (1676–1689)
- Alexander VIII, Pope (1689–1691)
- Innocent XII, Pope (1691–1700)
- Clement XI, Pope (1700–1721)

=== Eastern Orthodoxy ===
- Ecumenical Patriarchate of Constantinople, the first among equals in Eastern Orthodoxy (complete list) –

- Matthew II, Ecumenical Patriarch (1596, 1598–1602, 1603)
- Neophytus II, Ecumenical Patriarch (1602–1603)
- Raphael II, Ecumenical Patriarch (1603–1607)
- Neophytus II, Ecumenical Patriarch (1607–1612), restored
- Cyril I Lucaris, acting Ecumenical Patriarch (1612)
- Timothy II, Ecumenical Patriarch (1612–1620)
- Cyril I Lucaris, Ecumenical Patriarch (1620–1623), restored 1st time
- Gregory IV, Ecumenical Patriarch (1623)
- Anthimus II, Ecumenical Patriarch (1623)
- Cyril I Lucaris, Ecumenical Patriarch (1623–1633), restored 2nd time
- Cyril II Kontares, Ecumenical Patriarch (1633)
- Cyril I Lucaris, Ecumenical Patriarch (1633–1634), restored 3rd time
- Athanasius III Patelaros, Ecumenical Patriarch (1634)
- Cyril I Lucaris, Ecumenical Patriarch (1634–1635), restored 4th time
- Cyril II Kontares, Ecumenical Patriarch (1635–1636), restored 1st time
- Neophytus III of Nicea, Ecumenical Patriarch (1636–1637)
- Cyril I Lucaris, Ecumenical Patriarch (1637–1638) restored 5th time
- Cyril II Kontares, Ecumenical Patriarch (1638–1639), restored 2nd time
- Parthenius I, Ecumenical Patriarch (1639–1644)
- Parthenius II, Ecumenical Patriarch (1644–1646)
- Joannicius II, Ecumenical Patriarch (1646–1648)
- Parthenius II, Ecumenical Patriarch (1648–1651), restored
- Joannicius II, Ecumenical Patriarch (1651–1652), restored 1st time
- Cyril III, Ecumenical Patriarch (1652–1652)
- Athanasius III, Ecumenical Patriarch (1652), restored
- Paisius I, Ecumenical Patriarch (1652–1653）
- Joannicius II, Ecumenical Patriarch (1653–1654), restored 2nd time
- Cyril III, Ecumenical Patriarch (1654), restored
- Joannicius II, Ecumenical Patriarch (1655–1656), restored 3rd time
- Parthenius III, Ecumenical Patriarch (1656–1657)
- Gabriel II, Ecumenical Patriarch (1657)
- Parthenius IV, Ecumenical Patriarch (1657–1659)
- Theophanes II, Ecumenical Patriarch (1659)
- vacant, Ecumenical Patriarch (1659–1662)
- Dionysius III, Ecumenical Patriarch (1662–1665)
- Parthenius IV, Ecumenical Patriarch (1665–1667), restored 1st time
- Clement, Ecumenical Patriarch (1667)
- Methodius III, Ecumenical Patriarch (1668–1671)
- Parthenius IV, Ecumenical Patriarch (1671), restored 2nd time
- Dionysius IV Muselimes, Ecumenical Patriarch (the Muslim), Ecumenical Patriarch (1671–1673)
- Gerasimus II, Ecumenical Patriarch (1673–1674)
- Parthenius IV, Ecumenical Patriarch (1675–1676) restored 3rd time
- Dionysius IV Muselimes (the Muslim), Ecumenical Patriarch (1676–1679), restored 1st time
- Athanasius IV, Ecumenical Patriarch (1679)
- James, Ecumenical Patriarch (1679–1682)
- Dionysius IV Muselimes (the Muslim), Ecumenical Patriarch (1682–1684), restored 2nd time
- Parthenius IV, Ecumenical Patriarch (1684–1685) restored 4th time
- James, Ecumenical Patriarch (1685–1686), restored 1st time
- Dionysius IV Muselimes (the Muslim), Ecumenical Patriarch (1686–1687), restored 3rd time
- James, Ecumenical Patriarch (1687–1688), restored 2nd time
- Callinicus II, Ecumenical Patriarch (1688, 1689–1693, 1694–1702)
- Neophytus IV, Ecumenical Patriarch (1688)
- Dionysius IV Muselimes (the Muslim), Ecumenical Patriarch (1693–1694), restored 4th time

- Patriarchate of Alexandria -

- Gerasimos II, Pope and Patriarch (1688–1710)

- Patriarchate of Antioch -

- Athanasios III (1st time), Patriarch (1686–1694)
- Athanasios III, Patriarch (1720–1724)

- Patriarchate of Jerusalem -

- Dositheos II, Patriarch (1669–1707)

- Russian Orthodox Church (complete list) -

- Adrian I, Patriarch of Moscow and All Russia (1690–1700)
- Trifily of Krutitsy, Patriarch of Moscow and All Russia (1700–1701)

- Serbian Orthodox Church -

- Jovan Kantul, Serbian Patriarch (1592–1613)
- Pajsije Janjevac, Serbian Patriarch (1614–1647)
- Gavrilo I, Serbian Patriarch (1648–1655)
- Maksim I, Serbian Patriarch (1655–1674)
- Arsenije III Crnojević, Serbian Patriarch (1674–1706), after 1690 in Habsburg monarchy
- Kalinik I Skopljanac, Serbian Patriarch (1691–1710)

- Serbian Orthodox Church in Habsburg monarchy -

- Arsenije III Crnojević, Serbian Patriarch (1674–1706), since 1690 in Habsburg monarchy

- Romanian Orthodox Church -

- Theodosios, Metropolitan of Hungaro-Walachia (1679–1708)

- Bulgarian Orthodox Church -

- Theodosios, Metropolitan of Turnovo (1697–?)

- Georgian Orthodox Church -

- Ioan VII, Catholicos-Patriarch of Iberia (1696–1700)
- Evdemoz II, Catholicos-Patriarch of Iberia (1700–1703)

- Orthodox Church of Cyprus -

- Germanos II, Archbishop of Nea Justiniana and All Cypru (1694–1705)

- Orthodox Church of Greece -

- Kyrillos II, Metropolitan of Athens (1699–1703)

- Albanian Orthodox Church -

- Kosmas, Metropolitan of Durrë (1694–1702)

- Orthodox Church of Mount Sinai -

- Ioannikios I, Archbishop of Sinai (1671–1702)

- Ukrainian Orthodox Church -

- Varlaam I, Metropolitan of Kiev (1690–1707)

- Orthodox Church of Macedonia -

- Raphail, Archbishop of Ohrid (1699–1702)

=== Oriental Orthodoxy ===
- Armenian Apostolic Church -

- Nahapet I, Catholicose of All Armenian (1691–1705)

- Eremia II, Catholicose of Aluank' (1676–1701)

- Armenian Apostolic Church -

- Matevos I, Catholicose of Cilicia (1694–1705)

- Coptic Orthodox Church -

- Gabriel VIII, Pope and Patriarch (1587–1603)
- vacant (1603–1610)
- Mark V, Pope and Patriarch (1610–1621)
- John XV, Pope and Patriarch (1621–1631)
- Matthew III, Pope and Patriarch (1631–1645)
- Mark VI, Pope and Patriarch (1645–1660)
- Matthew IV, Pope and Patriarch (1660–1676)
- John XVI, Pope and Patriarch (1676–1718)

- Ethiopian Church -

- Petros, Metropolitan of Ethiopia (1599?–1607)
- Simon, Metropolitan of Ethiopia (1608–1617)
- Afonso Mendes (1622–1632), Catholic Patriarch, supported by Susenyos I and deposed by Fasilides
- vacant (1632–1633)
- Rezek, Metropolitan of Ethiopia (c. 1634)
- Marqos (c. 1635–1672) and Krestodolos II (c. 1640–1672), both serving as Metropolitans of Ethiopia
- Sinoda, Metropolitan of Ethiopia (1672–1687)
- vacant (1687–1689)
- Marqos, Metropolitan of Ethiopia (1689–late 17th century)
- Marqos X, Metropolitan of Ethiopia (1694–1716)

- Syriac Orthodox Church -

- Ignatius George II, Patriarch of Antioch and All the East (1687–1708)

=== Protestantism ===
==== Lutheran ====
- Swedish Church -

- Olaus Swebilius, Archbishop of Uppsala (1681–1700)
- Eric Benzelius, Archbishop of Uppsala (1700–1709)

==== Anglicanism ====
- Church of England

- Formal leadership: Supreme Governor of the Church of England (complete list) –

- Elizabeth I, Supreme Governor (1559–1603)
- James I, Supreme Governor (1603–1625)
- Charles I, Supreme Governor (1625–1649)
- Oliver Cromwell, Supreme Governor (1653–1658)
- Richard Cromwell, Supreme Governor (1658–1659)
- Charles II, Supreme Governor (1660–1685)
- James II, Supreme Governor (1685–1688)
- Mary II, co-Supreme Governor (1689–1694)
- William III, co-Supreme Governor (1689–1694), Supreme Governor (1694–1702)

- Effective leadership: Archbishops of Canterbury (complete list) –

- John Whitgift, Archbishop (1583–1604)
- Richard Bancroft, Archbishop (1604–1610)
- George Abbot, Archbishop (1611–1633)
- William Laud, Archbishop (1633–1645)
- William Juxon, Archbishop (1660–1663)
- Gilbert Sheldon, Archbishop (1663–1677)
- William Sancroft, Archbishop (1678–1690)
- John Tillotson, Archbishop (1691–1694)
- Thomas Tenison, Archbishop (1695–1715)

=== Other Christian or Christian-derived faiths ===
- Assyrian Church of the East, line 1 -

- Eliyya X Yohannan Marogin, Patriarch (1660–1700)
- Eliyya XI Marogin, Patriarch (1700–1722)

- Assyrian Church of the East, line 2 -

- Shimoun XIII Dinkha, Patriarch (1692–1700)
- Shimoun XIV Sleman, Patriarch (1700–1740)

== Islam ==
=== Sunni ===
- Ottoman Empire, (complete list) -

- Mehmed III, Caliph (1595–1603)
- Ahmed I, Caliph (1603–1617)
- Mustafa I, Caliph (1617–1618, 1622–1623)
- Osman II, Caliph (1618–1622)
- Murad IV, Caliph (1623–1640)
- Ibrahim I, Caliph (1640–1648)
- Mehmed IV, Caliph (1648–1687)
- Suleiman II, Caliph (1687–1691)
- Ahmed II, Caliph (1691–1695)
- Mustafa II, Caliph (1695–1703)

=== Shia ===
- Twelver Islam

- Imams (complete list) –

- Muhammad al-Mahdi, Imam (874–present) Shia belief holds that he was hidden by Allah in 874.

- Nizari Isma'ilism (complete list) –

- Khalil Allah I, Imam (1574–1634)
- Nur ad-Dahr, Imam (1634–1671)
- Khalilullah II Ali, Imam (1671–1680)
- Shah Nizar II, Imam (1680–1722)

- Zaidiyyah (complete list) –

- al-Mansur al-Qasim, Imam (1597–1620)
- al-Mu'ayyad Muhammad, Imam (1620–1644)
- al-Mutawakkil Isma'il, Imam (1644–1676)
- al-Mahdi Ahmad, Imam (1676–1681)
- al-Mu'ayyad Muhammad II, Imam (1681–1686)
- al-Mahdi Muhammad, Imam (1687–1718)

- Mumini (complete list) –

- Sadr al-Din Muhammad bin Haydar, Imam (1586–1622)
- Mu'in al-Din bin Sadr al-Din, Imam (1622–1644)
- Atiyyat Allah bin Muin al-Din, Imam (1644–1663)
- Aziz Shah bin Atiyyat Allah, Imam (1663–1691)
- Mu'in al-Din II bin 'Aziz Shah, Imam (1691–1715)

- Dawoodi Bohra (complete list) –

- Dawood Bin Qutubshah, Da'i al-Mutlaq (1591–1612)
- Sheikh Adam Safiuddin, Da'i al-Mutlaq (1612–1622)
- Abduttayyeb Zakiuddin, Da'i al-Mutlaq (1622–1633)
- Ali Shamshuddin Bin Moulai Hasan, Da'i al-Mutlaq (1633–1634)
- Kasim Khan Zainuddin, Da'i al-Mutlaq (1634–1646)
- Qutubuddin Shaheed, Da'i al-Mutlaq (1646–1648)
- Feer Khan Shujauddin, Da'i al-Mutlaq (1648–1657)
- Ismail Badruddin I, Da'i al-Mutlaq (1657–1676)
- Abduttayyeb Zakiuddin II, Da'i al-Mutlaq (1676–1692)
- Musa Kalimuddin, Da'i al-Mutlaq (1692–1711)

== Judaism and related ==
- Western Europe –

- Menasseh Ben Israel (died 1657)
- David Pardo (Dutch rabbi, born at Salonica) (died 1657)
- David Pardo (Dutch rabbi, born in Amsterdam)
- Saul Levi Morteira (died 1660)
- Isaac Aboab da Fonseca (died 1693)
- Yair Bacharach (died 1702)
- Abraham ben Saul Broda (died 1717)
- Tzvi Ashkenazi (died 1718)
- Naphtali Cohen (died 1718)
- Samuel Schotten (died 1719)
- David Nieto (died 1728)

- Ottoman Empire –

- Hayim Kamhi, Chief Rabbi (1677–1715)

== See also ==
- List of 16th-century religious leaders
- List of 18th-century religious leaders
- List of state leaders in the 17th century
- List of governors of dependent territories in the 17th century
