= Ismail Badruddin I =

34th Da'i al-Multaq of the Dawoodi Bohras

Syedna Ismail Badruddin 34th Da'i al-Mutlaq of the Dawoodi Bohra
- اسمعيل بَدرالدين

Da'i al-Mutlaq
- In office 1657 AD (1065 AH) – 1676 AD (1085 AH)
- Preceded by: Feer Khan Shujauddin
- Succeeded by: Abduttayyeb Zakiuddin II
- Title: Syedna; Maulana; al-Dā'ī al-Mutlaq; al-Dā'ī al-Ajal al-Fātimi

Personal life
- Born: 1582 AD (990 AH) Jamnagar, India
- Died: 1676 AD (1085 AH)
- Resting place: Jamnagar, India
- Spouse: Boodi Bai
- Children: Syedna Abduttayyeb Zakiuddin II
- Parent: Maulaya Raj (father)

Religious life
- Religion: Islam
- Sect: Isma'ili; Dawoodi Bohra
- Jurisprudence: Mustaali; Tayyabi

Syedna Ismail Badruddin (I) Bin Maulaya Raj (died on 23rd Jumada al-Akhirah 1085 AH/1676 AD, Jamnagar, India) was the 34th Da'i al-Mutlaq of the Dawoodi Bohras. He succeeded the 33rd Da'i Feer Khan Shujauddin to the religious post. Syedna Ismail became Da'i al-Mutlaq in 1085AH/1657AD. His period of Dawat was 1065–1085 AH/1657–1676 AD. He is the first Da'i descendant of Moulaya Bharmal.

== Early life ==
Ismail Badruddin was born in Jamnagar, in the Kathiawar Peninsula of the modern Indian state of Gujarat, in 990 H/1582 AD. He was the first Dai al-Mutlaq from the line of the royal Rajput vizier Raja Bharmal, who (along with his brother, Raja Tarmal) had become Muslim at the hands of Maulaya Ahmad and Maulaya Abdullah, Du'aat sent to India from Cairo by the 18th Imam Al-Mustansir Billah. They had taken knowledge and trained for this khidmat by Syedna Al-Mu'ayyad fi'l-Din al-Shirazi, the Bab-ul-Abwab of Mustansir Imam.

His full genealogy is as follows: Ismail Badruddin, son of Maulaya Raj, son of Maulaya Adam, son of Maulaya Dawood, son of Maulaya Raja, son of Maulaya Ali, son of Maulaya Isḥāq, son of Maulaya Ya’qub, son of Raja Bharmal. His grandfather, Maulaya Adam, had made Jamnagar his home, and his father, Maulaya Raj, had established a large trading business there. Previously, Maulaya Raja had settled in Morbi, and earlier, his forefathers had lived in Patan.

== Education ==
Badruddin’s father, Maulaya Raj, brought him to Ahmedabad, to the presence of the 27th Da'i Dawood Bin Qutubshah, when he was twelve years old. Dawood asked Maulaya Raj about the child, and Maulaya Raj replied that he was his fifth son. He said to Maulaya Raj, “You have conscientiously offered me a fifth of your wealth, but you have yet to offer me the fifth share of your sons.” Maulaya Raj was delighted at this request, and happily gave charge of the young Ismail to Dawood (Khumus). Dawood personally undertook Ismail’s education. For many years thereafter, Ismail lived for eight months in Ahmedabad and returned to Jamnagar for the remaining four.

== Marriage ==
Maulaya Raj performed Ismail’s marriage to a pious lady named Boodi Bai. She gave birth to Ismail Badruddin’s son and successor, Syedna Abduttayyeb Zakiyuddin II.

== Before Dai's position ==
Ismail Badruddin served seven Da'is (27th to 33rd); Dawood bin QutubShah, Shaikh-Adam Safiyuddin, Abduttayyeb Zakiyuddin I, Ali Shamsuddin, Qasim-Khan Zainuddin, Qutub-Khan Qutbuddin, and Feer-Khan Shujauddin. One of his achievements was the repayment of a major loan in the time of Qasim-Khan Zainuddin. At the time of a drought in Gujarat, Badruddin also sent cart loads of rice to the Dai in Ahmedabad for mumineen. Over these years, due to the excellence and sincerity of Syedna Ismail Badruddin and the jealousy and scheming of certain people, Badruddin endured a number of serious trials. As a result of the scheming, on two occasions, an envoy was sent by the Dai of the time to inquire about the serious and false allegations made against Badruddin. Even in the face of such animosity, Badruddin remained steadfast.

== After Dai's position ==
When Badruddin became Dai, he established a well-ordered institution of learning in Jamnagar. Badruddin himself taught these students many Dawat books. Around thirty students came to study full time with Badruddin.

Badruddin was seventy-five when he became Dai. Despite his advanced age, he led for 20 years.

== Death ==
He died on 23 Jumada al-Akhirah 1085 H/1674 AD at the age of ninety five. The Mazar-e-Badri in Jamnagar is the holy mausoleum where Syedna Ismail Badruddin is buried.

[[

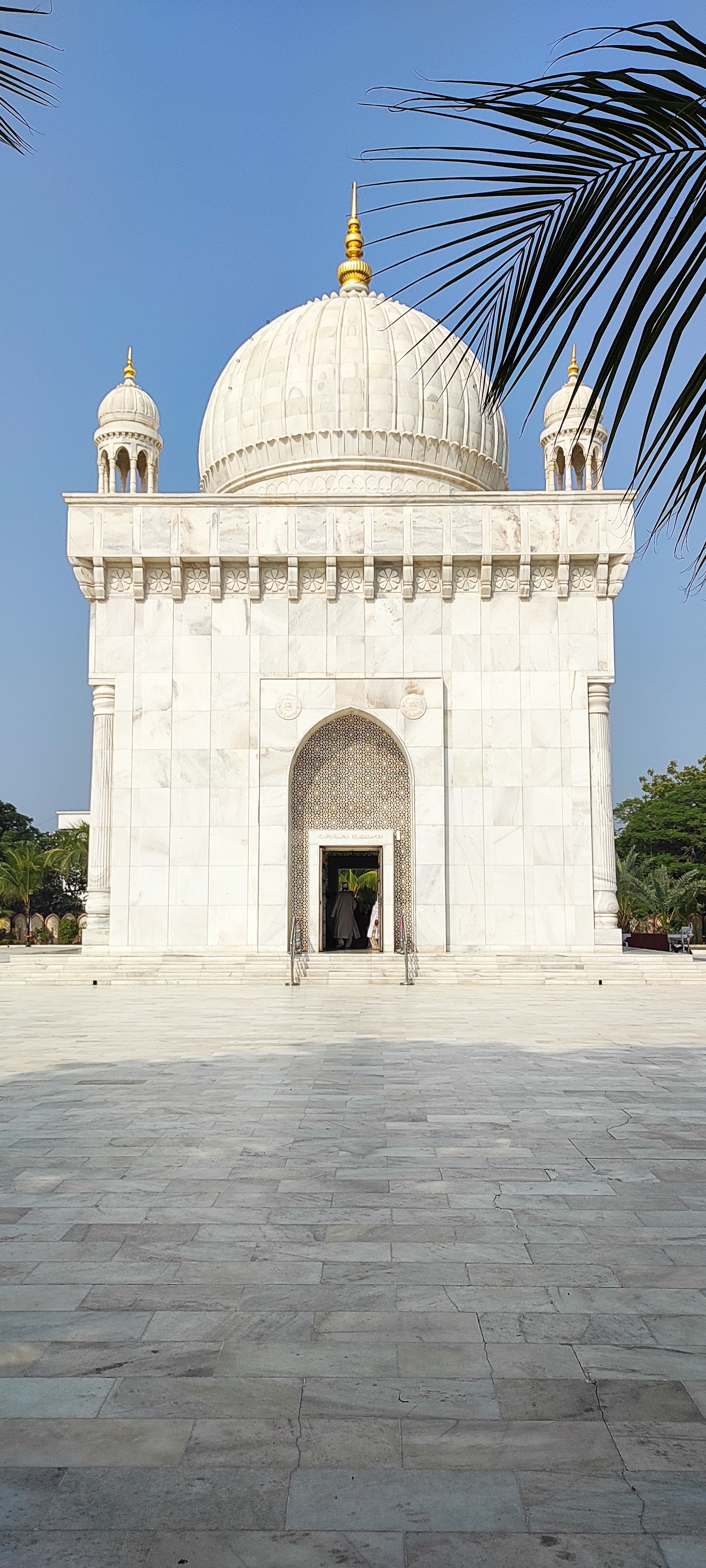
Syedna Ismail Badruddin (II) Bin Syedi Sheikh Adam (died on 7 Moharram 1150 H (1738 AD) in Jamnagar, India) was the 38th Dā'ī of the Dawoodi Bohras

|thumb]]]

Shia Islam titles
Ismail Badruddin I Dā'ī al-Mutlaq Born: 1582 AD (990 AH) Jamnagar Died: 1676 AD (1085 AH)
Preceded by Feer Khan Shujauddin	34th Dā'ī al-Mutlaq; 1065–1085 AH/1657–1676 AD	Succeeded by Abduttayyeb Zakiuddin II
