= St. George's Cathedral, Istanbul =

Church in Istanbul, Turkey

St. George's Church
- St. George's Patriarchal Temple
- Πατριαρχικός Ναός του Αγίου Γεωργίου (Greek); Aya Yorgi Kilisesi (Turkish)
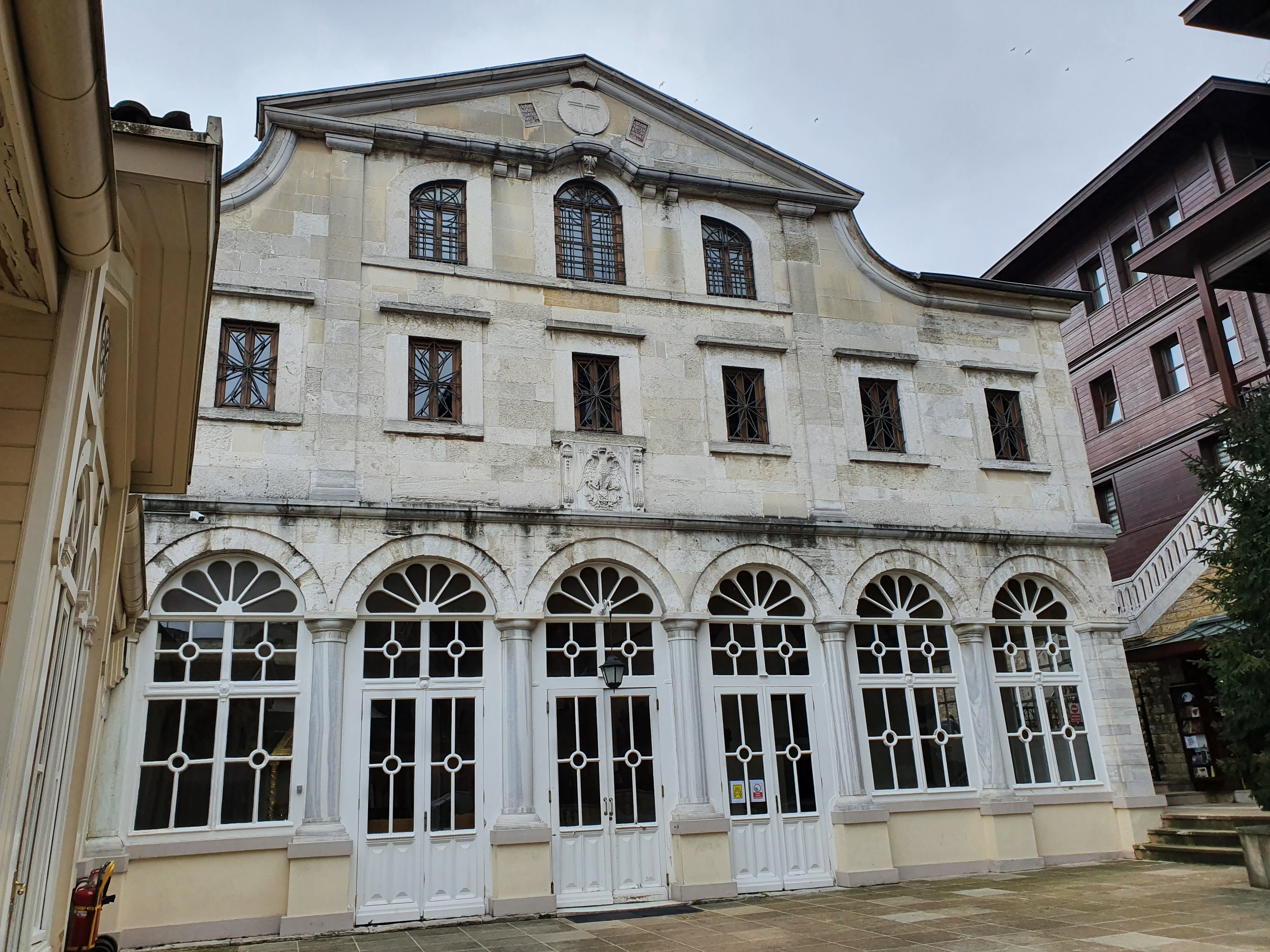

- Location in Istanbul
- 41°01′45″N 28°57′07″E
- Location: Fener, Istanbul, Turkey
- Denomination: Eastern Orthodox Church
- Tradition: Byzantine Rite
- Website: ec-patr.org

History
- Dedication: Saint George

Architecture
- Designated: around 1600
- Style: Neoclassical Architecture

Clergy
- Archbishop: Bartholomew I of Constantinople

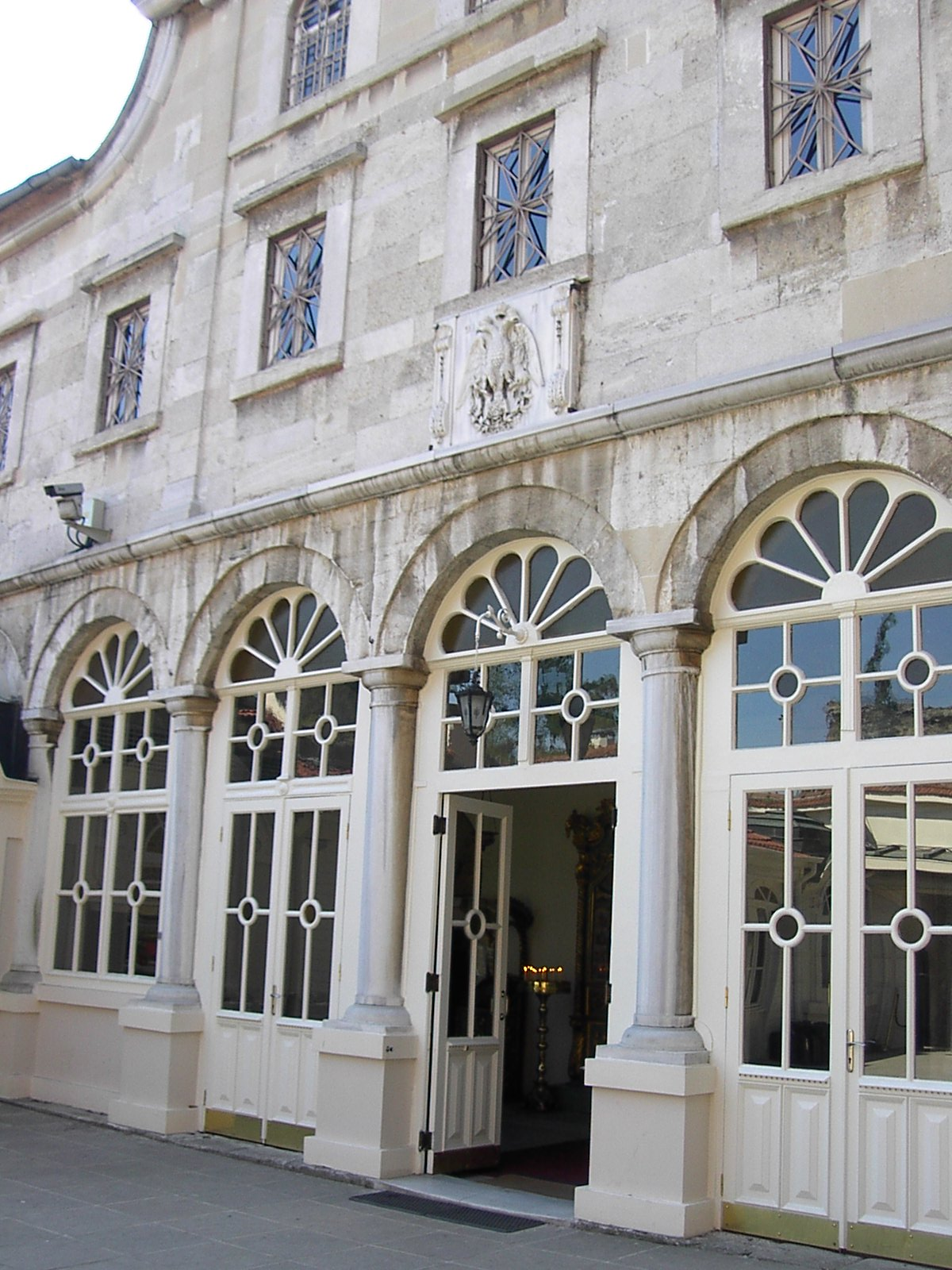
The exterior of the Church of St George. The façade dates from the mid-19th century and shows a neo-Classical influence that makes it quite distinct from Orthodox churches in the Byzantine style.

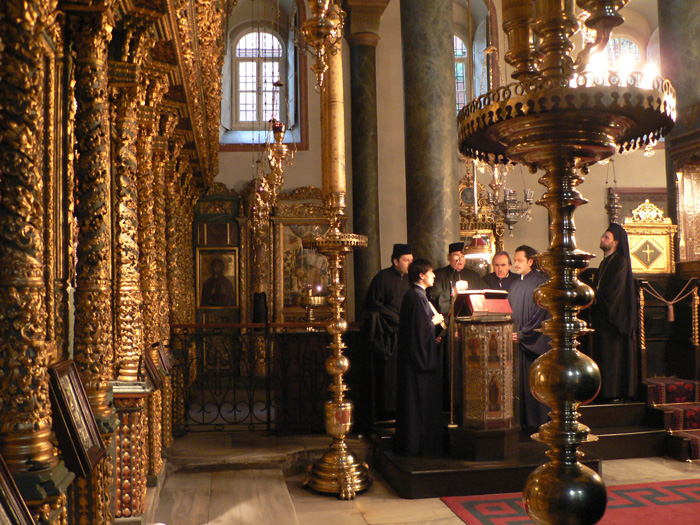
Inside the Patriarchal Basilica of St George in Fener (Phanar)

The Patriarchal Cathedral Church of St. George (Greek: Πατριαρχικός Ναός του Αγίου Γεωργίου; Turkish: Aya Yorgi Kilisesi) is the principal Eastern Orthodox cathedral located in Istanbul, Turkey, formerly Constantinople. Since about 1600, it has been the seat of the Ecumenical Patriarchate of Constantinople whose leader is regarded as the primus inter pares (first among equals) in the Eastern Orthodox Church, and is frequently looked upon as the spiritual leader of the 300 million Orthodox Christians worldwide. (Note: See:)

== Location and architecture ==
The church is located in the Fener (Phanar) district of Istanbul, northwest of the historic centre of old Constantinople. (Its address is Dr Sadık Ahmet Caddesi No 19, Fener 34083, Fatih-Istanbul.) Because of this, "Phanar" is often used as a metaphor or shorthand for the Ecumenical Patriarchate of Constantinople. It is a relatively small church, especially so considering its status in world Christianity. This, however, can be explained by the Islamic laws of the Ottoman Empire that governed the rights of dhimmis, which stipulate that all non-Islamic buildings must be smaller and humbler than corresponding Islamic buildings such as mosques: prior to the Ottoman conquest of Constantinople in 1453, the Patriarchal cathedral was Hagia Sophia (also known as the Cathedral of the Holy Wisdom).

The church is open to the public from 8.00 am to 4.30 pm, but strict security screening is in place. It is visited by a stream of pilgrims from Greece, other Orthodox countries and by tourists. Behind the church are the offices of the Patriarchate and the Patriarchate Library. The church, which was part of a convent or monastery before becoming the seat of the Patriarch, is outwardly modest, but its interior is lavishly decorated.

The church, dedicated to the Christian martyr Saint George, is the site of numerous important services, and is where the patriarch will consecrate the chrism (myron) on Holy and Great Thursday, when needed. For this reason, the church is also known as the "Patriarchal Church of the Great Myrrh". At one time, the patriarch would consecrate all of the chrism used throughout the entire Orthodox Church. However, the heads of most of the autocephalous churches now sanctify their own myrrh.

== History ==
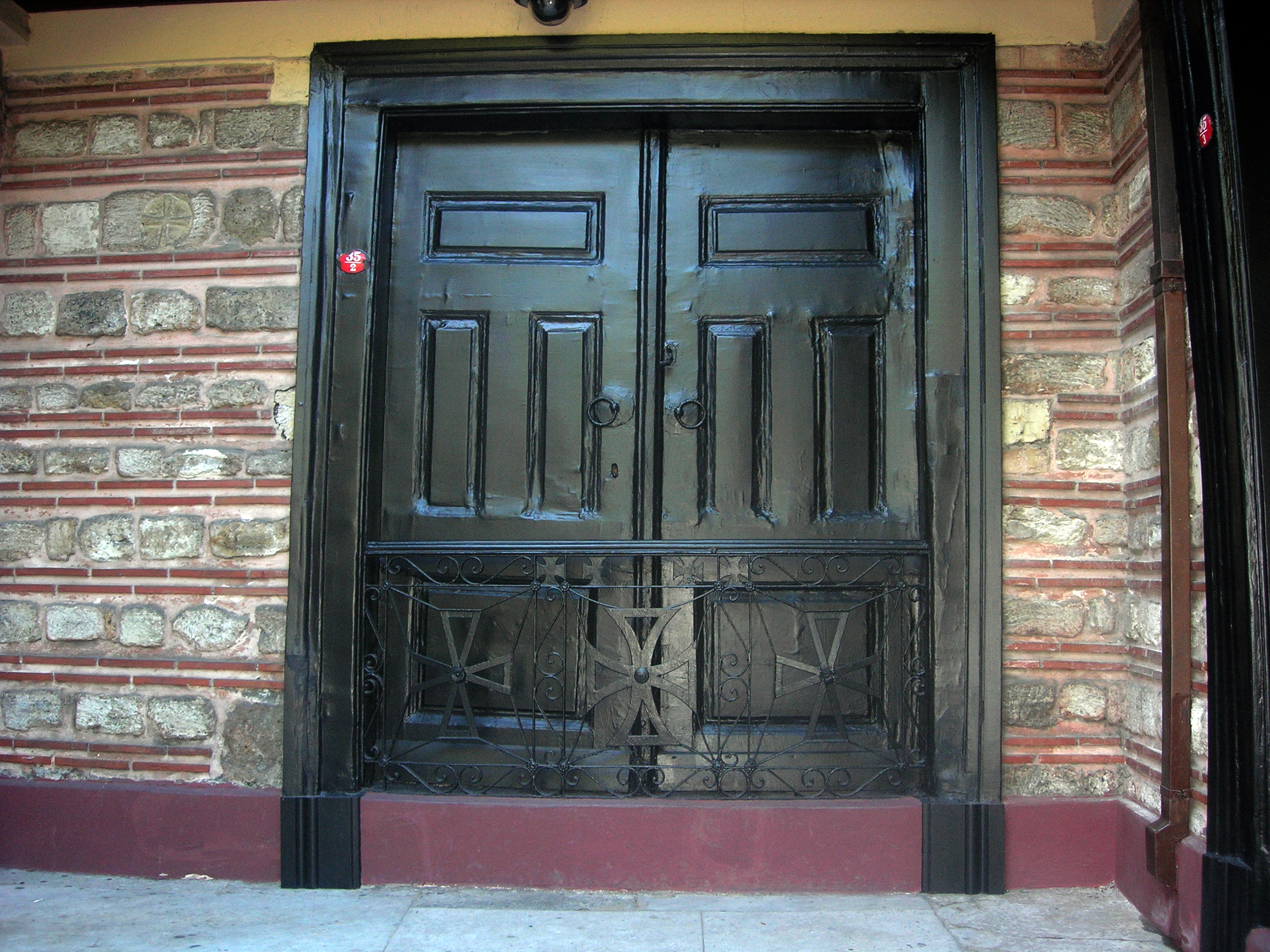
Saint Peter's Gate at the Patriarchate. In 1821, Patriarch Gregory V remained hanged for multiple days at its architrave, because he was blamed by Mahmud II for his inability to suppress the Greek War of Independence. The Gate has not been opened since.

Since the Fall of Constantinople in 1453, the city later known as Istanbul had been in the hands of the Ottoman Turks. Matthew II (1596–1603) moved the Patriarchate to the former convent of St George in the Phanar in 1597. The Phanar district became the recognized centre of Greek Christian life in the city.

The church has been reconstructed many times, and little remains of its original structure. Patriarch Timothy II (1612–1620) rebuilt and enlarged the church in 1614. It was again reconstructed under Patriarch Callinicus II of Constantinople (1694–1702). In the early 18th century (sources vary on the exact date) the church was badly damaged by fire. In 1720 Patriarch Jeremias III (1716–1726, 1732–1733), wrote to Neophytos, Metropolitan of Arta: "By the mercy and will of the All-Good God, the lords, may God grant them long life, were moved and they gave us permission to rebuild from the very foundations the holy church of our Patriarchal and Ecumenical Throne, and so we have started this building with the help of God." The restoration works of Jeremias III were continued by Patriarch Paisius II (Patriarch several times between 1726 and 1752).

There was another great fire in 1738, when the church again suffered severe damage. It was not until 1797 that Patriarch Gregory V was able to begin large-scale restoration work. The current state of the church largely dates from this rebuilding. The church has the plan of a three-aisled basilica with three semicircular apses on the east side and a transverse narthex on the west. The interior is divided into three aisles by colonnades, with the tall pews of ebony wood placed along the line of the columns. This arrangement leaves ample space in the nave for the performance of the liturgy. In the holy bema, behind the altar, the synthrone (cathedra) is arranged in a semicircle along the curved wall of the apse, with seats for the Archpriests and a central higher throne of marble for the Patriarch.

Further changes were made to the church under Patriarch Gregory VI (1835–1840) when the roof was raised to its present height. From this restoration dates the neo-Classical marble doorway with the ornamental door-frames, which makes the front exterior of the church look rather unlike most other Orthodox churches, which are usually designed in the Byzantine style. The last major rebuilding was carried out by the Patriarch Joachim III (1878–1912). The marble pavement of the sanctuary was replaced, the synthrone was renovated, marble caskets were made for the depositing of the relics, the icon-frames were repaired and the ecclesiastical collection was enriched with liturgical vessels and vestments, all donated by Orthodox Christians, mostly from outside the Ottoman Empire.

The church was again damaged by a fire in 1941 and for political reasons, it was not fully restored until 1991. Its most precious objects, saved from each successive fire, are the patriarchal throne, which is believed to date from the 5th century, and some rare mosaic icons and the relics of Saints Basil the Great, Gregory the Theologian and John Chrysostom. Some of the bones of these two saints, which were looted from Constantinople by the Fourth Crusade in 1204, were returned to the Church of St George by Pope John Paul II in 2004.

On 3 December 1997, a bomb attack seriously injured a deacon and damaged the Patriarchal church. This was one of the many terrorist attacks against the Ecumenical Patriarchate, its churches and cemeteries in Istanbul in the 20th century.

Since the fall of the Ottomans and the rise of modern Turkish nationalism, most of the Greek Orthodox population of Istanbul was deported or forced to emigrate after a series of minor or major violent incidents like the Istanbul pogrom (1955), leaving the Patriarch in the anomalous position of a leader without a flock, at least locally. In the 21st century, the Church of St George serves mainly as the symbolic centre of the Ecumenical Patriarchate, and as a centre of pilgrimage for Orthodox Christians. The church is financially supported by donations from Orthodox communities in other countries.

== See also ==
- Saint George in devotions, traditions and prayers
