= Patriarch Cyril IV =

Patriarch Cyril IV may refer to:

- Patriarch Cyril IV of Constantinople, patriarch in 1711–1713
- Pope Cyril IV of Alexandria, Pope of Alexandria & Patriarch of the See of St. Mark in 1854–1861
