= Jeremias III of Constantinople =

Ecumenical Patriarch of Constantinople from 1716 to 1726 and from 1732 to 1733

- Ecumenical Patriarch of Constantinople
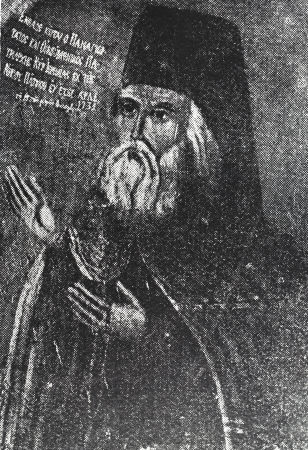
- Church: Church of Constantinople
- In office: 23 March 1716 – 19 November 1726; 15 September 1732 – March 1733
- Predecessor: Cosmas III of Constantinople; Paisius II of Constantinople
- Successor: Callinicus III of Constantinople; Seraphim I of Constantinople
- Previous post: Bishop of Caesarea in Cappadocia

Personal details
- Born: c. 1650/1660 Patmos, Greece
- Died: 1735 Mount Athos, Greece
- Denomination: Eastern Orthodoxy

Jeremias III of Constantinople (Greek: Ἰερεμίας; c. 1650/1660 – 1735) was Ecumenical Patriarch of Constantinople twice, in 1716–1726 and 1732–1733.

== Life ==
Jeremias was born between 1650 and 1660 in the island of Patmos, where he was ordained deacon. He served as a priest in Halki and then in the Diocese of Caesarea in Cappadocia. When his Metropolitan Cyprianus of Constantinople became Patriarch of Constantinople in 1707, he succeeded him as Metropolitan of Cesarea.

Jeremiah was elected Patriarch for the first time on 23 March 1716. His first patriarchate was long compared to the usual length of his office in that century, and Jeremias III succeeded to cope with two attempts of deposition, probably sprung from his support to the Russian Tsardom, on 1 January 1718 the Metropolitan of Pruoza, Cyril, was elected Patriarch in his place, but Jeremias III returned on the throne next 17 January, and in 1720 he was arrested and his rival, the previous Patriarch Cyril IV of Constantinople, reigned from 10 to 22 January, when Jeremias III was re-installed. Jeremiah III was finally deposed on 19 November 1726 after his clashes with the ruler of Moldova Grigore II Ghica concerning his refusal to grant divorce to Ghica's brother, and he was exiled to Mount Sinai.

In 1732, Jeremiah III returned from exile and on 15 September 1732 he was appointed Patriarch for the second time, but after only a few months, in March 1733, he had to leave the throne because he suffered of hemiplegia, and he retired in Great Lavra Monastery on Mount Athos, where he died in 1735.

== Patriarchate ==
Asked by the Tsar Peter the Great about the validity of the Baptisms celebrated by Protestants, on 31 August 1718 Jeremias III confirmed that, as his predecessor Cyprianus stated about the Catholic baptism, it is not necessary to re-baptise the Protestants who joined the Orthodox Church, the Chrismation being enough.

In 1720, he got permission from the Sultan to rebuild a new, larger and brighter Orthodox Patriarchal Cathedral of St. George, destroyed by fire some years before, at the headquarters of the Patriarchate at the Fener. He also reorganized the Monastery of the Transfiguration on the Princes' Islands, which was enriched with a collection of valuable pictures that had been donated by Peter the Great of Russia.

In December 1723, Jeremias III approved the suppression, made in 1721 by Peter the Great of Russia, of Patriarchate of Moscow and its replacement with the Most Holy Synod.

After that the Melkites of Damascus elected the pro-Westerner Cyril VI Tanas as the new Patriarch of Antioch, Jeremias III declared Cyril VI Tanas' election to be invalid, excommunicated him, and appointed the young monk Sylvester of Antioch as new Patriarch of Antioch. Jeremias III consecrated Sylvester as bishop in Constantinople on 8 October 1724. These events split the Melkite Church between the Melkite Greek Catholic Church and the Greek Orthodox Patriarchate of Antioch.

Jeremias III imposed austerity at the expense of the Patriarchate, thus managing to reduce debt and improve its financial situation.

== Notes and references ==
Eastern Orthodox Church titles
Preceded by Cosmas III	Ecumenical Patriarch of Constantinople; 1716 – 1726	Succeeded by Callinicus III
Preceded by Paisius II	Ecumenical Patriarch of Constantinople; 1732 – 1733	Succeeded by Seraphim I
