= Patriarch Seraphim of Constantinople =

Patriarch Seraphim of Constantinople may refer to:

- Seraphim I of Constantinople, Ecumenical Patriarch in 1733–1734
- Seraphim II of Constantinople, Ecumenical Patriarch in 1757–1761
