= Athanasius IV =

Athanasius IV may refer to:

- Athanasius IV Salhoyo, Syriac Patriarch of Antioch (r. 986–1002)
- Patriarch Athanasius IV of Alexandria, Greek Orthodox Patriarch of Alexandria (r. 1417–1425)
- Athanasius IV of Constantinople, Ecumenical Patriarch of Constantinople in 1679
- Athanasius IV Jawhar, Greek Catholic Patriarch of Antioch (r. 1788–1794)
