= Athanasius V =

Athanasius V may refer to:

- Athanasius V Matar, Patriarch of the Melkite Greek Catholic Church in 1813
- Athanasius V Yahyo (1057/1058–1062/1064), Syriac Patriarch of Antioch
- Athanasius V of Constantinople, Ecumenical Patriarch of Constantinople in 1709–1711
- Athanasius V of Jerusalem, Greek Orthodox Patriarchs of Jerusalem in 1827–1844
