= Patriarch Gerasimus of Constantinople =

Patriarch Gerasimus of Constantinople may refer to:

- Gerasimus I of Constantinople, Ecumenical Patriarch in 1320–1321
- Gerasimus II of Constantinople, Ecumenical Patriarch in 1673–1674
- Gerasimus III of Constantinople, Ecumenical Patriarch in 1794–1797
