= Feer Khan Shujauddin =

Syedna Feer-Khan Shujauddin 33rd Da'i al-Mutlaq of the Dawoodi Bohra
- فيرخان شُجاع الدّين
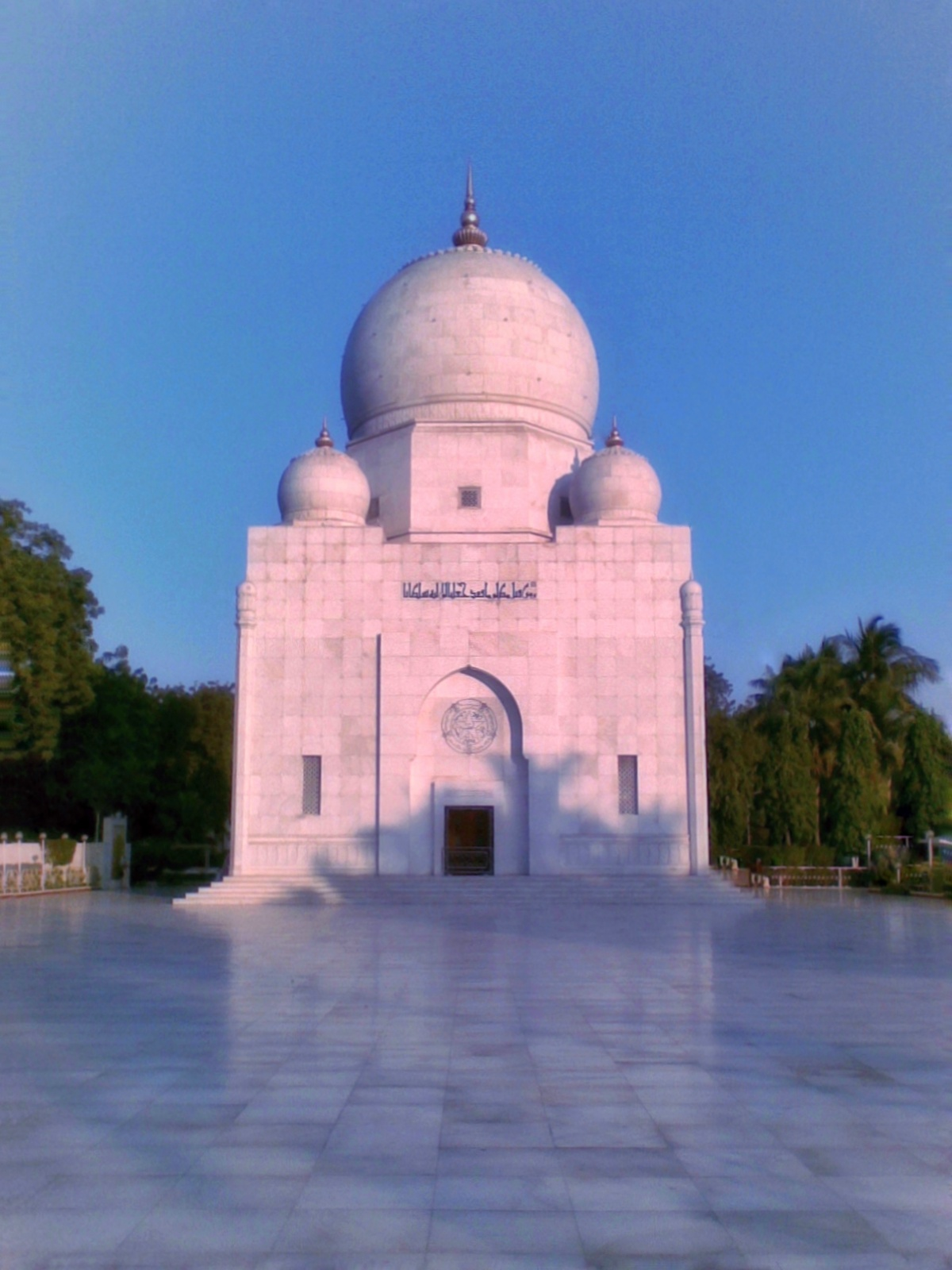
- Mazar-e-Qutbi, Ahmedabad, where Syedna Feer-Khan is buried.

Da'i al-Mutlaq
- In office 1648 AD (1056 AH) – 1657 AD (1065 AH)
- Preceded by: Qutub Khan Qutbuddin
- Succeeded by: Ismail Badruddin I
- Title: Syedna; Maulana; al-Dā'ī al-Mutlaq; al-Dā'ī al-Ajal al-Fātimi

Personal life
- Died: 1657 AD (1065 AH)
- Resting place: Ahmedabad, India
- Children
- Parent: Malak Shah (father)

Religious life
- Religion: Islam
- Sect: Isma'ili; Dawoodi Bohra
- Jurisprudence: Mustaali; Tayyabi

Syedna Feer-Khan Shujauddin (died 9 Zil Qa'dah 1065 AH/1657 AD, Ahmedabad, India) was the 33rd Da'i al-Mutlaq (Absolute Missionary) of the Dawoodi Bohra sect of Musta‘lī Islam. He succeeded the 32nd Da'i Syedna Qutubuddin Shaheed to the religious post. He became Da'i al-Mutlaq in 1056 AH (1648 AD), and his period of Dawat was from 1056-1065 AH (1648-1657 AD).

== Family ==
His father's name was Malak Shah. He married at the age of 17.

== Life ==
Syedna Feer-Khan harbored great interest in acquiring knowledge from an early age. He used to attend discourses conducted by the 28th Da'i Syedna Sheikh-Adam Safiuddin.

He was imprisoned in Aurangabad by the Mughal Emperor Aurangzeb. Thereafter, he was shifted to Lahore and placed in a stable, which on the following night happened to catch fire and was totally destroyed except the dungeon, wherein Syedna was kept. He was found safe in the morning. All people held that the conflagration was due to his captivity. By an imperial order Aurangzeb was compelled to set Syedna at liberty and grant him a safe and honourable return to Ahmedabad in 1647.

It was during Syedna Feer-Khan Shujauddin's tenure that a dissident sect called Hujumiya was formed, led by Ahmed bin Fateh Muhammad, Yusuf bin Chand-ji and Chand Miya Abu-Ji. In 1654, Murad Bakhsh was appointed governor of Gujarat. He arrested Syedna Feer-Khan at the instigation of Ahmed. Syedna Feer-Khan was freed shortly afterwards.

== Death ==
Syedna Feer-Khan Shujauddin died on 9th Zil-Qa'dah 1065 AH (1657 AD) as a result of abdominal pain.

Shia Islam titles
Feer Khan Shujauddin Dā'ī al-Mutlaq Died: 1657 AD (1065 AH)
| Preceded by Qutub Khan Qutbuddin | 33rd Dā'ī al-Mutlaq; 1056–1065 AH/ 1648–1657 AD | Succeeded by Ismail Badruddin I |
