= Gabriel III of Constantinople =

Ecumenical Patriarch of Constantinople from 1702 to 1707

- Ecumenical Patriarch of Constantinople
- Church: Church of Constantinople
- Appointed: 29 August 1702
- Term ended: 25 October 1707
- Predecessor: Callinicus II of Constantinople
- Successor: Neophytus V of Constantinople
- Previous post: Metropolitan of Chalcedon

Personal details
- Born: Smyrna (İzmir)
- Died: 25 October 1707 Constantinople
- Denomination: Eastern Orthodoxy

Gabriel III of Constantinople (Greek: Γαβριήλ; died 25 October 1707) was Ecumenical Patriarch of Constantinople from 29 August 1702 to 25 October 1707.

== Life ==
Gabriel was born in the town of Smyrna (now İzmir) to parents coming from the island of Andros and in 1688 he became Metropolitan of Chalcedon. He was elected Patriarch of Constantinople on 29 August 1702 and reigned till his death. His reign had no particular troubles and was serene.

In 1704, Gabriel III formally condemned the edition of the New Testament into Modern Greek translated by Seraphim of Mytilene and edited in London in 1703 by the English Society for the Propagation of the Gospel in Foreign Parts. On 5 March 1705, he issued an order forbidding the Greek students to study in London due to improper behaviours. In 1706, he issued a letter condemning the Latin doctrines.

He also intervened in the affairs of the autonomous Church of Cyprus, deposing Archbishop Germanos II of Cyprus after complaints of the local population. The Melkite Metropolitan of Aleppo Athanasius III Dabbas was so elected in Constantinople as regent (proedros) Archbishop of Cyprus at the end of 1705. In February 1707, after Athanasius III's return to Constantinople, Gabriel III censored as non-canonical the consecration of the new archbishop Jacob II, who nevertheless reigned until 1718.

With regard to his birth-town Smyrna, in 1706 he founded there a school where the scholar Adamantios Rysios taught. Gabriel III died in Constantinople on 25 October 1707 and was buried at the monastery of Kamariotissa on the island of Halki.

== Notes and references ==
Eastern Orthodox Church titles
Preceded by Callinicus II (3)	Ecumenical Patriarch of Constantinople; 1702 – 1707	Succeeded by Neophytus V
