= Neophytus VI of Constantinople =

Ecumenical Patriarch of Constantinople from 1734 to 1740 and from 1743 to 1744

- Ecumenical Patriarch of Constantinople
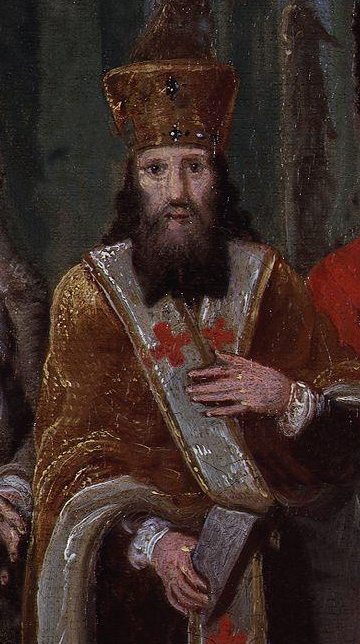
- Church: Church of Constantinople
- In office: 27 September 1734 – August 1740; May 1743 – March 1744
- Predecessor: Seraphim I of Constantinople
- Successor: Paisius II of Constantinople
- Previous post: Metropolitan of Caesarea in Cappadocia

Personal details
- Born: Patmos, Greece
- Died: February or March 1747 Patmos, Greece
- Denomination: Eastern Orthodoxy

Neophytus VI of Constantinople (Greek: Νεόφυτος; died 1747) was Ecumenical Patriarch of Constantinople for two terms, from 1734 to 1740 and from 1743 to 1744.

== Life ==
Neophytus was born in Patmos, and when the Metropolitan of Caesarea in Cappadocia was elected to the Patriarchate as Jeremias III of Constantinople, he was elected in his place as Metropolitan of Caesarea. As Metropolitan of Caesarea, his more important act was restoring in 1728 the monastery of Saint John the Baptist at Zincidere in Cappadocia.

Neophytus VI was appointed as Patriarch on 27 September 1734 supported by the Dragoman of the Porte, the Phanariot Alexander Gikas. His subjection to the Dragoman caused the Grand vizier to order his deposition six years later, in August 1740. Neophytus VI reigned again for a short term, from May 1743 to March 1744, and during this term, he was ordered by the Grand vizier not to have any contact with Alexander Gikas.

His Patriarchal reign was not marked by any particular event, and Neophytus VI mainly dealt with monastic issues. He had letters with Nicolaus Zinzendorf, the reformer of the Moravian Church, but without any result. After his second and final deposition, he was exiled in Patmos where he died in February or March 1747.

== Notes and references ==
Eastern Orthodox Church titles
Preceded by Seraphim I	Ecumenical Patriarch of Constantinople; 1734 – 1740	Succeeded by Paisius II (2)
Preceded by Paisius II (2)	Ecumenical Patriarch of Constantinople; 1743 – 1744	Succeeded by Paisius II (3)
