= James of Constantinople =

Three-time Ecumenical Patriarch of Constantinople

- Ecumenical Patriarch of Constantinople
- Church: Church of Constantinople
- In office: 10 August 1679 – 30 July 1682; 20 March 1685 – March 1686; 12 October 1687 – 3 March 1688
- Predecessor: Athanasius IV of Constantinople; Parthenius IV of Constantinople; Dionysius IV of Constantinople
- Successor: Dionysius IV of Constantinople; Dionysius IV of Constantinople; Callinicus II of Constantinople

Personal details
- Born: Chios, Greece
- Died: 1700 Moldova
- Denomination: Eastern Orthodoxy

James of Constantinople (Greek: Ἰάκωβος; died 1700) was three-time Ecumenical Patriarch of Constantinople (1679–1682, 1685–1686, 1687–1688). He was previously bishop of Larissa.

== Bibliography ==
- Name list of the Archons of the Ecumenical Patriarchate.

Eastern Orthodox Church titles
Preceded by Athanasius IV	Ecumenical Patriarch of Constantinople; 1679 – 1682	Succeeded by Dionysius IV (3)
Preceded by Parthenius IV (5)	Ecumenical Patriarch of Constantinople; 1685 – 1686	Succeeded by Dionysius IV (4)
Preceded by Dionysius IV (4)	Ecumenical Patriarch of Constantinople; 1687 – 1688	Succeeded by Callinicus II
