= Paisius II of Constantinople =

Four-time Ecumenical Patriarch of Constantinople from 1726 to 1752

- Ecumenical Patriarch of Constantinople
- Church: Church of Constantinople
- In office: 20 November 1726 – September 1732; August 1740 – May 1743; March 1744 – 28 September 1748; May 1751 – September 1752
- Predecessor: Callinicus III of Constantinople; Neophytus VI of Constantinople; Cyril V of Constantinople
- Successor: Jeremias III of Constantinople; Neophytus VI of Constantinople; Cyril V of Constantinople
- Previous post: Metropolis of Nicomedia

Personal details
- Born: Kioumourtzoglou Caesarea
- Died: 11 December 1756 Halki
- Denomination: Eastern Orthodoxy

Paisius II of Constantinople (Greek: Παΐσιος Κιουμουρτζόγλου; died 11 December 1756) was Ecumenical Patriarch of Constantinople for four times in the 18th century.

== Life ==
Paisius was born in Caesarea and his family name was Kioumourtzoglou (a common Turkish name among Karamanlides and the Cappadocian Greeks). He probably moved early to Constantinople and became Metropolis of Nicomedia before 1716, probably in 1712.

The first time that Paisius was elected as Patriarch of Constantinople was on 20 November 1726, the day when Callinicus III of Constantinople was found dead by heart attack before his enthronement, Paisius II was immediately chosen by the faction that previously elected Callinicus III to preclude a return to the throne of Jeremias III of Constantinople. The first years of his reign were marked by clashes with the faction gathered around the community of Caesarea, whose main representatives were Jeremias III and later Neophytus VI of Constantinople, despite the fact that Paisius II himself was born in this town. In 1731 this faction tried to depose him and to restore Jeremias III, but failed. A second attempt in September 1732 was successful when Jeremias III overthrew him. When later Jeremias III had to retire due to health problems, a Patriarch from Nicomedia (Seraphim I of Constantinople) followed and later again one from Caesarea (Neophytus VI) who reigned six years.

The reign of Neophytus VI was ended by a decision of the Grand vizier, who allowed Paisius II to be reinstalled for his second term in August 1740. However three years later, in May 1743, Paisius II was deposed by the Ottoman authorities for financial issues and Neophytus VI was restored.

The third reign of Paisius II began in March 1744, when he overthrew Neophytus VI. Shortly after however a new opponent arose: the Metropolis of Nicomedia and future Patriarch Cyril V of Constantinople, who voiced the complaints against him and was able to depose him on 28 September 1748. The complaints were due mainly to Paisius II's financial management of the millet, i.e. the Christian civil community ruled by the Patriarch, to reduce the high levels of debts, Paisius II increased the taxation, particularly of the laity, and this caused discontent with him.

Paisius II's fourth term was an interlude in the reign of Cyril V and began in last days of May 1751 when Cyril V was actually deposed by the Metropolitans both because of his regulations on taxes and because of his strong position in favor of the necessity of re-baptism of Armenian and Latin converts. Cyril V however was supported by a large portion of the populace and by the demagogic monk Auxentius, who instigated riots which culminated in a violent assault on the Patriarchate and the seizure of Paisius II himself. Paisius II was subsequently deposed and Cyril V was reinstated on 7 September 1752 after a gift to the Ottoman authorities of 45,000 piastres.

After his fourth and final deposition, Paisius II retired in the monastery of Kamariotissa on island of Halki, where he died on 11 December 1756.

== Bibliography ==
- Frazee, Charles (2006) [1983]. Catholics and Sultans - The Church and the Ottoman Empire 1453–1923. Cambridge University Press. ISBN 9780521027007.

Religious titles
| Preceded by Callinicus III | Ecumenical Patriarch of Constantinople; 1726 – 1732 | Succeeded by Jeremias III |
| Preceded by Neophytus VI | Ecumenical Patriarch of Constantinople; 1740–1743 | Succeeded by Neophytus VI |
| Preceded by Neophytus VI | Ecumenical Patriarch of Constantinople; 1744–1748 | Succeeded by Cyril V |
| Preceded by Cyril V | Ecumenical Patriarch of Constantinople; 1751 – 1752 | Succeeded by Cyril V |
