= Athanasius IV of Constantinople =

Ecumenical Patriarch of Constantinople in 1679

- Ecumenical Patriarch of Constantinople
- Church: Church of Constantinople
- In office: 30 July – 10 August 1679
- Predecessor: Dionysius IV of Constantinople
- Successor: James of Constantinople

Personal details
- Died: After 1679
- Denomination: Eastern Orthodoxy

Athanasius IV of Constantinople (Greek: Ἀθανάσιος; died after 1679) was Ecumenical Patriarch of Constantinople (30 July – 10 August 1679).

== Bibliography ==
- Εγκυκλοπαίδεια Πάπυρος-Larousse-Britannica, 2007, Vol. 2, pp. 651–652.

Eastern Orthodox Church titles
Preceded by Dionysius IV (2)	Ecumenical Patriarch of Constantinople; 1679	Succeeded by James
