= Qutub Khan Qutbuddin =

32nd Da'i al-Mutlaq of the Dawoodi Bohras

Syedna Qutub Khan Qutbuddin: as-Shaheed; 32nd Da'i al-Mutlaq of the Dawoodi Bohra
- قُطب خان قُطبُ الدِّين
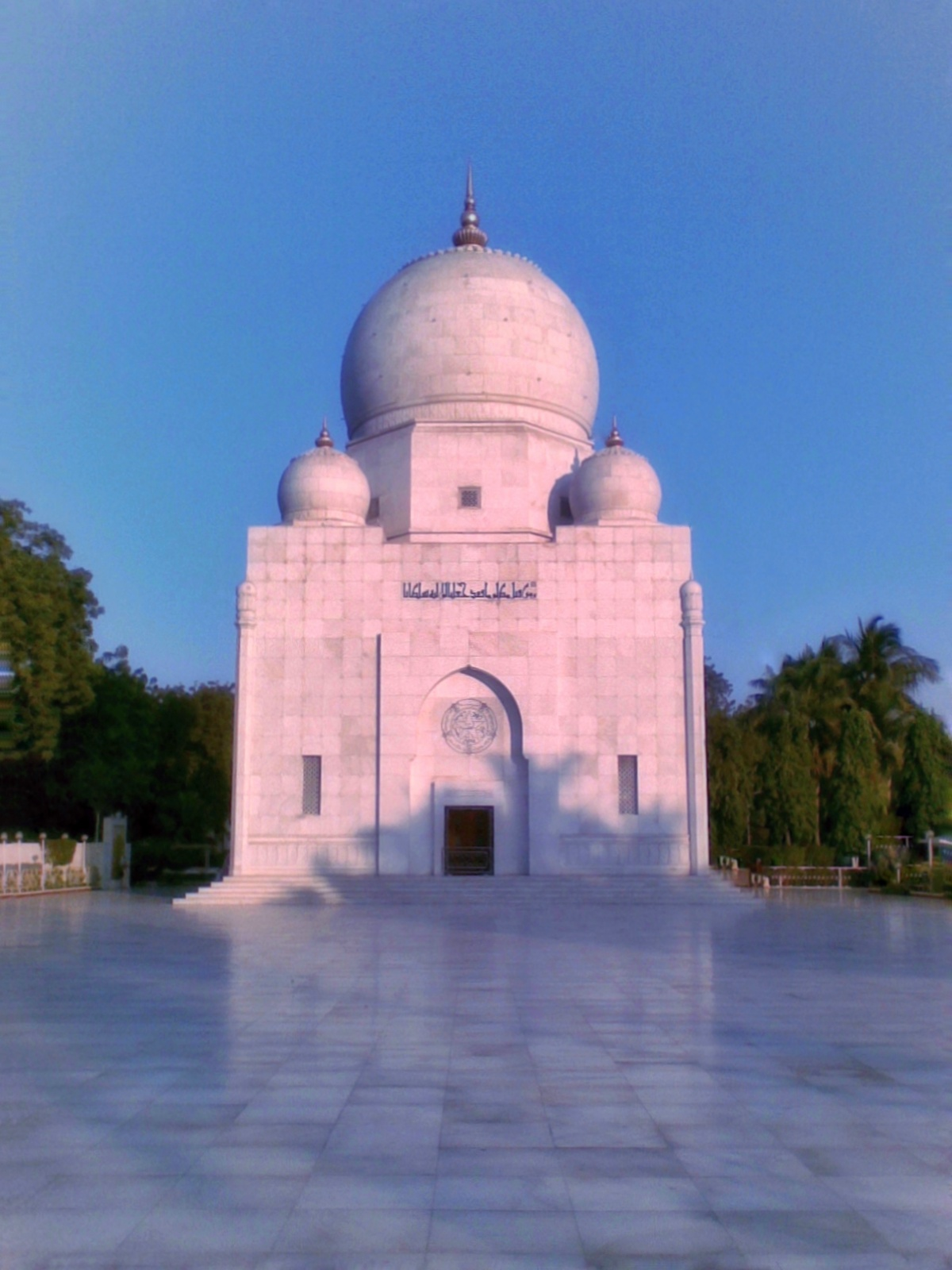
- Mazar-e-Qutbi, Saraspur, Ahmedabad (2010).

Da'i al-Mutlaq
- In office 1644–1646
- Preceded by: Kasim Khan Zainuddin
- Succeeded by: Syedna Feer Khan Shujauddin
- Title: Syedna; Maulana; Shaheed

Personal life
- Born: Qutubuddin; 30 Dhu'l-Qa'da 985 AH; February 8, 1578 AD Ahmedabad, Mughal Empire
- Died: 27 Jumada II 1056 AH; July 11, 1646 AD (aged 68)
- Resting place: Ahmedabad, Gujarat
- Home town: Ahmedabad, India
- Parent: Dawood Bin Qutubshah (father)
- Known for: The first-ever shaheed amongst the Da'i al-Mutlaq
- Relatives: Abd al-Tayyib Zakiuddin (brother)

Religious life
- Religion: Shi'a Islam
- Sect: Ismailism; Dawoodi Bohra
- Jurisprudence: Mustaali; Tayyibi

Syedna Qutub Khan Qutbuddin Ash-Shaheed (Arabic: سيّدنا قُطب خان قُطبُ الدِّين الشهيد, lit. 'Qutub Khan, the Axis of Faith, the Martyred') was the 32nd Da'i al-Mutlaq of the Dawoodi Bohra. He succeeded Kasim Khan Zainuddin bin Feer Khan. He was the first Da'i to be killed for his faith, hence, his followers similarize his death to that of the Shi’a Imam Husayn ibn Ali. Accordingly, Syed Qutub’s burial place, Mazar-e-Qutbi, is referred by his followers as Choti Karbala (lit. 'little Karbala').

== Family ==
His father was 27th Dai Syedna Dawood Bin Qutubshah, his mother's name was Raani Aai Saheba Ali Jiva. He had two brothers: 29th Dai Syedna Abduttayyeb Zakiuddin I, Miya Khan-ji and a sister called Habiba.

== Early life ==
Syedna Qutbuddin was born in Ahmedabad during the era of the 26th Dai, Dawood ibn Ajab Shah, on the night of 30 Dhu'l-Qa'da 985 AH. During his youth, he accompanied his father, the 27th Dai, Dawood Bin Qutubshah to Lahore to the court of the Mughal Emperor, Jalal-ud-din Akbar, during the fitnah of Sulayman bin Hassan. Akbar had summoned Qutub Shah to his court to address the dispute of succession raised by Sulayman, but ultimately issued a royal decree in Qutub Shah's favor.

== Accession ==
Qutbuddin was close-confidant to his brother, the 29th Da'i, Abd al-Tayyib Zakiuddin I. After his brother's death, Qutbuddin continued to serve the 30th Da'i, Ali Shams al-Din IV, who was based in Yemen. Later, the 31st Da'i, Kasim Khan Zainuddin, appointed Qutbuddin as his Mazoon (deputy), and a while later, his Mansoos (Nass designated successor).

Qutbuddin became Da'i al-Mutlaq in 1054 AH (1646 AD). He held the office for 1 year and 8 months before he was slain on the order of Aurangzeb, the Mughal governor of Gujarat, on the grounds of heresy.

== Death ==
In the month of Jumada I 1056 AH (1646 AD), false allegations of rafida (one who rejects the sunnat of Muhammad, introduces innovations viz. bidat, and practices exaggeration viz. ghulat), were made to Abdul Qawi (called Abdul Ghawi too), an office bearer of the governorate. On 28 Jumada I, Shah Beg arrested Qutbuddin and Feer Khan Shujauddin.

Qutbuddin and Shujauddin spent the next twenty days in prison, meanwhile, Abdul Qawi instructed his scholars to peruse books ceased from Qutbuddin's personal library (approx 6 cars full of books) but was unable to discern anything blasphemous or apostastic. On 21 Jumada II, Qutbuddin was summoned to an audience in front of Aurangzeb where Abdul Qawi asked him to enter guilty plea and repent for his sins in exchange for pardon. Qutbuddin said:

I am not rafzi, nor were my forefathers. We are truly upon the sunnah of prophet Muhammad. I declare that there is no God but Allah and Muhammad is his messenger. I read the holy book, I offer daily prayers, give zakat, fast in the holy month of Ramadan, and perform hajj to the Bayt al-Allah. I am a Muslim. How is my blood legal for you to shed?"

Abdul Qawi had a group of elites from the city sign their testimony against Qutbuddin’s character. The testimony was introduced as evidence but the qadi (judge) demanded an in-person testimonial. On 26 Jumada II, Abdul Qawi summoned two sons of Qutbuddin who further confessed against their father. This ultimately led the judge to issue a death sentence against the Da’i.

On the morning of 27 Jumada II 1056 H, the grandson of Akbar the Great (Jalal-ud-Din Muhammad Akbar) called Aurangzeb (who was the sixth Mughal emperor) approved the execution order of Syedna 'Qutub Khan Qutbuddin(who was the 32nd Da'i al-Mutlaq of the Dawoodi Bohra) . Abdul Qawi had Shah Beg carry out the beheading immediately.

== Succession ==
Qutbuddin was succeeded by Feer Khan Shujauddin. Mufaddal Saifuddin, the current Da'i al-Mutlaq, is from his progeny.

Shia Islam titles
Qutub Khan Qutbuddin Dā'ī al-Mutlaq Born: February 8, 1578 AD Died: July 11, 1646 AD
Preceded by Kasim Khan Zainuddin	32nd Dā'ī al-Mutlaq; 1054–1056 AH/ 1646–1648 AD	Succeeded by Feer Khan Shujauddin
