= Methodius III of Constantinople =

Ecumenical Patriarch of Constantinople from 1668 to 1671

- Ecumenical Patriarch of Constantinople
- Church: Church of Constantinople
- In office: 5 January 1668 – March 1671
- Predecessor: Clement of Constantinople
- Successor: Parthenius IV of Constantinople

Personal details
- Died: 1679
- Denomination: Eastern Orthodoxy

Methodius III of Constantinople, called Moronis or Maronis (Greek: Μεθόδιος ὁ Μορώνης/Μαρώνης); died 1679), was Ecumenical Patriarch of Constantinople in 1668–1671.

Descended from Crete, he served at the Church of the Theotokos of Chrysopigi in Galata. In 1646, he was elected Metropolitan of Heraclea. On 5 January 1668, he was elected Ecumenical Patriarch, succeeding Patriarch Clement of Constantinople.

But because former Patriarch Parthenius IV of Constantinople was hostile towards him, he was forced to resign in March 1671 and to become a monk in the Nea Moni of Chios and after that in the Strofades Monastery in Zakynthos. In 1677, he went to Venice and became commissioner in the Orthodox Church of Saint George, which served the local Greek-speaking community, until 1679 when he died.

== Bibliography ==
- Ecumenical Patriarchate.
- Νεώτερον Εγκυκλοπαιδικόν Λεξικόν Ηλίου Vol. 13, p. 172.

Eastern Orthodox Church titles
Preceded by Clement	Ecumenical Patriarch of Constantinople; 1668 – 1671	Succeeded by Parthenius IV (3)
