= Cyprianus of Constantinople =

Ecumenical Patriarch of Constantinople from 1707 to 1709 and 1713 to 1714

- Ecumenical Patriarch of Constantinople
- Church: Church of Constantinople
- Diocese: Constantinople
- See: Ecumenical Patriarchate
- Installed: 25 October 1707; November 1713
- Term ended: May 1709; 28 February 1714
- Predecessor: Neophytus V of Constantinople; Cyril IV of Constantinople
- Successor: Athanasius V of Constantinople; Cosmas III of Constantinople

Personal details
- Died: After 1714
- Denomination: Eastern Orthodox Church

Cyprianus of Constantinople (Greek: Κυπριανός; died after 1714) served as Ecumenical Patriarch of Constantinople twice, in 1707–1709 and 1713–1714. He served as metropolitan bishop of Kayseri. On 25 October 1707, he was elected Patriarch, succeeding Neophytus V of Constantinople.

He gave emphasis to the strictness of clerics' lives and preserved up to today, is his circular about clergy being forbidden to use bright clothing («μὴ λαμπραῖς ἐσθῆσι χρῆσθαι τοῖς ἱερωμένοις»). He made, though, enemies and was led to his deposition in May 1709. Later, he was exiled to Vatopedi Monastery of Mount Athos.

In November 1713, when Cyril IV of Constantinople refused the increase to the tax to Sublime Porte and resigned, Cyprianus was reelected Patriarch. Neither he, though, was able to pay the tax of 25,000 Kuruş and he resigned again on 28 February 1714.

== Bibliography ==
- Οικουμενικό Πατριαρχείο

Eastern Orthodox Church titles
Preceded by Neophytus V	Ecumenical Patriarch of Constantinople; 1707 – 1709	Succeeded by Athanasius V
Preceded by Cyril IV	Ecumenical Patriarch of Constantinople; 1713 – 1714	Succeeded by Cosmas III
