= Gerasimus II of Constantinople =

Ecumenical Patriarch of Constantinople from 1673 to 1674

- Ecumenical Patriarch of Constantinople
- Church: Church of Constantinople
- Installed: 25 July 1673
- Term ended: December 1674
- Predecessor: Dionysius IV of Constantinople
- Successor: Parthenius IV of Constantinople

Personal details
- Died: 6 February 1689
- Denomination: Eastern Orthodoxy

Gerasimus II of Constantinople (Ancient Greek: Γεράσιμος; died 6 February 1689) served as Ecumenical Patriarch of Constantinople in 1673–1674 in succession to Dionysius IV of Constantinople.

== Bibliography ==
- List of Patriarchs on the official website of the Ecumenical Patriarchate

Eastern Orthodox Church titles
Preceded by Dionysius IV	Ecumenical Patriarch of Constantinople; 1673 – 1674	Succeeded by Parthenius IV (4)
