= Athanasius V of Constantinople =

Ecumenical Patriarch of Constantinople from 1709 to 1711

- Ecumenical Patriarch of Constantinople
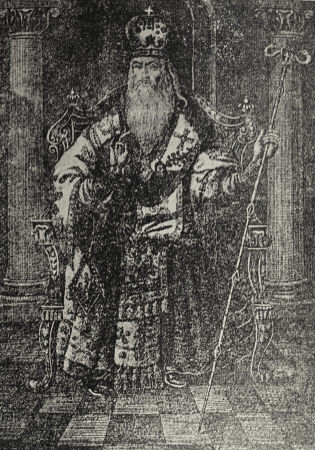
- Church: Church of Constantinople
- Diocese: Constantinople
- See: Ecumenical Patriarchate of Constantinople
- Installed: May 1709
- Term ended: 4 December 1711
- Predecessor: Cyprianus of Constantinople
- Successor: Cyril IV of Constantinople

Personal details
- Born: Crete
- Died: After 1711
- Denomination: Eastern Orthodox Church

Athanasius V of Constantinople (Greek: Ἀθανάσιος; died after 1711) served as Ecumenical Patriarch of Constantinople during the period 1709–1711.

He descended from Crete. He studied in Halle, Saxony and was distinguished for his wide education, multilingualism (Latin, Arabic) and deep knowledge of ecclesiastic music. Firstly, he was elected Metropolitan bishop of Veliko Tarnovo and then, in 1692, of Edirne.

After Cyprianus of Constantinople's deposition and exile to Mount Athos, Cyril IV of Constantinople, metropolitan bishop of Cyzicus, was elected Patriarch, but after the intervention of the Grand vizier Çorlulu Ali Pasha, Athanasius V became Patriarch. During his reign, he was suspected of pro-Catholic leanings.

On 4 December 1711, he was deposed, and Cyril IV of Constantinople was restored to the throne. Then, he dedicated himself to studying until his death. He made great work in the domain of ecclesiastic music.

== Bibliography ==
- Οικουμενικό Πατριαρχείο.
- Αποστολική Διακονία της Εκκλησίας της Ελλάδος.
- Εγκυκλοπαίδεια Πάπυρος-Larousse-Britannica, 2007, vol. 2, p. 652.
- Steven Runciman (2010), Η Μεγάλη Εκκλησία εν αιχμαλωσία, Εκδόσεις Γκοβόστη ISBN 9789604461301.

Eastern Orthodox Church titles
Preceded by Cyprianus	Ecumenical Patriarch of Constantinople; 1709 – 1711	Succeeded by Cyril IV
