= Dionysius IV of Constantinople =

Five-time Ecumenical Patriarch of Constantinople from 1671 to 1694

- Ecumenical Patriarch of Constantinople
- Church: Church of Constantinople
- In office: 8 November 1671 – 25 July 1673; 29 July 1676 – 30 July 1679; 10 July 1682 – 30 March 1684; March 1686 – 17 October 1687; August 1693 – April 1694
- Predecessor: Parthenius IV of Constantinople; James of Constantinople; Callinicus II of Constantinople
- Successor: Gerasimus II of Constantinople; Athanasius IV of Constantinople; Parthenius IV of Constantinople; James of Constantinople; Callinicus II of Constantinople

Personal details
- Born: Constantinople
- Died: 23 September 1696 Târgoviște
- Buried: Radu Vodă Monastery, Bucharest
- Denomination: Eastern Orthodoxy

Dionysius IV of Constantinople (Greek: Διονύσιος Μουσελίμης; died 23 September 1696) was Ecumenical Patriarch of Constantinople for five times, in 1671–1673, 1676–1679, 1682–1684, 1686–1687, and 1693–1694.

== Life ==
He was born in Constantinople, where he grew up. He studied at the Phanar Greek Orthodox College and worked as an administrative officer at the Patriarchate. On 9 August 1662, he was elected bishop of Larissa, where he remained until 1671, when he was first elected Ecumenical Patriarch of Constantinople. After serving his first term as Patriarch, Dionysius IV was appointed the Metropolitan of Philippopolis (Plovdiv). He claimed descent from the Komnenian dynasty, but this claim is considered fictional by modern historians.

During his second term, in 1678 Dionysius IV merged eparchies of Gothia and Caffa in Crimea on decision of the Holy Synod.

After his second term as Patriarch of Constantinople, from 1676 to 1679, he settled in Wallachia, a historical region of Romania, while serving another term at the eparchy of Philippopolis. Dionysius IV was in conflict with Patriarch James of Constantinople from 1679 to 1682, whom he forced to resign in 1682. After his third term (1682–1684), when Parthenius IV of Constantinople (1684–1685) was restored for his fourth time, he moved to Chalcedon until 1686. He returned to Constantinople in March 1686 and overthrew James again, who was restored for the first time (1685–1686). He wrote letters to the Patriarch of Moscow which effectively established the Metropolis of Kiev (Patriarchate of Moscow). James retaliated by offering a large sum to the Grand vizier and overthrew Dionysius IV on 12 October 1687.

He was imprisoned by the Ottoman Turks twice, in 1679, and from 1687 until 1688. After his final removal from the patriarchal throne in 1694, he retired in Bucharest, Romania. Dionysius IV died on 23 September 1696 at Târgoviște in Wallachia and was buried in Radu Vodă Monastery, a Romanian Orthodox monastery in Bucharest, where he lived his last years.

During his time of patriarchy, he dealt with many religious and political subjects including the position of the Orthodox Church against the Protestant confessions and Calvinist theologians.

== See also ==
- Annexation of the Metropolitanate of Kyiv by the Moscow Patriarchate

== Bibliography ==
- List of Patriarchs on the official website of the Ecumenical Patriarchate.

Eastern Orthodox Church titles
Preceded by Parthenius IV (3)	Ecumenical Patriarch of Constantinople; 1671 – 1673	Succeeded by Gerasimus II
Preceded by Parthenius IV (4)	Ecumenical Patriarch of Constantinople; 1676 – 1679	Succeeded by Athanasius IV
Preceded by James	Ecumenical Patriarch of Constantinople; 1682 – 1684	Succeeded by Parthenius IV (5)
Preceded by James (2)	Ecumenical Patriarch of Constantinople; 1686 – 1687	Succeeded by James (3)
Preceded by Callinicus II (2)	Ecumenical Patriarch of Constantinople; 1693 – 1694	Succeeded by Callinicus II (3)
