= Dionysius III of Constantinople =

Ecumenical Patriarch of Constantinople from 1662 to 1665

- Ecumenical Patriarch of Constantinople
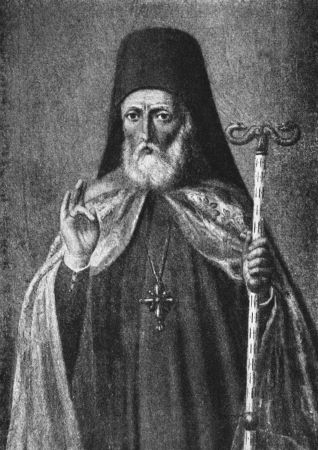
- Church: Church of Constantinople
- In office: 29 June 1662 – 21 October 1665
- Predecessor: Parthenius IV of Constantinople
- Successor: Parthenius IV of Constantinople

Personal details
- Died: 14 October 1696
- Denomination: Eastern Orthodoxy

Dionysius III of Constantinople (Greek: Διονύσιος; died 14 October 1696) was the Ecumenical Patriarch of Constantinople from 29 June 1662 to 21 October 1665. He had previously been bishop of Thessaloniki, Larissa (1652–1662) and Bursa.

== Notes and references ==
Eastern Orthodox Church titles
Preceded by Parthenius IV	Ecumenical Patriarch of Constantinople; 1662 – 1665	Succeeded by Parthenius IV (2)
