= Parthenius IV of Constantinople =

Five-time Ecumenical Patriarch of Constantinople from 1657 to 1685

- Ecumenical Patriarch of Constantinople
- Church: Church of Constantinople
- In office: 1 May 1657 – June 1662; 21 October 1665 – 9 September 1667; March 1671 – 7 September 1671; 1 January 1675 – 29 July 1676; 10 March 1684 – 20 March 1685
- Predecessor: Gabriel II of Constantinople; Dionysius III of Constantinople; Methodius III of Constantinople; Gerasimus II of Constantinople; Dionysius IV of Constantinople
- Successor: Dionysius III of Constantinople; Clement of Constantinople; Dionysius IV of Constantinople; Dionysius IV of Constantinople; James of Constantinople

Personal details
- Born: Probably Adrianople
- Died: After 1685 (probably late in the 17th century) Probably Adrianople
- Denomination: Eastern Orthodoxy

Parthenius IV of Constantinople (Greek: Παρθένιος; died after 1685) was five-time Ecumenical Patriarch of Constantinople (1657–1662, 1665–1667, 1671, 1675–1676, 1684–1685).

== Life ==
Little is known of his early life. He was born in the first half of the seventeenth century, probably in Adrianople. He is also referred to as Mogilalos or Choumchoumis. He became known when he was elected Metropolitan of Prousa (Bursa in modern Turkey) in January 1655. While metropolitan of Prousa he took care of the restoration and decoration of the Church of St. George, which became the cathedral of the city of Prousa.

He became Ecumenical Patriarch of Constantinople for the first time on 1 May 1657 and remained patriarch until June 1662 when he resigned and returned to his old see. However, he remained there for only a short time before leaving the Diocese of Prousa and settling at Wallachia. From Wallachia, he returned to Constantinople to become patriarch again on 21 October 1665. On 9 September 1667, he was deposed from the patriarchal throne a second time and exiled to Tenedos. A few months later he was recalled and was appointed the Metropolitan of Proilabos, before he settled at Adrianople and becoming the Metropolitan of Tirnovo "eis zoarkeian" (i.e. without pastoral obligations).

In March 1671, Parthenius IV became patriarch of Constantinople for a third time, after paying 20,000 florins. He was patriarch for about a half year, until 7 September 1671, when he was exiled to Cyprus. Later he was allowed to leave exile, and he returned to Adrianople. Parthenius IV became patriarch for the fourth time on 1 January 1675 with a term lasting until 29 July 1676. He served a fifth term as patriarch of Constantinople from 10 March 1684 to 20 March 1685, before he was retired as the "eis zoarkeian" metropolitan of Anchialos.

The date that Parthenius IV died is unknown, but it probably was late in the seventeenth century, in Adrianople.

== Bibliography ==
This article incorporates text from Parthenius IV of Constantinople at OrthodoxWiki which is licensed under the CC-BY-SA and GFDL.

Eastern Orthodox Church titles
Preceded by Gabriel II	Ecumenical Patriarch of Constantinople; 1657 – 1662	Succeeded by Dionysius III
Preceded by Dionysius III	Ecumenical Patriarch of Constantinople; 1665 – 1667	Succeeded by Clement
Preceded by Methodius III	Ecumenical Patriarch of Constantinople; 1671	Succeeded by Dionysius IV
Preceded by Gerasimus II	Ecumenical Patriarch of Constantinople; 1675 – 1676	Succeeded by Dionysius IV (2)
Preceded by Dionysius IV (3)	Ecumenical Patriarch of Constantinople; 1684 – 1685	Succeeded by James (2)
