= Neophytus V of Constantinople =

Ecumenical Patriarch of Constantinople in 1707

- Ecumenical Patriarch of Constantinople
- Church: Church of Constantinople
- Appointed: 20 October 1707
- Term ended: 25 October 1707 (5 days)
- Predecessor: Gabriel III of Constantinople
- Successor: Cyprianus of Constantinople
- Previous post: Metropolitan of Heraclea

Personal details
- Died: 1711
- Denomination: Eastern Orthodoxy

Neophytus V of Constantinople (Greek: Νεόφυτος; died 1711) was Ecumenical Patriarch of Constantinople for a few days in 1707.

== Life ==
Neophytus was appointed Metropolitan of Heraclea on 15 May 1689. The bishops and the laity elected him as Patriarch of Constantinople on 20 October 1707. He was not confirmed however by the Ottoman Sultan, who reserved the right, as previously the Byzantine Emperor, to confirm the election. Thus, in five days, Neophytus V was deposed and he remained Metropolitan of Heraclea until 1711, the probable year of his death.

== Notes and references ==
Eastern Orthodox Church titles
Preceded by Gabriel III	Ecumenical Patriarch of Constantinople; 1707	Succeeded by Cyprianus
