= Clement of Constantinople =

Ecumenical Patriarch of Constantinople in 1667

- Ecumenical Patriarch of Constantinople
- Church: Church of Constantinople
- In office: 9 September 1667 – 21 October 1667
- Predecessor: Parthenius IV of Constantinople
- Successor: Methodius III of Constantinople

Personal details
- Died: After 1667
- Denomination: Eastern Orthodoxy

Clement of Constantinople (Greek: Κλήμης; died after 1667) was Ecumenical Patriarch of Constantinople for 42 days in 1667.

He was the metropolitan of Iconium when he was elected Patriarch on 9 September 1667. He was an uneducated and brusque person and his election was not recognised. The Holy Synod protested to Sultan Mehmed IV, who dismissed him on 21 October 1667.

== Bibliography ==
- Ecumenical Patriarchate

Eastern Orthodox Church titles
Preceded by Parthenius IV (2)	Ecumenical Patriarch of Constantinople; 1667	Succeeded by Methodius III
