= Dawood Bin Qutubshah =

Syedna Dawood bin Qutubshah Burhanuddin 27th Da'i al-Mutlaq of the Dawoodi Bohra
- داؤد بن قطب شاه بُرهان الدين
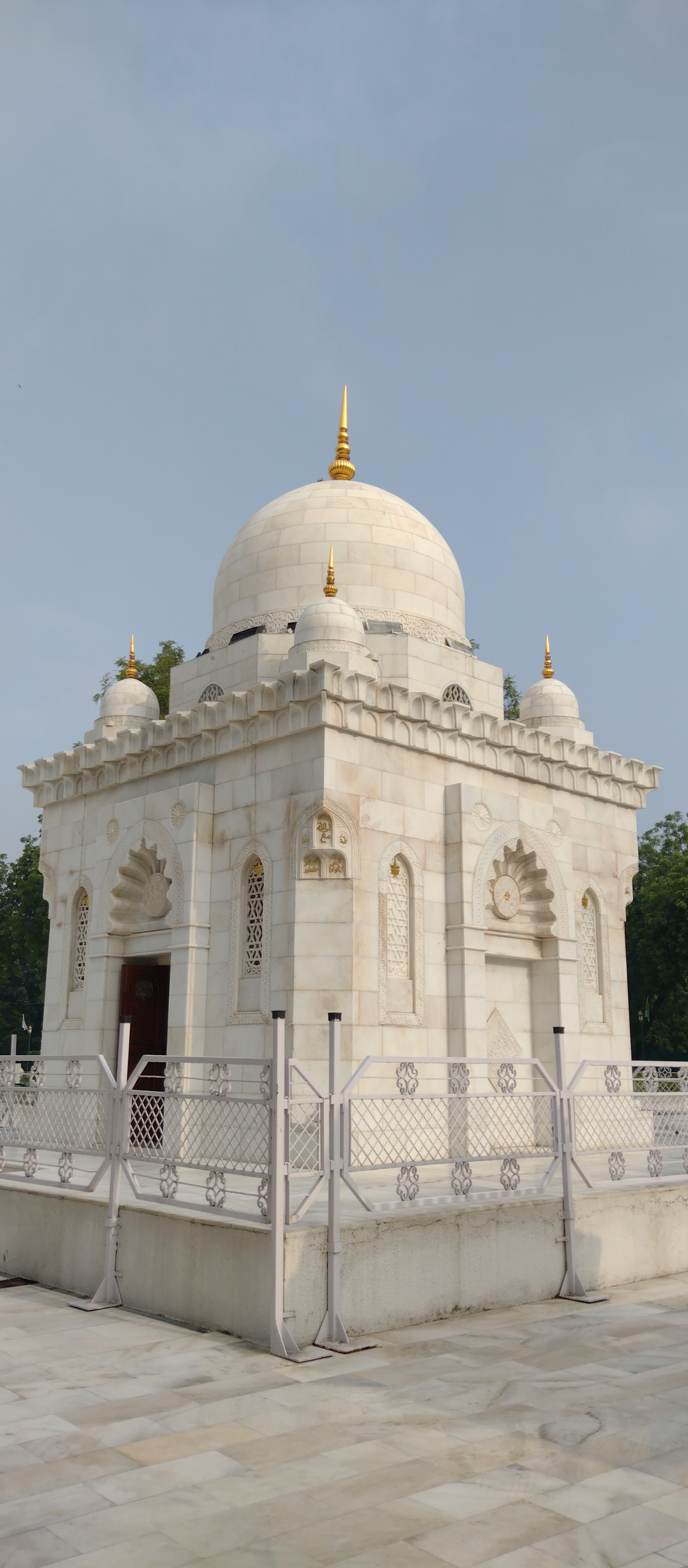
- Syedna Dawood's mausoleum in Ahmedabad.

Da'i al-Mutlaq
- In office 1591 AD (999 AH) – 1612 AD (1021 AH)
- Preceded by: Dawood Bin Ajabshah
- Succeeded by: Sheikh Aadam Safiuddin
- Title: Syedna; Maulana; Da'i al-Mutlaq; Da'i al-Fatemi

Personal life
- Born: 23 Rabi-Ul-Awwal 946 AH/17 August 1539
- Died: 15 Jumadil Akhir 1021 AH/12 August 1612 Ahmedabad, India
- Resting place: Ahmedabad, India
- Parents: Qutubshah bin Khwaja bin Ali (father); Eijal-Ghori baisaheba binte Ali Johari (mother)

Religious life
- Religion: Islam
- Sect: Isma'ili; Dawoodi Bohra
- Jurisprudence: Mustaali; Tayyabi

Syedna Dawood Bin Qutubshah (born 23 Rabi-Ul-Awwal 946 AH/8 August 1539; died 15 Jumadil Akhir 1021 AH/1612 AD, Ahmedabad, India) was the 27th Da'i al-Mutlaq (Absolute Missionary) of the Dawoodi Bohra sect of Musta‘lī Islam. He succeeded the 26th, Dai Syedna Dawood Bin Ajabshah, to the religious post.

== Family ==
Syedna Dawood was born in 1539. His father was QutubShah bin Khwaja bin Ali, while his mother was Eijal Ghori baisaheba binte Ali Johari. His mother had memorized the entire Quran. Syedna Dawood married Hawwa Aai Saheba binte Mohammed bin Ali but she died after a short period. After her, Syedna Dawood married Raani Aai Saheba binte Ali bhai bin Jiva bhai. With her, he had three sons: Syedna Abduttayyeb Zakiuddin I, Syedna Qutub Khan Qutubuddin, Miya Khan-ji and a daughter Habiba. After her death, Syedna Dawood married Vazira Aai Saheba binte Miya Adam but she died after a short period. After her, Syedna Dawood married Shaha Aai Saheba binte Miya Khan. With her, he had a daughter Amatullah baisaheba and a son Miya Mohammad.

== Early life ==
Syedna Dawood's early education was under Shah-ji bin Miya Sham'oon bin Jaafar. By age 10, he had memorized the Quran. At 21 years of age, Syedna performed Hajj and then went to Yemen to study under Syedna Yusuf Najmuddin I for four years. He then returned to India.

== Life ==
Syedna Dawood Bin Qutubshah became Da'i al-Mutlaq in 999 AH (1591 AD). His period of Dawat was from 999 to 1021 AH (1591–1612 AD).

Sulayman bin Hassan was in Yemen when the 26th Dai Syedna Dawood Bin Ajabshah died; he sent a condolence message to Qutubshah, which was proof of his acknowledgment of Syedna Dawood as the rightful Dai and successor.

In 1005 AH Syedna Dawood Bin Qutubshah, was called by emperor Akbar to appear at the court. Syedna was in seclusion for four years but the bounties of emperor and his message was conveyed to him. When Syedna reached Lahore, the emperor was in Kashmir. He was escorted to the court of Kashmir. The emperor received him and was influenced by the spirituality of Syedna. He returned to Ahmedabad under the protection of the emperor with Royal Farman, ordering the officials at Ahmedabad to show him every attention and to receive him wherever he went with respect on account of his great learning, virtue and piety.

Emperor Akbar's farman:

"Allaho-akbar. This glorious farman is issued graciously to satisfy the wishes of sardar of Dawoodi Bohras after considering and calling him to our darbar so that the deputies of Gujarat especially authorities of Ahmedabad and Sidhpur and areas in connection to them, not obstruct them in their ways and let them come to us according to their will. And (the authorities) should not object them and his followers especially in their religious traditions, systems and taxes and about prohibited things and they should return their properties which are sealed, after removing the seals giving them back. Not to restrict them from any business or occupation they are willing. They should give facilities to them and authorities should not be covetous for anything. They should return all the properties which are seized because in the near future their case is to be taken under consideration. Karories, Jagirdars and all responsible Mutasaddirs of Gujarat are required to extend all facilities to the mentioned pious persons while passing through their territories. If he wants any guide then provide him with it for safety against robbery and all dangers of the way so that they may reach to their safe place. To respect them must be considered a duty. 1st Rabiul-Awwal 1005 A.D. Capitol Lahore."

== Succession ==
Syedna Dawood Bin Qutubshah appointed or gave nass to Sheikh Aadam Safiuddin as the next Dai al Mutlaq.

== Mausoleum ==
Syedna Mohammed Burhanuddin dedicated a new mausoleum in 1996. Many features from Fatemi monuments are replicated. The front door facade and corner designs are derived from Aqmar Mosque and Raudat Tahera.

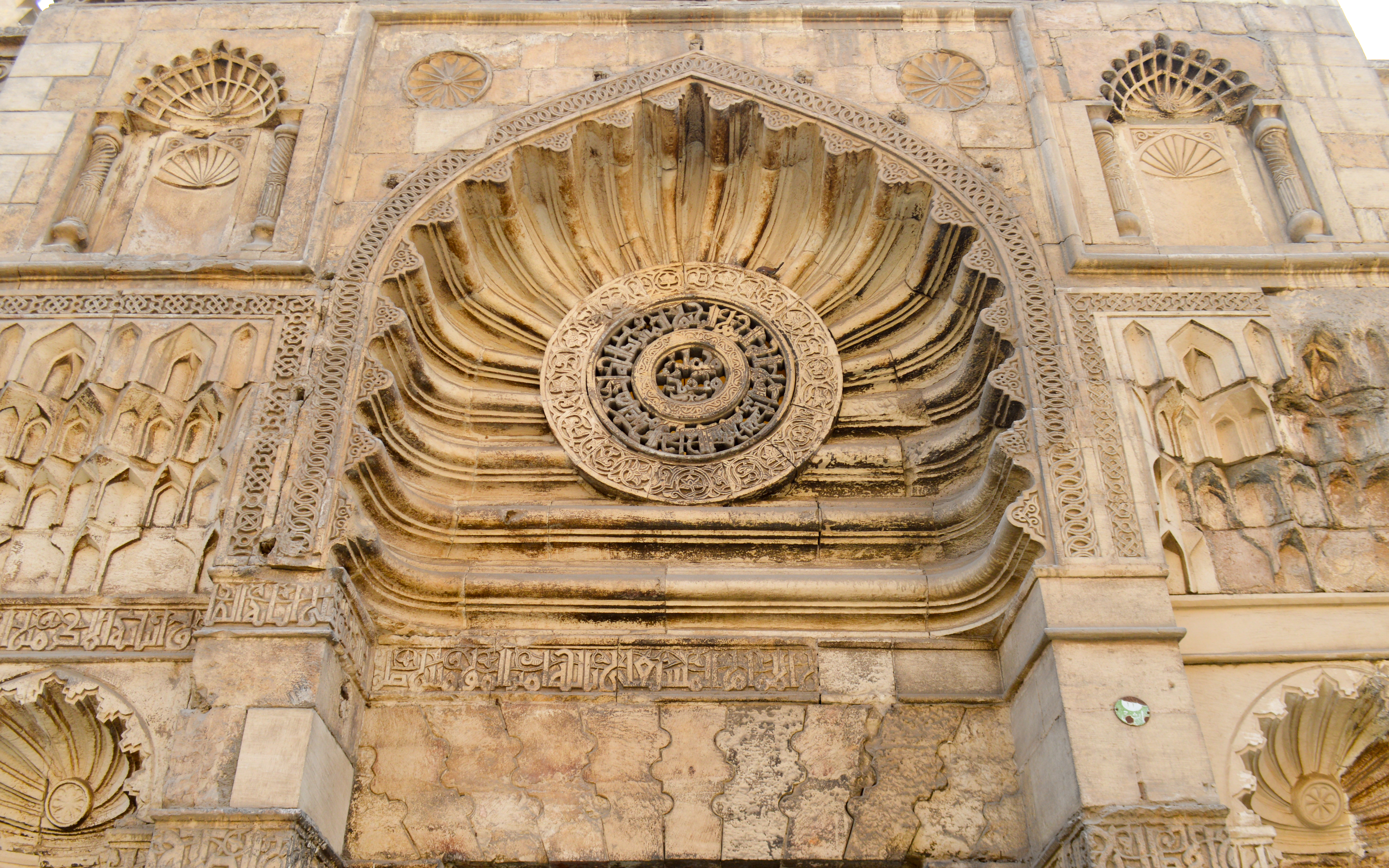
Al-jāmiʿ al-aqmar's façade which has been replicated in the mausoleum's doors (image on top of page).

== Gallery ==
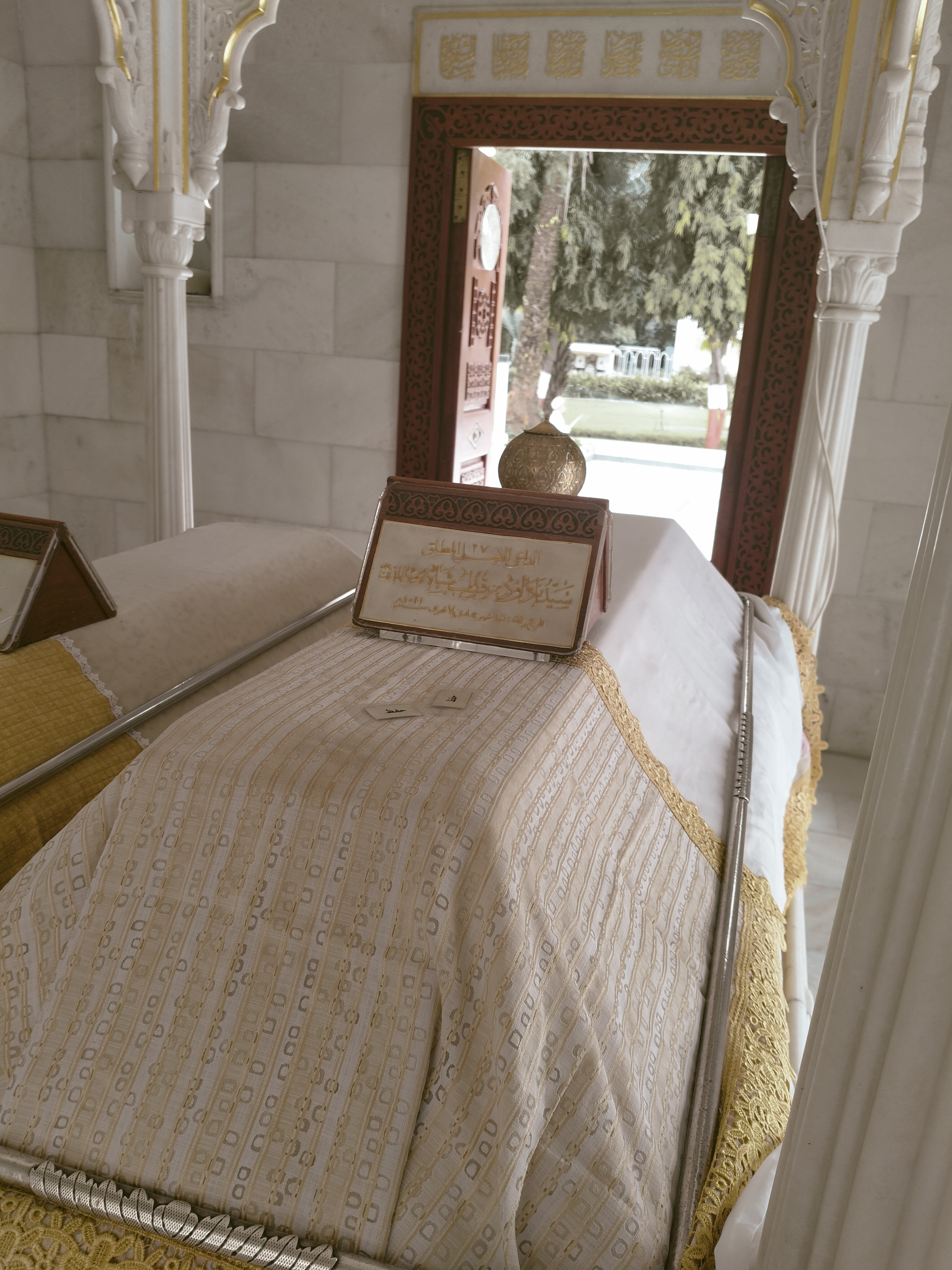
Grave 27th dai Syedna Dawood bin Kutub shah

Shia Islam titles
Dawood Bin Qutubshah Dā'ī al-Mutlaq Born: 8 August 1539 Died: died 15 Jumadil Akhir 1021 AH/1612 AD
Preceded by Dawood Bin Ajabshah	27th Dā'ī al-Mutlaq; 1591-1612 AD	Succeeded by Sheikh Aadam Safiuddin
