= Qasim Khan Zainuddin =

31st Dai of the Dawoodi Bohras (died 1646 CE)

Syedna Qasim-Khan Zainuddin 31st Da'i al-Mutlaq of the Dawoodi Bohra
- قاسِم خان زَينُ الدّين
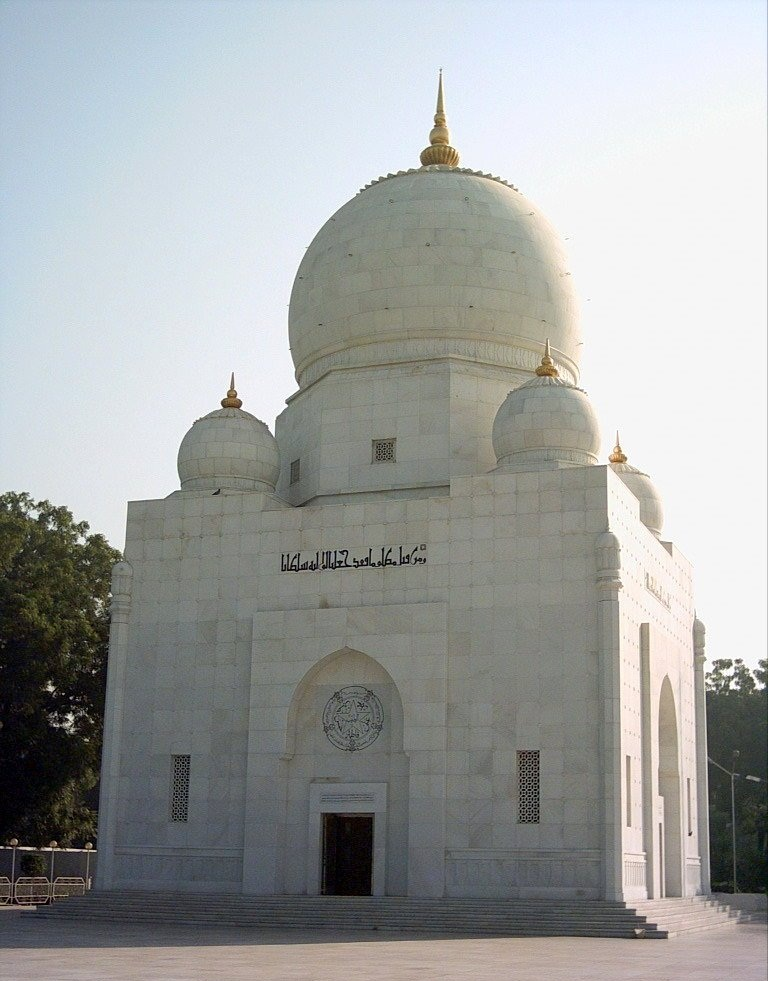
- Mazar-e-Qutbi, Ahmedabad, where Syedna Qasim-Khan is buried.

Da'i al-Mutlaq
- In office 1634 AD (1042 AH) – 1646 AD (1054 AH)
- Preceded by: Ali Shams al-Din IV
- Succeeded by: Qutub Khan Qutbuddin
- Title: Syedna; Maulana; al-Dā'ī al-Mutlaq; al-Dā'ī al-Ajal al-Fātimi
- Died: 1646 CE (1054/56 AH)
- Resting place: Ahmedabad, India

Religious life
- Religion: Islam
- Sect: Isma'ili; Dawoodi Bohra
- Jurisprudence: Mustaali; Tayyabi

Syedna Qasim-Khan Zainuddin was the 31st Dai of the Dawoodi Bohras (died on 23 Jumadil Akhir 1054/56 AH/August 25(?) 1646 CE in Ahmedabad, India). He succeeded the 30th Dai Syedna Ali Shamsuddin to the religious post.

== Life ==
Syedna Zainuddin became Da'i al-Mutlaq in 1056 AH/1646 AD. His period of Dawat was 1042–1054 AH/1634–1646 AD. He served five of his predecessors.

== Lineage ==
Syedna Qasim-Khan's ancestry is traced back to Maulaya Abdullah and Syedi Hasan Feer.

== Burial ==
He is buried in Mazar-e-Qutbi in Ahmedabad.

Shia Islam titles
Qasim Khan Zainuddin Dā'ī al-Mutlaq Died: 1646 AD
Preceded by Ali Shams al-Din IV	31st Dā'ī al-Mutlaq; 1042–1054 AH/ 1634–1646 AD	Succeeded by Qutubuddin Shaheed
