= Callinicus II of Constantinople =

Three-time Ecumenical Patriarch of Constantinople (1688, 1689–1693, 1694–1702)

- Ecumenical Patriarch of Constantinople
- Church: Church of Constantinople
- In office: 3 March – 27 November 1688; 7 March 1689 – July 1693; April 1694 – 8 August 1702
- Predecessor: James of Constantinople; Neophytus IV of Constantinople; Dionysius IV of Constantinople
- Successor: Neophytus IV of Constantinople; Dionysius IV of Constantinople; Gabriel III of Constantinople

Personal details
- Born: 1630 Agrafa, Greece
- Died: 8 August 1702 (aged 71–72)
- Denomination: Eastern Orthodoxy

Callinicus II of Constantinople (Greek: Καλλίνικος; 1630 – 8 August 1702) was Ecumenical Patriarch of Constantinople for three terms (1688, 1689–1693, 1694–1702).

== Notes and references ==
Eastern Orthodox Church titles
Preceded by James (3)	Ecumenical Patriarch of Constantinople; 1688	Succeeded by Neophytus IV
Preceded by Neophytus IV	Ecumenical Patriarch of Constantinople; 1689 – 1693	Succeeded by Dionysius IV (5)
Preceded by Dionysius IV (5)	Ecumenical Patriarch of Constantinople; 1694 – 1702	Succeeded by Gabriel III
