= Abduttayyeb Zakiuddin I =

Syedna Abduttayyeb Zakiuddin 29th Da'i al-Mutlaq of the Dawoodi Bohra
- عبدُالطّيّب زكي الدين
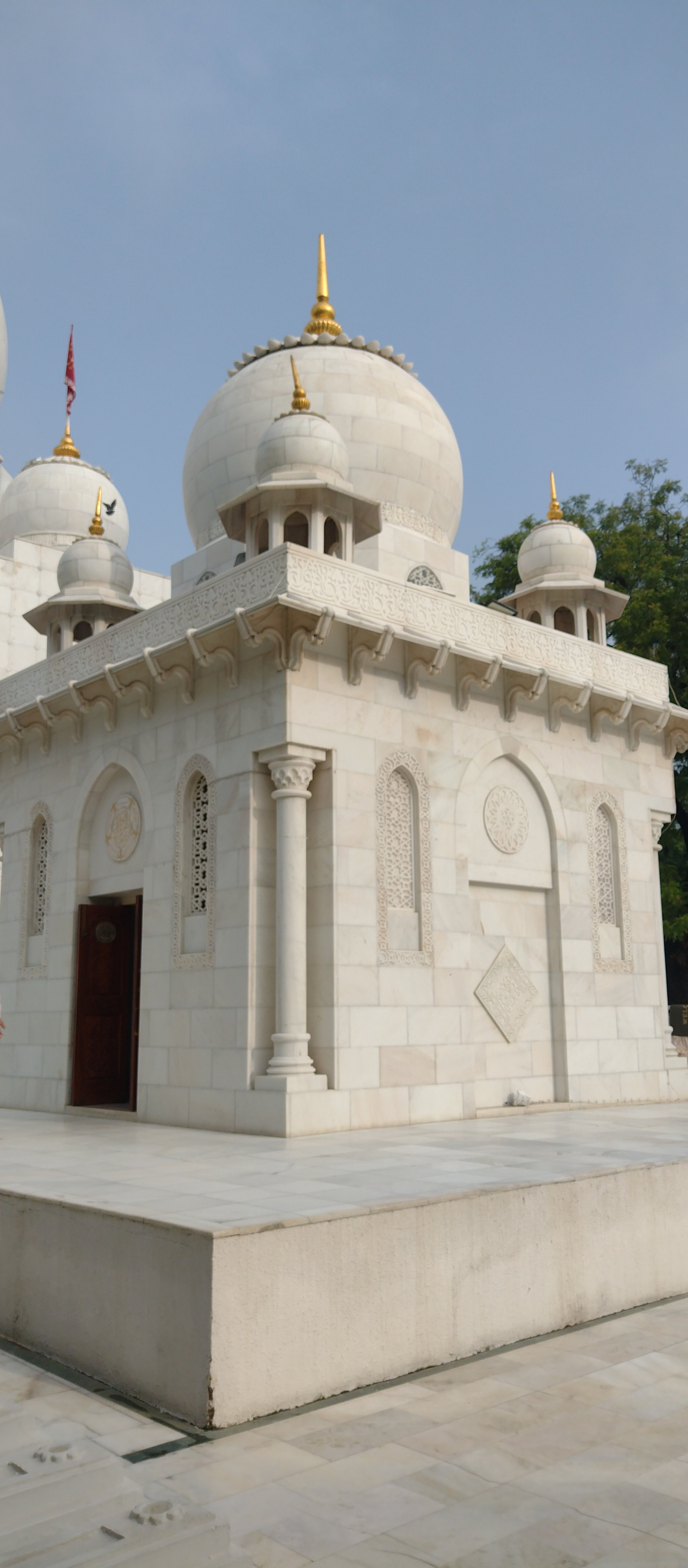

Da'i al-Mutlaq
- In office 1622 AD (1030 AH) – 1633 AD (1041 AH)
- Preceded by: Sheikh Adam Safiuddin
- Succeeded by: Ali Shams al-Din IV
- Title: Syedna; Maulana; Da'i al-Mutlaq; Da'i al-Fatemi
- Resting place: Ahmedabad, India
- Parents: Syedna Dawood Bin Qutubshah (father); Raani AaiSaheba (mother)

Religious life
- Religion: Islam
- Sect: Isma'ili; Dawoodi Bohra
- Jurisprudence: Mustaali; Tayyabi

Syedna Abduttayyeb Zakiuddin (died 2 Rabi-ul-Awwal 1041 AH/1633 AD; born 8 Safar-ul-Muzaffar 972 AH/15 September 1564 AD, Ahmedabad, India) was the 29th Da'i al-Mutlaq of the Dawoodi Bohra. He succeeded the 28th Dai, Syedna Sheikh Adam Safiuddin to the religious post.

== Family ==
Syedna Abduttayyeb Zakiuddin was born in 1564. His father was Syedna Dawood Bin Qutubshah while his mother was Raani Aai Saheba binte Ali bin Jivabhai. He had two brothers: 32nd Dai Syedna Qutub Khan Qutubuddin, Miya Khan-ji and a sister called Habiba.

== Life ==
It was during his tenure that a dissident sect was formed called Alavi Bohras led by Ali bin Ibrahim, grandson of Syedna Sheikh Adam Safiuddin.

== Succession ==
Syedna Zakiuddin appointed (declared nass on) Syedna Ali Shamsuddin to be his successor.

== Mausoleum ==
Syedna Mohammed Burhanuddin dedicated a new mausoleum in 1996. The inner walls are ornamented with verses of the Quran in Kufic script and inlaid with rubies.

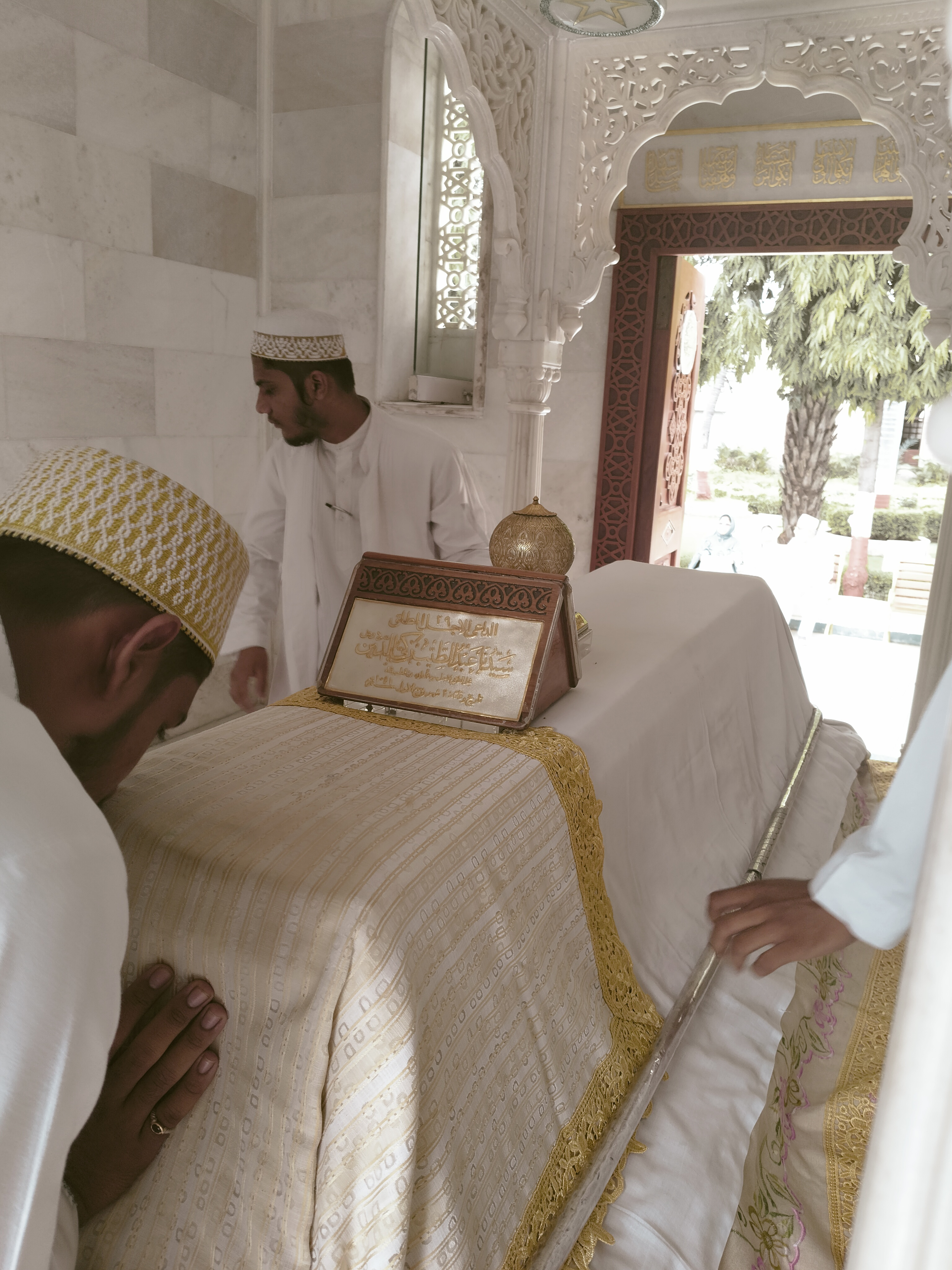
Grave Syedna Abduttayeb Zakiyuddin, Ahmedabad

Shia Islam titles
Abduttayyeb Zakiuddin I Dā'ī al-Mutlaq Born: 15 September 1564 AD Died: 2 Rabi-ul-Awwal 1041 AH/1633 AD
| Preceded by Sheikh Aadam Safiuddin | 29th Dā'ī al-Mutlaq; 1030–1041 AH/1622–1633 AD | Succeeded by Ali Shamshuddin |
