= Neophytus IV of Constantinople =

Ecumenical Patriarch of Constantinople from 1688 to 1689

- Ecumenical Patriarch of Constantinople
- Church: Church of Constantinople
- In office: 27 November 1688 – 7 March 1689
- Predecessor: Callinicus II of Constantinople
- Successor: Callinicus II of Constantinople

Personal details
- Died: After 1689
- Denomination: Eastern Orthodoxy

Neophytus IV of Constantinople (Greek: Νεόφυτος; died after 1689) was Ecumenical Patriarch of Constantinople (27 November 1688 – 7 March 1689). He was previously bishop of Adrianople.

== Bibliography ==
- Οικουμενικό Πατριαρχείο
- Εγκυκλοπαίδεια Μείζονος Ελληνισμού

Eastern Orthodox Church titles
Preceded by Callinicus II	Ecumenical Patriarch of Constantinople; 1688 – 1689	Succeeded by Callinicus II (2)
