= Seraphim I of Constantinople =

Ecumenical Patriarch of Constantinople from 1733 to 1734

- Ecumenical Patriarch of Constantinople
- Church: Church of Constantinople
- Installed: March 1733
- Term ended: September 1734
- Predecessor: Jeremias III of Constantinople
- Successor: Neophytus VI of Constantinople

Personal details
- Denomination: Eastern Orthodoxy

Seraphim I of Constantinople (Ancient Greek: Σεραφείμ; fl. 18th century) served as Ecumenical Patriarch of Constantinople in 1733–1734 in succession to Jeremias III of Constantinople. He was succeeded by Neophutus VI.

He proclaimed Mark of Ephesus a saint during his tenure.

== Bibliography ==
- List of Patriarchs on the official website of the Ecumenical Patriarchate

Eastern Orthodox Church titles
Preceded by Jeremias III	Ecumenical Patriarch of Constantinople; 1733 – 1734	Succeeded by Neophytus VI
