= Cyril IV of Constantinople =

Ecumenical Patriarch of Constantinople from 1711 to 1713

- Ecumenical Patriarch of Constantinople
- Church: Church of Constantinople
- Diocese: Constantinople
- See: Ecumenical Patriarchate
- Installed: December 1711
- Term ended: November 1713
- Predecessor: Athanasius V of Constantinople
- Successor: Cyprianus of Constantinople

Personal details
- Born: Mytilene
- Died: 1728 Constantinople
- Denomination: Eastern Orthodox Church

Cyril IV of Constantinople (Greek: Κύριλλος; died 1728) was the Ecumenical Patriarch of Constantinople from December 1711 until his resignation in November 1713. He was also metropolitan bishop of Cyzicus.

He was elected patriarch in 1709 but took office only after Athanasius V of Constantinople was deposed. He resigned in 1713 and remained in Constantinople until his death in 1728.

== Notes and references ==
Eastern Orthodox Church titles
| Preceded by Athanasius V | Ecumenical Patriarch of Constantinople; 1711 – 1713 | Succeeded by Cyprianus (2) |
