= Ali Shams al-Din IV =

Yemeni religious leader

Syedna Ali Shamsuddin 30th Da'i al-Mutlaq of the Dawoodi Bohra
- علي شمس الدّين
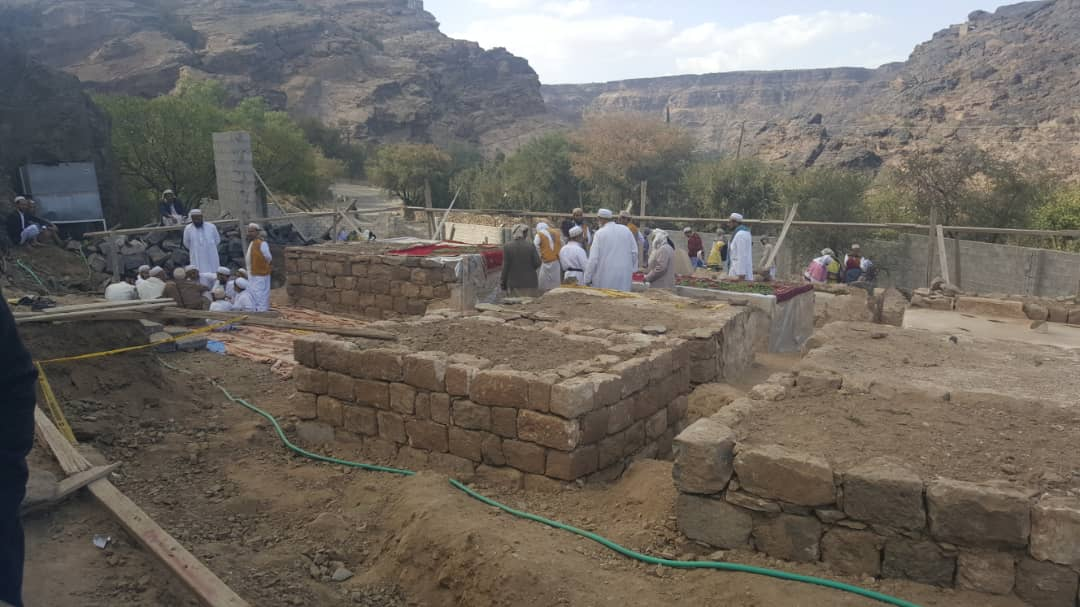
- The place at Hisn-e-Af'edah where Syedna Ali Shamsuddin is buried.

Da'i al-Mutlaq
- In office 1633 AD (1041 AH) – 1634 AD (1042 AH)
- Preceded by: Abduttayyeb Zakiuddin
- Succeeded by: Qasim Khan Zainuddin
- Title: Syedna; Maulana; Da'i al-Mutlaq; Da'i al-Fatemi
- Died: Yemen
- Resting place: Hisn-e-Af'edah, Yemen
- Parents: Syedi Hasan bin Idrees (father); Na'ama BaiSaheba (mother)

Religious life
- Religion: Islam
- Sect: Isma'ili; Dawoodi Bohra
- Jurisprudence: Mustaali; Tayyabi

Syedna Ali Shamsuddin bin Maulaya Hasan was the 30th Dai of the Dawoodi Bohras (died 25 Rabi-ul-akhir 1042 AH or 1634 AD, Yemen). He succeeded the 29th Dai Syedna Abduttayyeb Zakiuddin to the religious post. Syedna Shamsuddin became Da'i al-Mutlaq in 1041 AH (1633 AD). His period of Dawat was 1041–1042 AH (1633–1634 AD).

== Family ==
Syedna Ali Shamsuddin was the son of Syedi Hasan bin Idris. Syedna Ali's mother was Na'ama baisaheba, daughter of Syedi Hasan bin Nooh Bharuchi. Syedna Ali resided in Yemen and led da'wat from there. He is buried in Hisn-e-Af'eda, Yemen.

== Succession ==
Syedna Ali Shamsuddin appointed Syedna Qasim Khan Zainuddin as the next Da'i.

Shia Islam titles
Ali Shams al-Din IV Dā'ī al-Mutlaq Died: Yemen
Preceded by Abduttayyeb Zakiuddin	30th Dā'ī al-Mutlaq; 1041–1042 AH/1633–1634 AD	Succeeded by Kasim Khan Zainuddin
