= Sheikh Adam Safiuddin =

Syedna Sheikh-Adam Safiyuddin 28th Da'i al-Mutlaq of the Dawoodi Bohra
- شيخ ادم صفي الدين
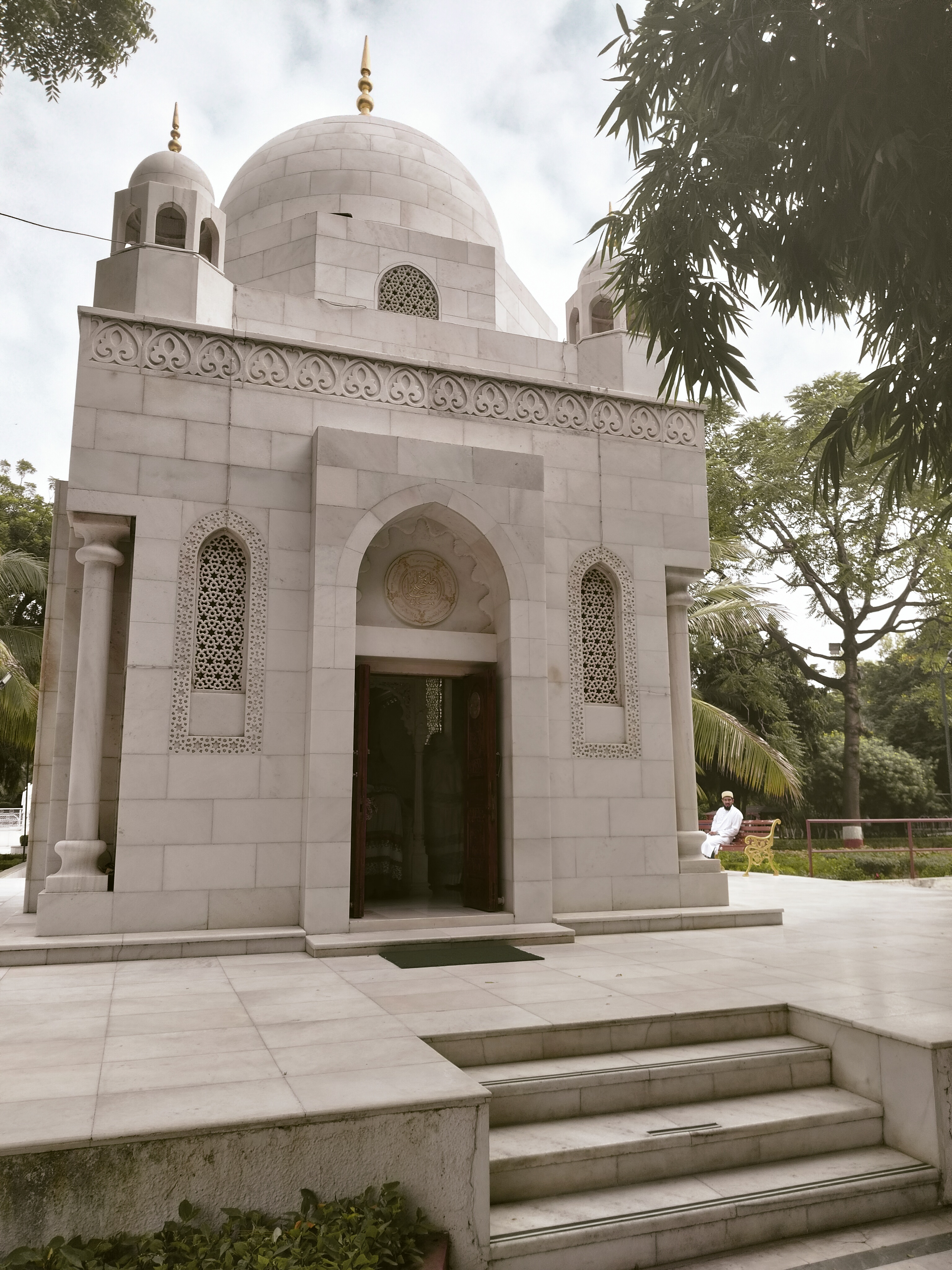
- mausoleum of Syedna Sheikh-Adam Safiyuddin

Da'i al-Mutlaq
- In office 1612 AD (1021 AH) – 1622 AD (1030 AH)
- Preceded by: Dawood Bin Qutubshah
- Succeeded by: Abduttayyeb Zakiuddin I (According to Dawoodi Bohra); Ali bin Ibrahim bin Sheikh Adam Safiuddin (According to Alavi Bohras)
- Title: Syedna; Maulana; Da'i al-Mutlaq; Da'i al-Fatemi

Personal life
- Born: 1548 AD Vadodara
- Died: 1622 AD (1030 AH)
- Resting place: Ahmedabad, India
- Parent: Tayyeb Shah (father)

Religious life
- Religion: Islam
- Sect: Isma'ili; Tayyibi
- Jurisprudence: Mustaali

Syedna Sheikh Adam Safiuddin (died on 7 Rajab 1030 AH AH/1622 AD; born on 6th Jumad-il-Akhar [1548], Ahmedabad, India) was the 28th Da'i al-Mutlaq (Absolute Missionary) of the Tayyibi sect of Musta‘lī Islam. He succeeded the 27th Dai Syedna Dawood Bin Qutubshah to the religious post.

== Life ==
Syedna Sheikh Adam was born in 1548 in Vadodara. His father's name was Tayyeb Shah. Syedna Sheikh Adam obtained elementary education in Vadodara and went to Ahmedabad to pursue further education. He further studied in Yemen under Syedna Yusuf Najmuddin ibn Sulaiman. After the death of Syedna Yusuf, Syedna Sheikh Adam returned to India and served under Syedna Dawood Bin Ajabshah who sent him to Deccan Plateau to review affairs. One of the most noteworthy service was to debate Sulayman bin Hasan claims.

== Succession ==
His tenure lasted 9 years and 21 days and is buried in Ahmedabad. As per the Dawoodi Bohra faction, Syedna Sheikh Adam Safiuddin appointed or gave nass to Syedna Abduttayyeb Zakiuddin.

== Gallery ==
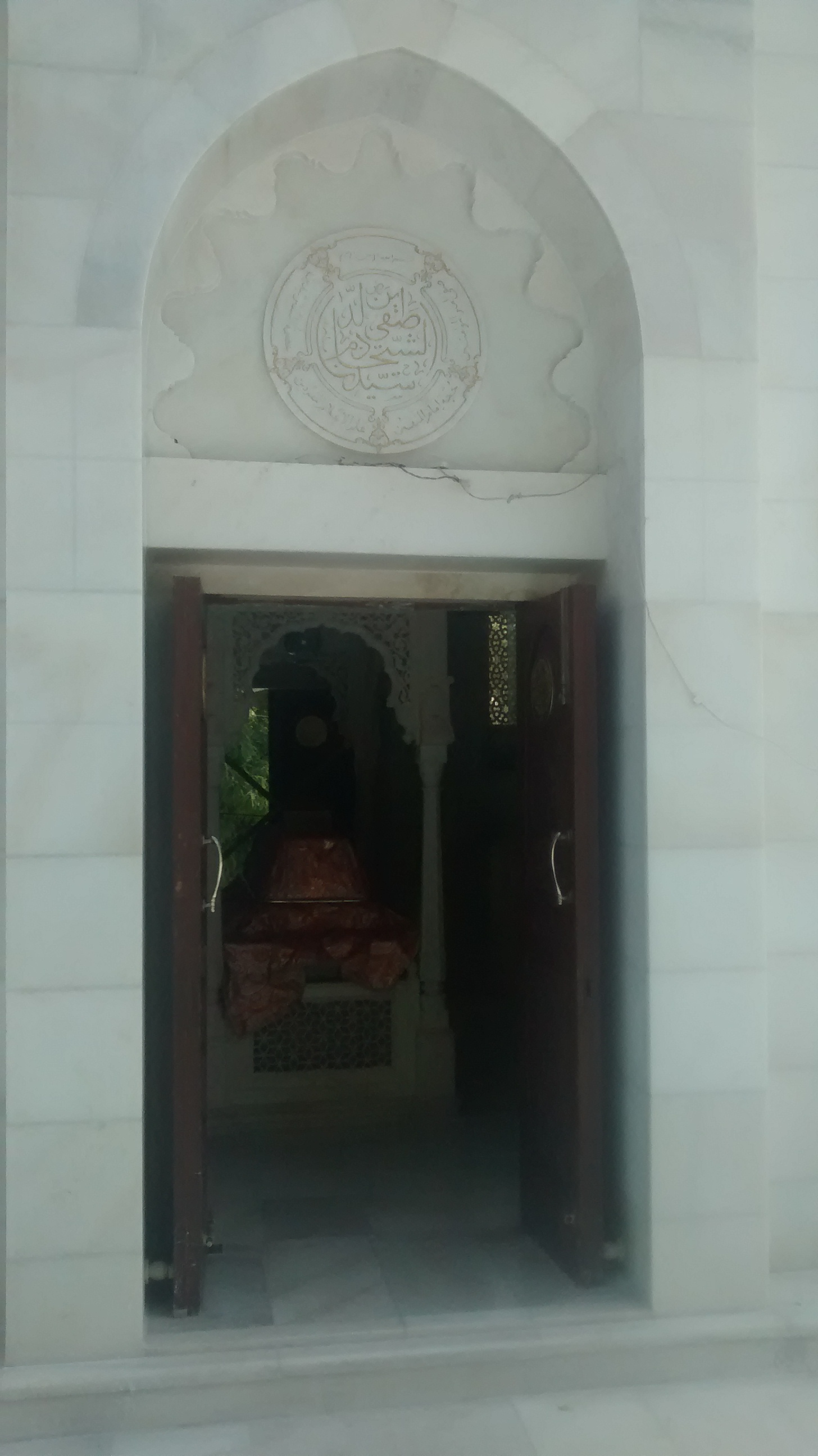
Entry gate with Grave visible, 28th dai Syedna Sheikh Adam Safiuddin

Shia Islam titles
Sheikh Adam Safiuddin Dā'ī al-Mutlaq Born: 1548 AD Died: 1622 AD (1030 AH)
Preceded by Dawood Bin Qutubshah	28th Dā'ī al-Mutlaq; 1021–1030 AH/ 1612–1622 AD	Succeeded by Abduttayyeb Zakiuddin
