= Kōsokabe Chikayasu =

Japanese samurai

- 香宗我部親泰

Lord of Aki Castle
- In office 1569–1585

Personal details
- Born: 1543 Okō Castle, Tosa Province
- Died: 1593 (aged 49–50) Nagato Province
- Relations: Chōsokabe Kunichika (father); Kōsokabe Chikahide (adopted father); Chōsokabe Motochika (Older brother)

Military service
- Allegiance: Chosokabe clan Toyotomi clan
- Unit: Kōsokabe Clan
- Commands: Aki Castle
- Battles/wars: Battle of Yanagare (1569); Battle of Shimantogawa (1575); Battle of Nakatomigawa (1582); Battle of Hiketa (1583); Invasion of Shikoku (1585); Kyushu Campaign (1587); Korean Campaign (1592)

Kōsokabe Chikayasu (香宗我部親泰; 1543 – 1593), third son of Chōsokabe Kunichika who was adopted by the Kōsokabe Clan in 1558 was a Japanese samurai of the Sengoku period, who served the Chōsokabe clan. He was the castle lord in command of Aki Castle. Throughout Chikayasu's life, he led many an army throughout his older brother Motochika's campaigns in Shikoku and contributing to the expansion of the domain of the Chōsokabe clan.

== Biography ==
Chikayasu was the third son of Chosokabe Kunichika and a younger brother of Chosokabe Motochika. He was adopted by Kosokabe Chikahide in 1558 and following the defeat of the Aki family at Battle of Yanagare in 1569, he was given Aki castle.

He went on to serve Motochika loyally throughout his career. In 1575, he fought at the Battle of Shimantogawa (Battle of Watarigawa) against Ichijo family. He played a notable role in the Chosokabe victory at the Battle of Nakatomigawa in 1582 and captured Tsu castle, afterwards being given Tomioka castle in Awa province.

He was known as a diplomat as well as warrior, and worked at arranging a Chosokabe-Oda alliance. He sent messages to Oda Nobuo and Tokugawa Ieyasu when the latter two were facing Toyotomi Hideyoshi in 1584. After these endeavors, his talents became widely known.

In 1585, with his brother Chōsokabe Motochika, Chikayasu fought in the Invasion of Shikoku against Hideyoshi's forces.

In 1587, Chikayasu participated in the Toyotomi Hideyoshi Kyushu Campaign against Shimazu clan.

In 1592, Chikayasu participated in the First Hideyoshi's invasions of Korea, along with his brother Chōsokabe Motochika.

== Death ==
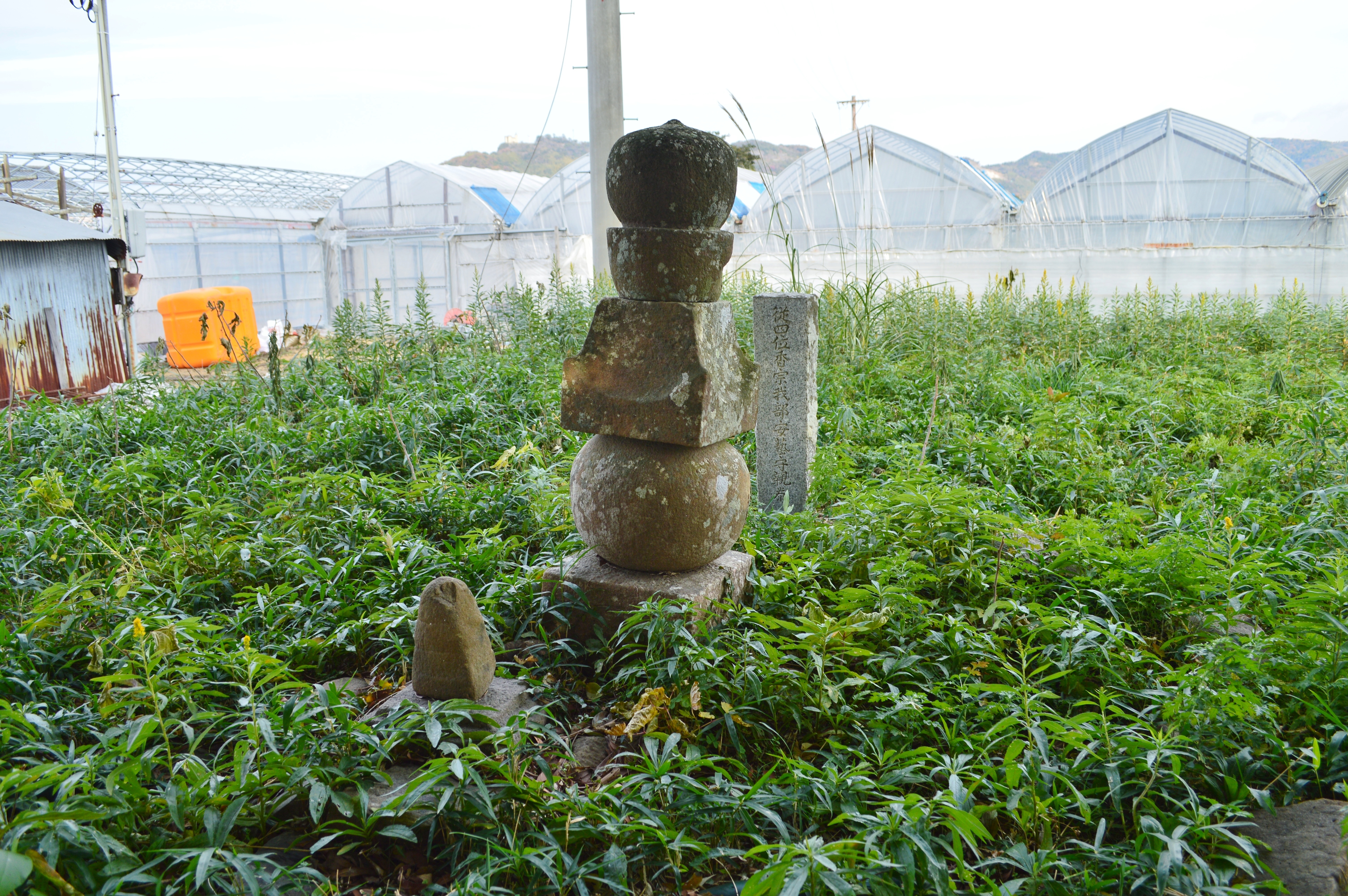
Tomb of Kōsokabe Chikayasu

Chikayasu died of illness in Nagato province en route to join the Korean Campaign in 1593. His eldest son Chikauji had also died of illness the previous year.

The death of Chikayasu was a significant blow to the Chōsokabe clan. He was an alter ego of Motochika, engaged in battles across Shikoku. His younger son, Sadachika, left Tosa province following the Sekigahara Campaign and settled in Shimôsa province.
