= Aki Castle =

14th century castle in Kochi, Japan

- 安芸城
- Aki, Kōchi Prefecture, Japan
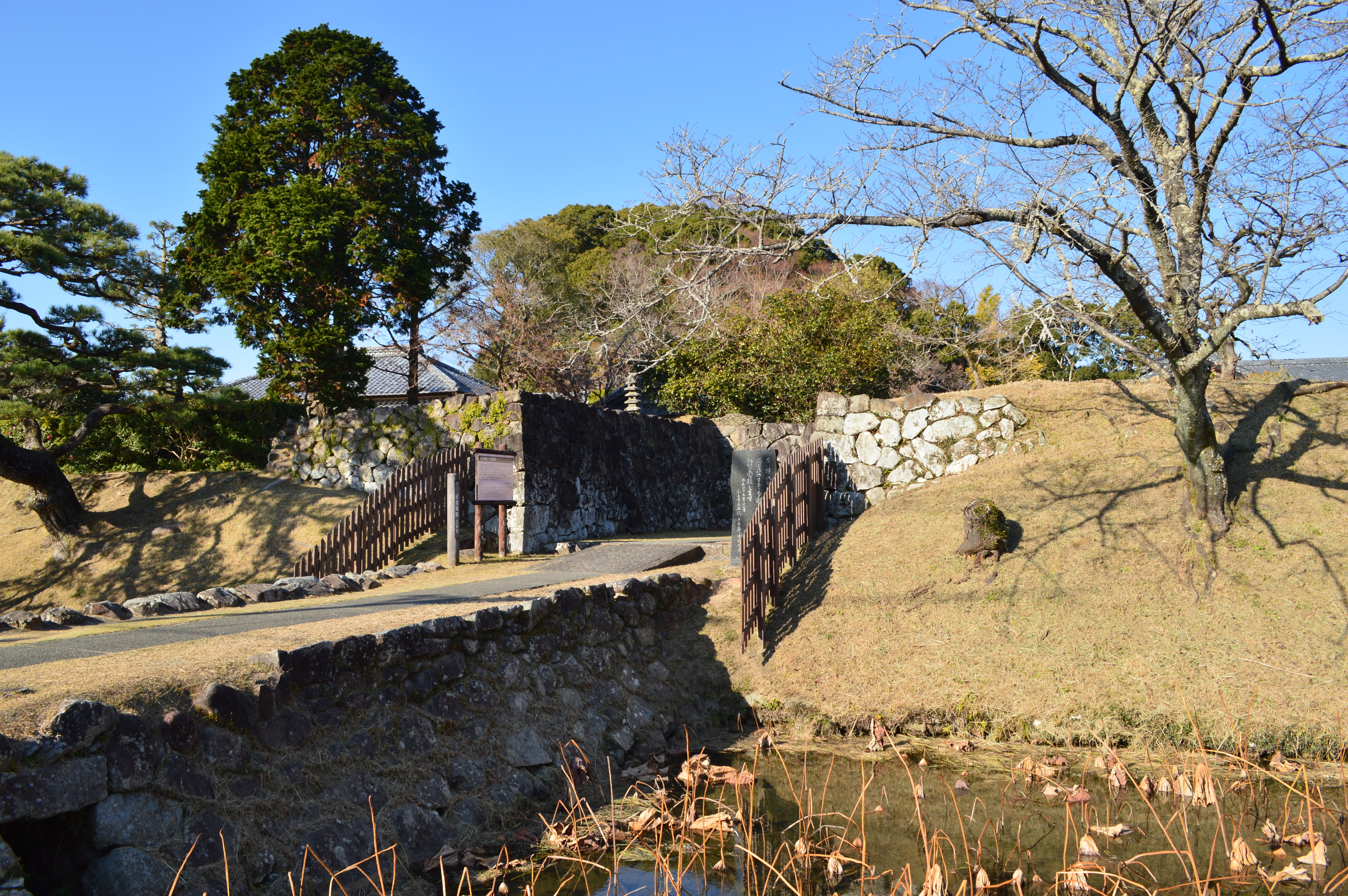
- Stone wall and water moat of Aki castle

Site information
- Type: Hirayama-style castle
- Owner: Aki clan, Chōsokabe clan, Goto clan
- Condition: ruins

Location
- Coordinates: 33.31101°N 133.5445°E

Site history
- Built: 1308
- Built by: Aki Chikauji

Garrison information
- Past commanders: Aki Kunitora, Kōsokabe Chikayasu, Goto Tameshige

Aki Castle (安芸城, Aki-jō) was a castle of the Aki clan in what is now the city of Aki, Kōchi Prefecture, Japan. Ruins still remain and the site was designated an Aki City Historic Site. It is believed the castle was built by Aki Chikauji in 1308.

In 1569, the castle was besieged by Chōsokabe Motochika's force. Aki Kunitora, who was known as one of the seven great samurai of the Aki, entrenched himself in the castle, but later surrendered and committed seppuku. Following the fall of the castle, Motochika appointed his younger brother Kōsokabe Chikayasu as the lord of the castle and the castle became an important base for the Chōsokabe clan to invade Awa.

After the Battle of Sekigahara, Tosa Province was given to Yamanouchi Kazutoyo and he appointed his senior vassal Goto Tameshige as the lord of the castle.

The castle is now in ruins, with low some stone walls, wet moats, and ramparts or other earthworks. The Aki City Historical Museum is on site. Adjacent to the castle is the preserved samurai residential district of Doi Kachū. Doi Kachū was designated a Group of Traditional Buildings of Japan in 2012.

== Gallery ==
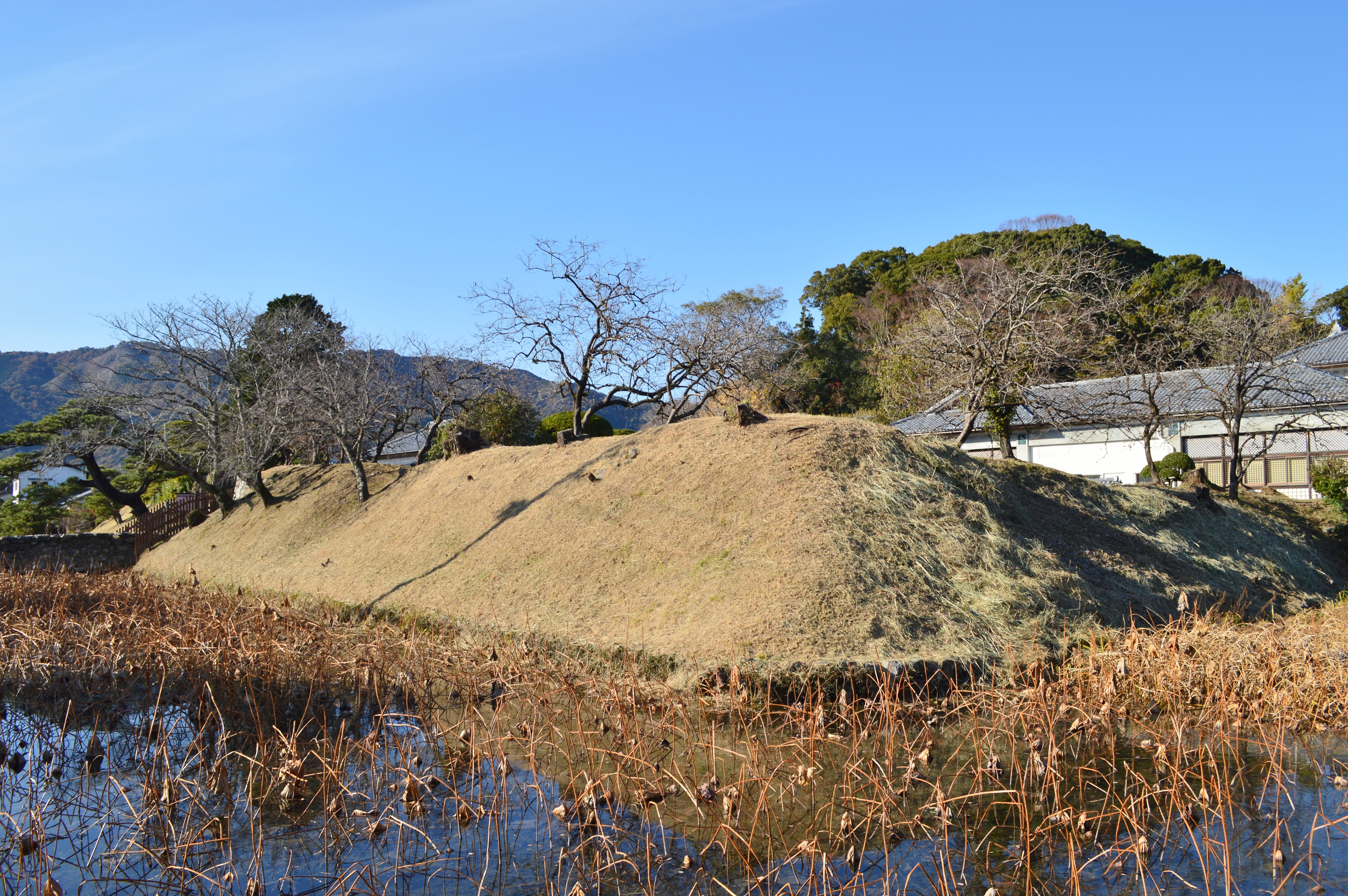
Aki Castle

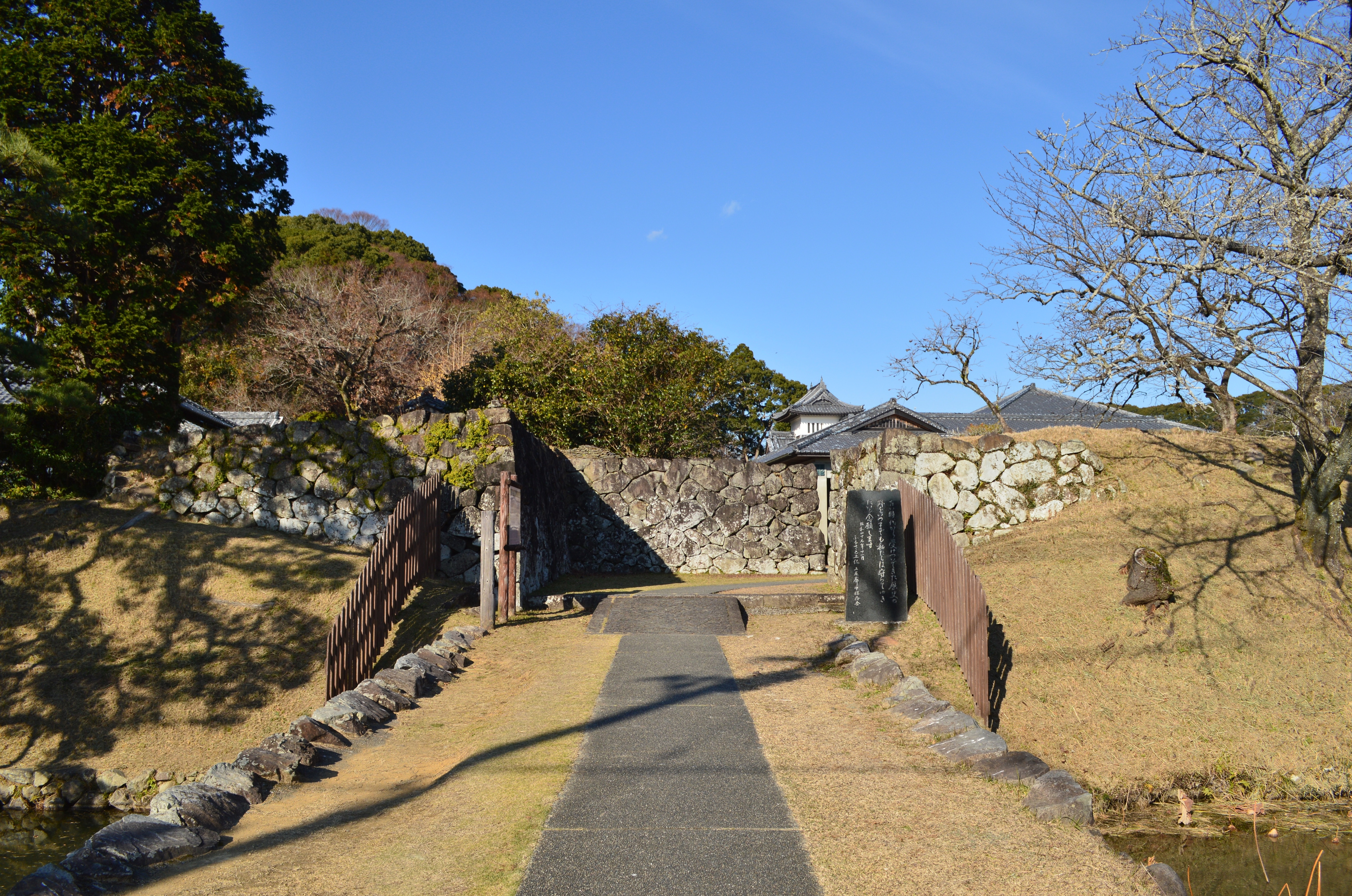
Former main gate of Aki castle

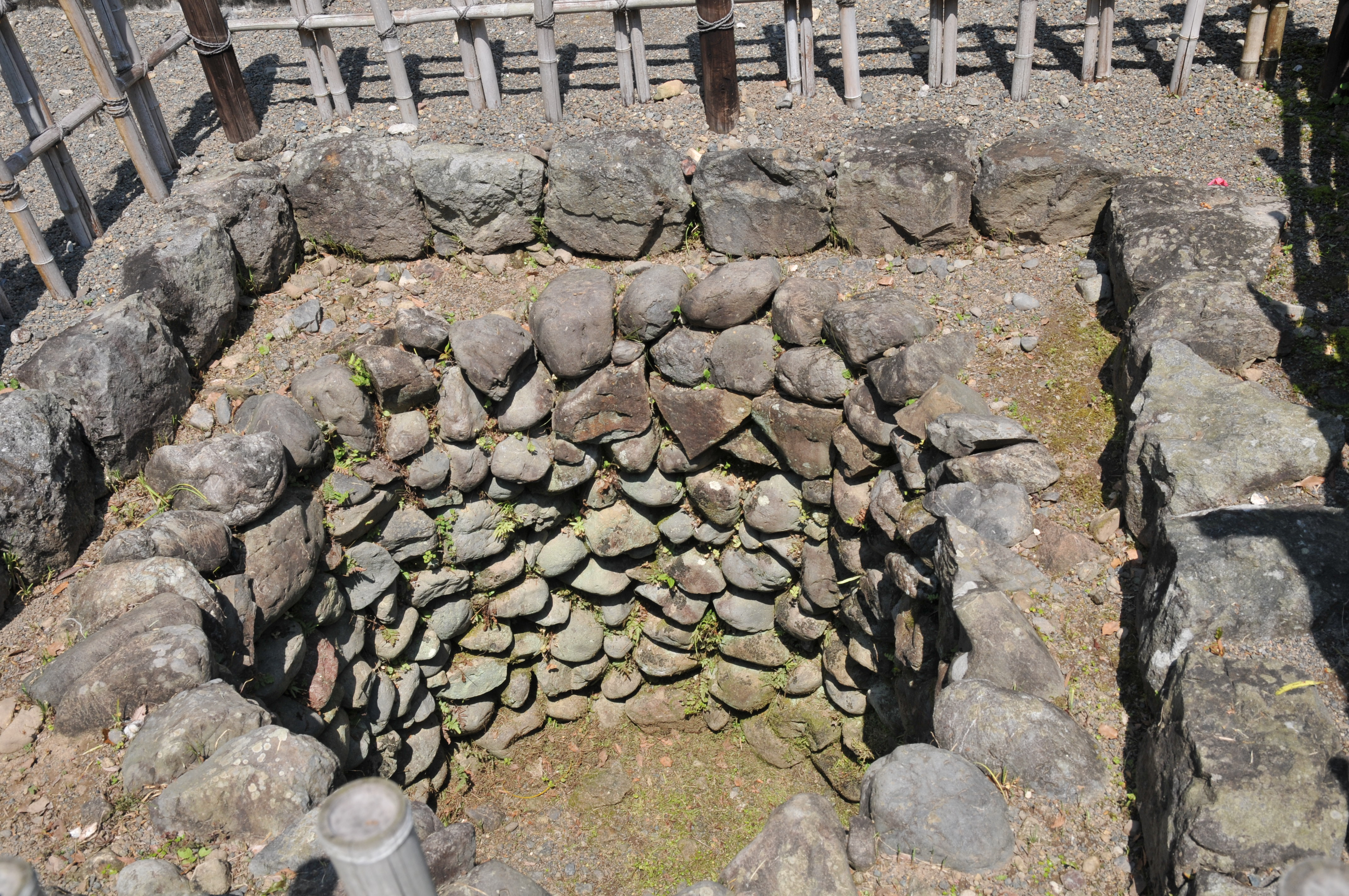
Well

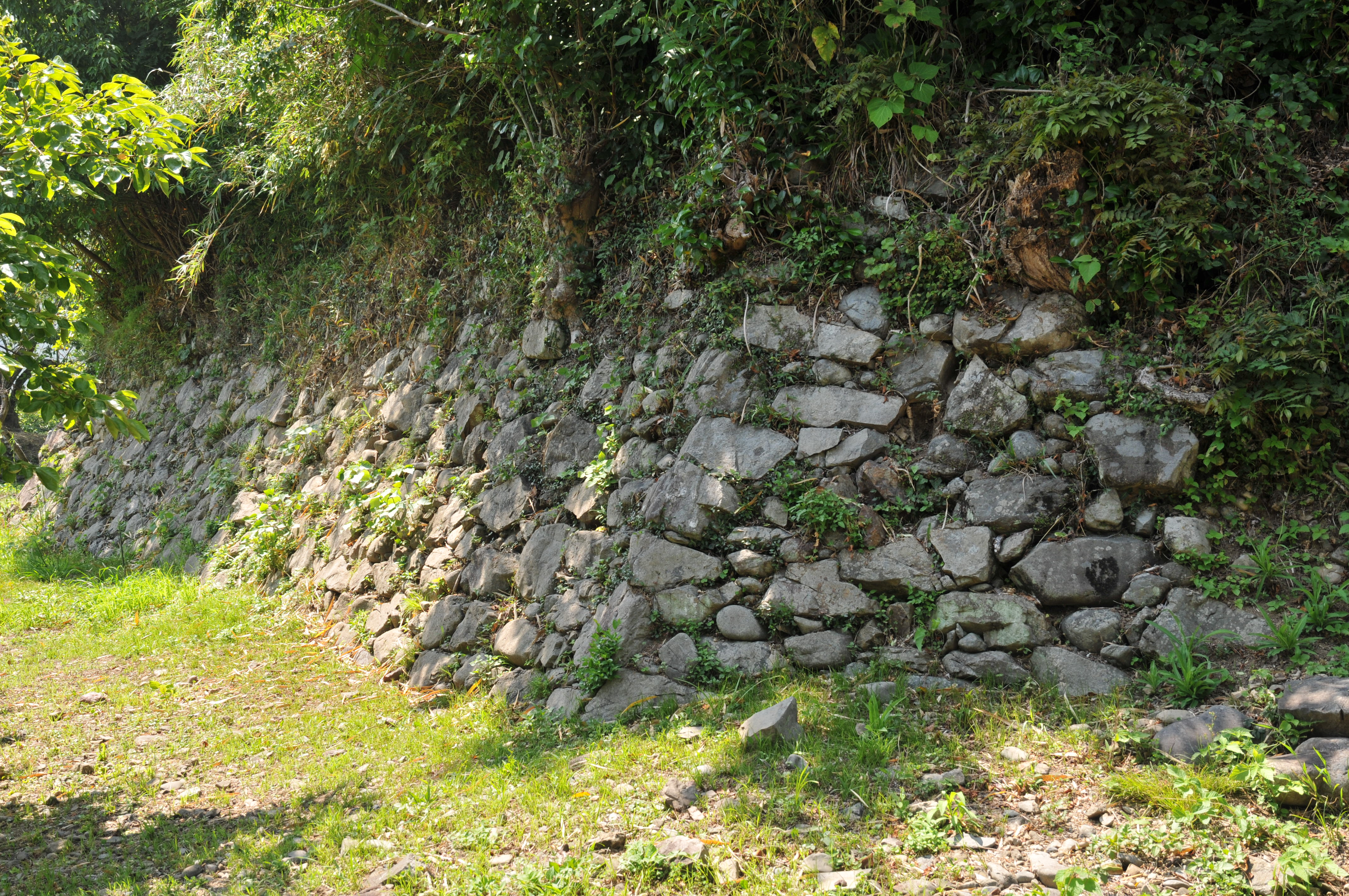
Stone wall

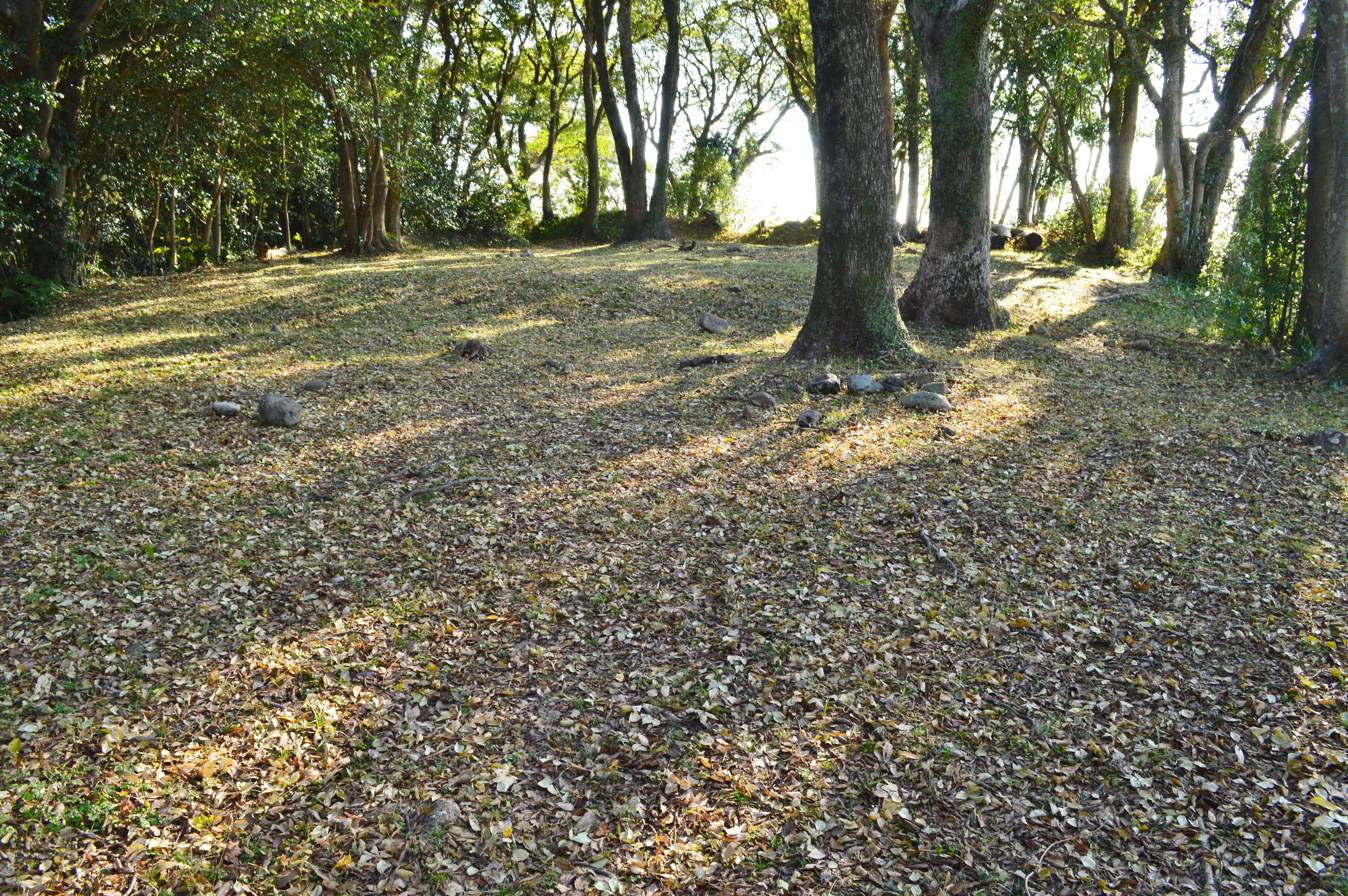
Ichino-dan compound

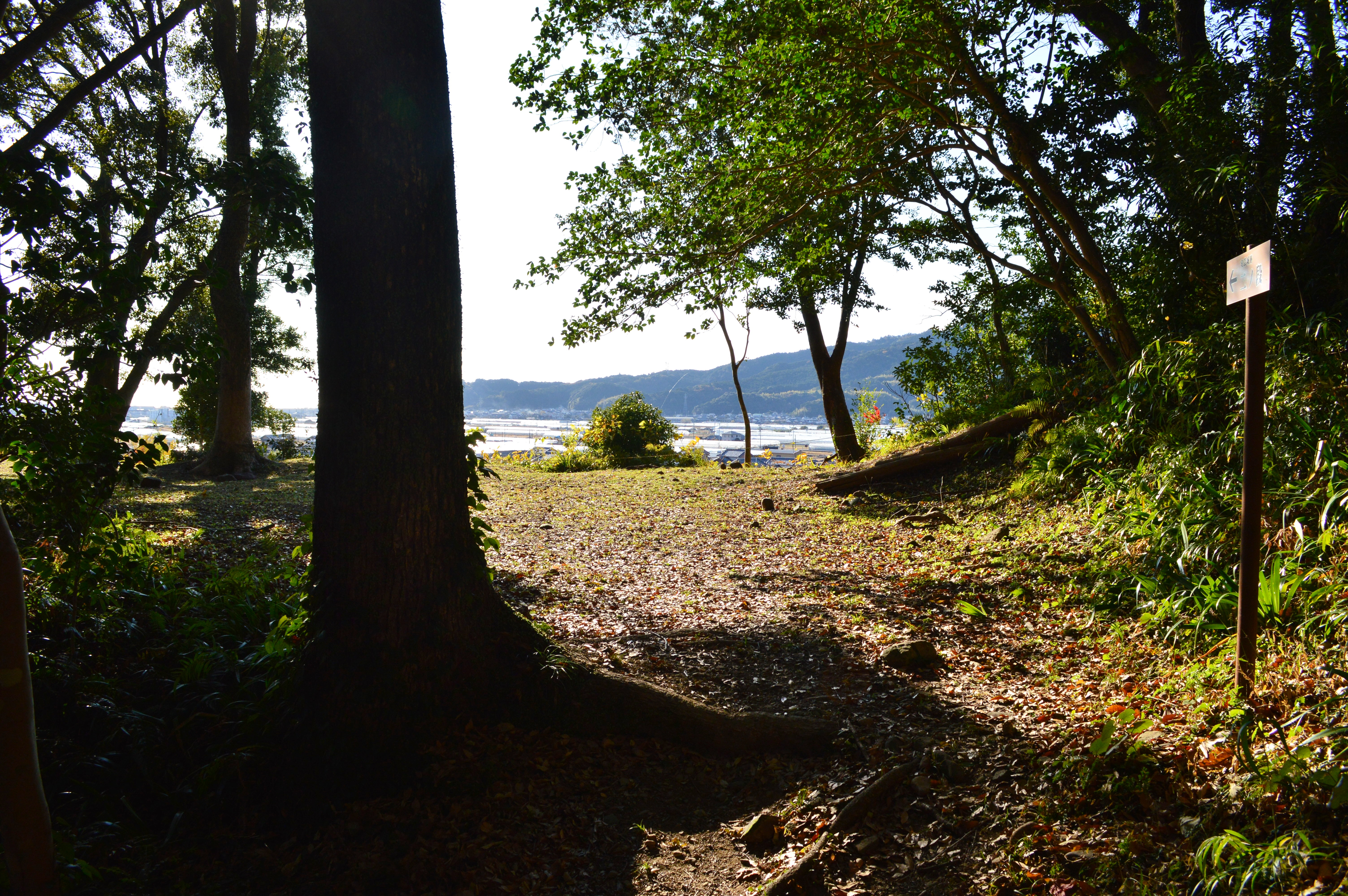
Nino-dan compound

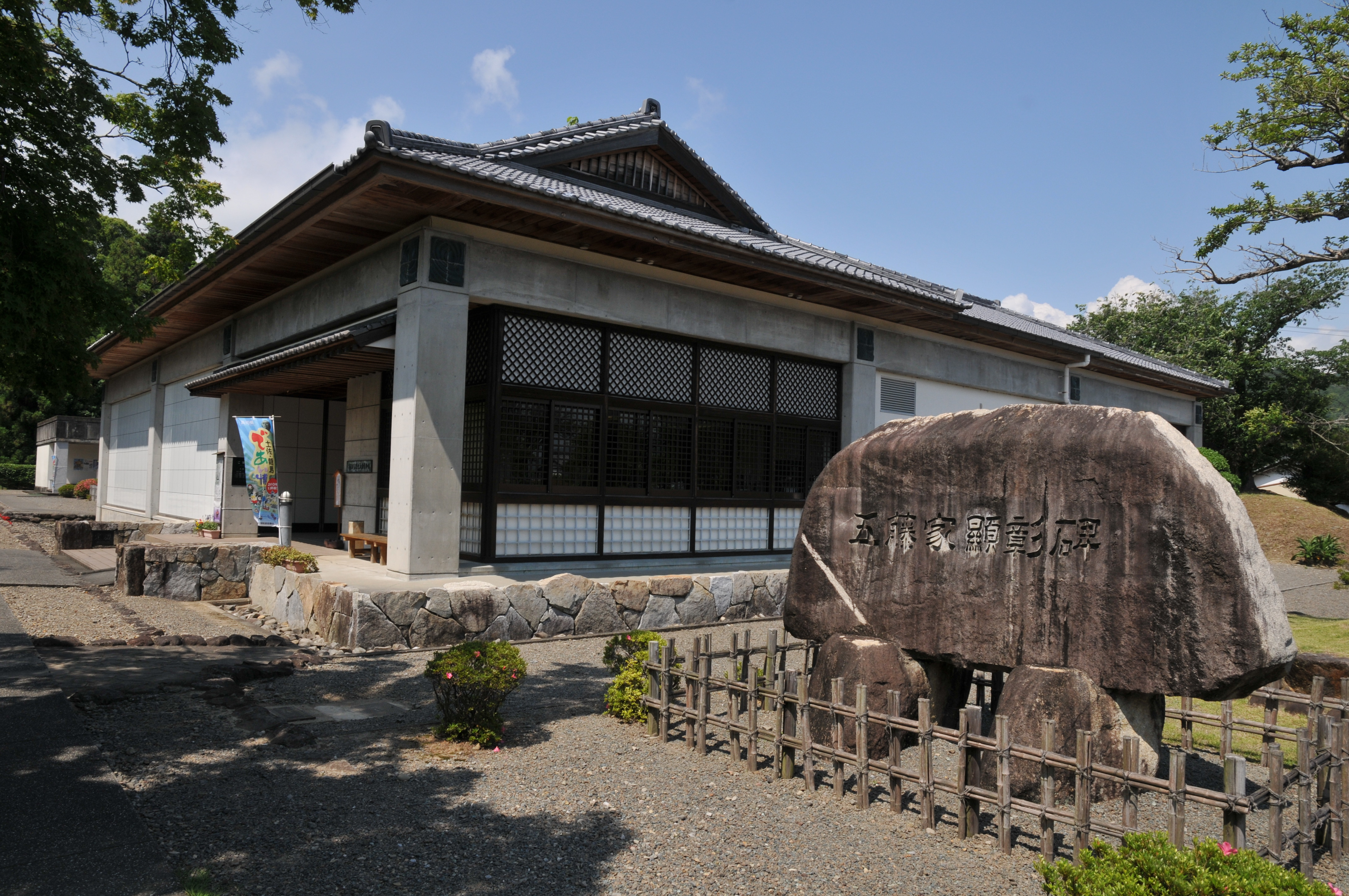
Museum of History

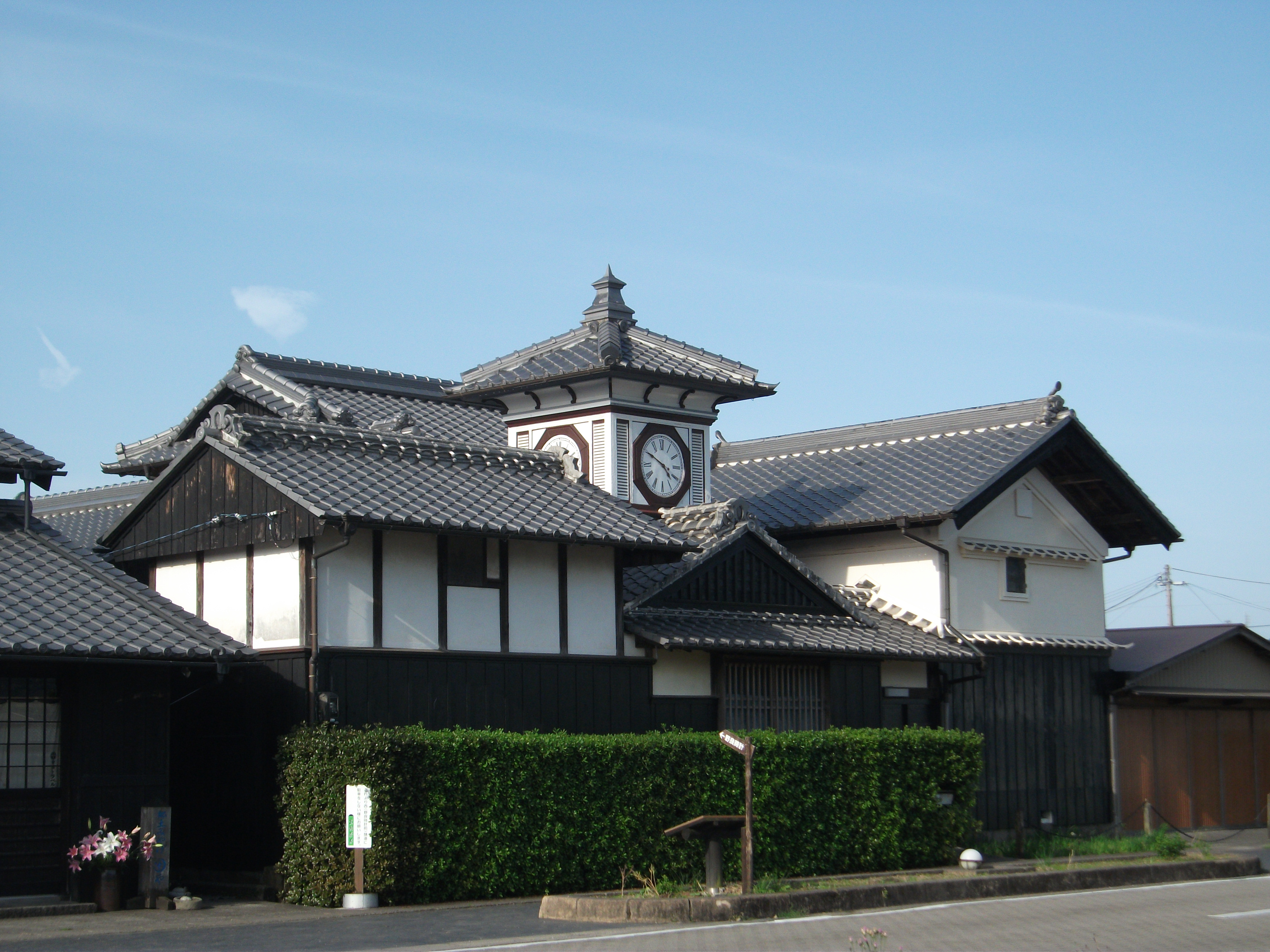
Doikachu2

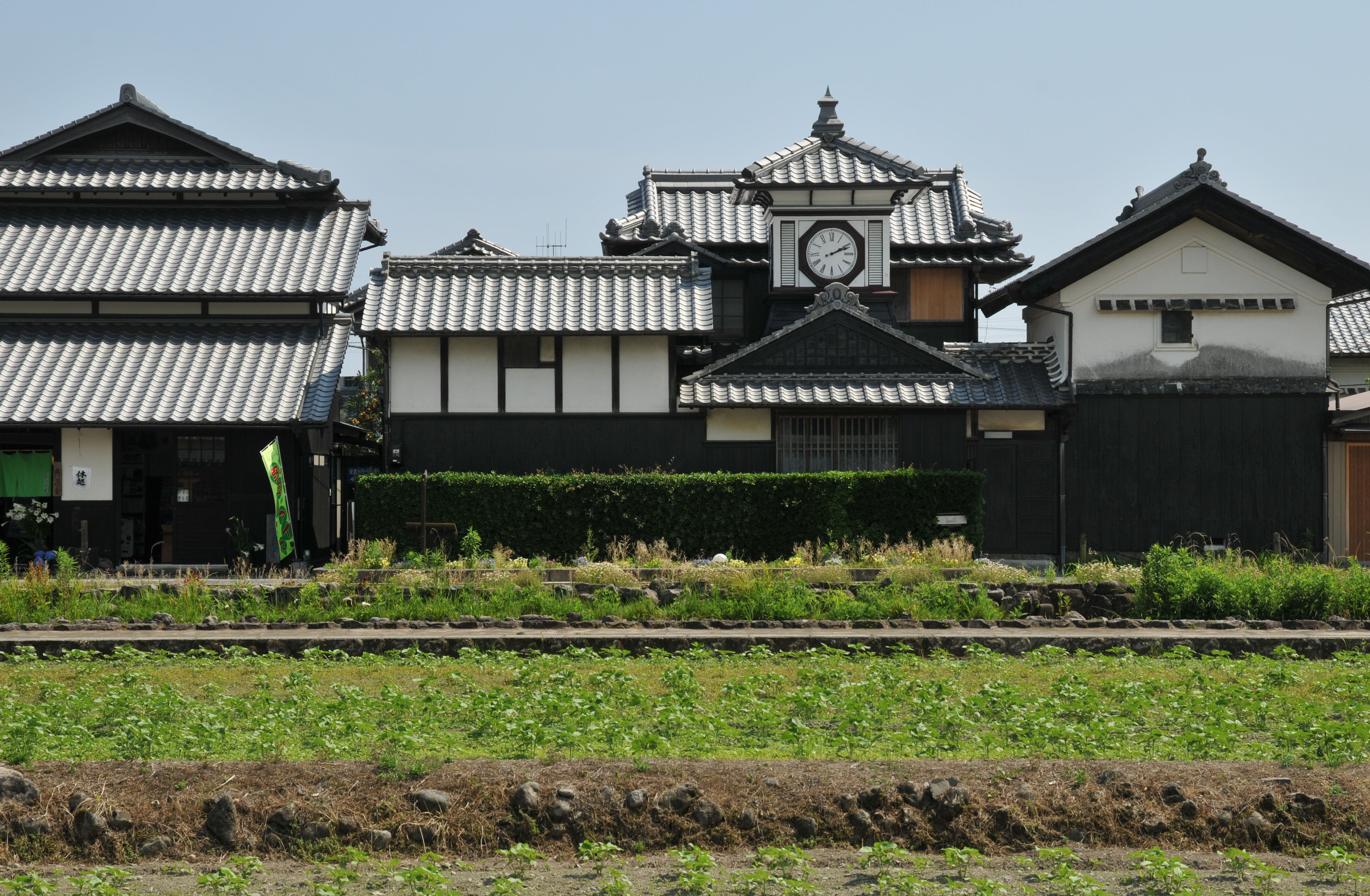
Doikachu3

== See also ==
- List of historic sites of Japan (Kōchi)
