= Battle of Nakatomigawa =

- Part of Sengoku period
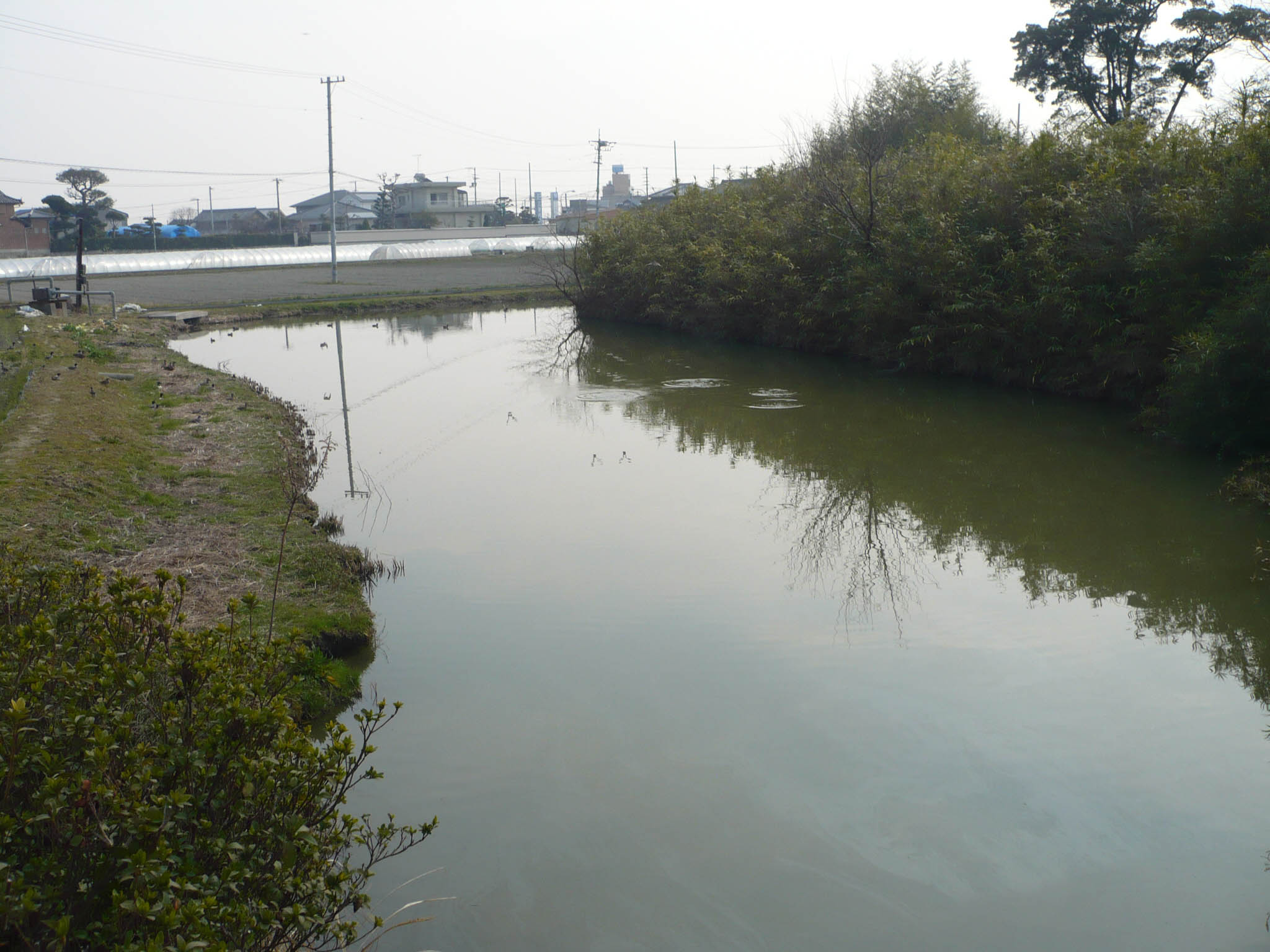
- Water Moat of Shozui Castle
Date	August 27–28, 1582
Location	Nakatomigawa, Awa Province (Tokushima), Shikoku 34°08′03″N 134°31′01″E
Result	Chōsokabe victory

Belligerents
forces of Chōsokabe Motochika	Miyoshi clan

Commanders and leaders
Chōsokabe Motochika; Kōsokabe Chikayasu	Sogō Masayasu

Strength
20,000	5,000

Casualties and losses
600	800
- Location within Tokushima Prefecture Battle of Nakatomigawa (Japan)

The Battle of Nakatomigawa (中富川の戦い) was fought on August 27 to August 28 of 1582 on Shikoku island between the Chōsokabe clan and the Miyoshi clan.

== History ==
The armies met on the banks of the Nakatomigawa on August 27, with the Chōsokabe army of 23,000 men enjoying a clear numerical superiority. The next day Chōsokabe Motochika sent 20,000 of his men against the Miyoshi army across the river and after fierce fighting the Miyoshi were defeated, suffering 800 dead while the Chōsokabe had 600 casualties.
