= Chōsokabe Kunichika =

Japanese Warlord

- 長宗我部 国親

Head of Chōsokabe clan
- In office 1508–1560
- Preceded by: Chōsokabe Kanetsugu
- Succeeded by: Chōsokabe Motochika

Personal details
- Born: 1504 Okō Castle, Tosa Province
- Died: June 15, 1560 (aged 55–56) Okō Castle, Tosa Province
- Relations: Chōsokabe Kanetsugu (father); Chōsokabe Motochika (son); Kōsokabe Chikayasu (son)

Military service
- Commands: Okō Castle
- Battles/wars: Battle of Tonomoto (1560)

Chōsokabe Kunichika (長宗我部 国親; 1504 – 1560) was a powerful warlord in Tosa Province, Japan. He was the son of Chōsokabe Kanetsugu. His childhood name was Senyumaru (千熊丸).

After his father Chōsokabe Kanetsugu was attacked by local lords and he killed himself in the Okō Castle in 1508, Kunichika was raised by the aristocrat Ichijō Fusaie in Tosa Province. Kunichika gave his third son Kōsokabe Chikayasu for adoption to the Kōsokabe Clan in 1558. He reconciled with the Motoya clan and gathered strength.

In 1560, at the Battle of Tonomoto, Chōsokabe Kunichika captured Nagahama castle from the Motoyama clan. In response to this, Motoyama Shigetoki departed Asakura castle with 2,500 men to take the castle back. Kunichika intercepted him with 1,000 troops near Nagahama castle. Kunichika won the Motoyama clan and died soon after, and was succeeded by his son, Chōsokabe Motochika.

== Family ==
- Father: Chōsokabe Kanetsugu
- Wife: Osachi no Kata
- Children:
  - Chōsokabe Motochika by Osachi no Kata
  - Kira Chikasada (1541–1576)
  - Motoyama no Kata married Motoyama Shigetoki
  - Kōsokabe Chikayasu (1543–1593)
  - Shima Chikamasu (d. 1571)
  - daughter married Ike Yorikazu
  - Oyo no Kata married Hakawa Kiyomune
