= Ichiryō gusoku =

The Ichiryō gusoku (一領具足), in Japanese history, were a group of farmer-samurai who served the Chōsokabe clan of Tosa Province. Under the Yamauchi clan, their privileges were reduced, and they became known as gōshi, a status inferior to the Yamauchi clan's retainers.
