= Chōsokabe Motochika =

Japanese Daimyo

- 長宗我部 元親

Head of Chōsokabe clan
- In office 1560–1599
- Preceded by: Chōsokabe Kunichika
- Succeeded by: Chōsokabe Morichika

Personal details
- Born: Yasaburō; 1539 Okō Castle, Tosa Province
- Died: July 11, 1599 (aged 59–60) Fushimi
- Relations: Chōsokabe Kunichika (father); Kōsokabe Chikayasu (brother); Chosokabe Nobuchika (son)
- Nickname(s): "Little Princess" (Himewako) "Little Demon" (Oniwako)

Military service
- Allegiance: Chōsokabe clan Ichijō family Toyotomi clan
- Rank: Daimyo, Kunai-shō
- Unit: Chōsokabe clan
- Commands: Okō Castle
- Battles/wars: Tosa Campaign (1562-1575); Battle of Shimantogawa (1575); Iyo Campaign (1579); Battle of Nakatomigawa (1582); Battle of Hiketa (1583); Invasion of Shikoku (1585); Kyushu Campaign (1586-1587); Siege of Shimoda (1590); Korean Campaign (1592); San Felipe incident (1596)

Chōsokabe Motochika (長宗我部 元親; 1539 – July 11, 1599) was a daimyō in Japanese Sengoku-period. He was the 21st chief of the Chōsokabe clan of Tosa Province (present-day Kōchi Prefecture), the ruler of Shikoku region.

== Early life and rise ==
He was the son and heir of Chōsokabe Kunichika and his mother was a daughter of the Saitō clan of Mino Province. His childhood name was Yasaburō (弥三郎). He is said to have been born in Okō Castle in the Nagaoka district of Tosa. Motochika was a tall, fair-skinned, but quiet. His father, Kunichika, was said to have fretted about the boy's gentle nature (he seems to have been nicknamed Himewako, or 'Little Princess'); Kunichika's worries evaporated when Motochika later proved himself a skilled and brave warrior. When Motochika came of age, his father had already begun to draw away from the Ichijō family, and Motochika would carry on his work.

In 1560, at the Battle of Tonomoto, Chōsokabe Kunichika captured Nagahama castle from the Motoyama clan. In response to this, Motoyama Shigetoki departed Asakura castle with 2,500 men to take the castle back. Kunichika intercepted him with 1,000 troops near Nagahama castle. This battle is noted for being Chōsokabe Motochika's first battle, in which he fought bravely, greatly impressing his father and his retainers.

In 1562, Chōsokabe Motochika attacked Asakura castle defeated Motoyama Shigetoki and by forming alliances with local families, Motochika was able to build his power base on the Kōchi plain.

In 1569, while being careful to remain ostensibly loyal to the Ichijō family over the next few years, Motochika's power grew to the extent that he was strong enough to march on the rival Aki clan of east Tosa with 7,000 men, He defeated Aki Kunitora at Battle of Yanagare, then went on to take Aki Castle.

In the course of the decade he was awarded the court rank Ministry of Imperial Household (Kunai shō) and was sufficiently confident after the reduction of Aki to finally turn on the Ichijō family.

== Unification of Shikoku ==
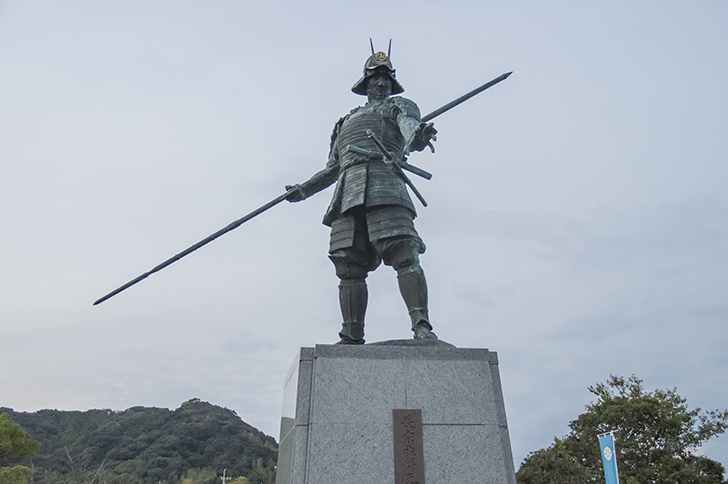
Chōsokabe Motochika Statue

In 1573, while still lord of the Hata district of Tosa, Ichijō Kanesada was unpopular and had already suffered the defection of a number of important retainers. Seizing the opportunity, Motochika with his brother Kōsokabe Chikayasu, wasted no time in marching to attack on the Ichijō's headquarters at Nakamura, and Kanesada fled to Bungo, defeated.

In 1575, at the Battle of Shimantogawa (Battle of Watarigawa), he defeated the Ichijo family.

Following his conquest of Tosa, Motochika turned north and prepared for an invasion of Iyo province. The lord of that province was Kōno Michinao, a daimyo who had once been driven from his domain by the Utsunomiya clan, returning only with the assistance of the powerful Mōri clan. However, it was unlikely that Kōno could count on that sort of help again as the Mōri were embroiled in a war with Oda Nobunaga. Nonetheless, Chōsokabe's campaign in Iyo did not go off without a hitch.

In 1579, a 7,000 men Chōsokabe army, commanded by Kumu Yorinobu, met the forces of Kōno Michinao, led by Doi Kiyonaga at the Battle of Mimaomote. In the ensuing battle, Kumu Yorinobu was killed and his army defeated, though the loss proved little more than an unfortunate delay. The next year, Motochika led some 30,000 men into Iyo Province, and forced Kōno Michinao to flee to Bungo province.

In 1580, Oda Nobunaga disapproved of Motochika's conquest of Shikoku, despite being allied with them. This commotion started from Motochika's effort to respond the Miyoshi clan's threat, by strengthened ties not only with Nobunaga but also with Mōri Terumoto to isolate the Miyoshi clan diolomatically. However, Motochika did not change his policy even after Nobunaga began a full-scale invasion of Chugoku Region against the Mōri clan, which caused Nobunaga to distrust grow suspicious about Motochika's allegiance. However, historian Yoshihiro Kawashima stated the relationship between the Mōri and Chosokabe clans had already broken down by the time the Mōri and Miyoshi clans made peace in 1575, and that the alliance between the Chosokabe and the Sanuki Kagawa clan (the adoption of Kagawa Chikazu) itself was the result of the shared interests of the two clans, who were pro-Oda and under threat from both the Mōri and Miyoshi clans. Regardless the reason, Nobunaga only allowed Motochika to possess Tosa Province and the southern half of Awa Province and submit to him unconditionally after the provocation from Miyoshi Yasunaga who just recently submitted to Nobunaga.

With little interference from either the Mōri or the Ōtomo, Chōsokabe was free to press onwards, and in 1582, he stepped up ongoing raids into Awa province and defeated Sogō Masayasu and the Miyoshi clan at the Battle of Nakatomigawa. Later, Motochika advanced to Sanuki province and defeated Sengoku Hidehisa at Battle of Hiketa.

By 1583, Chōsokabe Motochika had controlled Tosa Province, Iyo and subdued both Awa and Sanuki. Over the ensuing decade, he extended his power to all of Shikoku island, making Motochika's dream of ruling all of Shikoku a reality.

After unifying Tosa, he formed an alliance with Oda Nobunaga, who was promoting the unification project in the central government, through kinship with his wife.

== Conflict with Hideyoshi ==
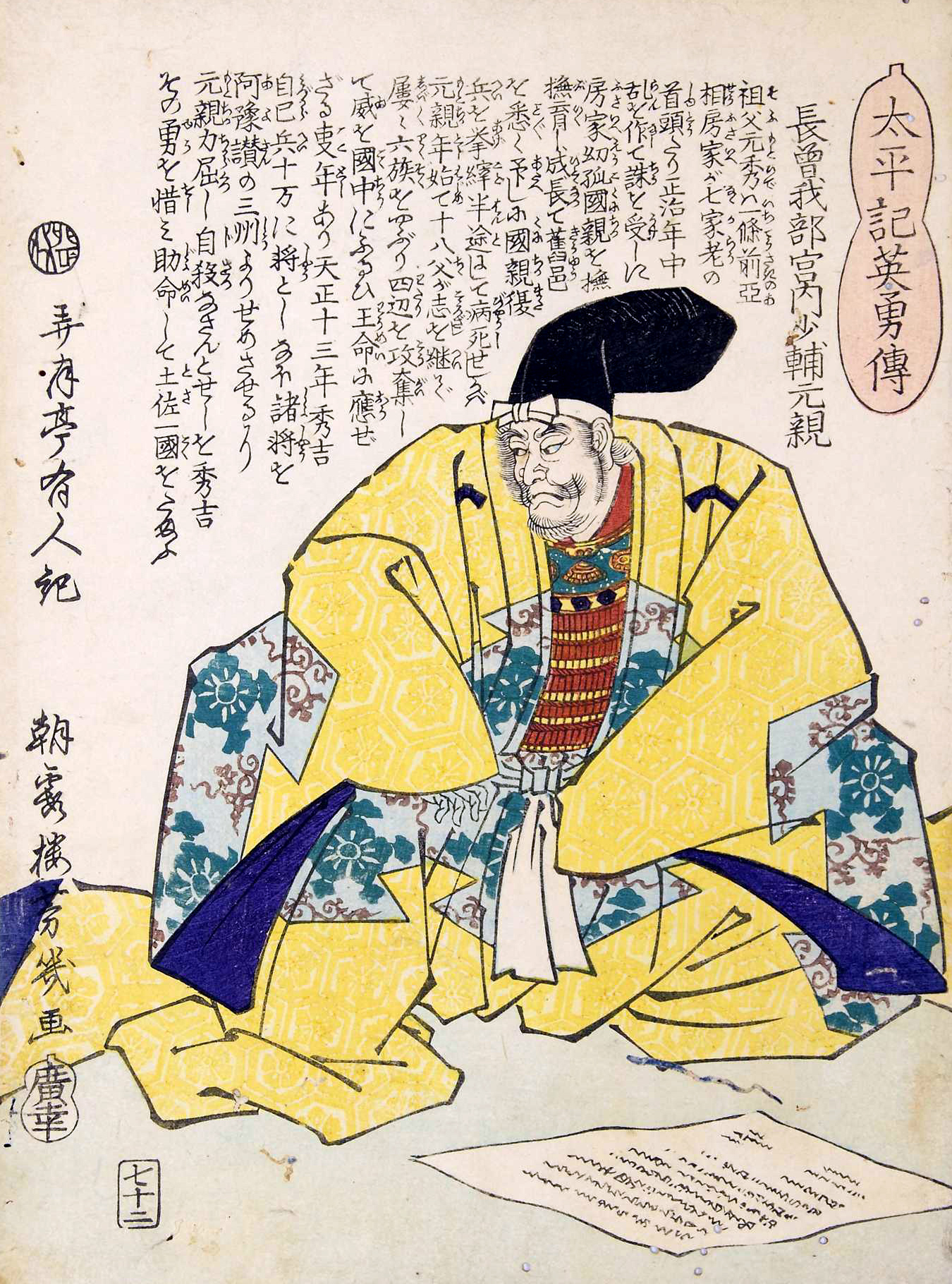
Chōsokabe Motochika picture

In 1584, Toyotomi Hideyoshi won a political victory against Tokugawa Ieyasu, securing his position as paramount warlord. Hideyoshi began expanding his rule from outside his base in central Honshu and decided to invade Shikoku.

In 1585, Toyotomi Hideyoshi launched an attack against Chōsokabe Motochika, and seized Shikoku island, the smallest of Japan's four main islands.

=== Shikoku Campaign ===
In 1585, Toyotomi forces invaded Shikoku island with a force of 113,000 men, led by Ukita Hideie, Kobayakawa Takakage, Kikkawa Motoharu, Hashiba Hidenaga, and Hashiba Hidetsugu against 40,000 soldiers of the Chōsokabe clan. Despite the overwhelming size of Hideyoshi's army, Chōsokabe chose to fight to defend his territories. The campaign battles culminated in the siege of Ichinomiya Castle, which lasted for 26 days. Motochika surrendered, and forfeited Awa, Sanuki, and Iyo Provinces; Hideyoshi permitted him to retain Tosa.

== Service under Hideyoshi ==
Under Hideyoshi, in 1587 Motochika, Kōsokabe Chikayasu and his son Nobuchika participated in the invasion of neighboring Kyūshū in which Nobuchika died at Battle of Hetsugigawa. In 1590, Motochika led a fleet in the Siege of Shimoda and Siege of Odawara, and also fought in the Japanese invasions of Korea in 1592.

In 1596, the Spanish ship San Felipe was wrecked in Chōsokabe territory while en route from Manila to Acapulco. Motochika seized the cargo of the ship, and the incident escalated all the way up to Hideyoshi, leading to the crucifixion of 26 Christians in Nagasaki, the first lethal persecution of Christians by the state in Japan.

== Death ==
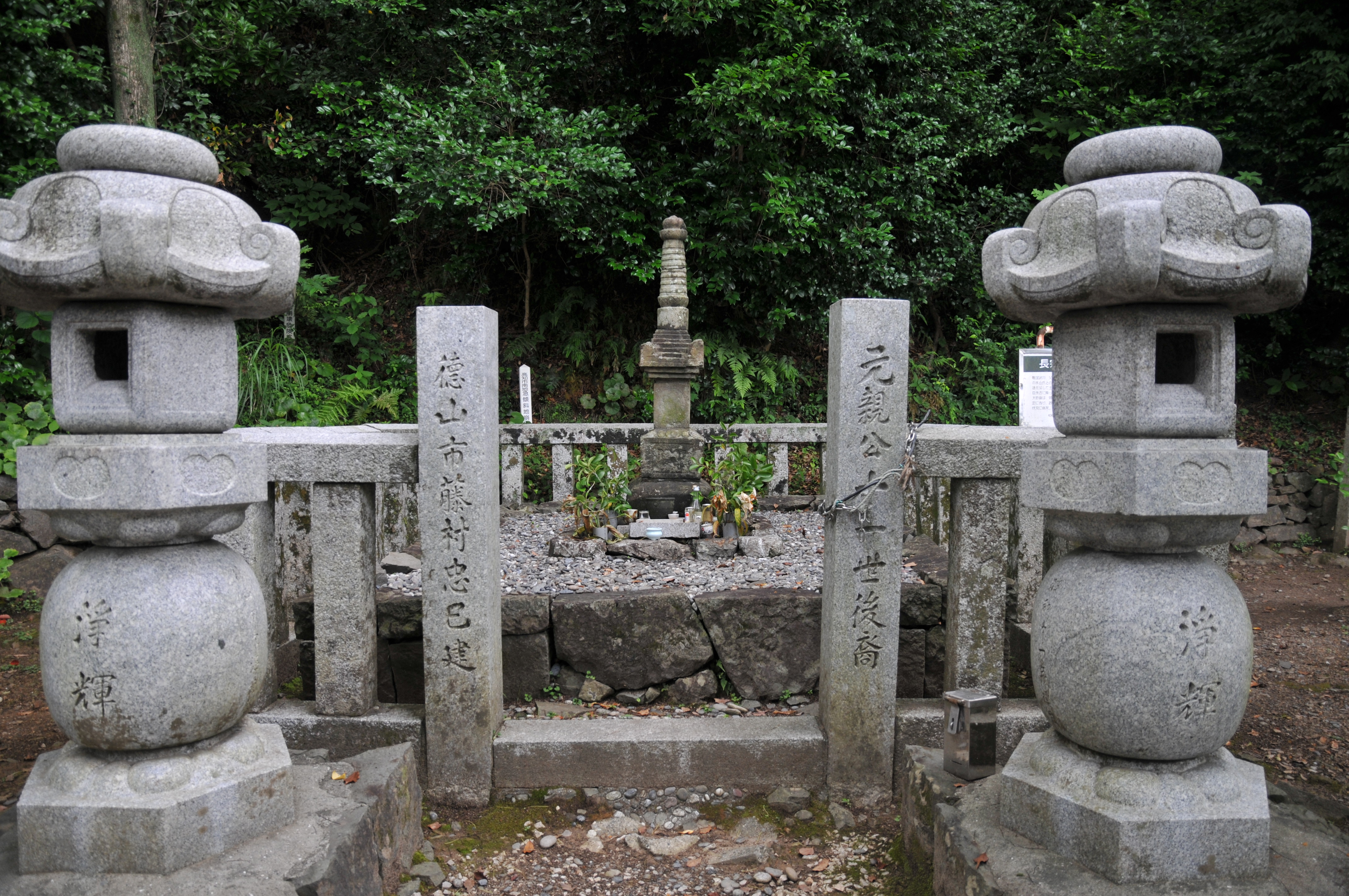
Chōsokabe Motochika grave

Motochika died in 1599 at age 60 at his mansion in Fushimi. His successor was Chōsokabe Morichika.

== Legacy ==
In addition to his leadership, Motochika is remembered for his '100-Article Code of the Chōsokabe' and his struggle to found an economically strong castle town, moving in the course of his career from Oko to Otazaka and on to Urado.

== Family ==
- Father: Chōsokabe Kunichika (1504–1560)
- Mother: Daughter of the Saitō clan
- Younger Brother
  - Kira Chikasada (1541–1576), Kunichika's second son. Shared his first battle with his eldest brother, Motochika, at Nagahama. Adopted into Kira clan on brother's orders and became a family retainer. Helped his brother's fight against the Ichijo clan until he died of illness in 1576.
  - Kōsokabe Chikayasu (1543–1593), Kunichika's third son. He was adopted by Kōsokabe Chikahide from Kōsokabe clan. He fought in all Motochika's campaign and Toyotomi Kyushu Campaign.
  - Shima Chikamasu (d. 1571), Kunichika's fourth son. Became a part of the Shima clan to appease demands for an heir. Known as a brave warrior who fought in Motochika's campaign to quell the Motoyama clan.
- Wife: Lady Motochika (died 1583)
  - Concubine: Koshōshō, or Lady Ōgata
- Sons:
  - Chōsokabe Nobuchika (1565–1587) by Lady Motochika
  - Kagawa Chikakazu (1567–1587) by Lady Motochika
  - Tsuno Chikatada (1572–1600) by Lady Motochika
  - Chōsokabe Morichika (1575–1615) by Lady Motochika
  - Chōsokabe Ukondaifu (1583-1615) by Lady Ogata
  - Chōsokabe Yasutoyo (born 1599)
- Daughters:
  - Unknown daughter (wife of Ichijō Tadamasa) by Lady Motochika
  - Akohime (wife of Satake Chikanao) by Lady Motochika
  - Unknown daughter (wife of Kira Chikazane) by Lady Motochika
  - Unknown daughter (wife of Yoshimatsu Jūzaemon) by Lady Motochika

== In popular culture ==
In the 1949 Mexican film Philip of Jesus, the character Prince Chokozabe (sic) is played by Rodolfo Acosta.

Motochika is a playable character from Samurai Warriors 2 Xtreme Legends onwards, where he wields a shamisen, he continuously calls himself as "The Bat King", due to Nobunaga historically referring to him as a "the bat who refuses to fly away from its home". This version of the character is also a playable character in Pokémon Conquest, with his partner Pokémon being Dewott and Samurott.

He is also a playable character in several Koei strategy games, as a selectable warlord in Nobunaga's Ambition series, and as a unlockable character in Taikou Risshiden IV and V.

Motochika is also a playable character in the Sony PlayStation game, Sengoku Basara where he wields an anchor and appears as a pirate. He also appears in the anime adaptation of the game Sengoku Basara: Samurai Kings.

He is a playable warlord in Total War:Shogun 2.
