= Kira Chikazane =

Samurai

Kira Chikazane (吉良 親実, 1563 - 1588) was a senior retainer under the Chōsokabe clan, during the late Sengoku period of Feudal Japan.
