= Okō Castle =

- 岡豊城
- Nankoku, Kōchi Prefecture, Japan
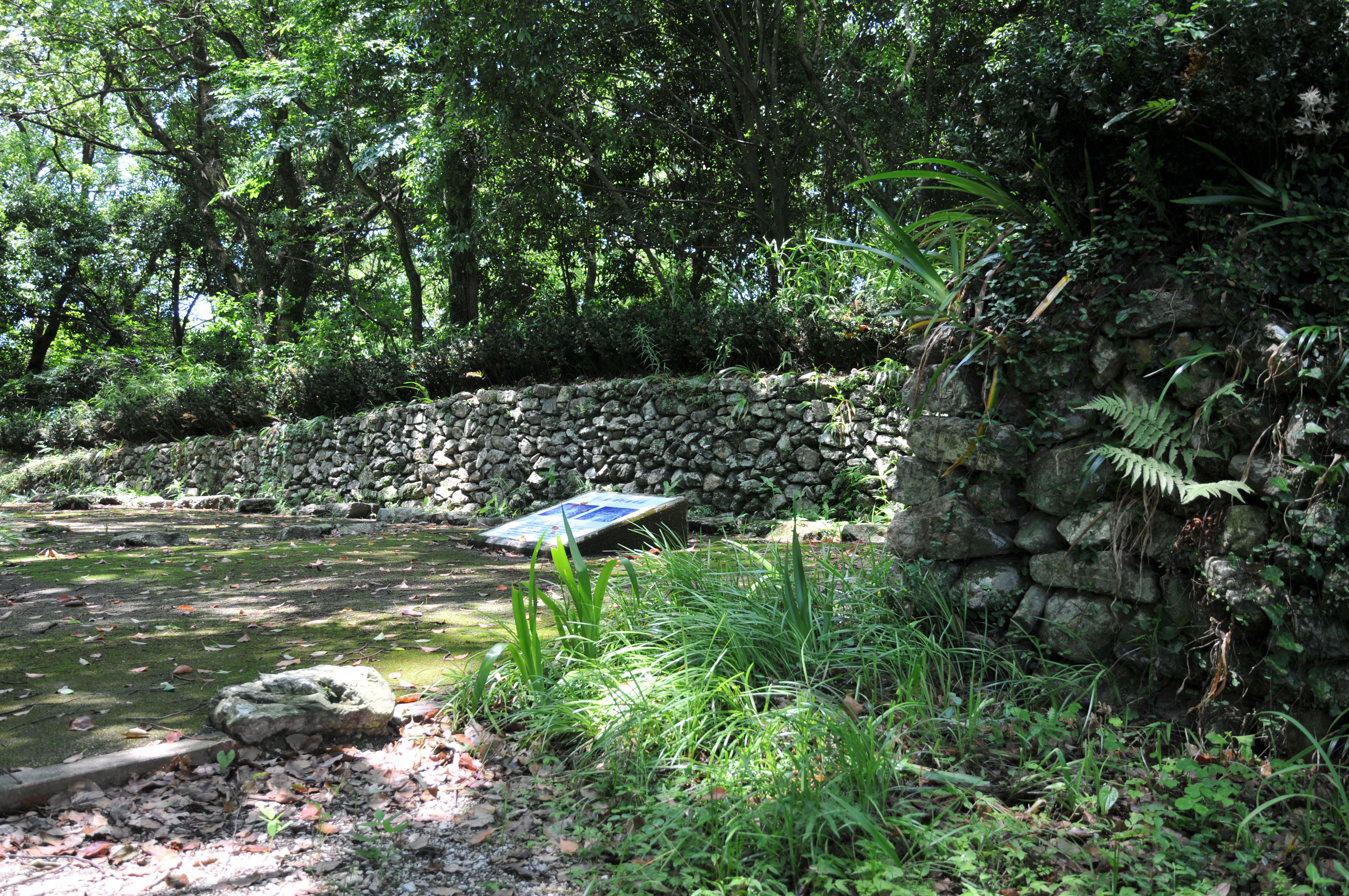
- Stone wall of Sannodan compound

Site information
- Type: Hirayama-style castle
- Owner: Chōsokabe clan
- Condition: ruins

Location
- Okō Castle Okō Castle (Japan)
- Coordinates: 33°35′41.86″N 133°37′20.97″E

Site history
- Built: 13c-14c
- Built by: Unknown
- Demolished: 1591

Garrison information
- Past commanders: Chōsokabe Kunichika, Chōsokabe Motochika
- National Historic Site of Japan

Okō Castle (岡豊城, Okō-jō) was a Japanese castle structure located in what is now part of the city of Nankoku Kōchi Prefecture, Japan. It was the original base of power for the Chōsokabe clan who were feudal lords of Tosa Province during the late Muromachi and Sengoku periods and famous as the birthplace of the warlord Chōsokabe Motochika. Its ruins have been protected as a National Historic Site since 2008.

== Location ==
Okō Castle was located on a 97-meter mountain at the northern edge of the Kochi plain, next to the Kokubu River. It is located near the historic center of Tosa Province, as the Tosa Kokubun-ji and ruins of the Tosa provincial capital are in the vicinity. The main road from this area to Awa Province passes this castle, making it a strategic location for controlling the movement of people and goods in southern Shikoku.

== History ==
The exact date of the castle's foundation is unknown but built in the Kamakura period. Likewise, the origins of the Chōsokabe clan are uncertain. The clan claimed descent from the Hata clan and entered Tosa Province sometime in the 12th century as local administrators under the Kamakura shogunate, but were a minor clan. In the early Muromachi period, the Hosokawa clan became shugo of Tosa Province (along with Awa and Sanuki Provinces) and the Chōsokabe served as their retainers. However the Hosokawa were greatly weakened by the Ōnin War (1467-1477) and Tosa came to be governed by a coalition of seven local warlords, led by the Ichijō clan, a branch of the Kyoto nobility who had estates in western Tosa. The Chōsokabe attempted to capitalize on his unrest, but this resulted in an attack on Okō Castle by the neighboring Motoyama clan in 1508, and Chōsokabe Kanetsugu was forced to commit suicide.

His son Chōsokabe Kunichika narrowly escaped from Okō Castle and several years later returned by Ichijō Fusaie's help and recovered the clan's territories in the eastern part of the Kochi Plain. Kunichika sought revenge against the Motoyama clan, who controlled the western half of the Kochi Plain, and more importantly, the port facilities at Urato Bay. Kunichika began by seizing Nagahama Castle, a branch castle of the Asakura clan who were allied with the Motoyama in 1560. This marked the battle debut of his son Chōsokabe Motochika. On hearing of the fall of Nagahama Castle, the Motoyama responded by sending 1000 troops in a counterattack. Although the Chōsokabe had only 300 men, the fierce resistance led by Chōsokabe Motochika foiled the Motoyama attempt to retake the castle. Chōsokabe Kunichika died shortly after the battle. Motochika defeated an attempt by the Aki clan to take Okō Castle in 1563 and by 1570 had secured control over all of the Kochi Plain. By 1575 he had expelled the Ichijō clan and had united Tosa Province under his rule. Chōsokabe Motochika then invaded Awa and Iyo provinces, which he conquered by around 1580. Motochika was allied with Oda Nobunaga, but after the latter's assassination in 1582, he accelerated his campaign and had taken almost all of Shikoku by 1583. However, Toyotomi Hideyoshi viewed the Chōsokabe as an increasing threat and launched an invasion of Shikoku, decisively defeating the Chōsokabe at several locations, and limiting their rule to Tosa Province. Motochika moved the clan seat from Okō Castle to Urato Castle in 1591, and the castle was abandoned by 1598

== Current ==
The castle is now only ruins, with low some stone walls, moats, and earthworks. The Kōchi Prefectural Museum of History was built in what was once the Third Enclosure. At the museum excavated artefacts from the castle are exhibited.

The castle was listed as one of the Continued Top 100 Japanese Castles in 2017.

== Gallery ==
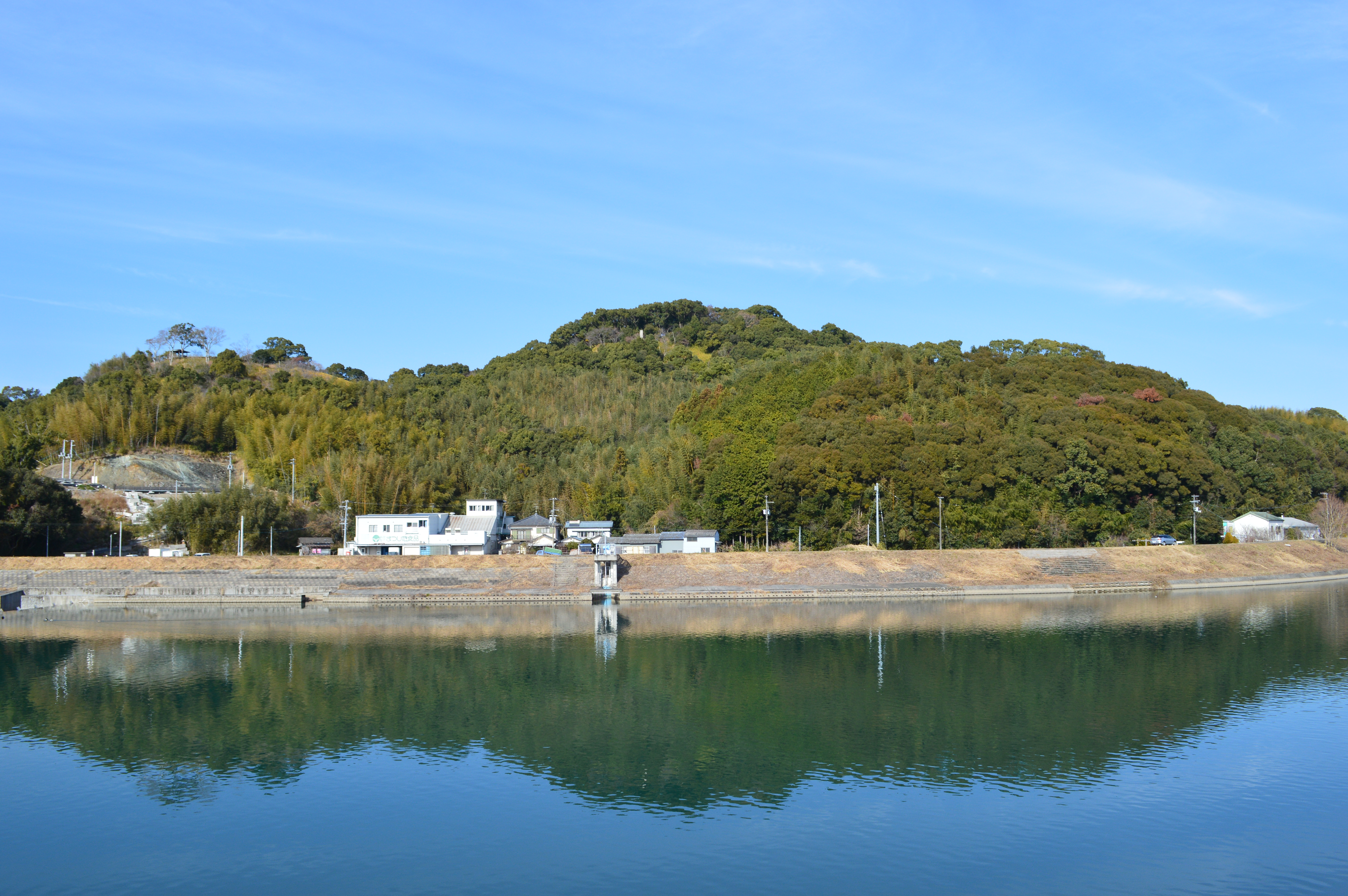
Mountain Okō/Okō Castle

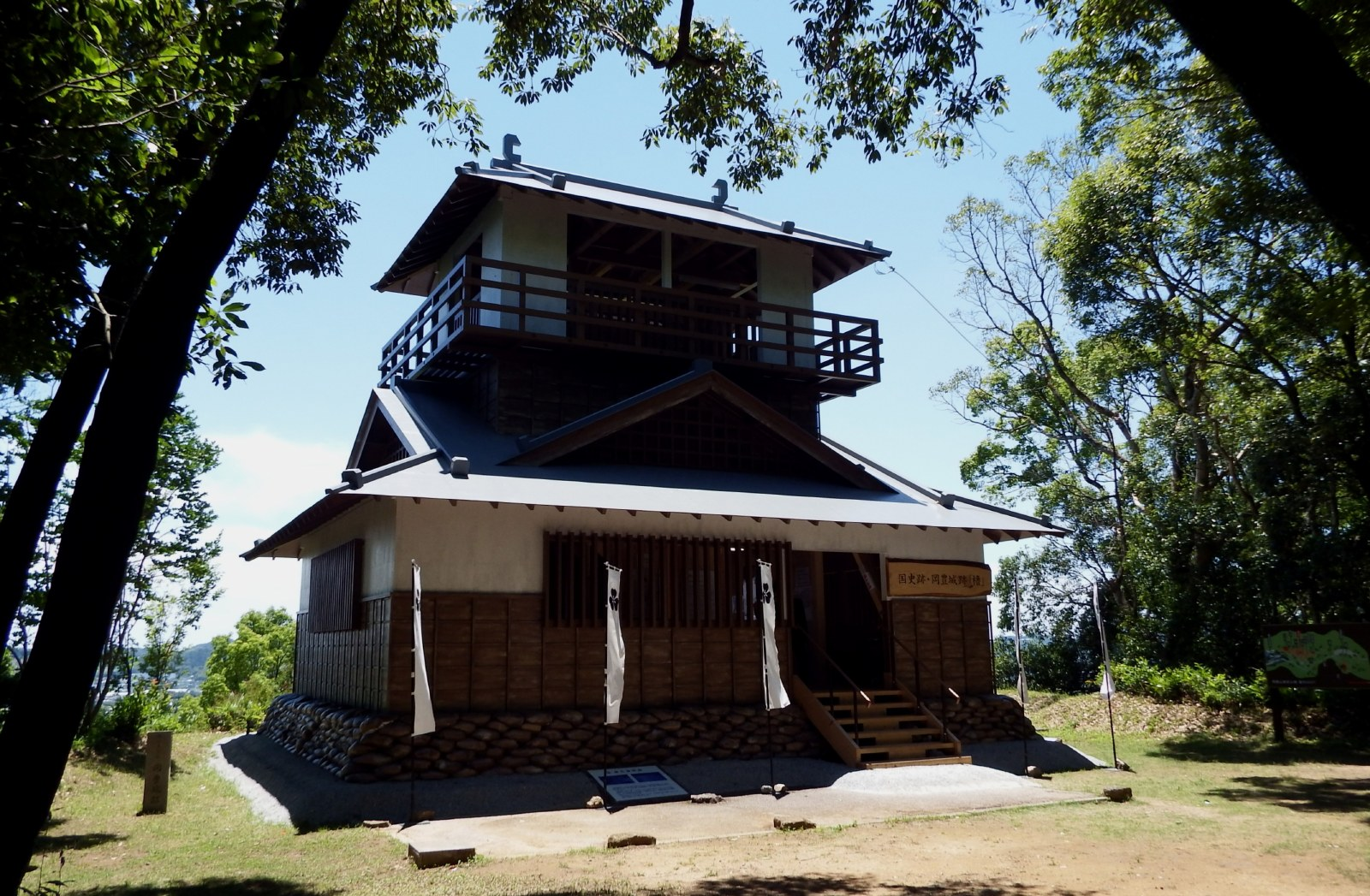
Yagura of Tsumenodan

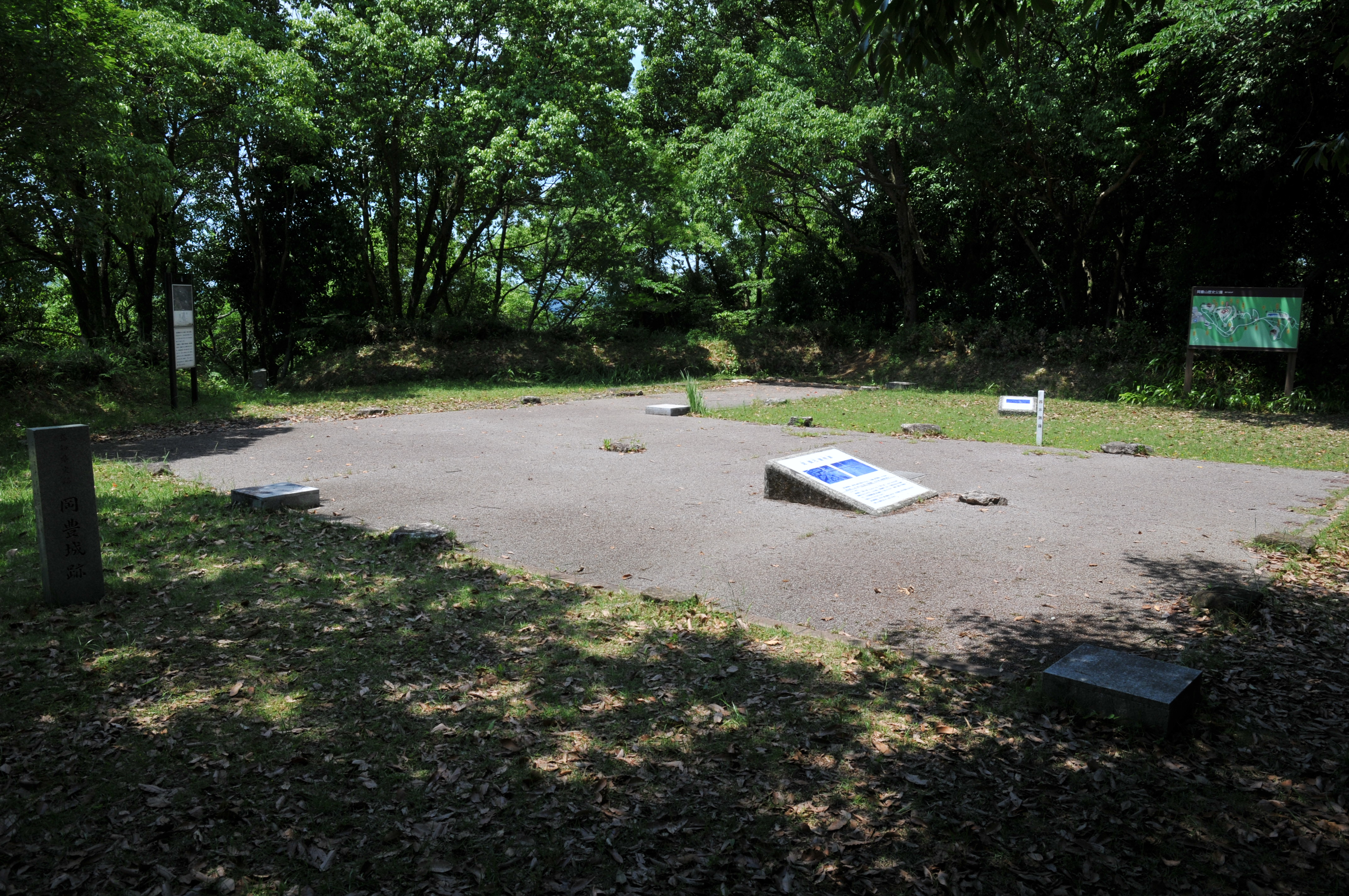
Tsumenodan compound (Honmaru compound)

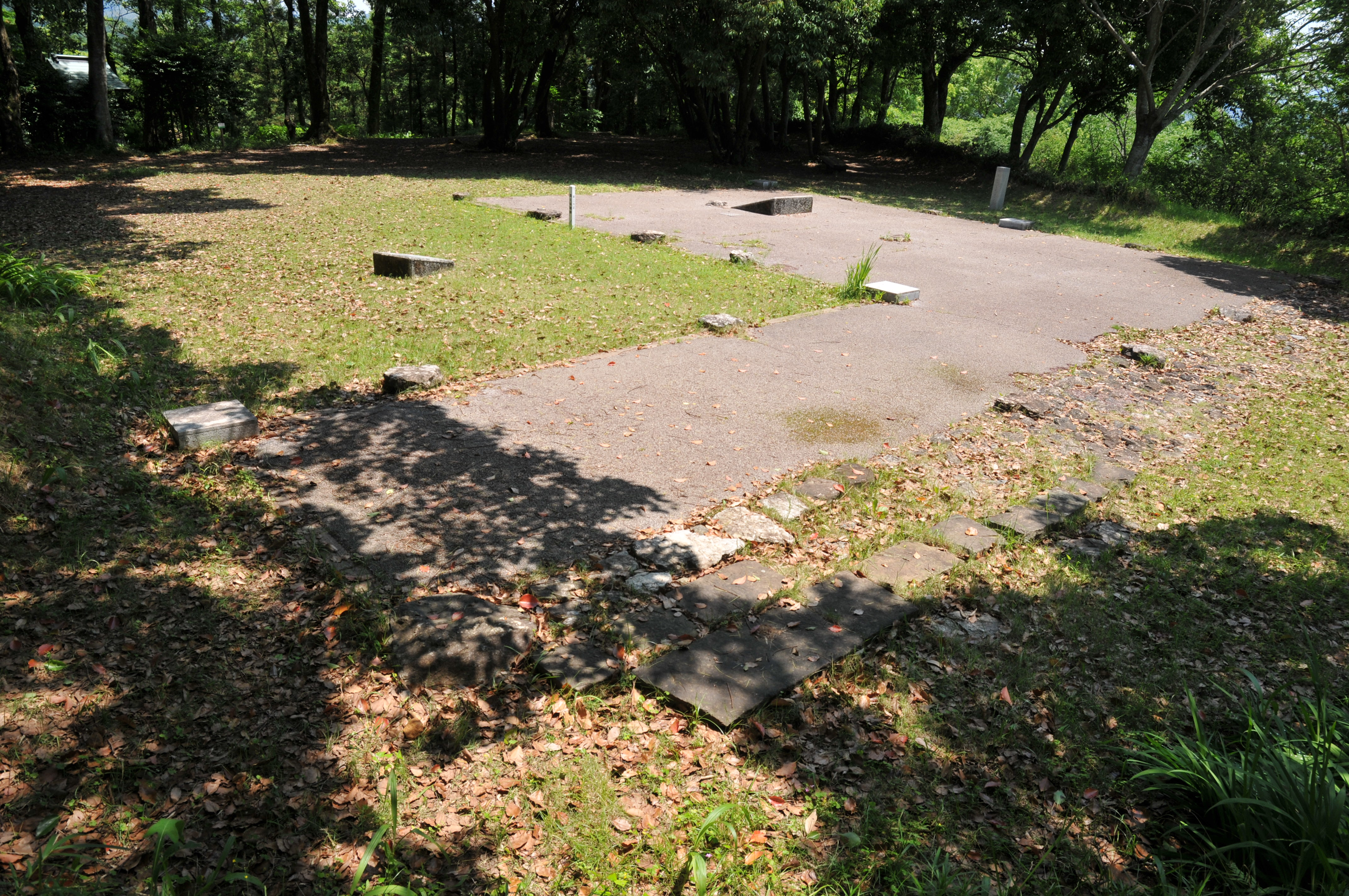
Tsumenodan compound

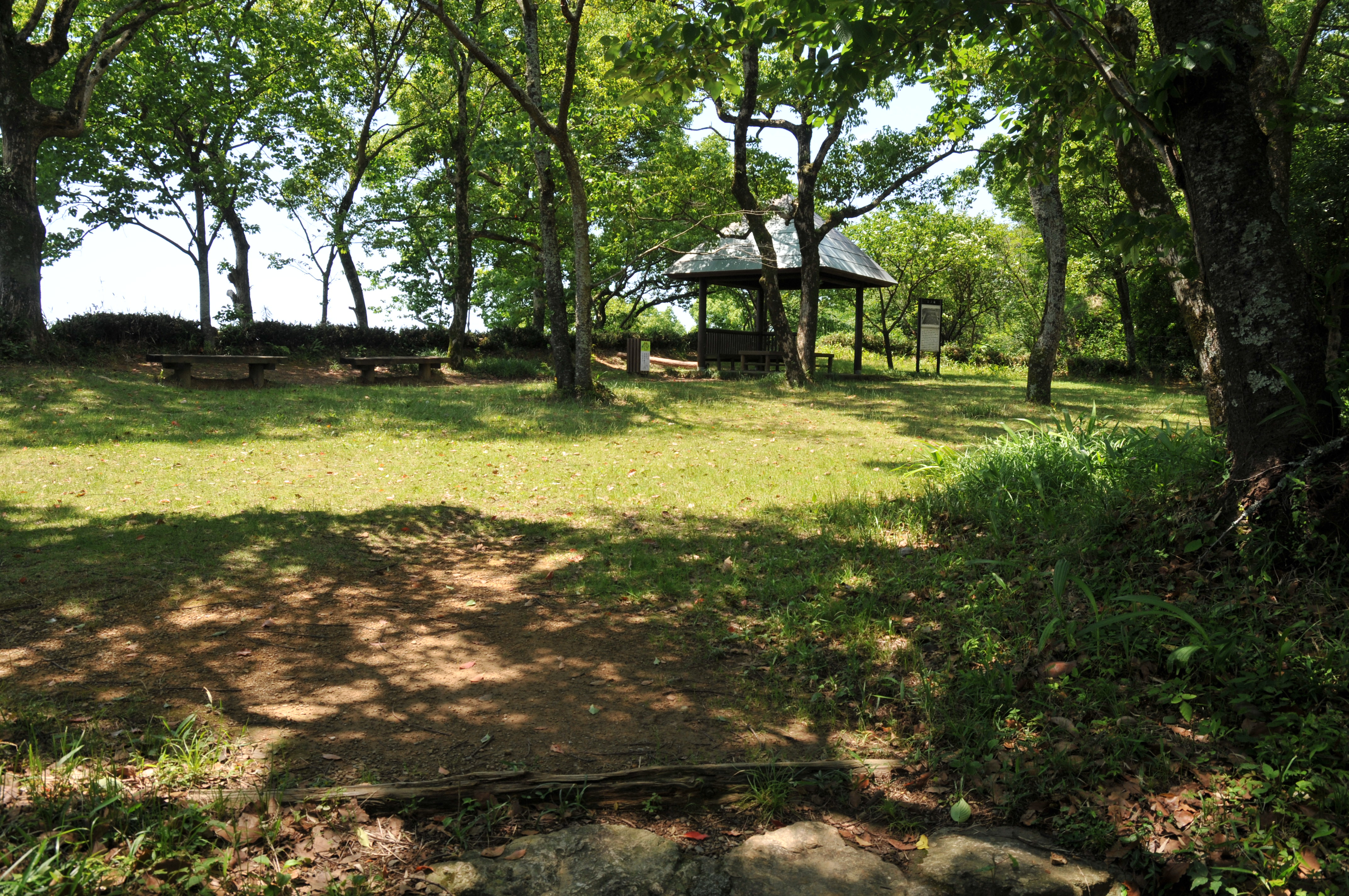
Ninodan compound

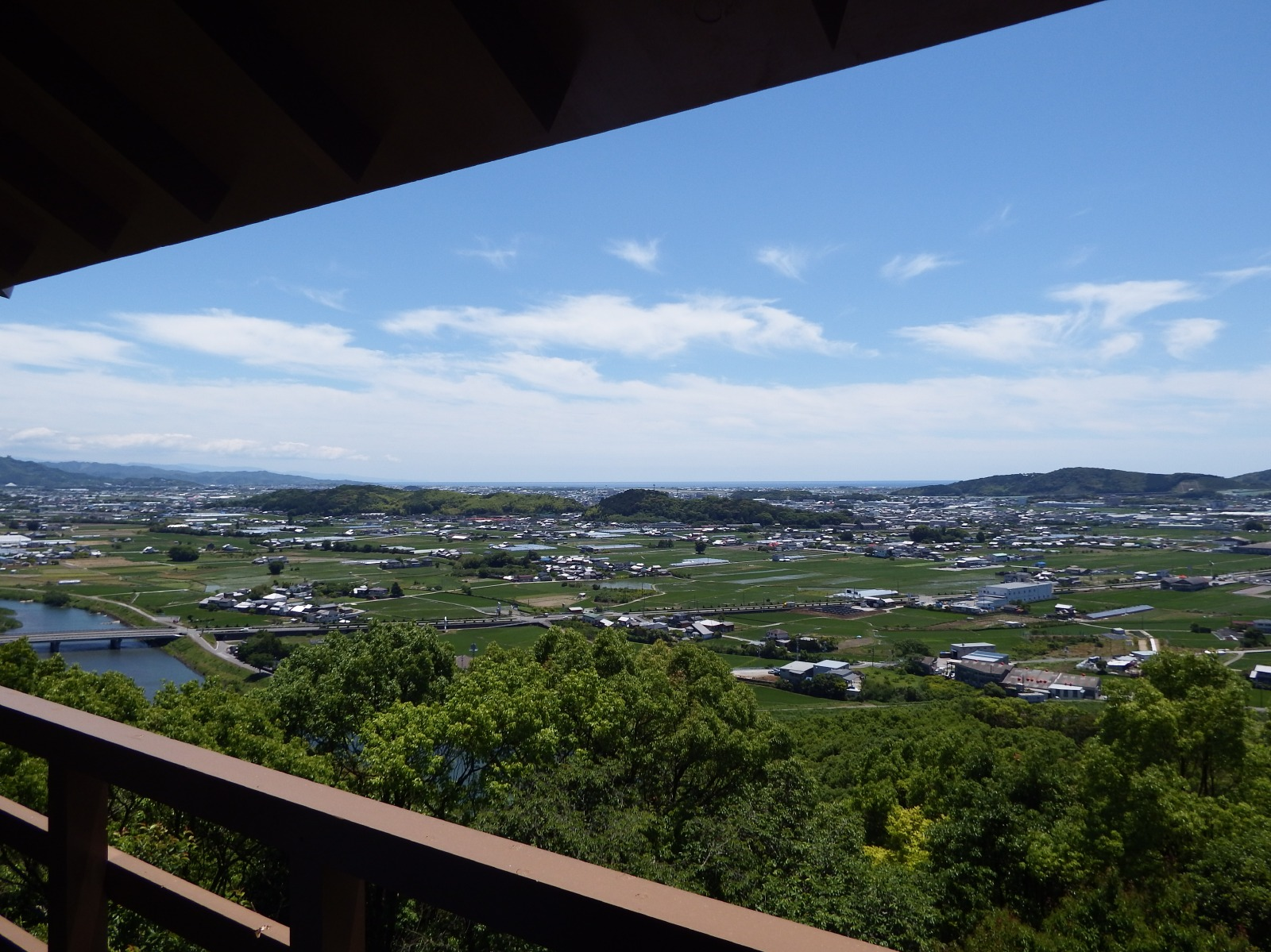
View from the Tsumenodan compound

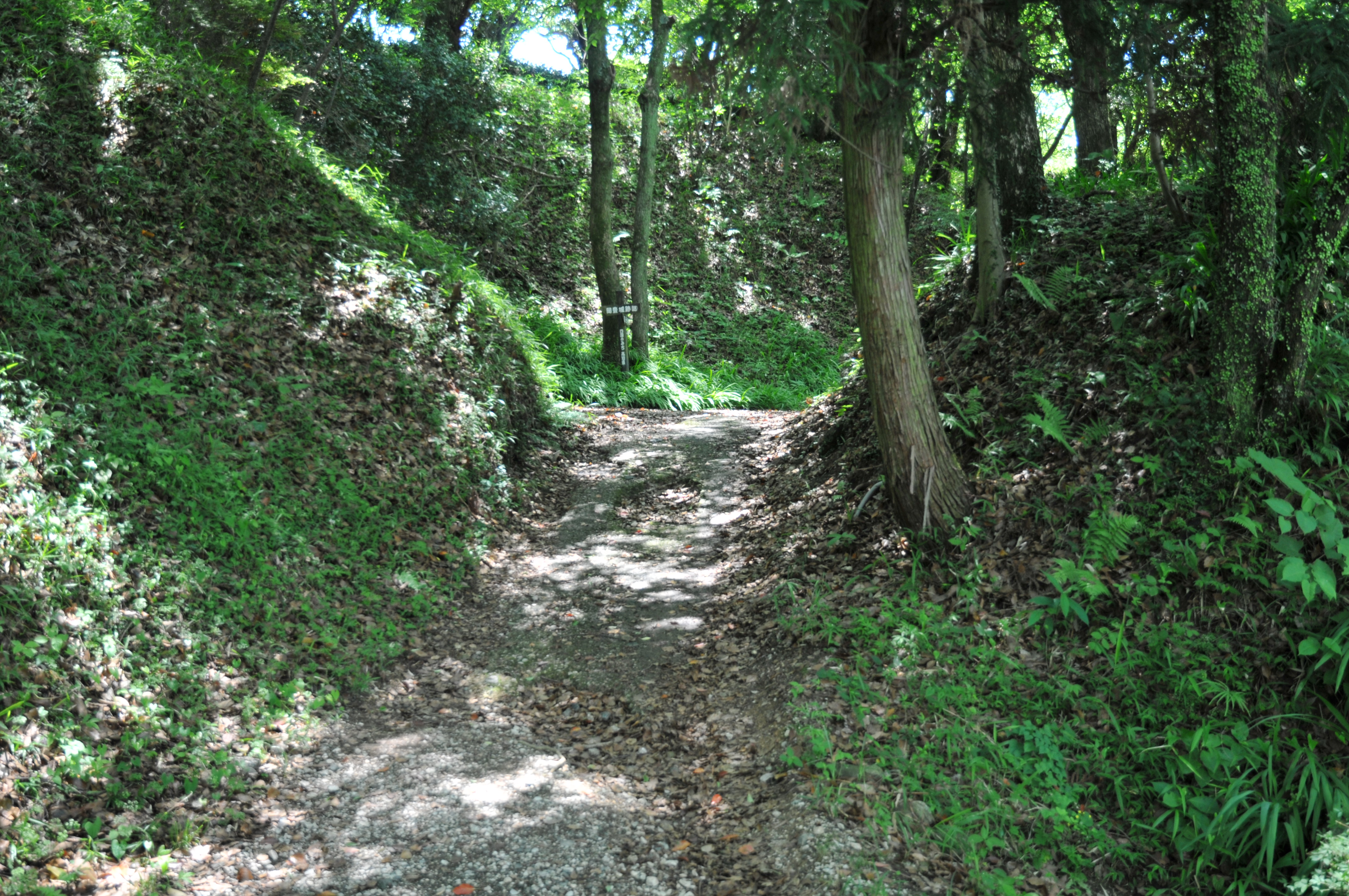
Gate under the Tsumenodan compound

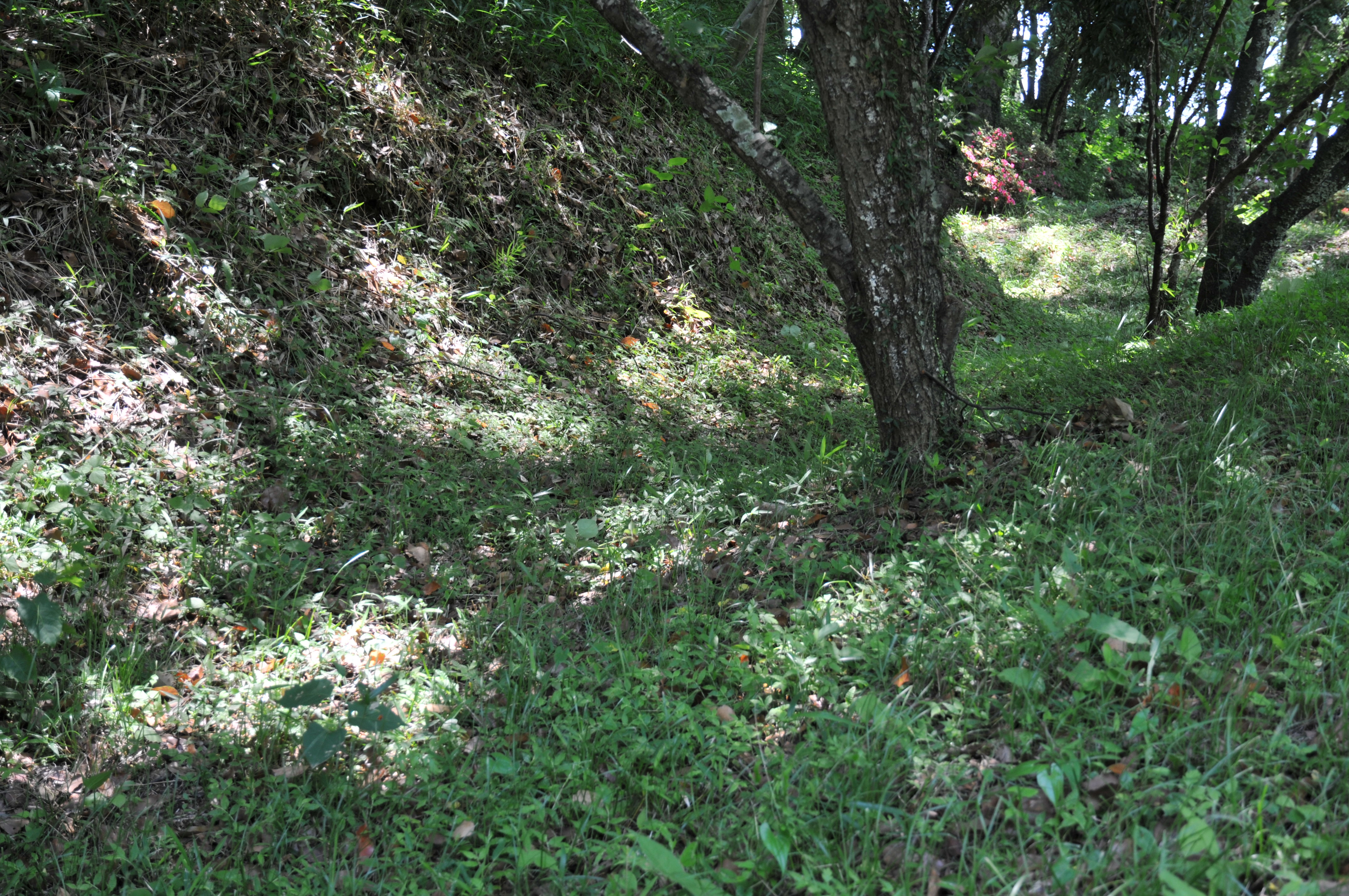
Dry moat

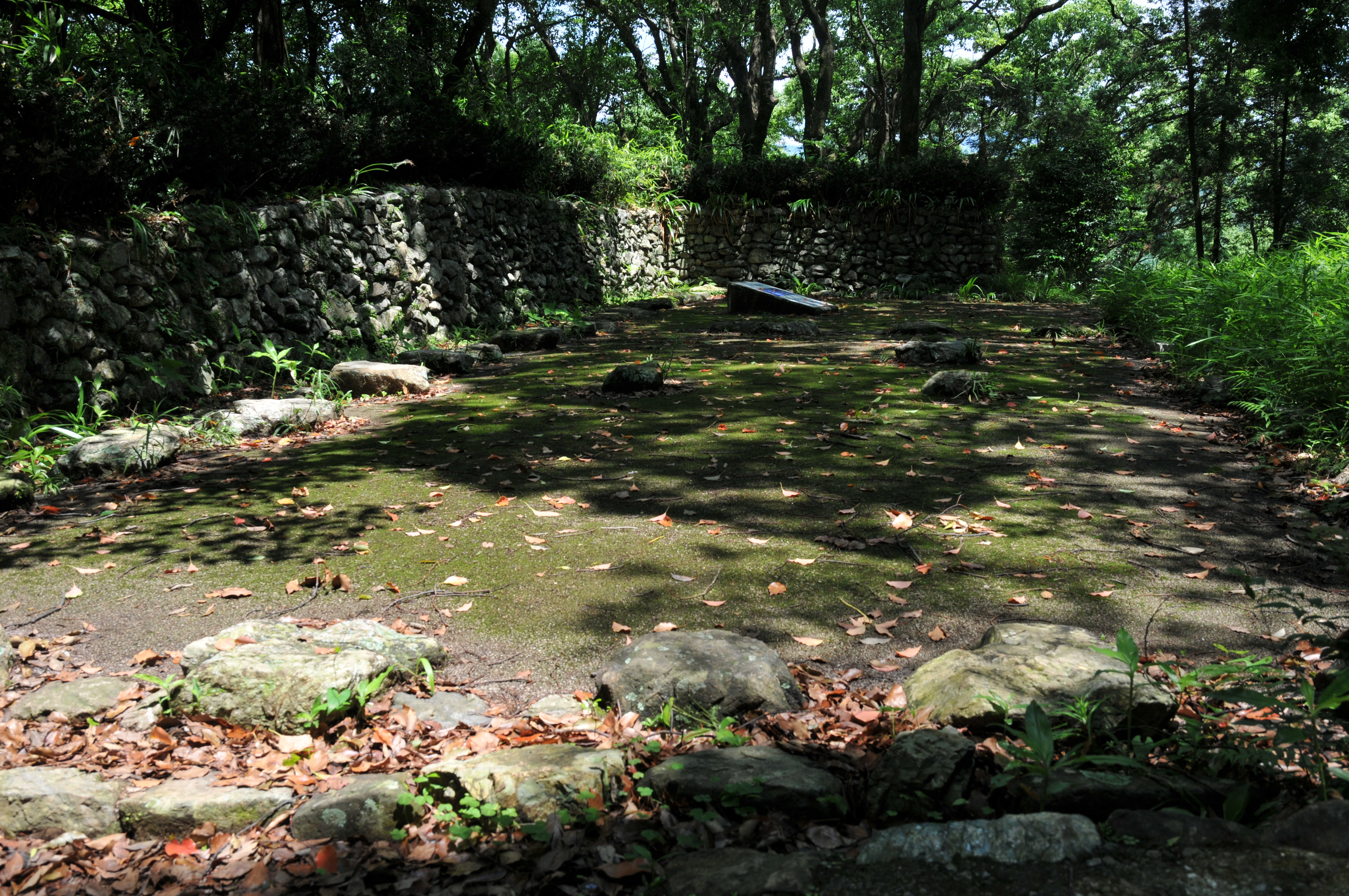
Stone wall of Sannodan

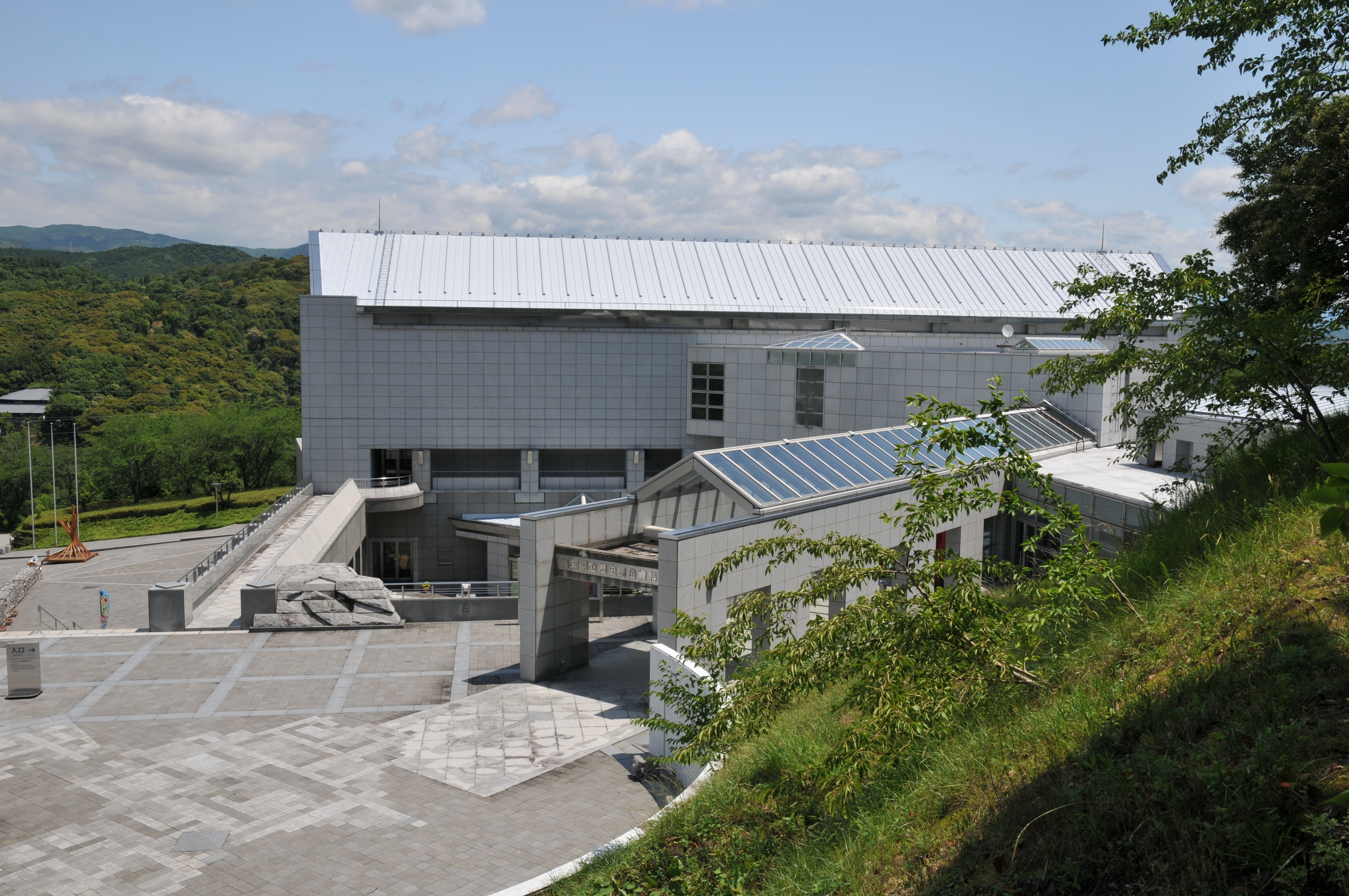
Kōchi Prefectural Museum of History

== See also ==
- List of historic sites of Japan (Kōchi)
- Kōchi Prefectural Museum of History
