= Battle of Mimaomote =

Date	21 May 1579
Location	Iyo Province
Result	Kōno clan victory

Belligerents
Kōno Michinao forces	forces of Chōsokabe Motochika

Commanders and leaders
Doi Kiyonaga	Kumu Yorinobu †

Strength
	7,000

The Battle of Mimaomote (三間表の戦い, Mimaomote no tatakai) was a battle during the Azuchi–Momoyama period (16th century) of Japan. The Battle of Mimaomote was initiated by Chōsokabe commander Kumu Yorinobu with 7,000 men as he advanced into Iyo Province on Shikoku Island.

There Kumu Yorinobu attacked Kōno forces under Doi Kiyonaga, who had crossed the Mimaomote River to engage him. Yorinobu was defeated and killed.
