= Chōsokabe clan =

Japanese samurai clan

Chōsokabe 長宗我部
- The emblem (mon) of the Chōsokabe clan
- Home province: Tosa
- Parent house: Unknown; Hata clan (self-proclaimed/disputed)
- Final ruler: Chōsokabe Morichika
- Ruled until: 1615, Battle of Osaka

Chōsokabe clan (Japanese: 長宗我部氏, Hepburn: Chōsokabe-shi), also known as Chōsokame (長宗我部), was a Japanese samurai kin group. Over time, they were known for serving the Hosokawa clan, then the Miyoshi clan and then the Ichijō clan.

== Origin ==
The clan claims descent from the ancient immigrant (Toraijin) clan called the Hata clan. The Hata clan, while originating from Korea; specifically from Paekche according to the Nihon Shoki (720), its lineage differs depending on the source. According to the Shinsen Shōjiroku (815), the Hata clan claims descent from Qin Shi Huang of the Qin dynasty. However, modern Japanese historians state that the clan most likely originated from the kingdom of Silla, another ancient kingdom of Korea. Hence making the Chōsokabe clan, a branch of the aforementioned Hata clan, also of Korean (Silla) descent.

However, in recent times, the self-proclamation of their Hata clan heritage is heavily scrutinized, with the general consensus within the Japanese academic circles labelling the clan's realistic origin as "Unknown".

== History ==
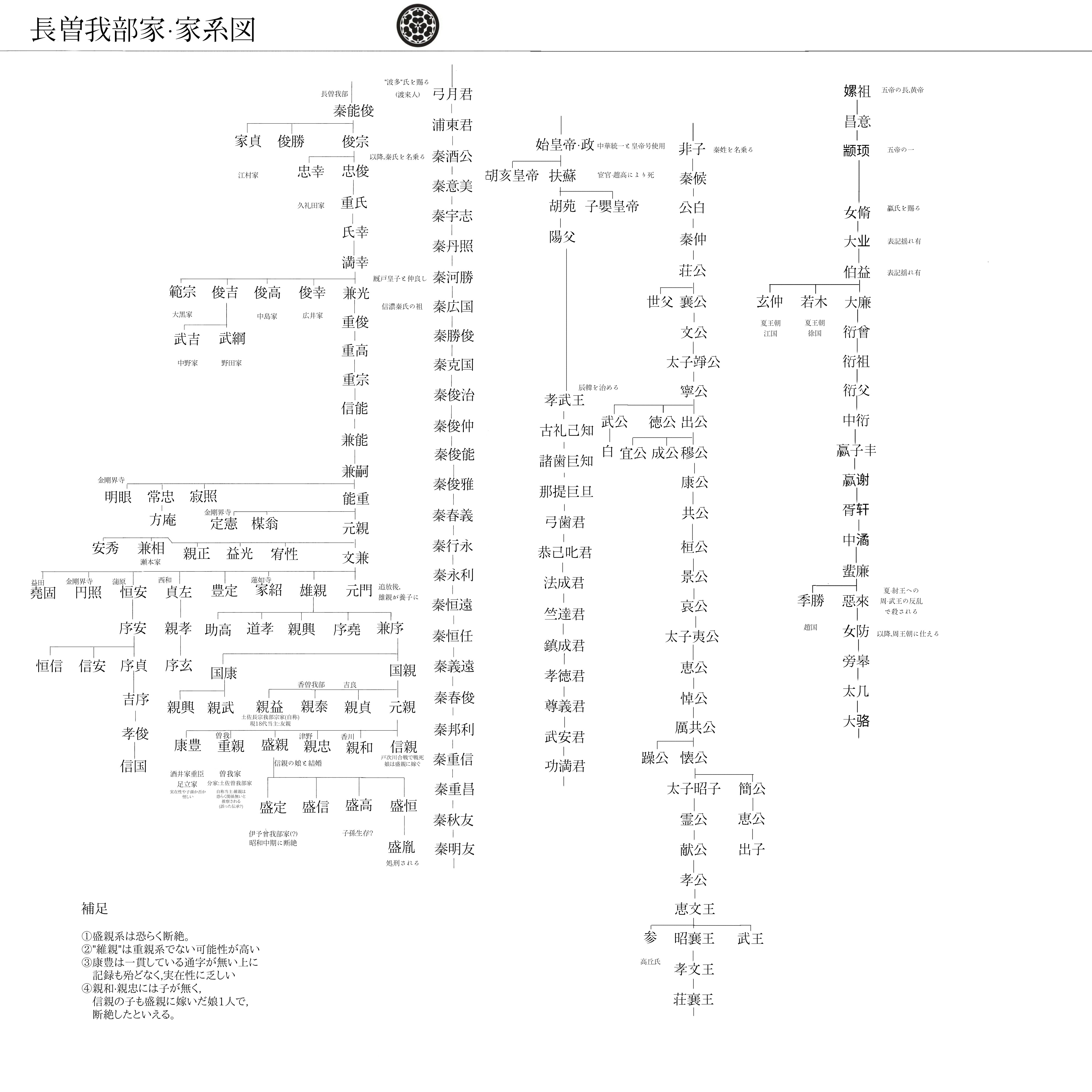
A family tree of Chōsokabe clan

The clan is associated with Tosa Province in modern-day Kōchi Prefecture on the island of Shikoku. Chōsokabe Motochika, who unified Shikoku, was the twenty-first daimyō (or head) of the clan.

In their early history of the Sengoku period, Chōsokabe Kunichika's father Kanetsugu, was killed by the Motoyama clan in 1508. Therefore, Kunichika was raised by the aristocrat Ichijō Husaie of the Ichijō clan in Tosa Province. Later, towards the end of his life, Kunichika took revenge on the Motoyama clan and destroyed them with the help of the Ichijō in 1560. Kunichika would go on to have children, including his heir and the future Daimyo of the Chōsokabe, Motochika, who would go on to unify Shikoku.

First, the Ichijō family was overthrown by Motochika in 1574. Later, he gained control of the rest of Tosa due to his victories at the Battle of Watarigawa in 1575. He then also destroyed the Kono and the Soga clan. Over the ensuing decade, he extended his power to all of Shikoku in 1583. However, in 1585, Toyotomi Hideyoshi (Oda Nobunaga's successor) invaded that island with a force of 100,000 men, led by Ukita Hideie, Kobayakawa Takakage, Kikkawa Motonaga, Toyotomi Hidenaga, and Toyotomi Hidetsugu. Motochika surrendered, and forfeited Awa, Sanuki, and Iyo Provinces; Hideyoshi permitted him to retain Tosa.

Under Hideyoshi, Motochika and his son Chōsokabe Nobuchika participated in the invasion of neighboring Kyūshū, in which Nobuchika died. In 1590, Motochika led a naval fleet in the Siege of Odawara, and also fought in the Japanese invasions of Korea led by Toyotomi Hideyoshi in 1592.

After Motochika died in 1599 at age 61, the next clan leader was his son Chōsokabe Morichika. He led the clan forces in support of the Toyotomi at the Battle of Sekigahara. After 1600, the Chōsokabe were removed as daimyo of Tosa.

After the Siege of Osaka in 1615, Morichika was executed and the clan was ended as a political and military force.

Among the retainers to the clan were Kōsokabe Chikayasu, Tani Tadasumi, Hisatake Chikanao, Yoshida Takayori, Yoshida Shigetoshi, Yoshida Masashige.

Shirō Sōkabe, the 19th century missionary, was a descendant of the Chōsokabe clan.

== Clan heads ==
1. Chōsokabe Yoshitoshi (長宗我部能俊)
2. Chōsokabe Toshimune (長宗我部俊宗)
3. Chōsokabe Tadatoshi (長宗我部忠俊)
4. Chōsokabe Shigeuji (長宗我部重氏)
5. Chōsokabe Ujiyuki (長宗我部氏幸)
6. Chōsokabe Kiyoyuki (長宗我部満幸)
7. Chōsokabe Kanemitsu (長宗我部兼光)
8. Chōsokabe Shigetoshi (長宗我部重俊)
9. Chōsokabe Shigetaka (長宗我部重高)
10. Chōsokabe Shigemune (長宗我部重宗)
11. Chōsokabe Nobuyoshi (長宗我部信能)
12. Chōsokabe Kaneyoshi (長宗我部兼能)
13. Chōsokabe Kanetsuna (長宗我部兼綱)
14. Chōsokabe Yoshishige (長宗我部能重)
15. Chōsokabe Motochika (長宗我部元親)
16. Chōsokabe Fumikane (長宗我部文兼)
17. Chōsokabe Motokado (長宗我部元門, died 1471)
18. Chōsokabe Katsuchika (長宗我部雄親, died 1478)
19. Chōsokabe Kanetsugu (長宗我部兼序, died 1508)
20. Chōsokabe Kunichika (長宗我部国親, 1504–1560)
21. Chōsokabe Motochika (長宗我部元親, 1539–1599)
22. Chōsokabe Morichika (長宗我部盛親, 1575–1615)
23. Chōsokabe Moritsune (長宗我部盛恒, died 1615)

== Other members ==
- Akohime - daughter of Chōsokabe Motochika, she was the last notable survivor of the clan after the Siege of Osaka; being responsible for continuing the Chōsokabe's lineage in Sendai domain.

== Prominent castles ==
- Okō Castle, the original base of power for the Chōsokabe clan
- Urato Castle, base of power for the Chōsokabe clan since 1591
- Kira Castle
- Aki Castle
- Amagiri Castle
- Ichinomiya Castle

== Popular culture ==
The Chōsokabe clan and Chōsokabe Motochika in particular are featured in many franchises set in the Sengoku period such as Sengoku Basara, Samurai Warriors, Nioh 2, Nobunaga's Ambition and Total War: Shogun 2. Portrayals vary somewhat and some of them are very much fictionalized. For example, Total War: Shogun 2 portrays the clan as master archers while Sengoku Basara portrays them as pirates.

== See also ==
- Okō Castle, home castle of Chōsokabe clan, now in ruins
- Ichiryō gusoku, a group of farmer-samurai who served the Chōsokabe clan
