= Tosa Province =

Former province of Japan

Map of Japanese provinces (1868) with Tosa Province highlighted

Tosa Province (土佐国, Tosa no Kuni; Japanese pronunciation: [tó̞.sä̀ (nò̞ kɯ̈̀.ɲ̟ì), tò̞.sä́ (nò̞ kɯ̈̀.ɲ̟ì)]) was a province of Japan in the area of southern Shikoku. Tosa bordered on Awa to the northeast, and Iyo to the northwest. Its abbreviated form name was Doshū (土州). In terms of the Gokishichidō system, Tosa was one of the provinces of the Nankaidō circuit. Under the Engishiki classification system, Tosa was ranked as one of the "middle countries" (中国) in terms of importance, and one of the "far countries" (遠国) in terms of distance from the capital. The provincial capital was located in what is now the city of Nankoku. The ichinomiya of the province is the Tosa shrine located in the city of Kōchi.

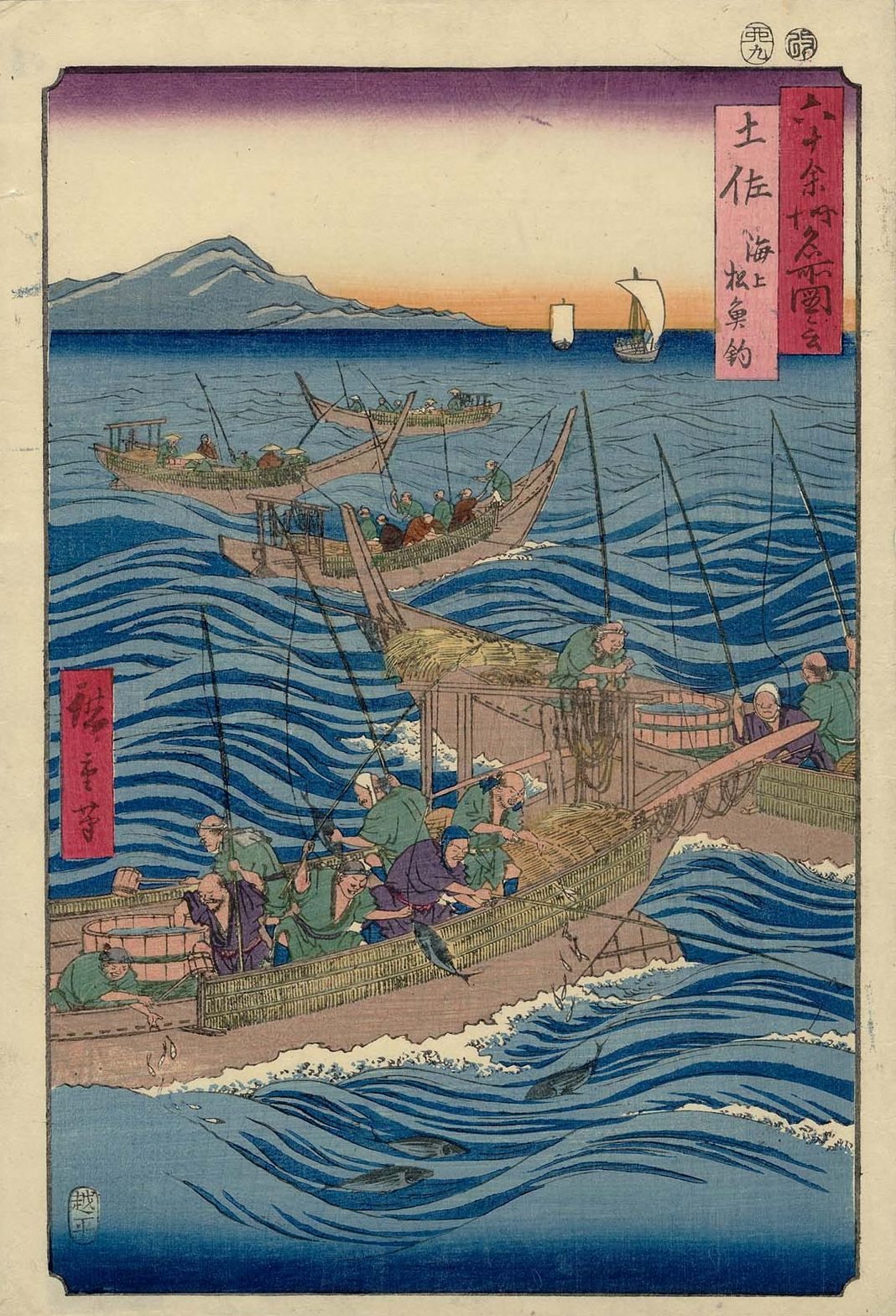
Hiroshige ukiyo-e "Tosa" in "The Famous Scenes of the Sixty States" (六十余州名所図会), depicting katsuo fishing

== History ==
Tosa Province was formed by the Ritsuryo reforms by combining the territories of the Tosa kuni no miyatsuko (都佐国造) who ruled in the east with the Hata kuni no miyatsuko (波多国造) who ruled in the west. The name "Tosa" appears in the Nihon Shoki in an entry dated March 675. In many subsequent entries, Tosa is mentioned usually in connection with some natural disaster, including the 684 Hakuhō earthquake in which it was reported that a ship carrying the provincial governor had been swept away by a tsunami, and a new imperial governor was sent from the capital. The province appears to have been used as a penal colony or place of exile from the Asuka period. At the end of the Heian period, Minamoto no Mareyoshi, the younger brother of Minamoto no Yoritomo was exiled by the Heike clan. Other prominent exiles included Fujiwara no Moronaga, Emperor Tsuchimikado, and Prince Takanaga. In the Kamakura period, the Ichijō family of court nobles established a huge shōen landed estate in western Tosa, and ruled the area into the Sengoku period. During the Muromachi period, the Hosokawa clan were shugo of Tosa Province, but preferred to rule via proxy, using the Ohira clan, while remaining in Kyoto. When income from the manor tended to stop due to the Onin War, Kanpaku Ichijo Norifusa (with help of the Ohira clan) relocated to Tosa and became a local power controlling Hata and Takaoka Counties in western Tosa. The remainder of the province and controlled by the Motoyama, Aki, Kira, Tsuno, Chōsokabe and the Kosokabe clans. Under Chōsokabe Motochika, the Chōsokabe came to control all of Tosa, and later, to expand into all of Shikoku. They were stopped only by the forces of Toyotomi Hideyoshi, who restricted them only to their territories in Tosa Province. Chōsokabe Motochika's son Chōsokabe Morichika was dispossessed as he sided with the losing Western army at the Battle of Sekigahara in 1600. Under the Tokugawa shogunate, the province was assigned to Yamauchi Kazutoyo and the Yamauchi clan continued to rule the province as daimyō of Tosa Domain until the Meiji restoration. Under the Yamauchi, Kōchi Castle was built and the jōkamachi of Kochi city became the capital of the province. During the Bakumatsu period, many prominent people were active in the overthrow of the shogunate and establishing the early Meiji government, including Sakamoto Ryōma, Nakaoka Shintarō, Itagaki Taisuke, Gotō Shōjirō.

Bakumatsu period domains
Name	Clan	Type	kokudaka
Tosa Domain	Yamauchi clan	tozama	202,600 koku

Per the early Meiji period Kyudaka kyuryo Torishirabe-chō (旧高旧領取調帳), an official government assessment of the nation’s resources, the province had 348 villages with a total kokudaka of 494,087 koku. Tosa Province consisted of the following districts:

Districts of Tosa Province
District	kokudaka	villages	status	Current municipalities
Agawa (吾川郡)	42,242 koku	50 villages		Ino, Niyodo, parts of Kōchi, Tosa, Ochi
Aki (安芸郡)	51,420 koku	47 villages		Toyo, Nahari, Tano, Yasuda, Kitagawa, Umaji, Geisei
Hata (幡多郡)	103,218 koku	109 villages		Otsuki, Kuroshio, Mihara, parts of Sukumo, Tosashimizu, Shimanto
Kami (香美郡)	68,762 koku	30 villages	dissolved	Kanan, most of Kami, parts of Aki, Nankoku, Geisei
Nagaoka (長岡郡)	71,422 koku	38 villages		Motoyama, Otoyo, most of Nankoku, parts of Kochi, Kami, Tosa
Takaoka (高岡郡)	107,098 koku	61 villages		Nakatosa, Sakawa, Ochi, Yusuhara, Hidaka, Tsuno, Shimanto
Tosa (土佐郡)	49,921 koku	23 villages		Tosa, Okawa, parts of Kochi, Ino

Following the abolition of the han system in 1871, Tosa Province became Kochi Prefecture.

The Imperial Japanese Navy battleship Tosa, lead ship of its class, was named after the province.

== Gallery ==
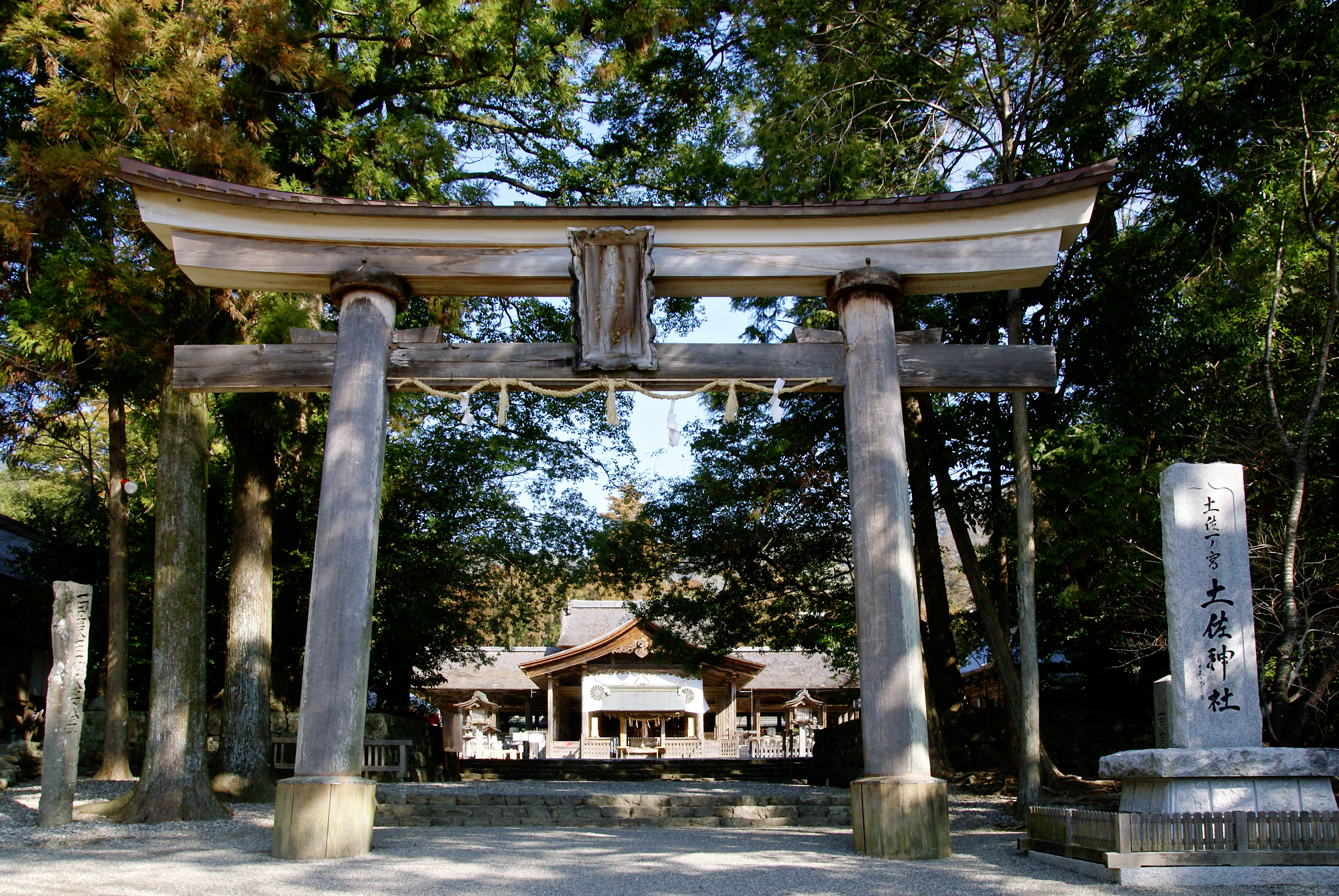
Tosa Jinja, one of the ichinomiya of the province

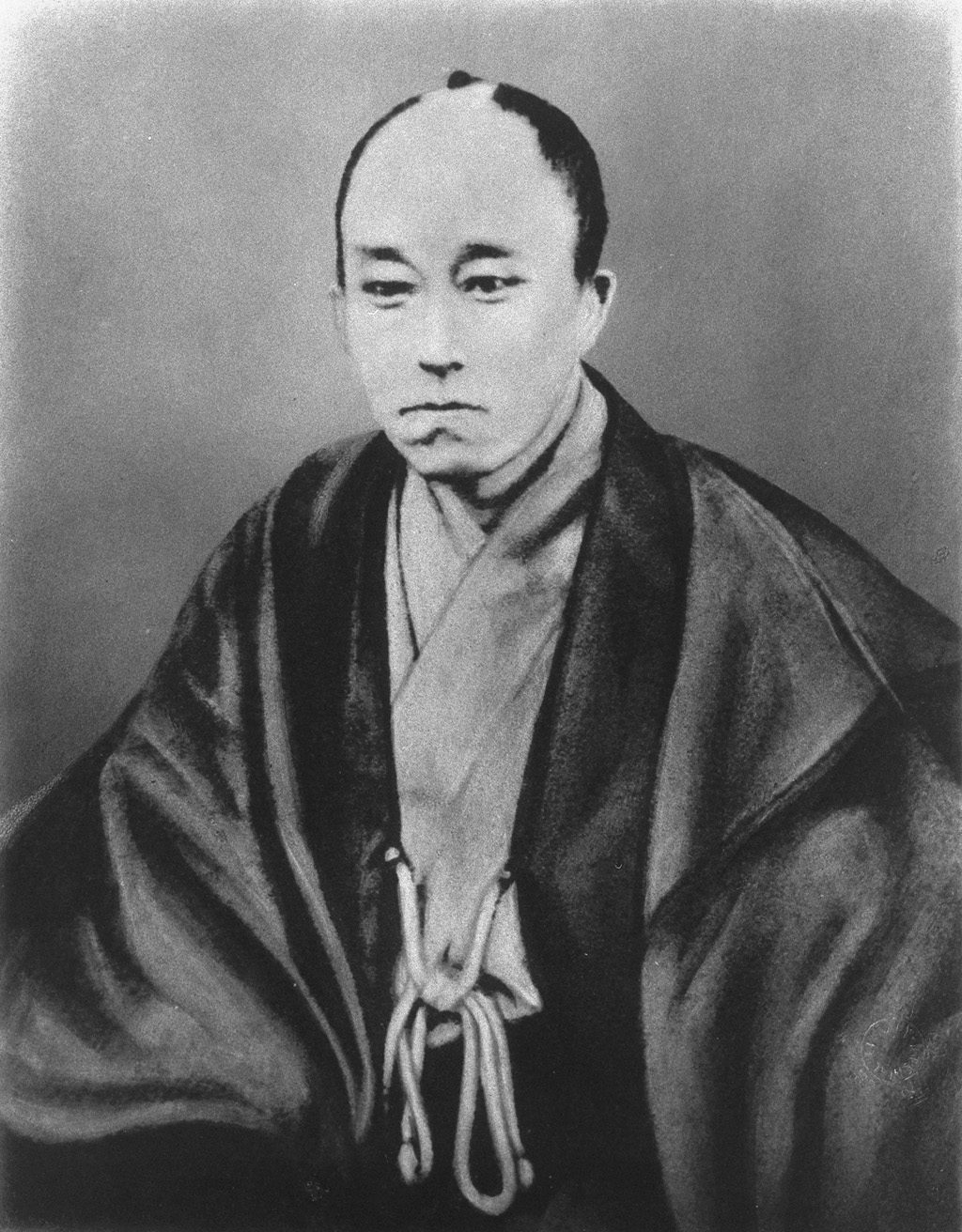
Yamauchi Yōdō, Bakumatsu period daimyō of Tosa

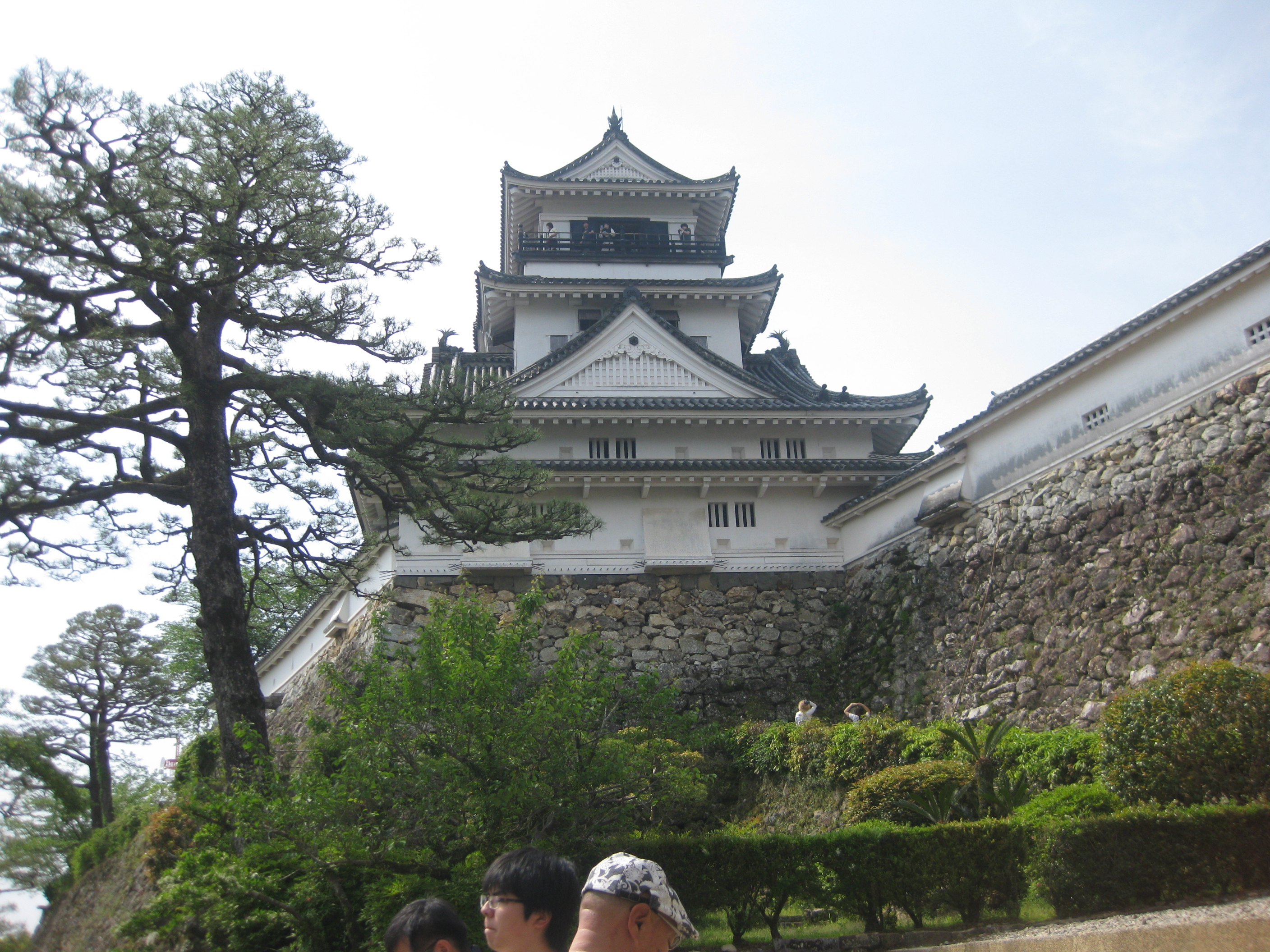
Kōchi Castle

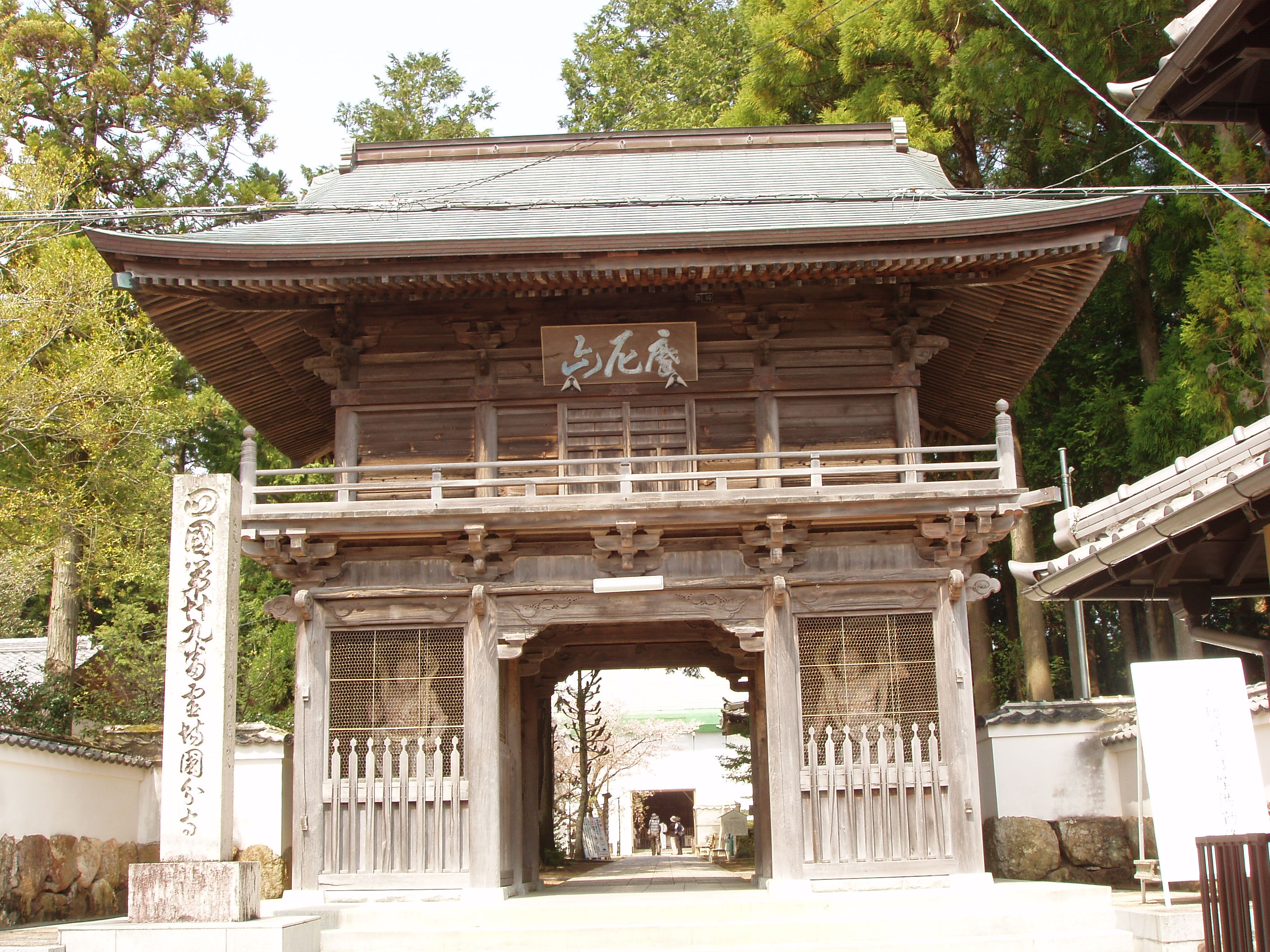
Sanmon of Tosa Kokubun-ji
