= Marugame Castle =

Castle in Marugame, Japan

- 丸亀城
- Ichibancho, Marugame-shi, Kagawa-ken 763-0025 Japan
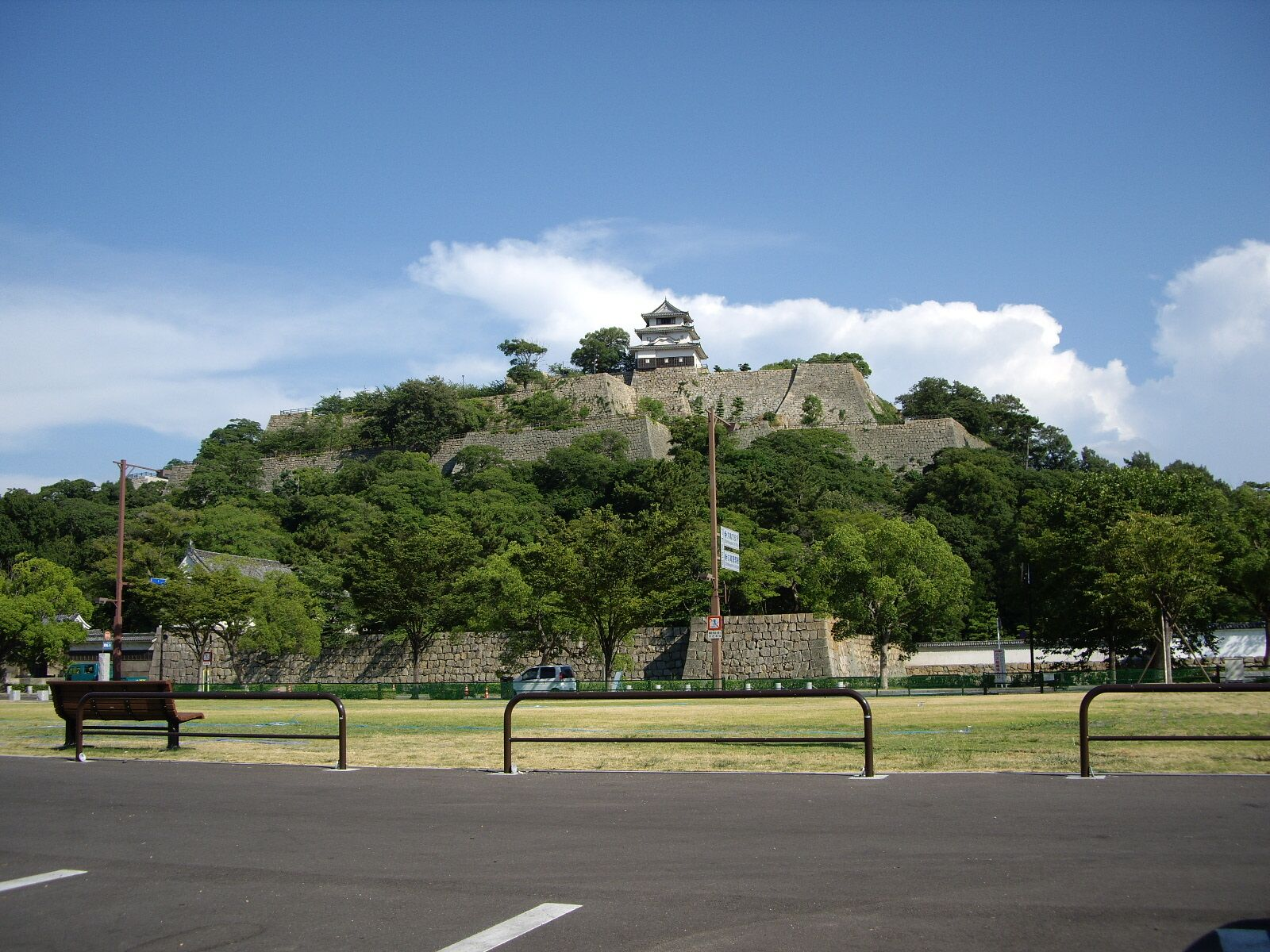

Site information
- Type: Hirayamashiro (hilltop castle)

Location
- Coordinates: 34°17′10.63″N 133°48′0.35″E
- Height: Thee stories (tenshu)

Site history
- Built by: Nara Motoyasu
- In use: 1587–1615; 1644–1945
- Materials: Earth, stone, and wood

Marugame Castle (丸亀城, Marugame-jō) is an Edo Period Japanese castle in the city of Marugame, Kagawa Prefecture, Japan. It is located in the center of Marugame city, in former Sanuki Province on the island of Shikoku. During the Edo Period, it was the center of Marugame Domain, ruled by the tozama Kyōgoku clan under the Tokugawa Shogunate. The castle site has been protected as a National Historic Site since 1953. Marugame Castle is one of only a dozen Japanese castles to have an original wooden 'tenshu' built before 1860.

== History ==
Marugame Castle is located on Kameyama hill at the center of the city of Marugame, in western Sanuki Province. During the Muromachi period, this area was ruled by the Kagawa clan, originally from Sagami Province, from their stronghold at Amagiri Castle in what is now the city of Zentsuji. The Kagawa clan were vassals of the Hosokawa clan, but changed their fealty to the Miyoshi clan and then the Chosokabe clan due to the fluctuating balance of power in the region. However, the clan was dispossessed when the area was conquered by Toyotomi Hideyoshi in the Sengoku period. Hideyoshi awarded all of Sanuki Province to Ikoma Chikamasa in 1587.. Chikamasa first made his stronghold at Hiketa Castle, but it was inconveniently located at the eastern edge of Sanuki, and built Takamatsu Castle in a more central location to be his seat. For control of western Sanuki, he started construction of a castle at Kameyama hill and named it "Marugame Castle". He turned this castle over to his son, Ikoma Kazumasa. At the time of the Battle of Sekigahara in 1600, Chikamasa continued to support Ishida Mitsunari and the Western Army loyal to the Toyotomi clan; however, he sent his son Kazumasa to join Tokugawa Ieyasu's Eastern Army so that the clan would survive no matter what the outcome. After the establishment of the Tokugawa shogunate, the Ikoma clan were confirmed in their holdings in Sanuki Province. In 1615, the shogunate issued the Ikkoku Ichijōj law which allowed each domain only one castle. As the seat of the Ikoma clan was Takamatsu Castle, Marugame Castle had to be abolished.

In 1640, the Ikoma clan was demoted to Yashima Domain in Dewa Province by the shogunate in 1640 due to attainder following an uprising, and their holdings were divided. The area around Marugame was awarded to Yamazaki Ieharu, formerly of Tomioka Domain in Higo Province. Yamazaki Ieharu was noted at castle construction, having participated in the reconstructions of Osaka Castle and Shimabara Castle amongst others, and decided to rebuild Marugame Castle with 20-meter stone walls and on a scale above its relatively small territory. The Yamazaki clan died out after three generations in 1658 and was replaced by a cadet branch of the Kyōgoku clan from Tatsuno Domain in Harima Province. Under the Kyōgoku clan, the current three-story tenshu was built in 1660 and the castle was considered completed in 1670. The Kyōgoku continued to rule from Marugame Castle to the end of the Edo period. The domain was an early and staunch supporter of the Imperial side in the Bakumatsu period. After the Meiji restoration, in 1869, a fire swept through the castle and destroyed the daimyō palace and the Inui Yagura turret. In 1870, the outer moats were filled in and in 1872 the remaining castle structures were placed on public auction for demolition. However, the auction was cancelled by order of the Imperial Japanese Army, which laid claim to the castle site for use by the newly formed IJA 12th Infantry Regiment. In 1876 the remaining yagura turrets and most of the remaining walls were destroyed, but the tenshu and central portion of the castle were preserved. This area was opened to the public in 1919 as "Kameyama Park", and in 1933, the Enjukan, a villa owned by the Kyōgoku clan in the castle town was relocated to its current site within the San-no-maru Bailey. The moats were reclaimed in 1948. The Marugame City Museum, which exhibits historical materials related to Marugame Castle and the Kyōgoku clan opened in 1972.

Marugame Castle was listed as one of Japan's Top 100 Castles by the Japan Castle Foundation in 2006.

The castle is located a 15 minute walk from then JR Shikoku Yosan Line Marugame Station.

=== Cultural Properties ===
- The Tenshu (天守) of Marugame Castle has been protected as an Important Cultural Property since 1943
- The Ote Ichi-no-mon (丸亀城 大手一の門) is a masugata-style gate built in 1670. It has been protected as an Important Cultural Property since 1957
- The Ote Ni-no-mon (丸亀城 大手二の門) is a masugata-style gate built in 1670. It has been protected as an Important Cultural Property since 1957

== See also ==
- List of Historic Sites of Japan (Kagawa)

== Gallery ==
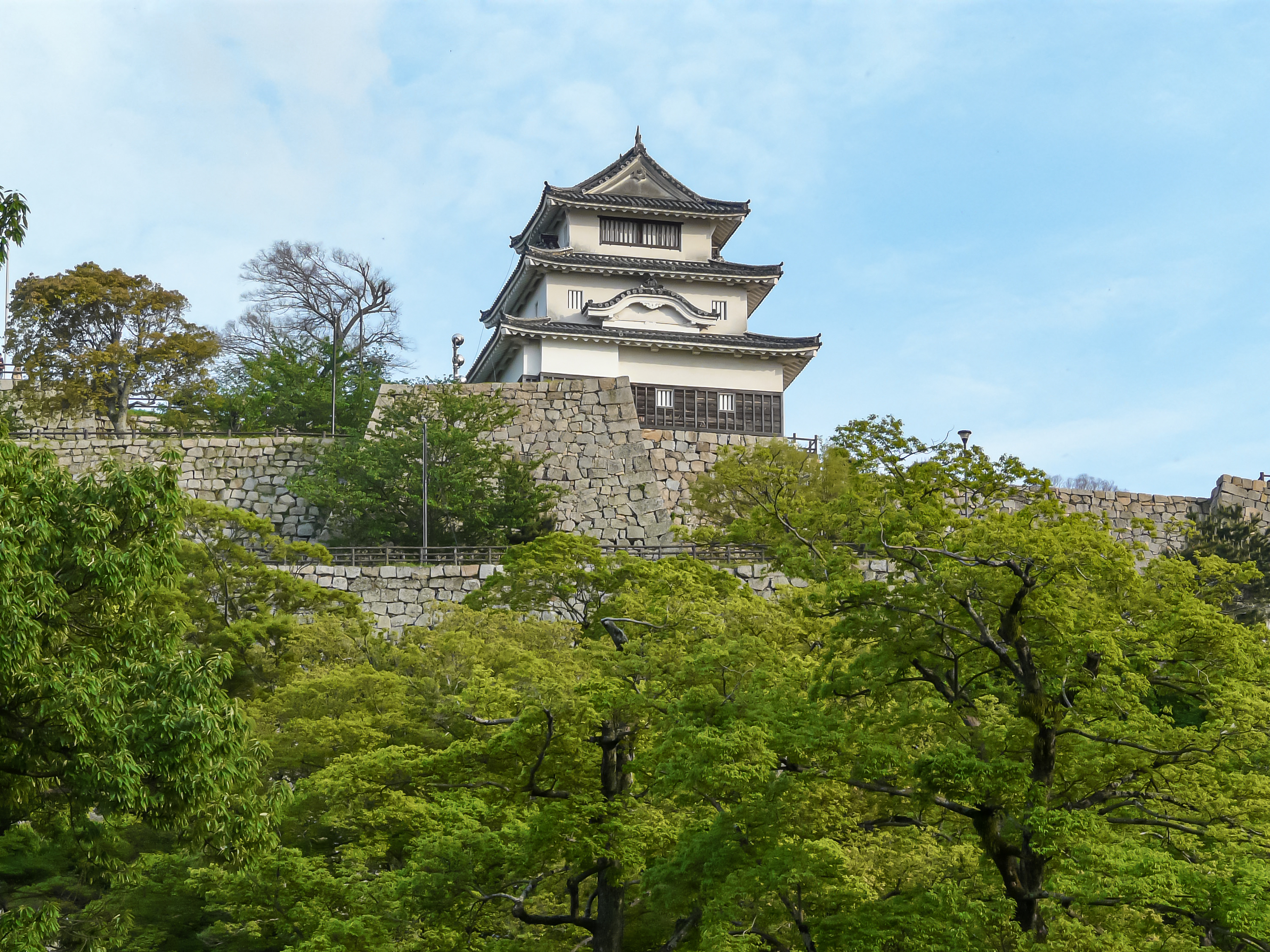
Marugame Castle tenshu

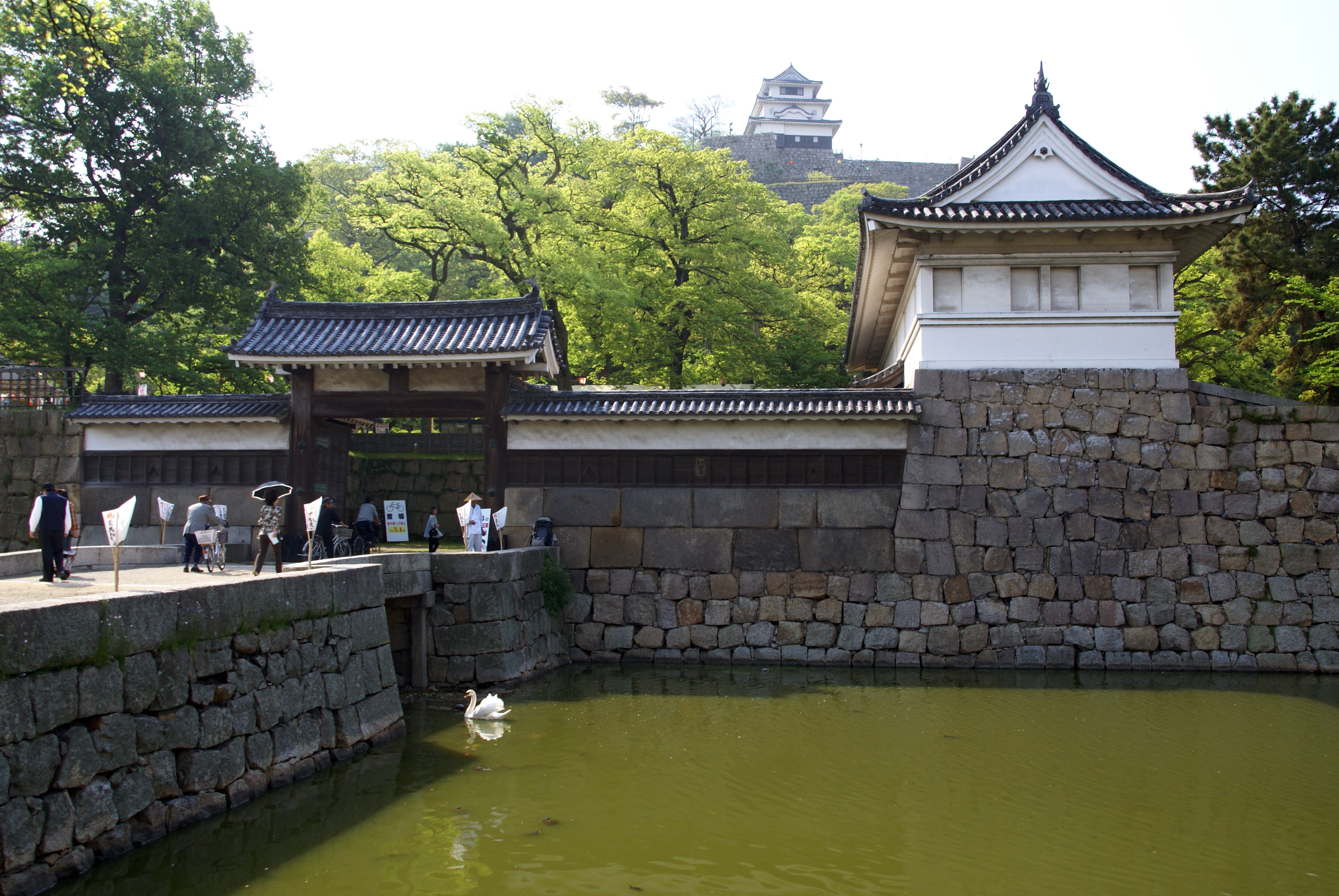
View from Ote Ni-no-mon

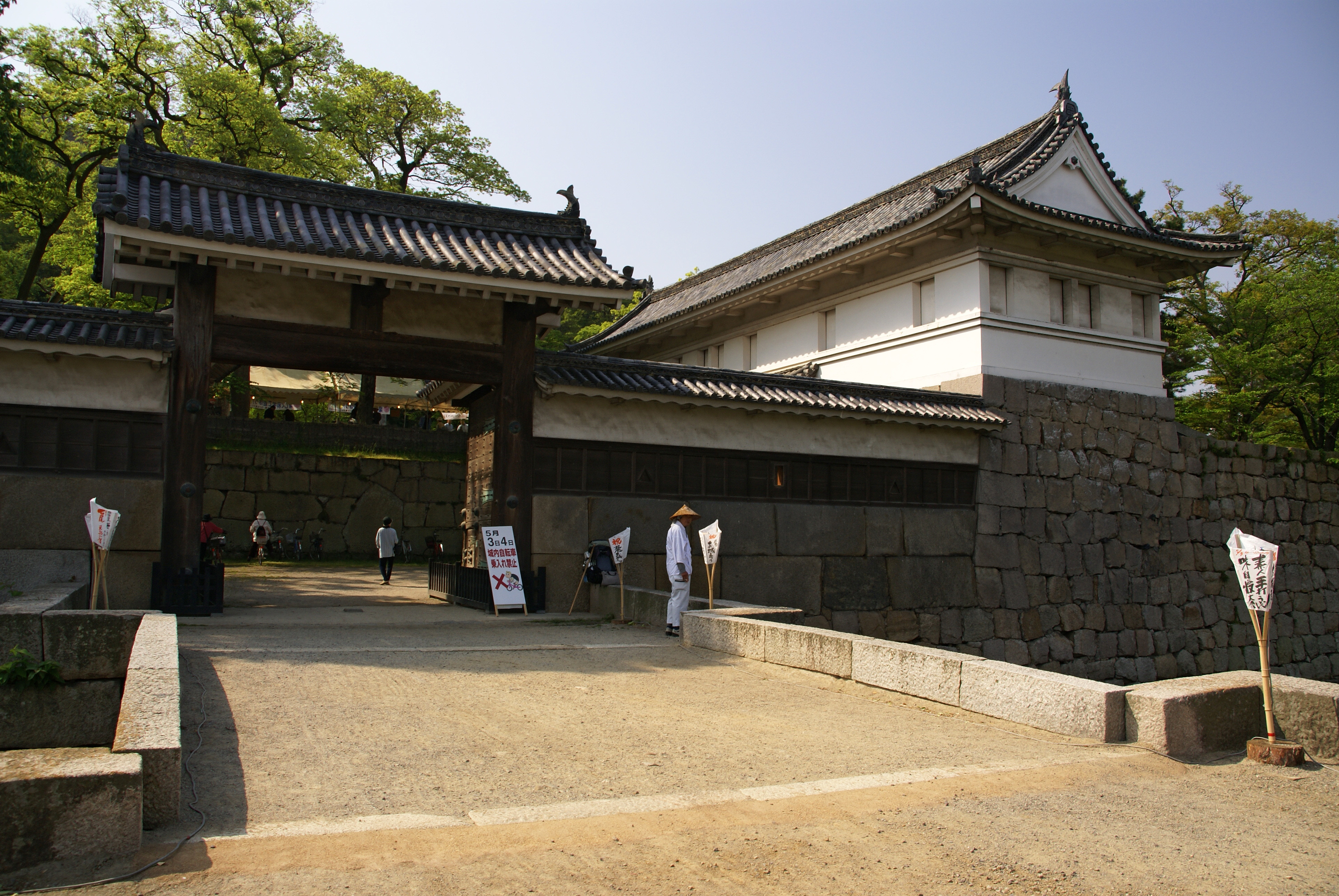
Ote Ni-no-mon

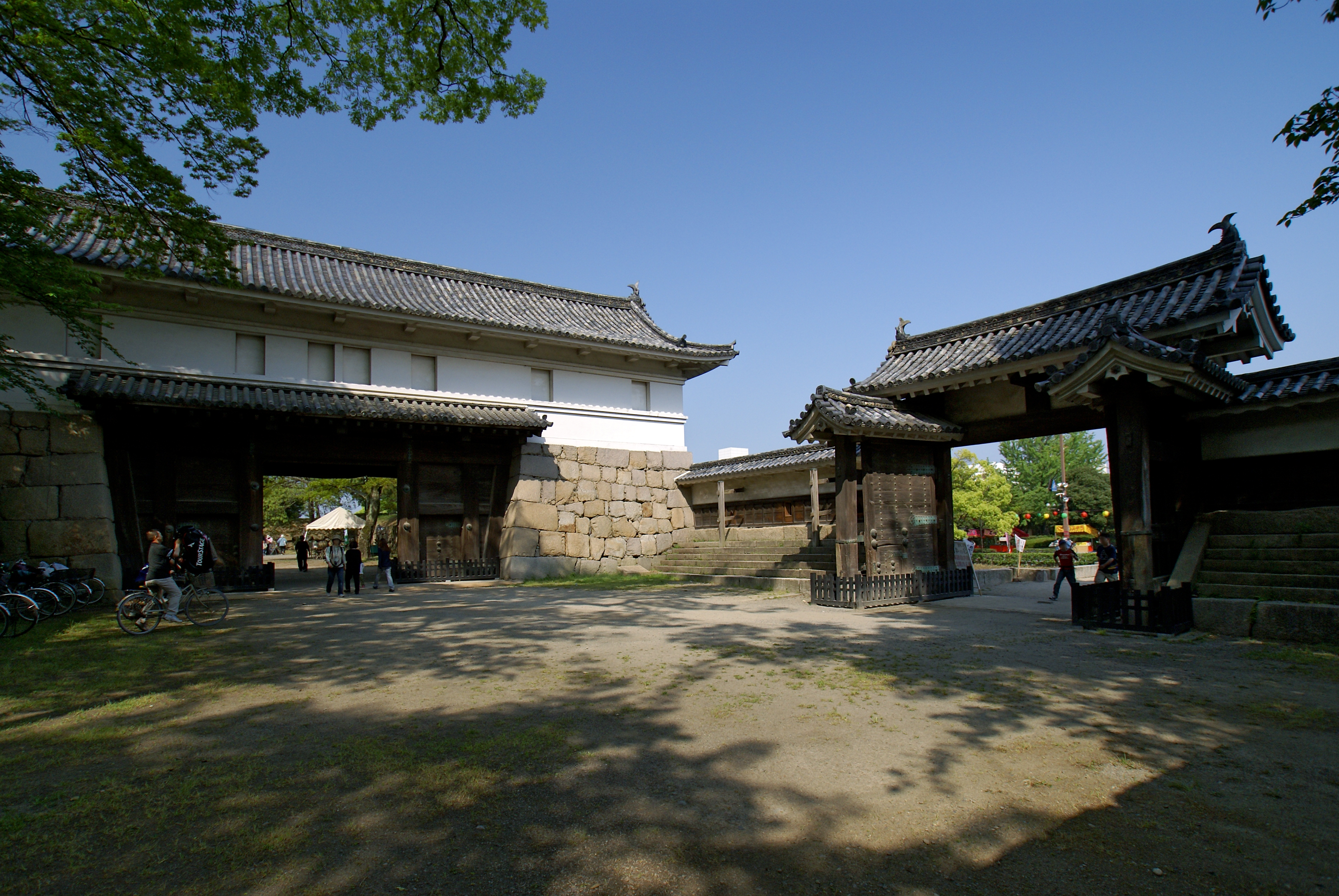
Ote Ichi-no-mon (right) Ote Ni-no-Mon (left)

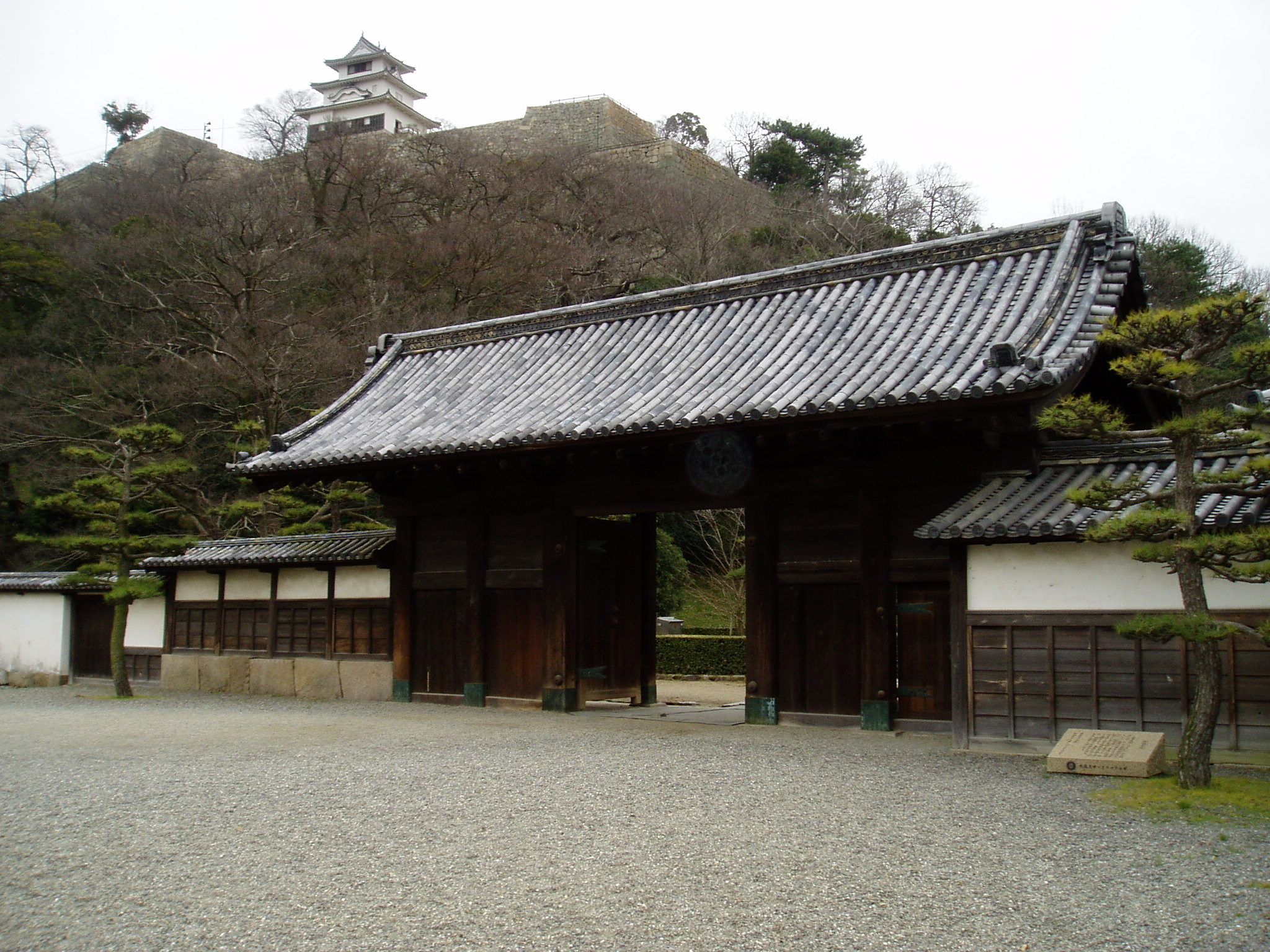
Goten front gate and Tenshu

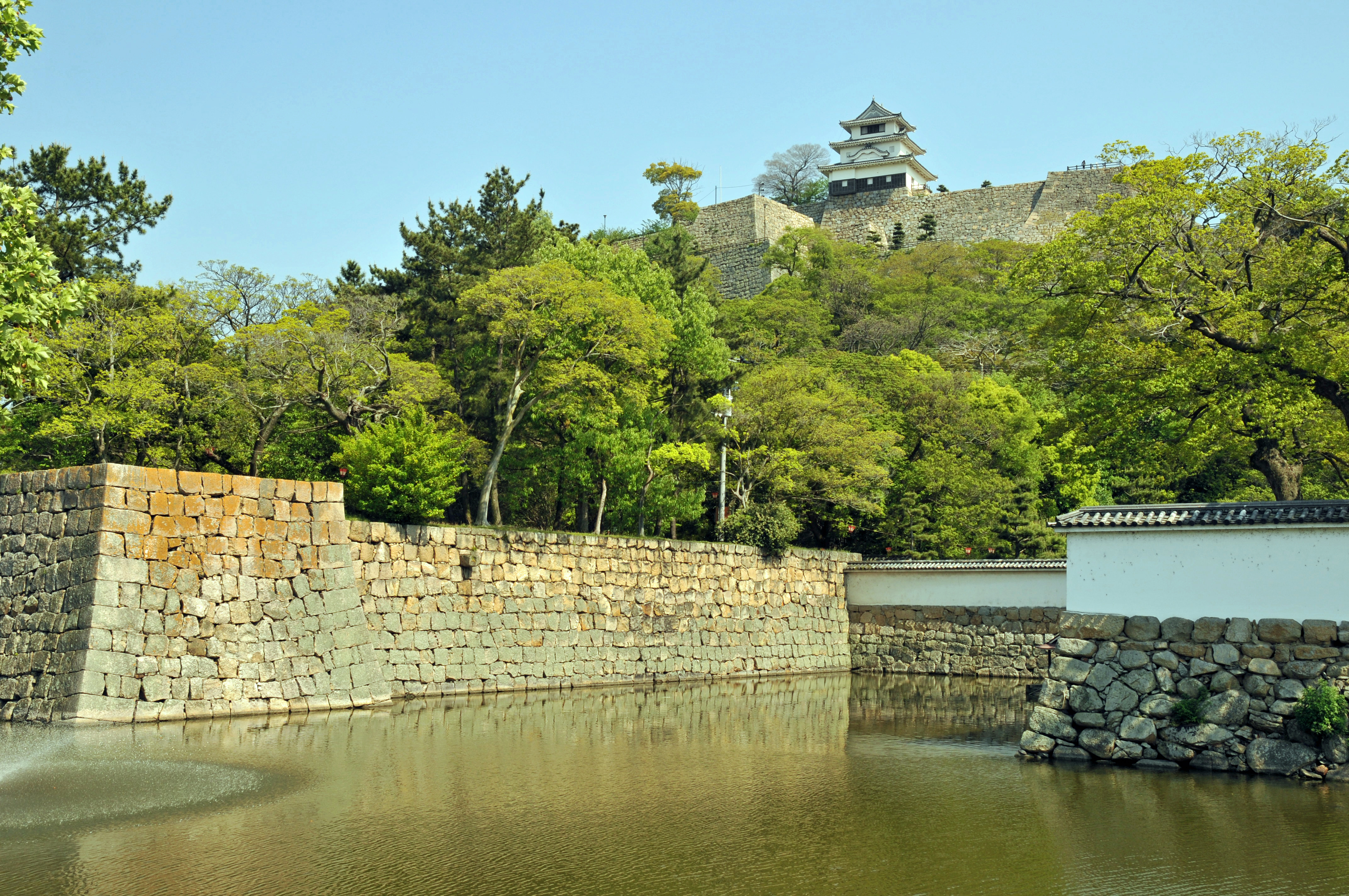
Marugame Castle stone walls

== Literature ==
- De Lange, William (2021). An Encyclopedia of Japanese Castles. Groningen: Toyo Press. pp. 600 pages. ISBN 978-9492722300.
- Schmorleitz, Morton S. (1974). Castles in Japan. Tokyo: Charles E. Tuttle Co. pp. 144–145. ISBN 0-8048-1102-4.
- Motoo, Hinago (1986). Japanese Castles. Tokyo: Kodansha. p. 200 pages. ISBN 0-87011-766-1.
- Mitchelhill, Jennifer (2004). Castles of the Samurai: Power and Beauty. Tokyo: Kodansha. p. 112 pages. ISBN 4-7700-2954-3.
- Turnbull, Stephen (2003). Japanese Castles 1540-1640. Osprey Publishing. p. 64 pages. ISBN 1-84176-429-9.
