= Kagawa Chikakazu =

Japanese samurai

- 香川 親和
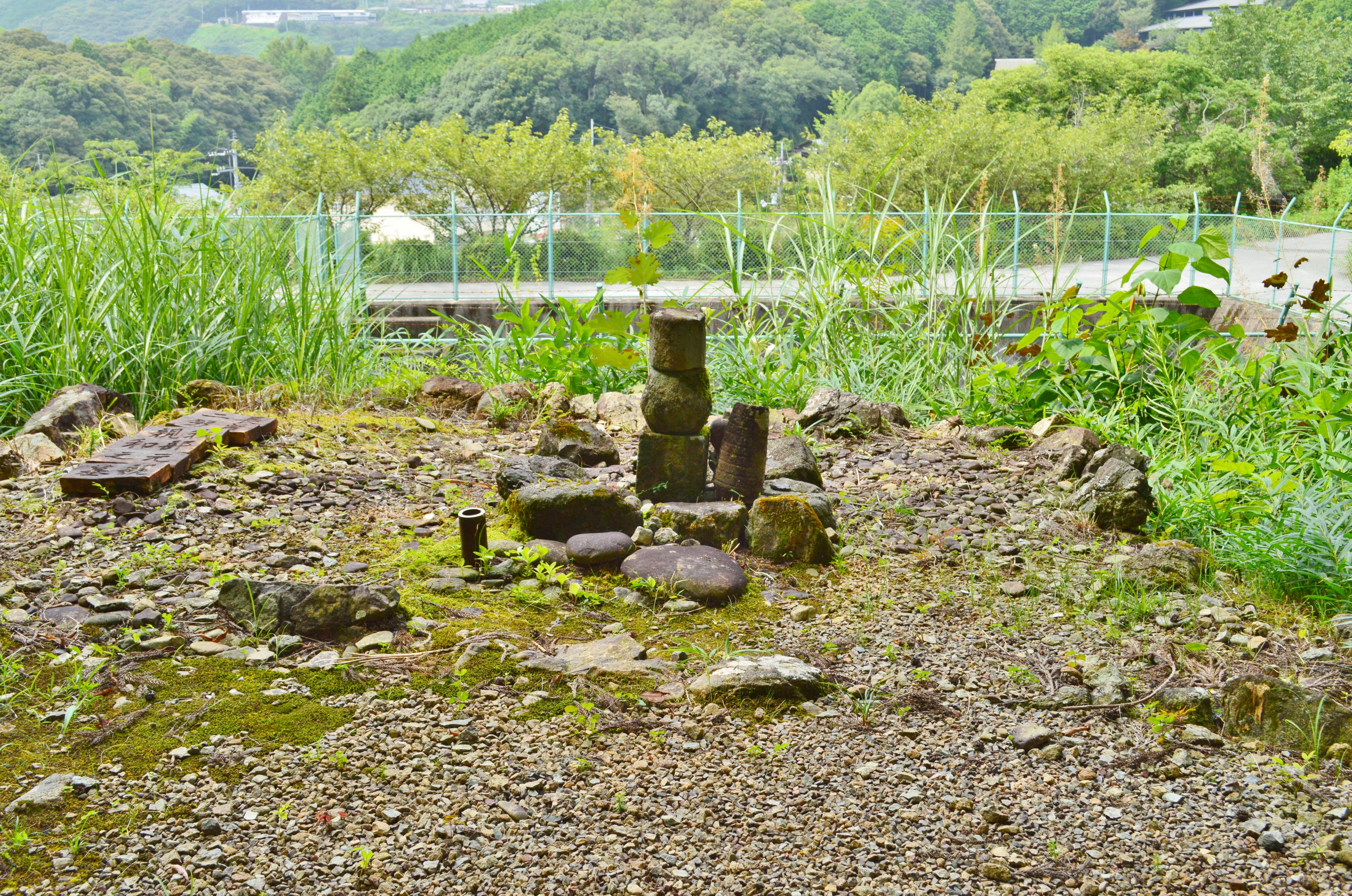
- Tomb of Kagawa Chikakazu near the Okō Castle
- Born: 1567; Tosa Province
- Died: 1587 (aged 19–20); Okō Castle, Tosa Province
- Relatives: Chōsokabe Motochika (father); Kagawa Yukikage (adopted father)
- Military career
- Allegiance: Chōsokabe clan
- Unit: Kagawa clan
- Commands: Amagiri Castle
- Conflicts: Invasion of Shikoku (1585)

Kagawa Chikakazu (香川親和; 1567 – 1587) also known as Chōsokabe Chikakazu was a Japanese samurai of the Sengoku period. He was the second son of Chōsokabe Motochika who was adopted by the Kagawa clan in Amagiri Castle.

After Chōsokabe clan's successor Chōsokabe Nobuchika's death in the Battle of Hetsugigawa, Toyotomi Hideyoshi advised Chōsokabe Motochika to make Chikakazu as a successor. However, Motochika selected his favored Chōsokabe Morichika for Chōsokabe clan's successor. Chikakazu died at the age of 20 because of illness in 1587.
