= Siege of Akizuki =

1587 siege in Japan

Coordinates: 33.46586°N 130.69538°E

- Part of Toyotomi Hideyoshi's Kyūshū Campaign
Date	1587
Location	Oguma castle, Chikuzen province, Kyūshū
Result	Toyotomi Hideyoshi victory
Territorial changes	Siege succeeds; castle falls.

Belligerents
forces of Akizuki clan	forces of Toyotomi Hideyoshi

Commanders and leaders
Akizuki Tanezane; Akizuki Tanenaga	Toyotomi Hideyoshi

The 1587 siege of Akizuki, also known as the siege of Oguma, was undertaken by Japanese warlord Toyotomi Hideyoshi against the Akizuki clan's Oguma castle, as part of his campaign to conquer Kyūshū.

== Background ==
After seizing the nearby Ganjaku castle, controlled by a retainer to the Akizuki, Hideyoshi turned his attention to the Akizuki clan's home castle.

== Siege ==
As his army approached and prepared for the siege, Akizuki Tanezane, the lord of the castle, escaped and fled in the night. Taking the castle, Hideyoshi is said to have covered the walls in white paper, to give the illusion that he had the resources to replaster the entire castle overnight. Seeing this, Tanezane surrendered without a fight.

== See also ==
- Akizuki Rebellion (1876)
