= Asano, Kagawa =

Dissolved municipality in Nakatado district, Kagawa prefecture, Japan

Asano 麻野村
- Village
- Etymology: Merged from Ōsa (大麻村) and Ikano (生野村) villages.
- Interactive map of Asano
- Coordinates: 34.28°N 133.77°E
- Country: Japan
- Prefecture: Kagawa Prefecture
- District: Tado District (until 1899), Nakatado District (from 1899)
- Established: 15 February 1890

Government
  - Type: Village Government
  - Body: Village Assembly

Population (1901)
  - Total: Unknown
- Time zone: UTC+9:00 (JST)
- ISO 3166 code: JP-37
- Merged into Zentsuji-cho on 3 November 1901.

Asano (麻野村, Asano-mura) was a village located in Nakatado District, Kagawa Prefecture, Japan, from 1890 to 1901.

On 15 February 1890, the villages of Ōsa (大麻村) and Ikano (生野村) merged to form the village of Asano. Tado District merged with Naka District to become Nakatado District on 1 April 1899. Then on 3 November 1901, Asano merged with Yoshida and Zentsuji villages, becoming Zentsuji-cho town. What was once Asano is now part of Zentsūji.
