= Okyō =

Japanese female Samurai

Okyō (於京) or Okyō no Kata (お京の方) was a Japanese female warrior (onna-musha) from the Sengoku period. She served Aso Koremitsu alongside her husband, Kiyama Masachika. When Higo province was divided between Konishi Yukinaga and Katō Kiyomasa in 1587, on the completion of the Kyushu Campaign, Kiyomasa invaded the lands of the Aso clan and Okyo volunteered for the defense.

== Siege of Hondo Castle ==
Okyo no Kata‘s early life is not recorded in historical registers. She was married with Kiyama Masachika (木山正親) of Higo province. Her husband was a samurai warlord who first served the Ryuzoji clan and later the Aso clan. Okyo is best known for dueling the famous samurai, Kato Kiyomasa, to a single fight.

In the year 1589, during the Battle of Hotokezaka, her husband Masachika was defeated in a duel with Kato Kiyomasa. Following his defeat, Kiyomasa and the allied forces of Konishi Yukinaga besieged Hondo Castle. OKyō no Kata, dressed in her husband's armor and disguised as a man, rode out with a force of over thirty female warriors. However, while passing by a plum tree, her helmet became entangled in its branches, leaving her unable to move and ultimately leading to her death in battle. It is said that in her final moments, she cursed the plum tree, saying, "Detestable plum branch, though you bloom, never bear fruit," and since then, the tree has never borne fruit.

This plum tree, known as "Kabuto Ume" (兜梅), remains preserved within the grounds of Enkeiji Temple in Amakusa City.

== Sources ==
- "Tenshō no Amakusa Gassenki" (『天正の天草合戦記』), published by the Amakusa Historical and Cultural Heritage Association.
