= Kyūshū campaign =

Conflict of the Sengoku Period of Japan

Coordinates: 33°N 131°E

- Part of Sengoku period
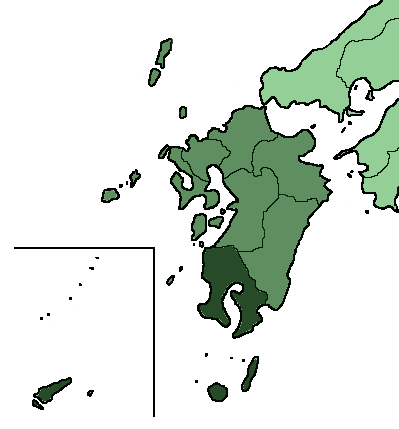
- The island of Kyūshū, with modern-day Kagoshima prefecture, roughly corresponding to the Shimazu family's home province of Satsuma highlighted.
Date	1586–87
Location	Kyūshū, Japan
Result	Toyotomi victory
Territorial changes	Toyotomi clan conquest of Kyūshū

Belligerents
Toyotomi clan Ōtomo clan Chōsokabe clan Mōri clan	Shimazu clan Akizuki clan

Commanders and leaders
Toyotomi Hideyoshi; Toyotomi Hidenaga; Otomo Sorin; Chosokabe Motochika; Kobayakawa Takakage; Mizuno Tadashige	Shimazu Yoshihisa; Shimazu Yoshihiro; Shimazu Toshihisa; Shimazu Toyohisa; Shimazu Iehisa; Akizuki Tanezane

Strength
200,000	30,000

The Kyūshū campaign of 1586–1587 was part of the campaigns of Toyotomi Hideyoshi who sought to dominate Japan at the end of the Sengoku period. Having subjugated much of Honshū and Shikoku, Hideyoshi turned his attention to the southernmost of the main Japanese islands, Kyūshū.

== Course of events ==
Battles had raged for the previous few years between the daimyō of Kyūshū, and by 1585 the Shimazu family of Satsuma were the primary power on the island.

In 1586, the Shimazu clan heard of Hideyoshi's plans for invasion, and lifted their siege of Tachibana castle, withdrawing a great portion of their forces back to Higo province, while the rest stayed in Bungo province. There, they seized Funai Castle from the Ōtomo clan and prepared for the invasion.

The Ōtomo were supported by armies under Sengoku Hidehisa, Sogō Masayasu, and Chōsokabe Motochika a major Shikoku lord who had been defeated by Hideyoshi the previous year, and had thus joined him. Though Bungo province ultimately fell to the Shimazu, Sengoku and Chōsokabe delayed them and weakened them in preparation for the arrival of Hideyoshi's armies and those of the Mōri clan under Kobayakawa Takakage, another ally of Hideyoshi.

Hashiba Hidenaga, half-brother to Hideyoshi, landed to the south of Bungo, attacking the Shimazu at Takajō, on Kyūshū's eastern coast, in 1587. Meanwhile, Hideyoshi took his own forces down a more westerly route, attacking Ganjaku Castle in Chikuzen province, which was held by the Akizuki clan. Later that year, the two brothers would meet up in the Shimazu's home province of Satsuma, to assault their home castle at Kagoshima. Ultimately, Kagoshima itself was not attacked; the Shimazu surrendered, leaving Hideyoshi to return his attention to the Hōjō clan of the Kantō, the last major clan to oppose him.

Hideyoshi would make use of Kyūshū through much of the 1590s in his attacks on Korea.

== Battles of the Kyūshū campaign ==
=== 1586 ===
- Siege of Tachibana - Shimazu marched to attack Tachibana castle, when the commanders of the Shimazu army arrived near Tachibana castle. Tachibana Muneshige led the defense of the castle with his wife, the former clan leader Tachibana Ginchiyo.
- Siege of Oka Castle - Shiga Chikatsugu remained steadfast in defending the castle against the Shimazu clan forces led by his brother Shiga Chikanori.
- Siege of Tsurusaki castle - Myorin defended Tsurusaki castle and stopped Shimazu advance. Later Myorin launched a surprise attack around the Otozu River, defeating Shigemasa Shirahama and Hisabu, two high ranking Shimazu generals.
- Siege of Hiju castle - Hoashi Akinao and his wife Oni Gozen launched a pincer attack against Shimazu commander Ijūin Tadamune.
- Siege of Toshimitsu - the Shimazu seize Toshimitsu and Funai Castles from the Ōtomo, despite delaying tactics from Hideyoshi's allies.

=== 1587 ===
- Battle of Hetsugigawa - Shikoku's warlords with Ōtomo forces, continue to battle and delay the Shimazu, but ultimately retreat, leaving Bungo province to the Shimazu.
- Battle of Takajō (also called Takashiro) - Toyotomi Hidenaga attacks the Shimazu in Hyūga province, forcing them to retreat to Satsuma.
- Siege of Ganjaku - Toyotomi Hideyoshi attacks the Akizuki clan, Chikuzen province in the north of Kyūshū.
- Siege of Akizuki - Hideyoshi continues his assault on the Akizuki by besieged Oguma castle; the Akizuki clan surrender.
- Battle of Sendaigawa (also called Chidorigawa) - Hideyoshi and Hidenaga join forces and begin their attack on Satsuma province.
- Siege of Kagoshima - Hideyoshi and Hidenaga surround the Shimazu capital, and earn a surrender without laying siege to the castle.

== See also ==
- Oni Gozen
- Shigashi
- Munakata Saikaku
- Aso Koremitsu
- Okyō no Kata
- Konishi Yukinaga
