= Chōsokabe Nobuchika =

Japanese Samurai

- 長宗我部信親
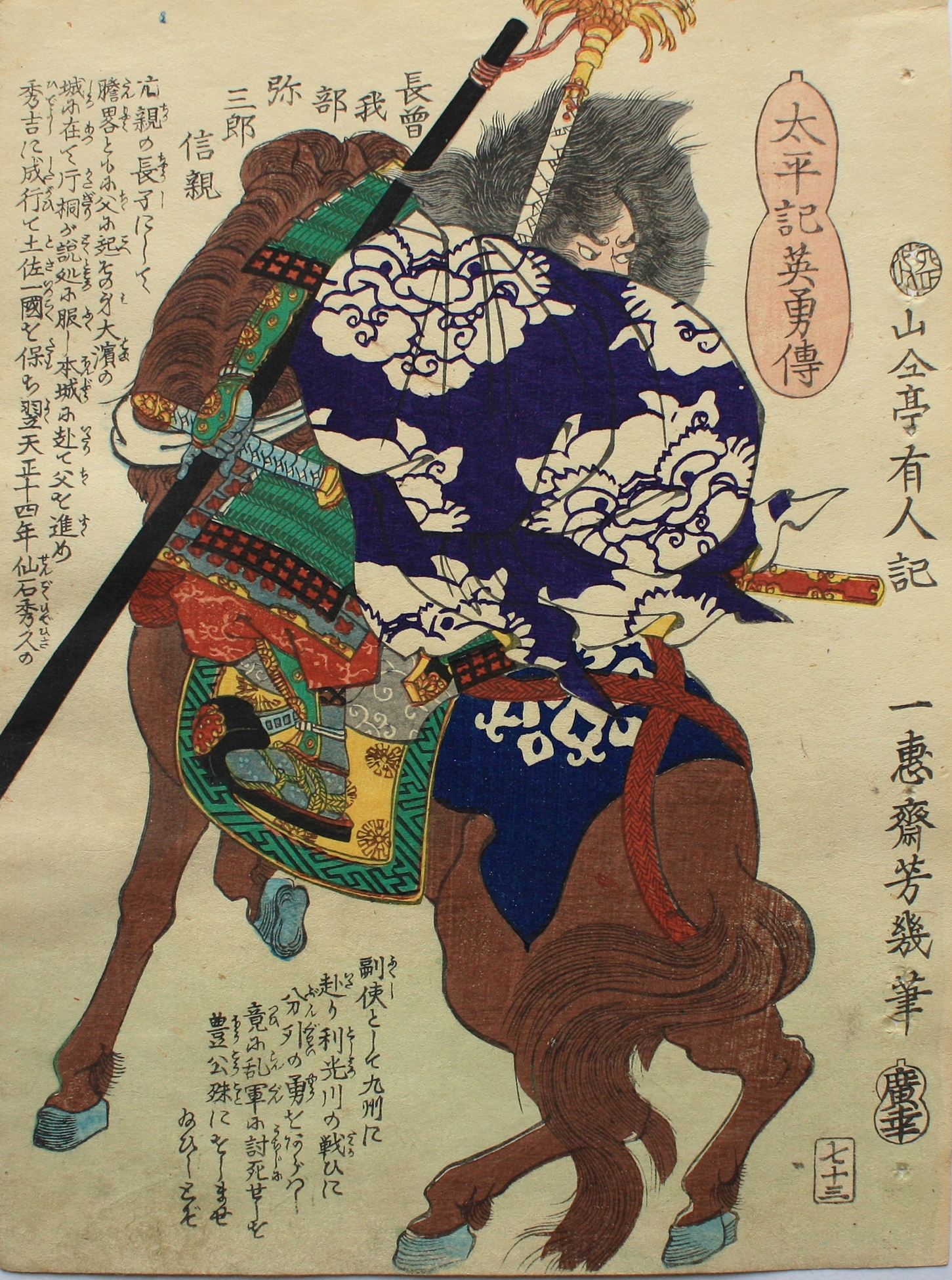
- Portrait of Chōsokabe Nobuchika from Utagawa Yoshiiku's Heroes of the Taiheiki
- Born: 1565; Tosa Province
- Died: January 1, 1587 (aged 21–22); Battle of Hetsugigawa
- Relatives: Chōsokabe Motochika (father); Kōsokabe Chikayasu (uncle)
- Military career
- Allegiance: Chōsokabe clan Toyotomi clan
- Conflicts: Invasion of Shikoku (1585); Battle of Hetsugigawa (1587)

Chōsokabe Nobuchika (長宗我部信親; 1565 – January 1, 1587) was the eldest son of samurai lord Chōsokabe Motochika, and lived during the late Sengoku period of Japanese history.

After the subjugation of Shikoku by Toyotomi Hideyoshi, Nobuchika and his father followed the Toyotomi into Kyushu Campaign. He died during the campaign against the Shimazu clan by Sengoku Hidehisa`s reckless operation in 1587. Nobuchika was caught in an ambush during the campaign against the Shimazu in Battle of Hetsugigawa.

== Family ==
- Great-Grandfather: Chōsokabe Kanetsugu (died 1508)
- Grandfather: Chōsokabe Kunichika (1504–1560)
- Father: Chōsokabe Motochika (1539–1599)
- Child: daughter married Chōsokabe Morichika
- Brothers:
  - Kagawa Chikakazu (1567-1587)
  - Chōsokabe Chikatada (1572–1600)
  - Chōsokabe Morichika (1575–1615)
