= Hidehisa =

- Gender: Male

Origin
- Origin: Japanese
- Meaning: Different meanings depending on the kanji used

Hidehisa (written: 秀久) is a masculine Japanese given name. Notable people with the name include:

- Hidehisa Otsuji (尾辻 秀久; born 1940), Japanese politician
- Sengoku Hidehisa (仙石 秀久; 1552−1614), Japanese samurai
