= Zentsūji, Kagawa (town) =

Dissolved municipality in Kagawa prefecture, Japan

1. Zentsūji (善通寺町, Zentsūji-chō) is an area within the city of Zentsūji, Kagawa Prefecture.
2. Zentsūji (善通寺町, Zentsūji-chō) was a town located within Nakatado District, Kagawa Prefecture. This article only contains the data until the day before the formation of the city of Zentsuji (March 31, 1954).

Zentsūji (善通寺町, Zentsūji-chō) was a town located in Nakatado District, Kagawa Prefecture.

== History ==
- November 3, 1901 - The villages of Zentsūji, Yoshida, and Amino merged to become the town of Zentsūji.
