= Akohime =

- 阿古姫

Personal life
- Parent(s): Chōsokabe Motochika; Lady Motochika (Lady Nana)
- Occupation: Retainer of samurai clan

Military service
- Unit: Chōsokabe clan

Akohime (阿古姫) was a Japanese noble woman from the Chōsokabe clan during the Sengoku period to the early Edo period. She was the daughter of Chōsokabe Motochika, the daimyō of Tosa Province in Shikoku. She was the last notable survivor of the clan after the Siege of Osaka; being responsible for continuing the Chōsokabe's lineage in Sendai domain when she became retainer of Date Masamune.

== Biography ==
Akohime was the daughter of Chōsokabe Motochika, known for having unified the island of Shikoku. She was also the sister of Chōsokabe Morichika and wife of Satake Chikanao, a retainer of the Chōsokabe, and bore two sons which would later be known as Igarashi Motonari e Shibata Tomomoto.

In 1615, during the Summer Campaign of the Siege of Ōsaka, Akohime accompanied the Chōsokabe army who were allies of the Toyotomi clan in the fight against the Tokugawa clan. Akohime, Chikanao and Chōsokabe Morichika enter Ōsaka Castle, but the Toyotomi lost the battle while Chikanao was killed in action. When Ōsaka Castle fell, Akohime and her two sons were captured by soldiers under the command of Date Masamune, the head of the Sendai domain. Masamune spared the lives of Akohime and her sons, after which Akohime served as a personal maid of the Date family under the name of Chūjō.

== Chōsokabe influence in Sendai ==
The lands of the Chōsokabe clan had been confiscated after the end of the Siege of Osaka, but Akohime who was spared from death used her influence to continue the Chosokabe lineage. Akohime was well-educated and articulate, so she was trusted by Masamune and served him into his later years.

Because of Akohime's efforts, each of her sons was adopted by a senior vassal and both became successors to their respective adoptive parents. Her sons also became servants of the family. Later, her second son, Motomaru, succeeded a senior retainer named Shiho Shibata and adopted the name of Shibata Tomomoto. For that reason, there were people related to Chosokabe who went to Sendai with the help of Akohime and her children.

Tomomoto worked as a magistrate. In 1671, during the Date Disturbance, he died in a sword fight against Harada Munesuke at the residence of Sakai Tadakiyo.

While serving as a personal maid to Masamune, Akohime requested of her cultured lord a work of calligraphy for which he wrote a song from Kiyohara no Motosuke, a revered noble and poet from the tenth century in the Heian period.

== Sources ==
- 佐藤憲一『素顔の伊達政宗 「筆まめ」戦国大名の生き様』（洋泉社、2012年）
- 明田鉄男 編『幕末維新全殉難者名鑑1』新人物往来社、1986年。ISBN 4404013353。
