= Shigashi =

Japanese noble

Shigashi 志賀氏

Personal details
- Died: 1587
- Spouse: Bekki Shigetsura

Military service
- Allegiance: Ōtomo clan Bekki clan
- Unit: Shiga clan
- Battles/wars: Kyūshū Campaign

Shigashi (志賀氏) (-d.1587) was a legendary Japanese noble lady and Japanese warrior from the Sengoku period. Shigashi means the lady from Shiga clan and her real name is unknown. She was the wife of Bekki Shigetsura (戸次鎮連) the retainer of Ōtomo clan, the nephew and the son-in-law of famed samurai Bekki Akitsura a.k.a. Tachibana Dōsetsu. She is best known for her role during conflicts between the Shimazu clan and the Ōtomo clan in Kyushu.

== Biography ==
Shigashi is documented in Tsuruga-jo Senshi (鶴賀城戦史; Military history of Tsuruga Castle) by Satō Kuratarō(佐藤蔵太郎) in 1927 based on various documents and stories about Tsuruga Castle including Gunki monogatari. Satō selected episodes that he considered historically correct and described the list of documents he cited but did not provide detailed source of quotation of each part. Shigashi was the daughter of the Ōtomo retainer Shiga Chikamori(志賀親守). Her husband, Shigetsura was the Bekki clan head after his father-in-low Bekki Akitsura once retired. Later, Akitsura inherited the headship of Tachibana clan as Tachibana Dōsetsu. Shigashi was the sister of Shiga Chikatsugu, a retainer of the Otomo clan.

When the army of Shimazu clan approached Ōtomo land during the Kyushu campaign, Shigetsura and some retainers betrayed Ōtomo clan and draw the enemy into their castles. Ōtomo clan ran into difficulty because the enemy's base suddenly appeared in own land.

Unlike her husband, Shigashi and her son, Bekki Munetsune(戸次統常) was still loyal to Ōtomo clan. Shigashi was said to be skilled military commander and dispatched troops to the betrayed retainer's castles and defeated them. One night, she encouraged her son to clear Bekki's name with defeating Shimazu army. She has another two young siblings sleeping by the side of her. She stabbed them to death with her short katana, because she had a fear that Munetsune will worry about his family during the battle. Then she suddenly departed for the Shimazu base. After killing many soldiers, she fired the castle and committed suicide.

Touched by his mother's bravely, Munetsune fought valiantly and killed by Shimazu defending Tsuruga Castle (鶴賀城) during the Battle of Hetsugigawa at the age 22.

== See also ==
- Myorin
- Oni Gozen

== Sources ==
- 鶴谷 佐藤蔵太郎 (1927). 鶴賀城戦史 (in Japanese).
