= Oni Gozen =

Japanese Sengoku period noblewoman

Oni Gozen 鬼御前

Personal details
- Spouse: Hoashi Akinao
- Children: at least one daughter (wife of Mōri Gorozaemon)

Military service
- Allegiance: Ōtomo clan
- Unit: Hoashi clan
- Battles/wars: Kyūshū Campaign

Oni Gozen (鬼御前) (fl. 16th century) was a Japanese noble lady and onna-musha from the Sengoku period. She was the wife of Hoashi Akinao (帆足鑑直) the retainer of Ōtomo clan. She is documented on "Yama no Shiro Kassen no Ki"(山の城合戦之記), written in 1782, 200 years after the time she lived by 帆足正周. She was a military commander who actively participated in the Kyushu campaign of 1586–1587, helping to repel the Shimazu army from the Ōtomo clan.

She was nicknamed Oni (Ogre or Demon) because she proved to be a fierce and brave warrior. She received the honorific suffix ''Gozen'', a Japanese term; that means "young lady" or ''honorable''.

== Biography ==
She was born Aiko No kyōki , the daughter of Kogo Settu no Kami (古後摂津守).. There are no details about her early life. She entered a political marriage with Hoashi Akinao, a samurai warlord, and became a retainer of Otomo Sorin, the leader of the Otomo clan. Following the wedding, she gave birth to a daughter, who later married Mori Gorōzaemon (森五郎左衛門).

According to "Yama no Shiro Kassen no Ki"(山の城合戦之記), written in 1782 by the descendant of the Hoashi clan, Oni Gozen was a beautiful and dignified woman. Her height was about 175 cm, very tall for someone at that time. She was not only a skillful martial artist, but also a military commander.

She attacked enemy's camp like the lion hunting a flock of sheep. She defended the castle like the mizuchi burrowing in an abyss.

The people of the neighboring province called her Oni Gozen, e.g. "Lady Demon", because of her bravery.

When the army of the Shimazu clan approached Ōtomo land in 1586 during the Kyushu campaign, Oni Gozen pledged herself with a seal of blood on a written oath at the Kumano shrine to die in battle rather than commit seppuku. Many men and women, including the wives and daughters of retainers, also took this oath. Her daughter was the wife of Mori Gorōzaemon (森五郎左衛門), who was besieged in Tsunomure Castle (角埋城). Oni Gozen sent a letter to her daughter and ordered her not to commit suicide but fight her enemies. Akinao was in command of Hijū Castle (日出生城), with about 500 men, which was attacked by the Shimazu general Ijūin Tadamune (伊集院忠棟) with over 6,000 men. Akinao let Oni Gozen and the small garrison defend the castle and led almost all his remaining men to attack the Ijūin base in a pincer attack. This surprise attack put the enemy to rout and left Tadamune heavily injured. This battle was one of the last battles between Ōtomo and Shimazu before the main army of Toyotomi Hideyoshi came to Kyūshū to relieve Ōtomo and subdue Shimazu.

== See also ==
- Munakata Saikaku
- Myorin
- Onna-musha
- Shigashi

== Sources ==
- 垣本言雄. 大分県郷土史料集成: 戦記篇. 下巻 (in Japanese). p. 七六一から七六三.
