= Hiketa Castle =

Castle ruins in Kagawa, Japan

- 引田城
- Hiketa, Kagawa Prefecture, Japan
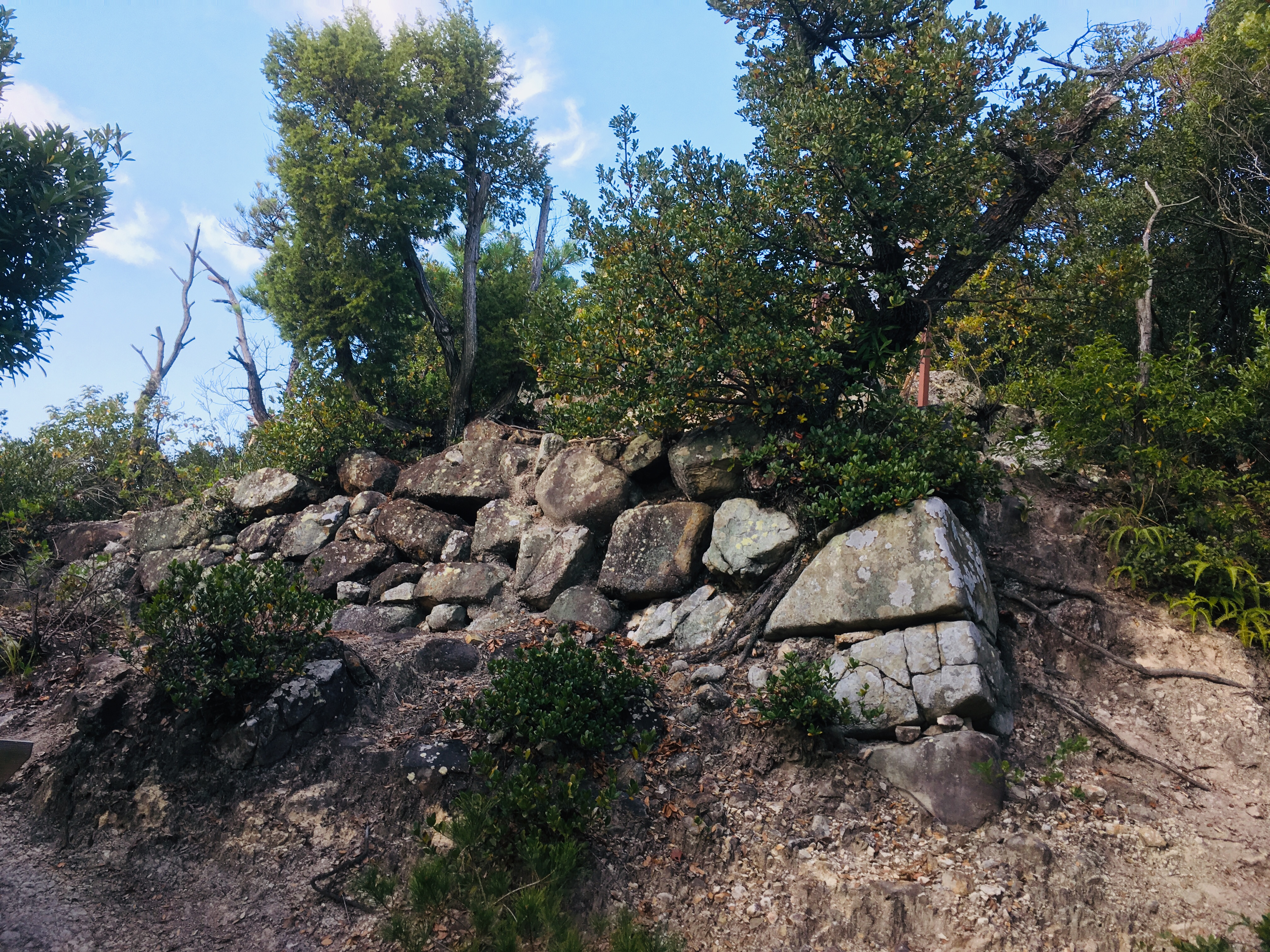
- Stone wall of Hiketa Castle

Site information
- Type: Hirayama style castle
- Owner: Miyoshi clan
- Condition: ruins

Location
- Hiketa Castle Hiketa Castle (Japan)
- Coordinates: 34°14′01″N 134°24′30″E

Site history
- Built: Sengoku period
- Built by: Unknown
- Materials: Stone walls
- Demolished: 1615
- Events: Battle of Hiketa

Garrison information
- Past commanders: Sengoku Hidehisa, Ikoma Chikamasa

Hiketa Castle (引田城, Hiketa-jō) was a Sengoku period Japanese castle located in what is now part of the city of Higashikagawa, Kagawa Prefecture, Japan. Its ruins have been protected by the central government as a National Historic Site since 2020.

== History ==
Hiketa Castle is located north of Hiketa port in eastern entrance of Sanuki Province. The area develop from the Heian period as one of the main ports connecting Shikoku with the Kinai region of Japan. It is unknown when a fortification was first built at this location, but by the early Sengoku period, the area was held by the Samukawa clan, vassals of the Miyoshi clan. However, by the 1570s, the Miyoshi were defeated by Chōsokabe Motochika, a minor warlord from Tosa Province who succeeded in uniting most of Shikoku under his rule. Concerned with the growing power of the Chōsokabe clan, Toyotomi Hideyoshi invaded Shikoku in the 1580s. The first step in the invasion was to send Sengoku Hisahide, commander of Sumoto Castle on Awaji Island to Sanuki Province to seize the harbor and Hiketa Castle as a bridgehead in 1583. Chōsakabe Motochika counterattacked the following year, and vastly outnumbering the Sengoku forces, were able to drive them back to Awaji. However, in the spring of 1585, Toyotomi Hideyoshi returned with a much larger invasion force and forced the Chōsokabe into submission. Sanuki Province was then assigned to Hideyoshi's general Ikoma Chikamasa, who initially made Hiketa Castle his stronghold. As Hiketa is located in far eastern Sanuki, he soon found the location to be inconvenient for governing the whole province, and in 1587 relocated his stronghold to the more central Takamatsu Castle. The Ikoma clan retained Hiketa Castle as a secondary stronghold to guard their eastern flank, whereas the new Marugame Castle served the same purpose for western Sanuki. Following the establishment of the Tokugawa shogunate, the government issued a decree in 1615 limiting the number of castles permitted by each domain to only one. As a result, Hiketa Castle was abandoned.

The castle once consisted of several enclosures spread across the ridge of the Shiroyama hill overlooking Hiketa port for a distance of 400 meters. The Nishi-no-kuruwa enclosure was the inner bailey and was protected by stone walls and perhaps three wooden yagura watchtowers. Stone walls also protected the north and west sides of the castle which faced the port and town. No structures remain of the castle, and only small portions of the stone walls have survived.

The castle site is a 30 minute walk from Hiketa Station on the JR Shikoku Kōtoku Line.

The castle was listed as one of the Continued Top 100 Japanese Castles in 2017.

== See also ==
- List of Historic Sites of Japan (Kagawa)

== Literature ==
- De Lange, William (2021). An Encyclopedia of Japanese Castles. Groningen: Toyo Press. pp. 600 pages. ISBN 978-9492722300.
- Schmorleitz, Morton S. (1974). Castles in Japan. Tokyo: Charles E. Tuttle Co. pp. 144–145. ISBN 0-8048-1102-4.
- Motoo, Hinago (1986). Japanese Castles. Tokyo: Kodansha. p. 200 pages. ISBN 0-87011-766-1.
