= Chōsokabe Chikatada =

Japanese Samurai

Chōsokabe Chikatada (長宗我部 親忠; 1572–1600) was a Japanese samurai of the Azuchi–Momoyama period. He was the third son of Chōsokabe Motochika, the lord of Tosa Province. He became the adopted son of Tsuno Katsuoki, taking the name Tsuno Chikatada (津野 親忠).

In 1600, Chikatada executed by order of his younger brother Chōsokabe Morichika, who had questioned his right to be Motochika's heir, as ruler of Tosa Province.

== Family ==
- Great-grandfather: Chōsokabe Kanetsugu (died 1508)
- Grandfather: Chōsokabe Kunichika (1504–1560)
- Father: Chōsokabe Motochika (1539–1599)
- Brothers:
  - Chōsokabe Nobuchika (1565–1587)
  - Chōsokabe Morichika (1575–1615)
  - Kagawa Chikakazu (1567–1587)

=== See also ===
- List of Google.jp books
- Samuri Archive article
