= Siege of Ganjaku =

1587 siege in Japan

Coordinates: 33.5775°N 130.87167°E

- Part of Toyotomi Hideyoshi's Kyūshū Campaign
Date	1587
Location	Ganjaku castle, Chikuzen province, Japan
Result	Siege succeeds; Toyotomi victory
Territorial changes	Castle falls to Hideyoshi

Belligerents
Forces of Toyotomi Hideyoshi	Akizuki clan garrrison

Commanders and leaders
Toyotomi Hideyoshi; Gamō Ujisato	A retainer of Akizuki Tanezane

The 1587 siege of Ganjaku was part of Toyotomi Hideyoshi's campaign to seize Kyūshū during Japan's Sengoku period.

== Background ==
While his half-brother attacked Taka castle on the island's east coast, Hideyoshi made his own initial landfall on the island's north coast, in Chikuzen province, and made his way towards Ganjaku castle, held by a retainer of Akizuki Tanezane.

== Siege ==
Hideyoshi intended to devote only a small party to the siege of the castle, while the rest of his army continued further. However, it is said that none of his generals wished to be left behind to head this siege, and so lots were drawn and Gamō Ujisato ended up commanding the siege party. It is said that Hideyoshi sat and watched from a nearby hill, granting gold coins to samurai for each enemy head they brought him.
