= Amagiri Castle =

Castle in Kagawa Prefecture, Japan

- 天霧城
- Kagawa Prefecture, Japan
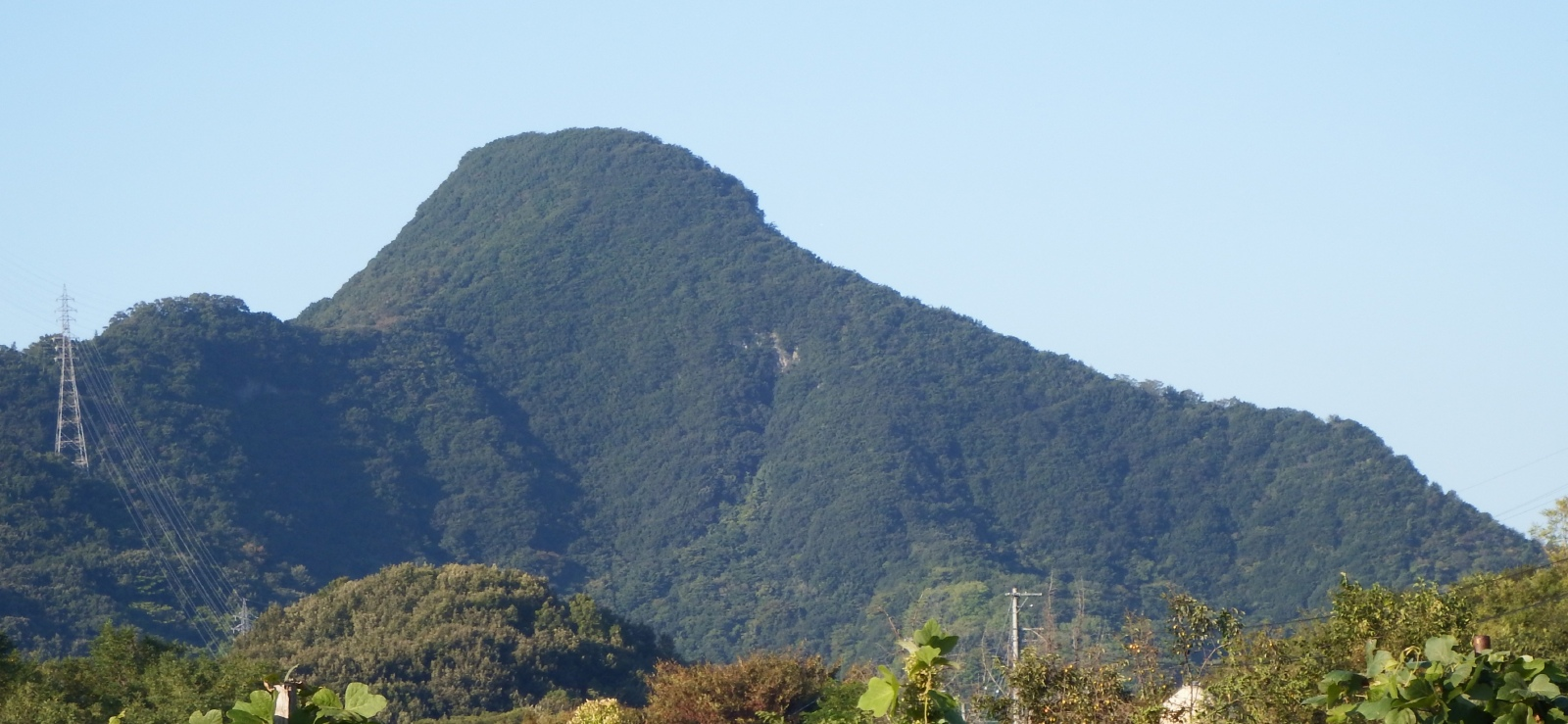
- Mount Amagiri

Site information
- Type: Mountaintop castle
- Controlled by: Kagawa clan Chōsokabe clan
- Condition: Ruins

Location
- Amagiri Castle Amagiri Castle (Japan)
- Coordinates: 34°14′8.22″N 133°44′7.47″E

Site history
- Built: 1364
- Built by: Kagawa Kagenori
- In use: Muromachi - Sengoku period
- Demolished: 1585

Garrison information
- Past commanders: Kagawa Yukikage, Kagawa Chikakazu
- National Historic Site of Japan

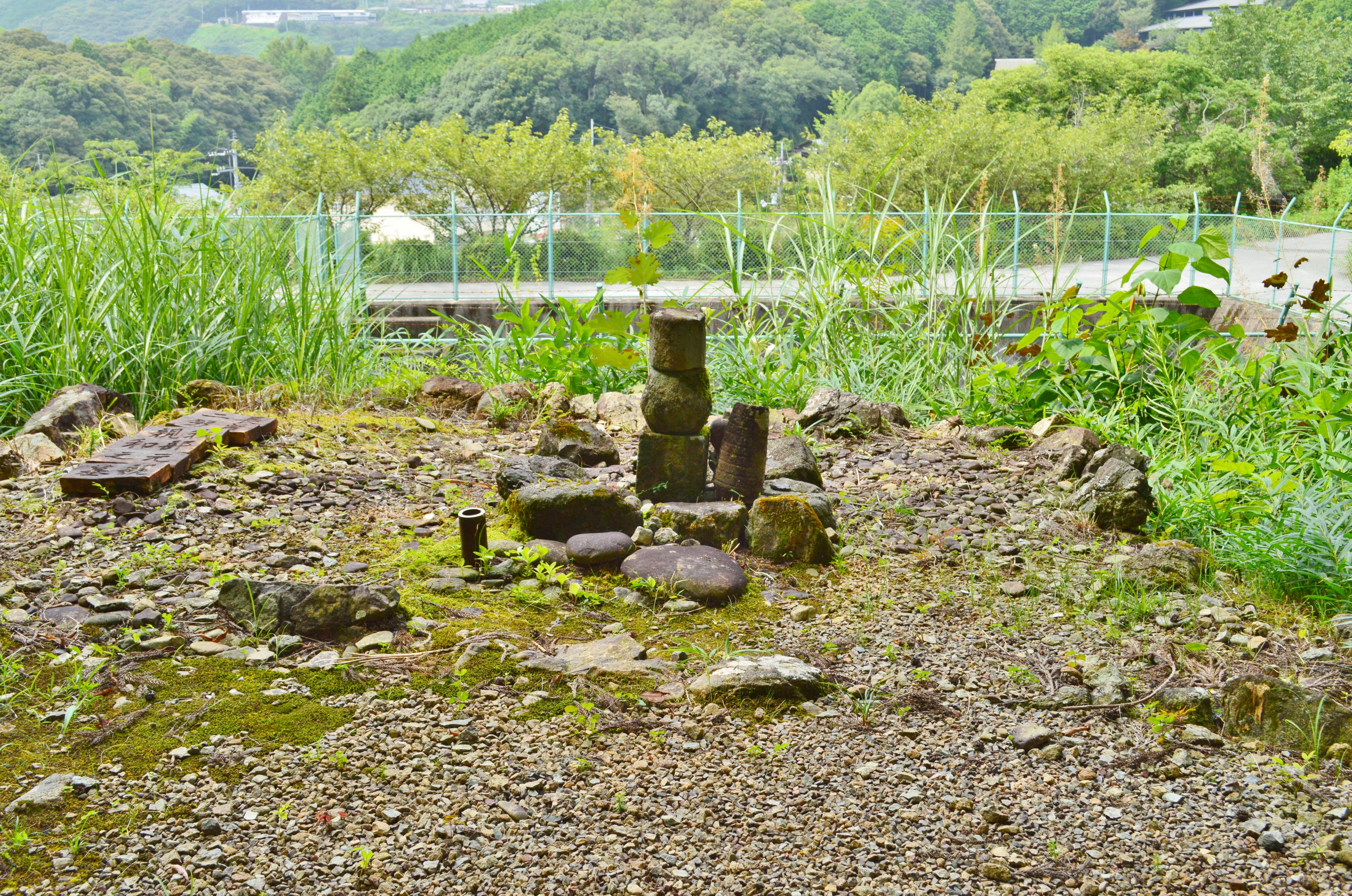
Tomb of Kagawa Chikakazu near the Okō Castle

Amagiri Castle (天霧城, Amagiri-jō) was a Muromachi period Japanese castle located on the border of what is now the cities of Zentsūji and Mitoyo and the town of Tadotsu, Kagawa Prefecture, Japan. Its ruins have been protected as a National Historic Site since 1990.

== History ==
Amagiri Castle is situated on Mount Amagiri (350 meters), which is located about five kilometers west of the city center of modern Marugame. Mount Amagiri is one of a line of mountains which separates the western half of Sanuki Province into the Marugame area and the Kannonji area. The mountain is near the coast, and controls the approach to the Utazu area, which was an important port on the Seto Inland Sea during the Muromachi period. Mount Amagiri is also twin mountain along with Mount Iyadani, which is approximately the same elevation. Mount Iyadani is the location of Iyadani-ji, the 71st of the 88 Shikoku Pilgrimage temples, and worshipped as a sacred mountain and training location for Kūkai.

Mount Amagiri was fortified by the Kagawa clan in the 15th century. The Kagawa were originally from Sagami Province and were retainers of the Hosokawa clan. As the Hosokawa clan gained power and prominence under the Muromachi shogunate, the Kagawa accompanied the Hosokawa campaign to conquer Shikoku from supporters of the Southern Court. Afterwards, the Kagawa were promoted to the position of deputy shugo with control of western Sanuki Province and established their seat at Tadotsu Castle ( Motodaiyama Castle) in Tadotsu as a residence; it was considered unsuitable to withstanding a siege, thus Amagiri Castle was built in 1364 by Kagawa Kagenori as a supporting fortification for Tadotsu Castle.

As was common with mountain castles of the period, Amagiri Castle occupied a long and narrow ridge of the mountain. The central area was at the peak. and was surrounded by enclosures built toward north for over 200 meters. Each enclosure utilized the natural terrain, and were fortified with stone walls. The main gate was to the south, which was also the approach from Iyadani-ji temple. North of the core area, enclosures continued along the northward and two eastward ridges. The total length of the castle extended for over 800 meters.

In the early Sengoku period, the Hosokawa clan suffered from internal conflicts and saw much of its power and influence eclipsed by the Miyoshi clan, who were originally from Awa Province. Eastern Sanuki, due to its proximity to Awa fell quickly under Miyoshi control, but the Kagawa clan resisted for a time at Amagiri Castle before finally submitting to Miyoshi Jikkyu (1527-1562). However, around 1570, as Oda Nobunaga came int conflict with the Miyoshi, the Kagawa again asserted their independence broke with Miyoshi Nagaharu. Their independence was short-lived, as the entire area was conquered by Chōsokabe Motochika, a warlord from Tosa Province in 1577. In 1581, Kagawa Yukikage accepted Chōsokabe Motochika's second son Chikakazu, thus the castle was used as a military base for Chōsokabe clan in Sanuki Province. The Chōsokabe were in turn defeated by Toyotomi Hideyoshi in 1585. During Hideyoshi's conquest of Shikoku, the Kagawa clan were deprived of Amagiri Castle and exiled to Tosa Province. Amagiri Castle was abandoned.

At present, nothing remains of the castle except for some fragments of stone walls and evidence of rock quarrying near the peak. Ten site is about 20 minutes by car from Zentsuji Station on the JR Shikoku Dosan Line.

== See also ==
- List of Historic Sites of Japan (Kagawa)

== Literature ==
- De Lange, William (2021). An Encyclopedia of Japanese Castles. Groningen: Toyo Press. pp. 600 pages. ISBN 978-9492722300.
- Motoo, Hinago (1986). Japanese Castles. Tokyo: Kodansha. pp. 200 pages. ISBN 0-87011-766-1.
