= Siege of Hiketa =

16th-century Japanese siege

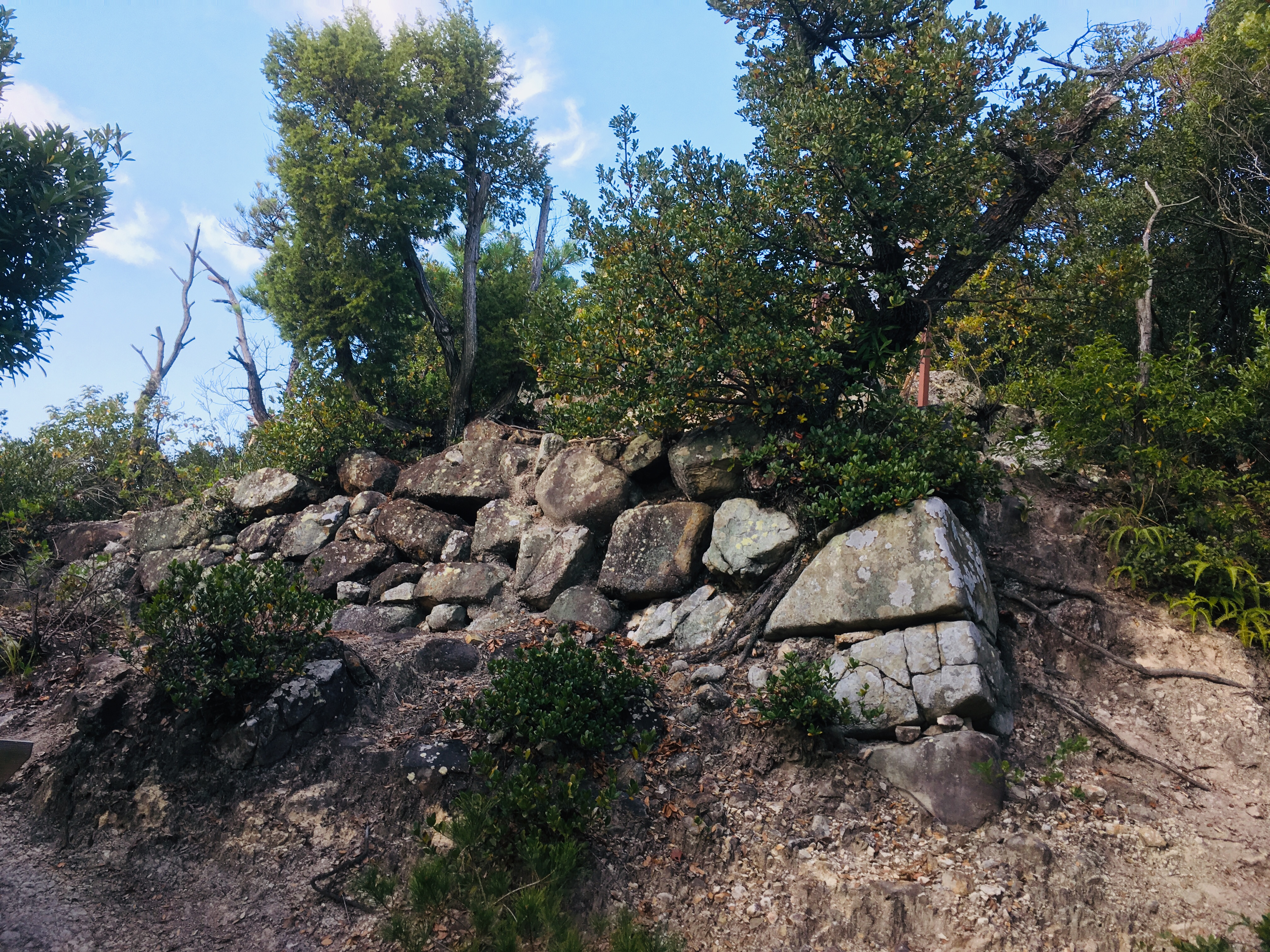
- Stone wall of Hiketa castle
Date	1583
Location	Hiketa, Sanuki Province, Shikoku 34°14′01″N 134°24′30″E
Result	Chōsokabe victory

Belligerents
Chōsokabe clan forces	Toyotomi clan forces

Commanders and leaders
Chōsokabe Motochika; Kōsokabe Chikayasu; Kagawa Yukikage	Sengoku Hidehisa
- Location within Kagawa Prefecture Siege of Hiketa (Japan)

The siege of Hiketa (引田の戦い) was a battle during the Azuchi–Momoyama period (16th century) of Japan. The siege of Hiketa Castle was a certain battle that was fought by Sengoku Hidehisa against Chōsokabe Motochika.

In the end however, Motochika won this victory. Hiketa was to be a further stage within the Chōsokabe's conquering of the Shikoku Island.
