= Shikoku Gakuin Junior College =

Junior college in Japan

Shikoku Gakuin Junior College (四国学院短期大学, Shikoku Gakuin Tanki Daigaku) was a junior college in Zentsūji, Kagawa, Japan, and was part of the Shikoku Gakuin network.

The institute was founded in 1950, became a junior college at 1959, and closed in March 2006.
