= Shiga Chikatsugu =

Shiga Chikatsugu (志賀 親次), Chikayoshi (親善) or Kozaemon no Jō (小左衛門尉), was a samurai who lived in Japan during the Sengoku period and the beginning of the Edo period. He was the son of Shiga Chikamori and the brother of Shigashi and Shiga Chikanori. He and his family served the Otomo clan, a major samurai clan who ruled a large part of the Bungo Province.

== Biography ==
Shiga Chikatsugu, also known by the names Chikayoshi and Kozaemon no Jō, was probably born in about 1566. He is, in his early days, in the service of Ōtomo Sōrin, a daimyō chief of a clan on the island of Kyūshū.

He later becomes the owner of Oka Castle, in the former province of Bungo. Chikatsugu was a samurai converted to Christianity by the name of Don Paulo. and he remained faithful to his religion even when Christianity was banned in Japan. Such an environment drew many Christians to this area and also brought Western culture to this place. In the city of Oka there was a cave church used even after the Catholic ban.

== Kyushu Campaign ==
Chikatsugu's brother Shiga Chikanori, who was the former leader of the Shiga clan, moved to Shimazu's side and participated as a guide when Shimazu Yoshihiro marched towards Higo Prefecture's Oka Castle in October 1585.

But Chikatsugu, the young leader of Shiga clan, decided to resist against overwhelming Shimazu army of 30,000 soldiers at Oka castle with his army of 2,000 soldiers. Although several branch castle fell before the attack of Shimazu army, Chikatsugu firmly kept Oka castle.

He distinguished himself in 1586, securing the defense of his castle, resisting invasion attempts by the Shimazu clan until the arrival of Toyotomi Hideyoshi's forces during his Kyushu campaign.
