= Battle of Takajō =

1587 battle in Japan

- Part of Toyotomi Hideyoshi's Kyūshū Campaign
Date	1587
Location	Takajō, Hyūga Province, Japan 32°10′04″N 131°28′21″E
Result	Toyotomi victory

Belligerents
Forces of Toyotomi Hideyoshi	Shimazu clan

Commanders and leaders
Hashiba Hidenaga; Miyabe Keijun; Tōdō Takatora	Shimazu Yoshihisa; Shimazu Yoshihiro; Shimazu Iehisa; Yamada Arinobu

Strength
90,000	20,000
- Location within Japan

The 1587 Battle of Takajō, also known as the Battle of Takashiro, was the first battle in Toyotomi Hideyoshi's campaigns to seize control of Kyūshū during Japan's Sengoku period.

== History ==
Hideyoshi's half-brother Hashiba Hidenaga led 90,000 men, landing near Takajō (Taka Castle). Within the previous several years, the Shimazu clan of Satsuma province had spread across the island, seizing the Ōtomo clan capital of Funai (Funai Castle). In doing so, they had become a significant power in the region, and threatened Hideyoshi's supremacy over Japan. Hidenaga's forces pursued the Shimazu beyond Takajō who garrisoned by Yamada Arinobu, and began to besiege the fortress. Shimazu Iehisa then turned his force of 20,000 around, clashing with a detachment of 15,000 Toyotomi warriors. Three thousand Shimazu warriors dismantled the fortifications of the besiegers, and distracted them long enough to effect a cavalry attack. However, they then found themselves flanked by 1500 Toyotomi warriors, who made every effort to give the appearance of a larger force in the Shimazus' rear, cutting off their escape. Fighting their way through the Toyotomi forces, the Shimazu effected a retreat, leaving Takajō and the surrounding area to Hidenaga.

== External link ==
- Shiroyama Park (Takajō Castle Ruins), Takajō River Battlefield, Nejirozaka Battlefield Site / Kijo Town
