= Aso Koremitsu =

- Born: 1582
- Died: 1593 (aged 10–11)

Aso Koremitsu (1582–1593) was a head of the Japanese clan of Aso during the Azuchi-Momoyama period (16th century) of Japan. Koremitsu was a child when his father died.

When Higo province was divided between Konishi Yukinaga and Katō Kiyomasa in 1587, on the completion of the Kyushu Campaign, Koremitsu sought sanctuary with the latter. However, Toyotomi Hideyoshi ordered Koremitsu to be killed in 1593 as part of Hideyoshi's policy of systematic elimination of other noble clans.
