= Sumoto Castle =

Japanese Muromachi-period castle

- 洲本城
- Sumoto, Hyōgo, Japan
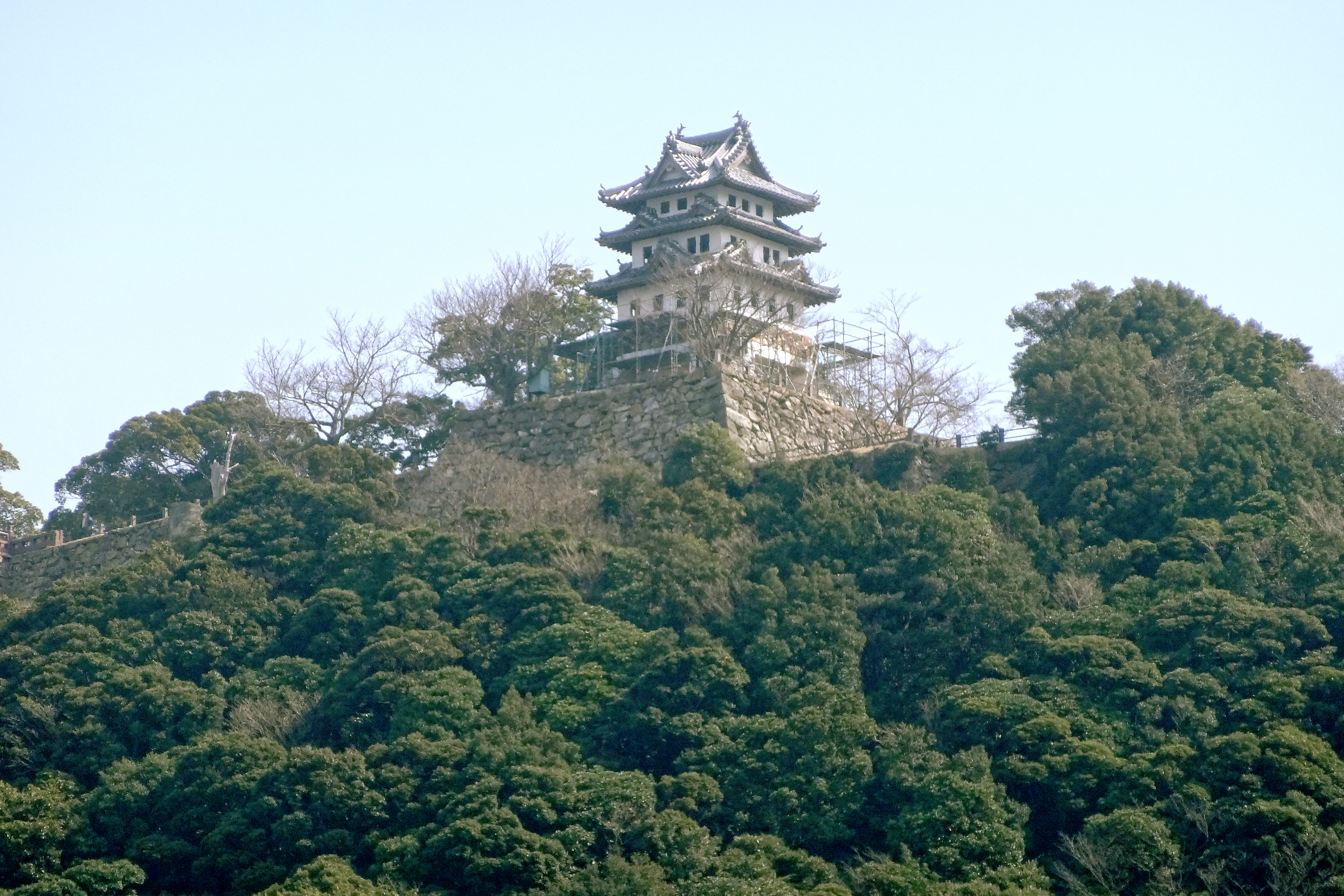
- Sumoto Castle mock donjon

Site information
- Type: Yamajiro-style Japanese castle
- Condition: ruins

Location
- Sumoto Castle
- Location within Hyōgo Prefecture Location within Japan
- Coordinates: 34°20′16″N 134°54′10″E

Site history
- Built: 1526
- National Historic Site of Japan

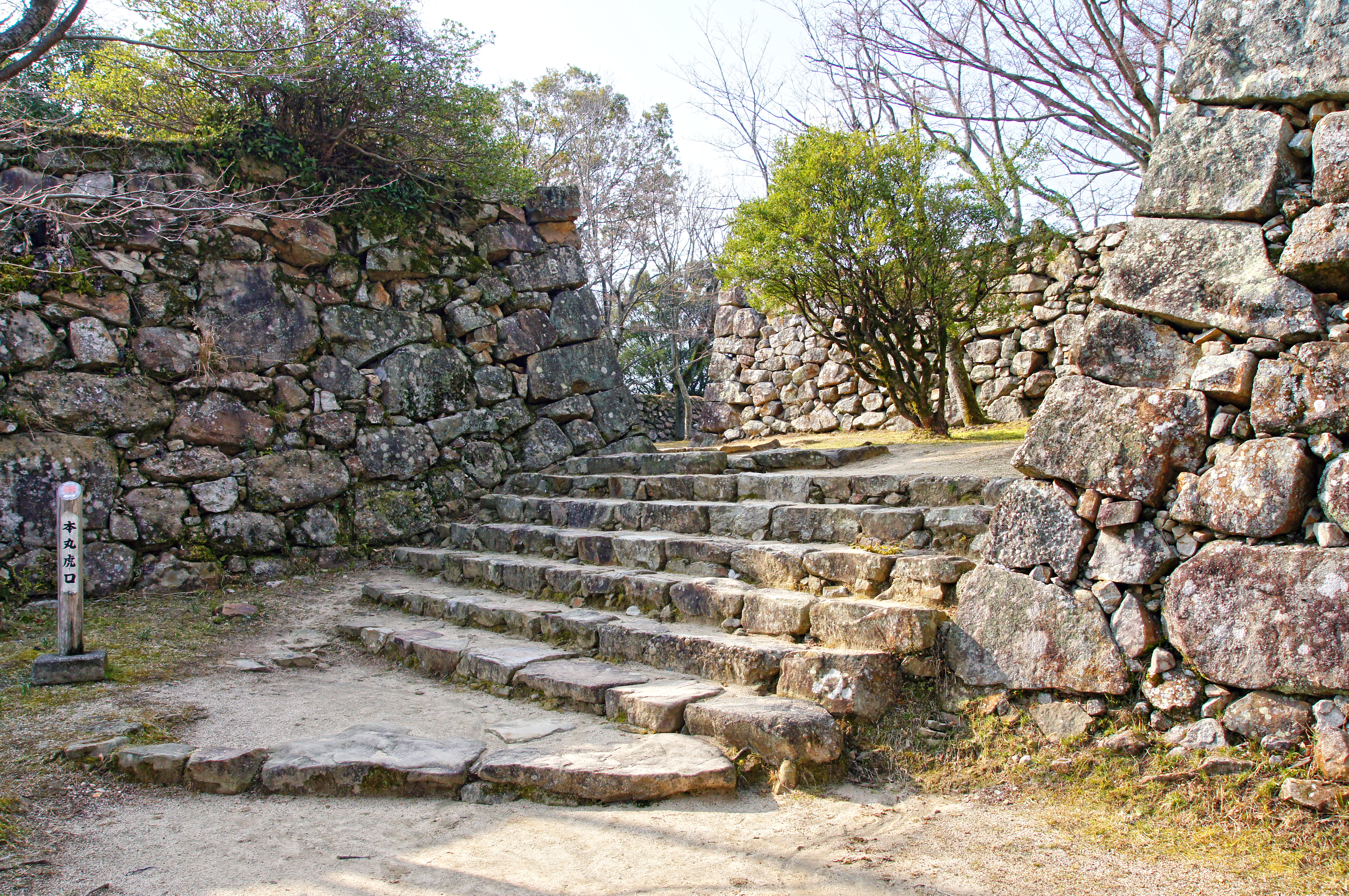
Surviving stone walls of Sumoto Castle

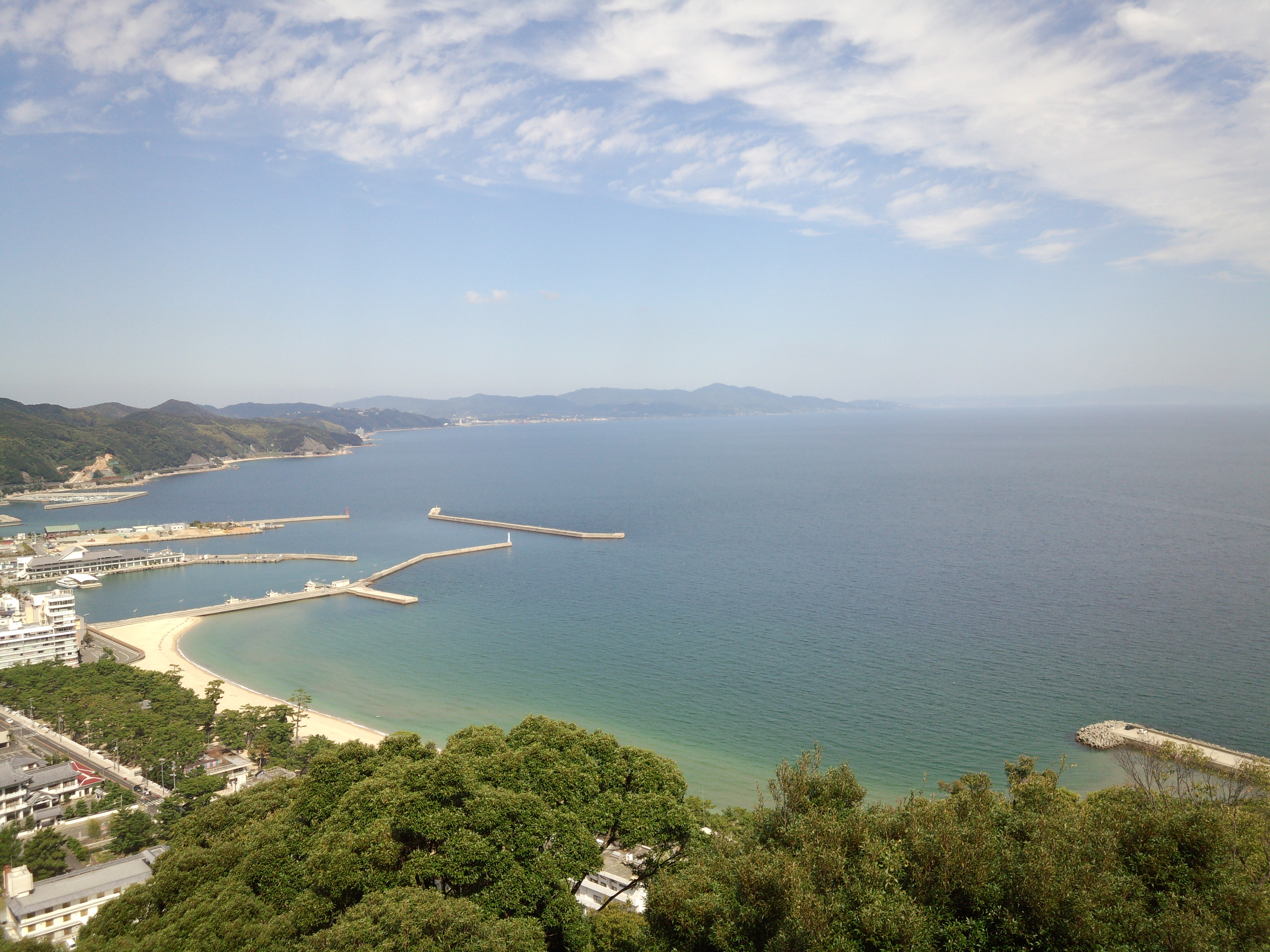
View from Sumoto Castle

Sumoto Castle (洲本城, Sumoto-jō) was a Muromachi to Sengoku period Japanese castle located in the Orodani neighborhood of the city of Sumoto, Hyōgo Prefecture, Japan. Its ruins have been protected as a National Historic Site since 1999. It was also referred to as Mikuma Castle (三熊城).

== Overview ==
Sumoto Castle is located on the southeast coast of Awaji Island on a long and narrow ridge of the 130-meter Mount Mikuma. Awaji Island has been a strategic transportation hub for the Kinai region since ancient times, forming part of the route between Honshu and Shikoku and controlling maritime transportation between the Pacific Ocean and the Seto Inland Sea and Osaka Bay. In the Sengoku period, the island was controlled by the Miyoshi clan, who ruled Sanuki, Awa and Kawachi Provinces. Sumoto Castle was constructed by their retainer, the Atagi clan, around 1526. The island was seized by Hashiba Hideyoshi in 1581 as part of Oda Nobunaga's conquest of western Japan, and assigned his general Sengoku Hidehisa to govern Sumoto. In 1583, Sengoku Hidehisa was officially named daimyō and he modernized the Sumoto fortifications, and used the castle as his residence. However, Hidehisa was defeated and disgraced in 1586 in a battle with the Shimazu clan in 1585 and was replaced a Sumoto by Wakizaka Yasuharu. With the support of Hideyoshi, Wakizaka Yasuharu expanded the castle to protect the seaward approaches to Osaka, the economic center of the Toyotomi government.

After the 1600 Battle of Sekigahara, Awaji came briefly under the control of the Ikeda clan of Himeji Domain. The Ikeda clan abolished Sumoto Castle and built Yura Castle in the northern region of Awaji Island, which was closer to their stronghold at Himeji Castle. But after the Battle of Osaka from 1614 to 1615, Awaji was awarded by the Tokugawa shogunate to the Hachisuka clan of Tokushima Domain, who appointed their retainers, the Inada clan, as governors of Awaji. As Sumoto was closer to Tokushima than Yura, the Inada rebuilt Sumoto Castle in the 1630s. Sumoto Castle was held by the Inada clan until the Meiji restoration of 1868. What remains of the castle today are extensive complex-shaped stone walls. In 1928 the tenshu was rebuilt in reinforced concrete in commemoration of the enthronement of Emperor Hirohito.

The upper castle was designated as a National Historic Site on January 14, 1999, and the lower castle was also designated as a historic site in Sumoto City. The Sumoto City Awaji Cultural History Museum, which displays materials related to the upper castle, is located on the site of the lower castle. Sumoto Castle was listed as one of the Continued Top 100 Japanese Castles in 2017.

== See also ==
- List of Historic Sites of Japan (Hyōgo)
- List of castles in Japan

== Literature ==
- De Lange, William (2021). An Encyclopedia of Japanese Castles. Groningen: Toyo Press. pp. 600 pages. ISBN 978-9492722300.
