= Chōsokabe Morichika =

Japanese Daimyo

- 長宗我部 盛親
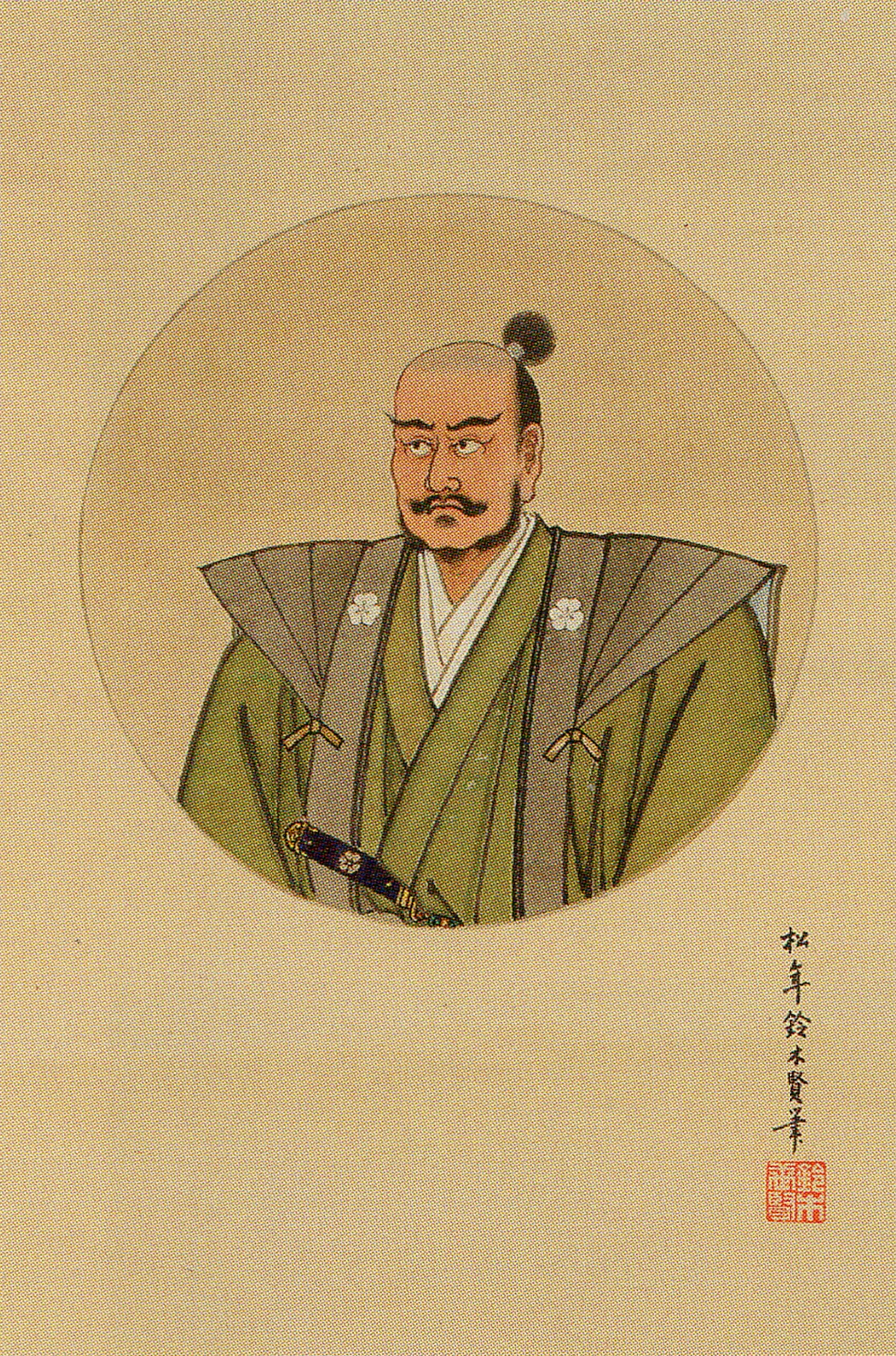

Head of Chōsokabe clan
- In office 1599–1615
- Preceded by: Chōsokabe Motochika

Personal details
- Born: Sen'yumaru; 1575 Shikoku
- Died: May 11, 1615 (aged 39–40) Osaka
- Parent: Chōsokabe Motochika (father)

Military service
- Allegiance: Chosokabe clan Toyotomi clan Western army
- Unit: Chosokabe clan
- Commands: Tosa province
- Battles/wars: Siege of Odawara; Korean Campaign; Battle of Sekigahara; Siege of Osaka; Battle of Tennōji

Chōsokabe Morichika (長宗我部 盛親; 1575 – May 11, 1615) was a Japanese samurai of the Azuchi–Momoyama period through early Edo period. Once the ruler of Tosa Province, his fief was revoked by Tokugawa Ieyasu after the Battle of Sekigahara. His childhood name was Senkumamaru (千熊丸).

== Biography ==
Morichika was the 4th son of Chōsokabe Motochika. He was named the heir to the Chōsokabe following Chōsokabe Nobuchika's death in 1587 and fought in the Siege of Odawara (1590) and 1st Korean Campaigns (1592-93).

In 1600, he sided with Ishida Mitsunari and commanded 6,600 men. His troops fought against Ikeda Terumasa at the Battle of Sekigahara (though he saw very little action) Due to communication failures, battlefield positioning, and the betrayal of neighboring armies, Morichika’s forces stood completely idle and saw almost no action before the Western Army collapsed. He was afterwards deprived of his fief despite sending an apology to Tokugawa Ieyasu. That same year, he had ordered the execution of his elder brother Tsuno Chikatada, who had questioned his right to be Motochika's heir, as ruler of Tosa Province.

In 1614, he went to join the defenders of Osaka Castle against the Tokugawa, he arriving there the same day as Sanada Yukimura. His Chōsokabe contingent fought very well in both the Winter and Summer Osaka Campaigns. After the fall of Osaka, Morichika attempted to flee but was apprehended at Hachiman-yama by Hachisuka men. He and his sons were beheaded on May 11, 1615, following the defeat of the Toyotomi and Chōsokabe forces at the Battle of Tennōji.

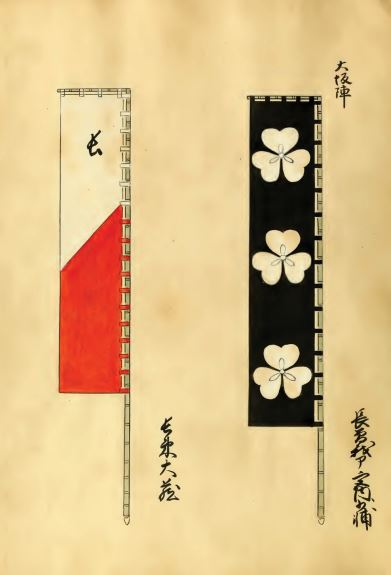
Chōsokabe Morichika hata-jirushi (right)

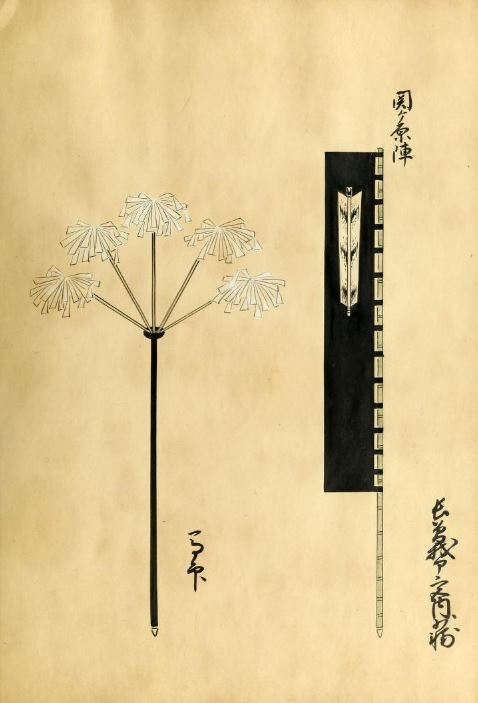
Chōsokabe Morichika hata-jirushi and uma-jirushi

== Family ==
- Father: Chōsokabe Motochika (1539–1599)
- Mother: Lady Motochika (d. 1583)
- Older brother :
  - Chōsokabe Nobuchika
  - Kagawa Chikakazu
- Wife: Daughter of Chōsokabe Nobuchika
- Children:
  - Chōsokabe Moritaka (d. 1615)
  - Chōsokabe Morisada (d. 1615)
  - Chōsokabe Morinobu (d. 1615)
  - Chōsokabe Moritsune (d. 1615)
- Grandchild: (son of Moritsune) Chōsokabe Moritane (d. 1615)
