= Sengoku Hidehisa =

Japanese warrior (1552–1614)

- 仙石 秀久
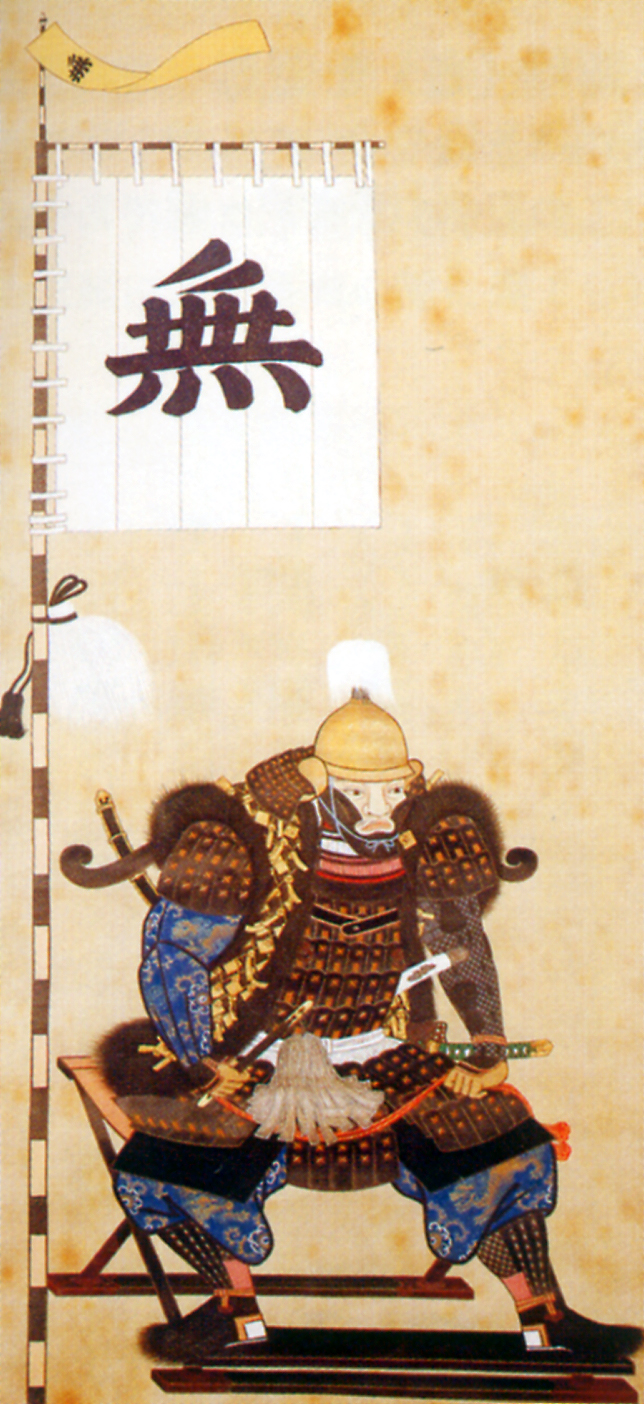

Lord of Komoro
- In office 1590–1612

Personal details
- Born: February 20, 1552 Mino Province, Japan
- Died: June 13, 1614 (aged 62) Shinano Province, Japan

Military service
- Allegiance: Saitō clan Oda clan Toyotomi clan Tokugawa clan Tokugawa shogunate
- Rank: Daimyō
- Commands: Hiketa Castle; Komoro Castle
- Battles/wars: Battle of Yamasaki (1582); Battle of Hiketa (1583); Invasion of Shikoku (1585); Battle of Hetsugigawa (1587); Siege of Odawara (1590); Siege of Ueda (1600)

Sengoku Hidehisa (仙石 秀久; February 20, 1552 − June 13, 1614), childhood name Gonbei (権兵衛) was a samurai warrior of the Sengoku period and the Edo period. He was the head of the Komoro Domain in Shinano Province. Hidehisa is also credited with being the man who captured the legendary outlaw hero "Ishikawa Goemon".

== Early life ==
According to his family records, Hidehisa was the fourth son of his family, a low ranking samurai family in the Saitō clan. He was adopted out to another family at a young age, but eventually his older brothers died of illness and he was recalled to inherit his family name. During Mino Campaign, his clan was destroyed by Oda Nobunaga and he was captured during the assault.

He then became a member of the Oda clan and was ordered to serve under Kinoshita Tōkichirō (the eventual Toyotomi Hideyoshi). Hidehisa took part in most of the Oda clan's military actions afterwards. Slowly but steadily he rose up through the ranks.

Hidehisa is generally described as a brave and skillful warrior in his early days with Nobunaga; he was often at the front lines of the Oda clan's military operations. He also appears to have inherited some of Hideyoshi's charisma, as he was able to avoid getting himself killed despite ending up several times in situations that would normally have boded poorly for most samurai.

== Service under Hideyoshi ==
In 1581, he was made the daimyō of Awaji Island at Sumoto Castle.

In 1583, he was defeated in the Battle of Hiketa against Chosokabe Motochika.

In 1585, he participated in Hideyoshi's successful campaign in Shikoku against Chosokabe clan.

In 1587, he was given charge to lead the campaign on Kyushu with two other daimyō: Chōsokabe Motochika and Sogō Masayasu. However, they were crushed in the Battle of Hetsugigawa by the Shimazu. Sogō Masayasu perished along with Chōsokabe Motochika's heir, Nobuchika. Hidehisa was accused of charging ahead too soon and then fleeing at the first sight of trouble. After he returned to Hideyoshi, he was stripped of his title, land, and sent into exile.

== Service under Ieyasu ==
In 1590, Tokugawa Ieyasu soon arranged for him to nominally join the Tokugawa clan, and he participated in the Odawara campaign, against the Hōjō clan, where his valor redeemed his name. Later, he was made daimyō at Komoro with 50,000 koku revenues. Due to this series of events, after Hideyoshi's death, Hidehisa easily sided with Ieyasu in the Sekigahara campaign.

In 1600, Hidehisa was in the army of Ieyasu's heir, Tokugawa Hidetada, they were unable to reach the Sekigahara main battle in time due to the stalling tactics of Sanada Masayuki at Siege of Ueda. However Hidehisa successfully persuaded the furious Ieyasu to spare both he and Hidetada after this blunder. Hidetada remained grateful to Hidehisa for the remainder of his life. Hidehisa's family remained daimyo until the Meiji Restoration.

== Popular culture ==
He is the main protagonist of the manga Sengoku, by Hideki Miyashita. The story starts when Oda Nobunaga attacks Saitō Tatsuoki's castle.

== See also ==
- Sengoku clan
