= Battle of Hetsugigawa =

1587 battle in Japan

- Part of Toyotomi Hideyoshi's Kyūshū Campaign
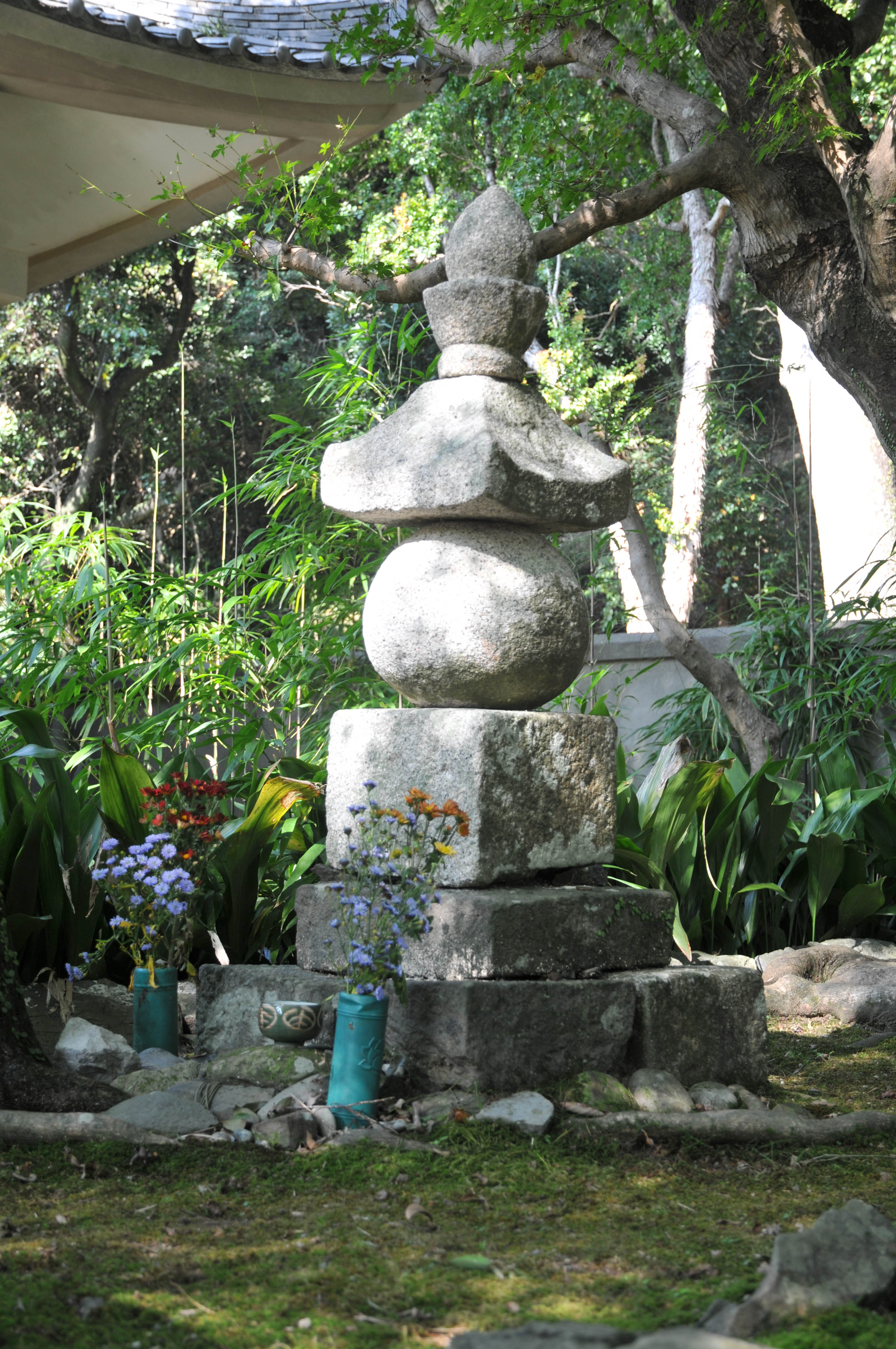
- Battle of Hetsugigawa
Date	January 20, 1587
Location	Hetsugigawa (present-day Ōnogawa), Kyūshū 33°08′20″N 131°39′30″E
Result	Shimazu victory

Belligerents
forces of Toyotomi Hideyoshi	forces of Shimazu clan

Commanders and leaders
Sengoku Hidehisa; Chōsokabe Motochika; Chōsokabe Nobuchika †; Sogō Masayasu †; Ōtomo Sōrin; Ōtomo Yoshimune; Bekki Munetsune †	Shimazu Iehisa; Shimazu Toyohisa; Niiro Tadamoto; Ijuin Hisanori

Strength
20,000	10,000 – 13,000

Casualties and losses
- Location within Oita Prefecture Battle of Hetsugigawa (Japan)

The Battle of Hetsugigawa (戸次川の戦い, Hetsugigawa no Tatakai) was the last battle before the Toyotomi main army's arrival on Kyūshū during Japan's Sengoku period.

In 1586 at Hetsugigawa (present Ōnogawa) in Bungo province Toyotomi's vanguard divisions under Chōsokabe Motochika and Sengoku Hidehisa landed on Kyūshū with orders to act defensively until further troops were able to join them. But the advance party decided to disobey Hideyoshi's commands and relieve the castle of Toshimitsu. The Shimazu besieging army noted their approach, and redoubled their efforts to take Toshimitsu castle, so that when the invaders arrived at the Hetsugi river, which flowed within sight of the castle, they could see the flags of Shimazu flying from its towers. Motochika proposed a withdrawal, but his companions, Yoshimune and Hidehisa, insisted on doing battle, so the Shimazu set their trap.

The decoy force led by Ijuin Hisanori attacked across the river and then withdrew, which persuaded the allied left wing to follow them. They were met by arquebus and arrow fire, and the main body of the Shimazu under Iehisa and Tadamoto, then fell upon them. After much fierce fighting the invading force withdrew across the river and caused confusion to its own right wing. Chōsokabe Motochika was obliged to signal a full retreat, during which his son Nobuchika and Sogō Masayasu were killed.

== Bekki's Last Stand ==
Among the Ōtomo forces who died in the battle was Bekki Munetsune (戸次統常; also romanized Totsugi Munetsune), a 22-year-old retainer and head of the Bekki/Totsugi family, who fought specifically to restore his family's honor after his father had been executed on suspicion of colluding with the Shimazu.

The battle takes its name from the Hetsugigawa (戸次川, "Hetsugi River"), the historical name for the lower course of the Ōno River, in an area still known today as Hetsugi, in Ōita. "Hetsugi" is itself one of several documented readings of the same 戸次 kanji used by the Bekki/Totsugi clan, which had taken its own name from this territory centuries earlier. The family's residences, relocated upriver after losing their original domain, stood along the same river system.

Before departing for battle, Munetsune reportedly burned his family's ancestral documents and heirlooms, and sent his heir and wife to separate castles for safety. Rather than retreating, Munetsune's forces reportedly engaged and repelled the numerically superior Shimazu forces in four or five successive clashes, before finally being overwhelmed. Munetsune and members of his clan died in the battle alongside Chōsokabe Nobuchika and Sogō Masayasu. A marker at the site of the battlefield in present-day Ōita commemorates his death and that of his clan. See also the Japanese Wikipedia article on the Bekki clan (戸次氏) for further genealogical detail.
