= Masuda Kageyoshi =

Japanese warlord

- 益田 景祥

Personal life
- Born: 1575 or 1577
- Died: 1630
- Military career
- Allegiance: Kobayakawa clan Mōri clan
- Units: Masuda clan, Munakata clan

Masuda Kageyoshi (益田景祥) also known as Masuda Saikaku (益田才鶴) and Munakata Saikaku (宗像才鶴) was a Japanese samurai warlord of the Sengoku period. He was the son of Masuda Motonaga, the retainer of Mōri clan. He was temporarily adopted into the Munakata clan daiguji of Munakata Shrine in Chikuzen province of the Kyushu island. After death of Munakata Ujisada, Munakata clan head in 1586, he was sent to Munakata clan as the successor by Mōri clan. However, he returned to Masuda clan after death of his brother, Hirokane in 1595. He became a vassal of Kobayakawa Takakage, and later Mōri Terumoto .

Toyotomi Hideyoshi, one of the Three Unifiers of Japan, sent letters to Munakata Saikaku of the Munakata clan, famed for producing successive generations of daiguji, the highest-ranking priest of Munakata Taisha shrine.

For a long time, Saikaku's background had been not clear. At one point, the prevailing theory was that Saikaku was the wife of Ujisada. However, letters discovered in recent years has revealed that Saikaku was a man sent by the Mōri clan.
