= Zentsūji, Kagawa =

Zentsūji 善通寺市
- City
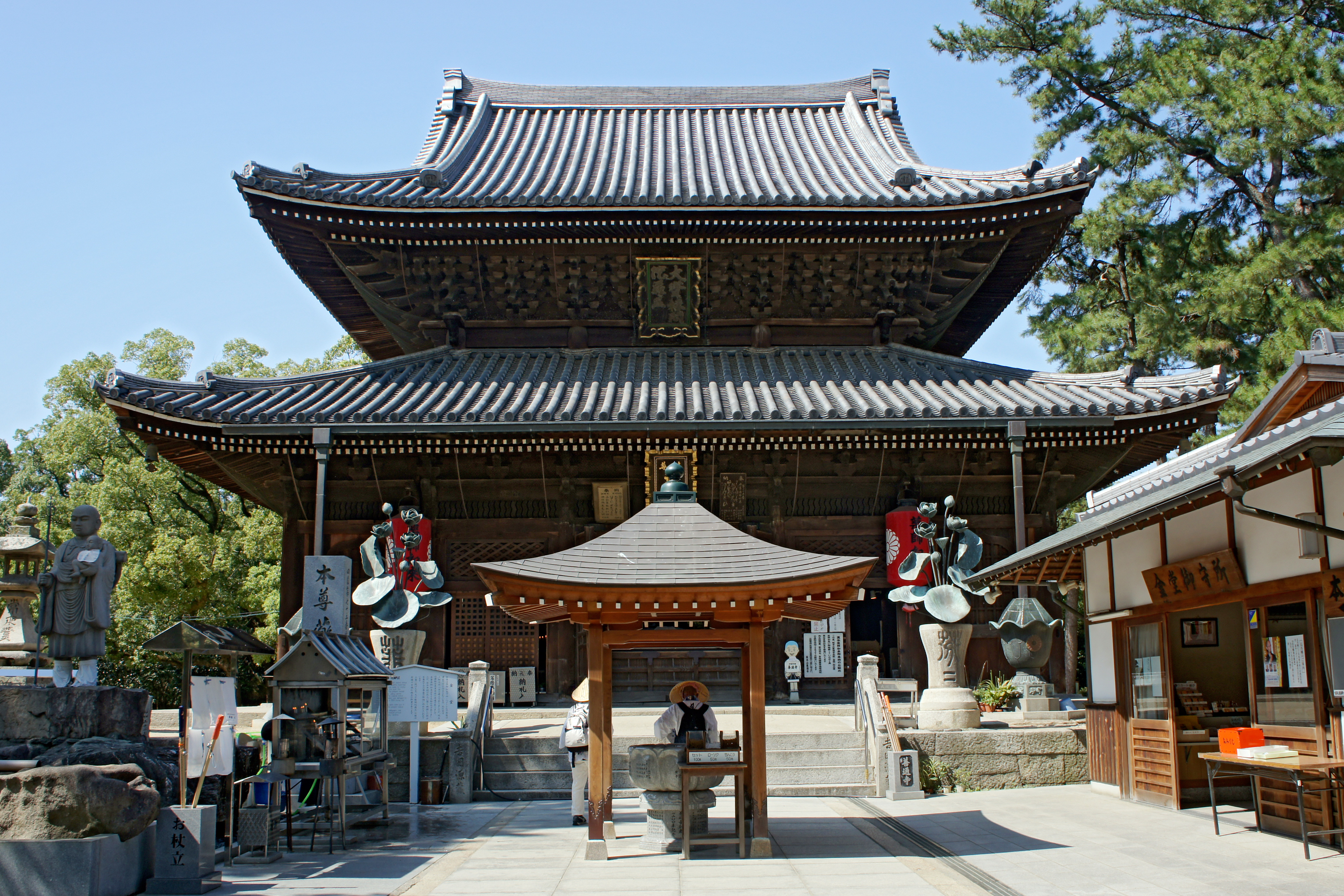
- Zentsū-ji Temple

- Flag Seal
- Location of Zentsūji in Kagawa Prefecture

- Location in Japan
- Coordinates: 34°13′N 133°47′E
- Country: Japan
- Region: Shikoku
- Prefecture: Kagawa
- Village Settled: February 15, 1890
- Town Settled: November 3, 1901
- Citty Settled: March 31, 1954

Government
  - Mayor: Osamu Tsujimura (辻村修) - from May 2022

Area
  - Total: 39.93 km^{2} (15.42 sq mi)

Population (October 1, 2022)
  - Total: 30,780
  - Density: 770.8/km^{2} (1,996/sq mi)
- Time zone: UTC+09:00 (JST)
- City hall address: 2-1-1 Bunkyo, Zentsuji-shi, Kagawa-ken 765-8503
- Website: Official website
- Symbols
- Flower: Chrysanthemum
- Tree: Cinnamomum camphora

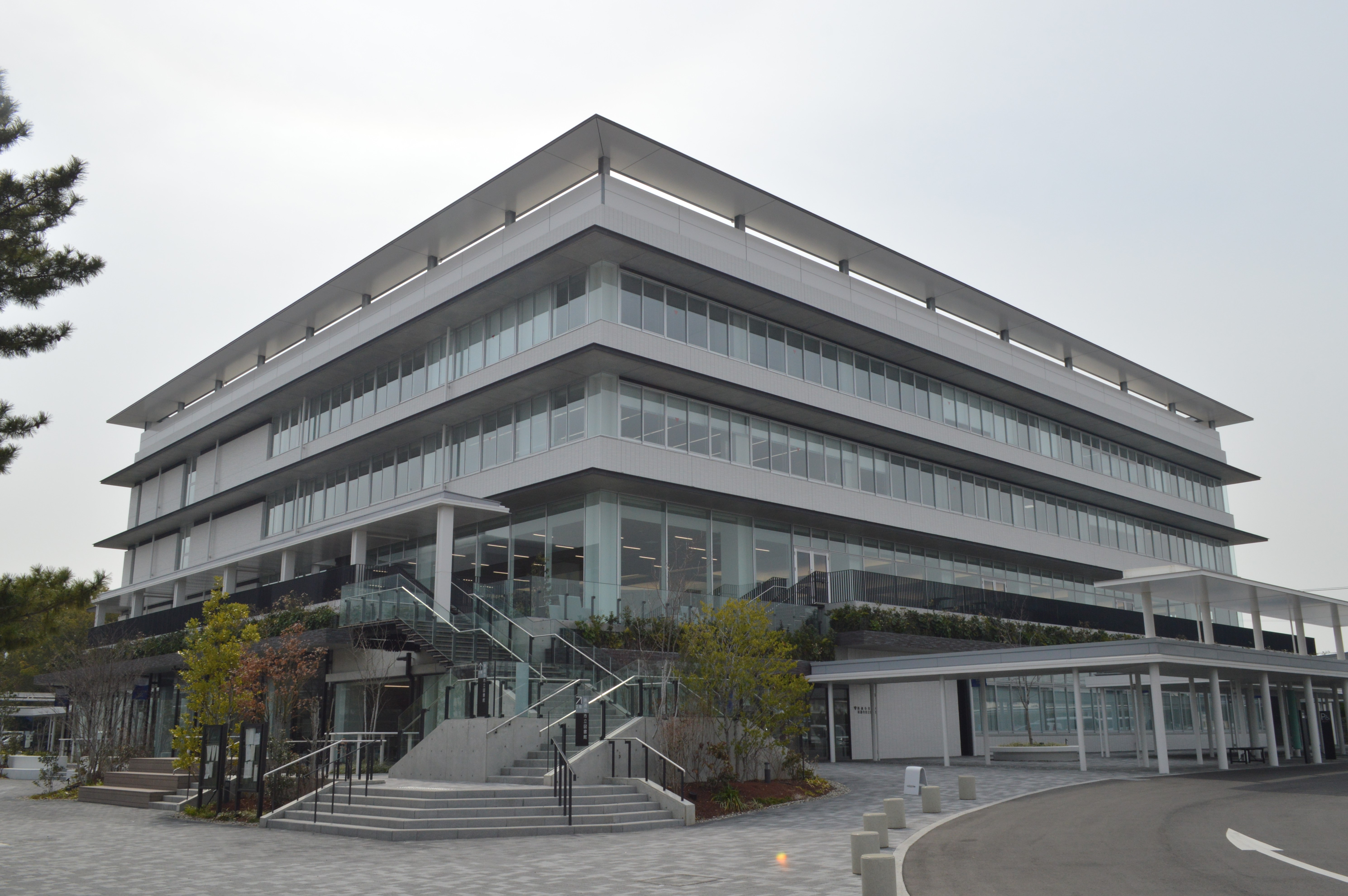
Zentsūji City Hall

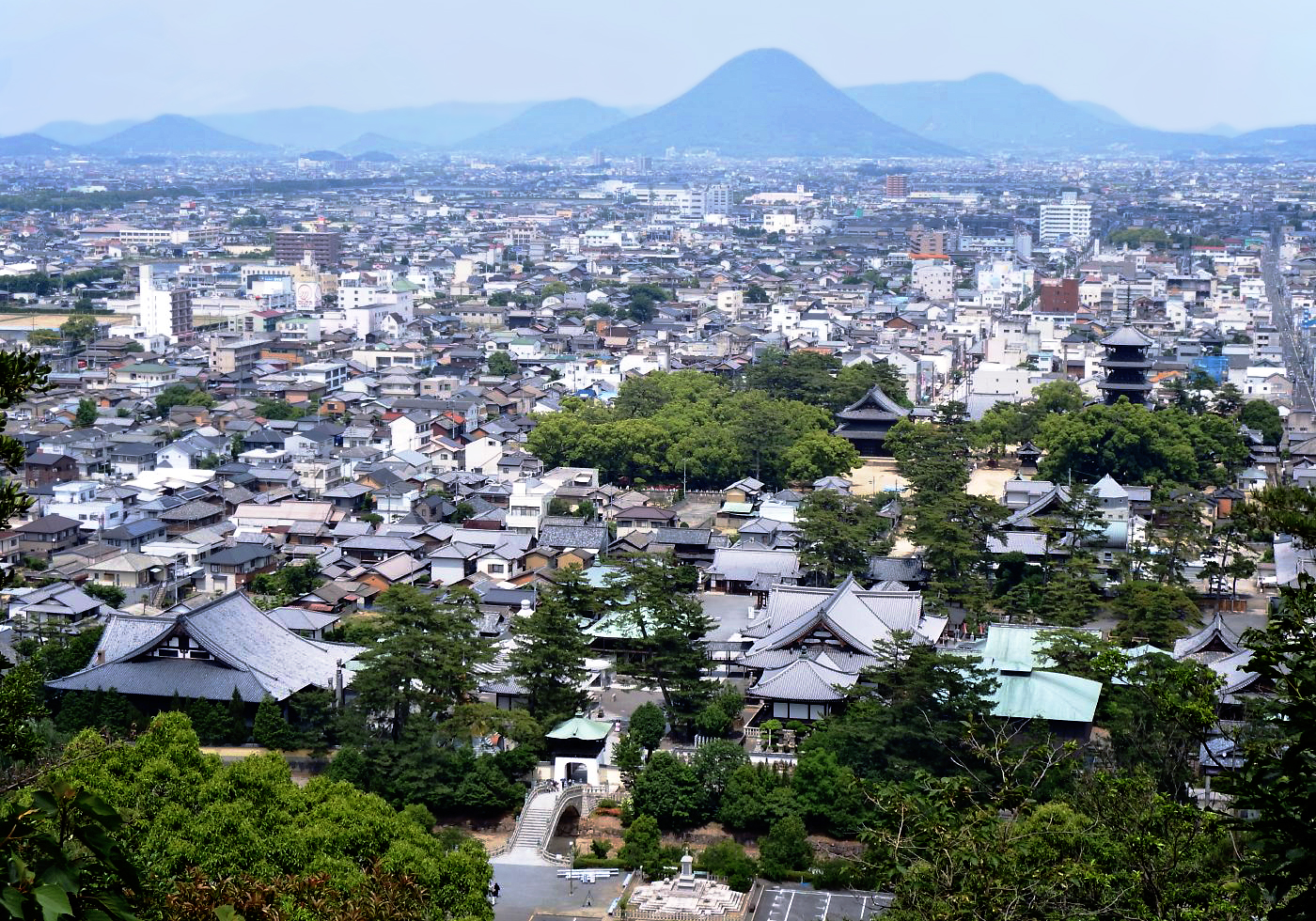
Panoramic view downtown Zentsūji and Zentsū-ji temple

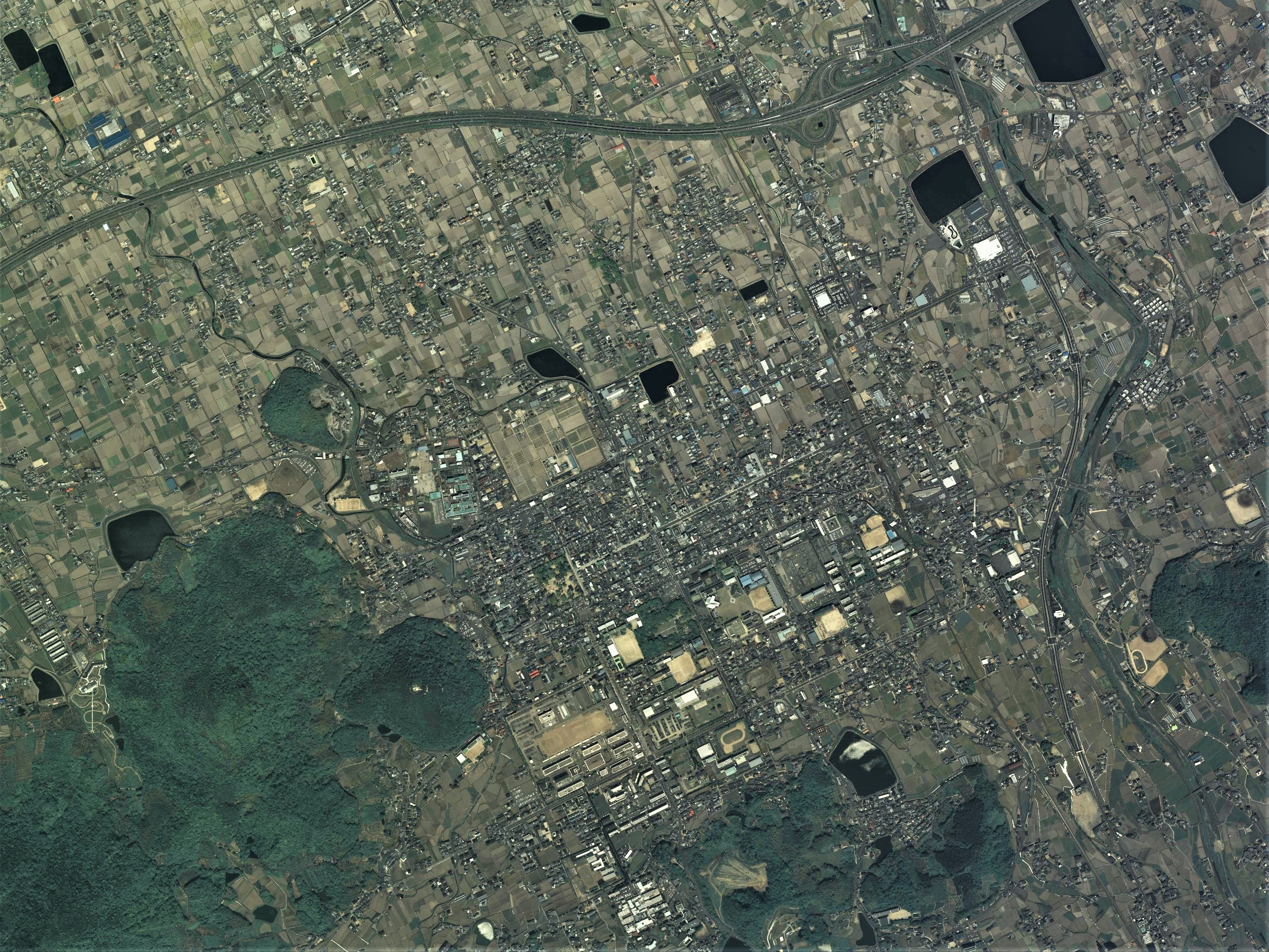
Aerial photograph of central Zentsūji

Zentsūji (善通寺市, Zentsūji-shi) is a city located in Kagawa Prefecture, Japan. As of 1 October 2022, the city had an estimated population of 30,780 in 13096 households and a population density of 770 persons per km^{2}. The total area of the city is 39.93 square kilometres (15.42 sq mi).

== Geography ==
Zentsūji is located in northwestern Kagawa Prefecture. It is the only city in Kagawa Prefecture that does not face the sea.

=== Neighbouring municipalities ===
Kagawa Prefecture

- Kotohira
- Mannō
- Marugame
- Mitoyo
- Tadotsu

=== Climate ===
Zentsūji has a humid subtropical climate (Köppen Cfa) characterized by warm summers and cool winters with light snowfall. The average annual temperature in Zentsūji is 15.1 °C. The average annual rainfall is 1439 mm with September as the wettest month. The temperatures are highest on average in August, at around 26.2 °C, and lowest in January, at around 4.7 °C.

== Demographics ==
Per Japanese census data, the population of Zentsūji has declined slightly in recent decades.

Historical population
Year	Pop.	±%
1960	36,311	—
1970	35,254	−2.9%
1980	38,080	+8.0%
1990	38,423	+0.9%
2000	36,413	−5.2%
2010	33,817	−7.1%
2020	31,631	−6.5%

== History ==
The area of Zentsūji was part of ancient Sanuki Province and has been inhabited since prehistoric times. A number of burial mounds from the Kofun period have been identified, including the Arioka Kofun cluster. The city is the birthplace of the Buddhist monk Kūkai, also known as Kōbō Daishi. Zentsū-ji (from which the city derives its name), was established in 813 on the site of his birth, is the 75th temple on the 88-temple Shikoku Pilgrimage. The city originated as a market town which developed in front of the gates of this temple. During the Edo Period, the city area was part of the holdings of Marugame Domain, Takamatsu Domain and Tadotsu Domain under the Tokugawa shogunate. Following the Meiji restoration, the village of Zentsūji was established within Tado District, Kagawa with the creation of the modern municipalities system on December 16,1878. Tado District became Nakatado District in 1899. Zentsūji was elevated to town status on November 3, 1901 and after merging with four neighboring villages, was elevated to city status on March 31, 1954.

From 1896 to 1945, the IJA 11th Infantry Division was headquartered in Zentsūji, which hosted the largest military base in Shikoku. During World War II, Zentsuji was the location of a Prisoner-of-war camp in World War II. After the war, the former base site was converted into the location for the city hall and Shikoku Gakuin University, in addition to other public facilities. However, the city still retains a strong connection to the military and is the location a Japan Ground Self-Defense Force brigade headquarters and garrison.

== Government ==
Zentsūji has a mayor-council form of government with a directly elected mayor and a unicameral city council of 16 members. Zentsūji contributes two members to the Kagawa Prefectural Assembly. In terms of national politics, the city is part of Kagawa 3rd district of the lower house of the Diet of Japan.

== Economy ==
The economy of Zentsūji is primarily food-related. Farmers of the Zentsūji region found a way to grow cubic watermelons, by growing the fruits in glass boxes and letting them naturally assume the shape of the receptacle. The square shape is designed to make the melons easier to stack and store, but the square watermelons are often more than double the price of normal ones. Pyramid shaped watermelons have also been developed.

== Education ==
Zentsūji has eight public elementary schools and two public middle schools operated by the city government, and one public high school operated by the Kagawa Prefectural Board of Education. There is also one private high school. Zentsūji is also home to Shikoku Gakuin University.

- Shikoku Gakuin Junior College

== Transportation ==
=== Railways ===
Shikoku Railway Company - Dosan Line

- Konzōji - Zentsūji

=== Highways ===
- Takamatsu Expressway
- National Route 11
- National Route 319

== Sister cities ==
- El Dorado, Arkansas, United States
- Hirado, Nagasaki, Japan
- Kōya, Wakayama, Japan

== Local attractions ==
- Arioka Kofun cluster, National Historic Site
- Amagiri Castle ruins, National Historic Site
- Konzō-ji, 73rd temple on the Shikoku Pilgrimage
- Kōyama-ji, 74th temple on the Shikoku Pilgrimage
- Mandara-ji, 72nd temple on the Shikoku Pilgrimage
- Shusshaka-ji, 73rd temple on the Shikoku Pilgrimage
- Zentsū-ji, 75th temple on the Shikoku Pilgrimage

== Noted people from Zentsūji ==
- Atsuko Takahata, actress
- Yoshiki Yamashita, politician
