= Kagawa clan =

- Dissolution: 17th century

The Kagawa clan was a minor Japanese clan. During the Sengoku period (1467–1615), the Kagawa had strong bonds with the powerful Chōsokabe clan, receiving members of the Chōsokabe family for adoptive survival. The clan died out after the Chōsokabe fatally rebelled against the Tokugawa Shogunate in the early 17th century.

The Aki Kagawa clan is a clan descended from the Kagawa clan of the Kamakura clan, based in Aki Province.

On June 14, 1221, Kagawa Tsunetaka's son Tsunetaka was given Yagi in Aki Province, and his younger brother Yoshikage was given Guntoya in Yamagata, Aki Province, for their contributions in the Jōkyū War. On March 3, 1222, Yoshikage moved from Sagami Province to Aki Province with his older brother Tsunetaka's eldest son, Kagawa Kagemitsu, and built a mountain castle (Yagi Castle) at the foot of Yagiyama, jutting out into the Taiga River.

According to the Geihan Tsushi, Kagawa Tsunetaka's son Saburo Tsunetaka was given many territories as a reward for his contributions in the Jōkyū War. Among Tsunekage's sons, Kagemitsu became the land steward of Yagi in Saeki County (Asa County) in Aki Province, and is said to have moved to Aki Province and established Yagi Castle as his base.

In the early Sengoku period, he served the Aki-Takeda clan, but the Aki-Takeda clan weakened in battles with the Ouchi and Mori clans. The head of the Kagawa clan at that time, Kagawa Kagemitsu, supported the Aki-Takeda clan until the end, but defected due to internal conflicts and followed the Mori clan. The name of the Aki-Kagawa clan can be found in the Unshu Gunwa and Anzai Gunsaku.

After that, Kagemitsu played an active role as a vassal of the Mori clan, and also served as a part of the Mori navy (Kawauchi navy), participating in many battles. When the Mori clan was transferred to Suo and Nagato after the Battle of Sekigahara in 1600, the main line of the Kagawa clan served as the chief retainer of the Iwakuni-ryo Kikkawa clan. There were also many members of the Kagawa clan who remained in Aki Province.

Masanori Kagawa, a member of the Kagawa clan, wrote the Intokuki at the command of his lord. His second son, Kagetsugu, went to Kyoto in 1673, took the name Nobuaki, revised and expanded the Intokuki, and published it as the Intoku Taiheiki. Nobuaki abandoned his samurai life and lived in Kyoto as a poet, serving the Tokudaiji family under the pseudonym "Baigetsudo." His descendants also served the Tokudaiji family for generations, producing many famous poets until the Meiji Restoration.
