= Marugame Domain =

Administrative division in Japan during the Edo period (1608–1871)

Marugame Domain 丸亀藩
- Domain of Japan
- 1641–1871
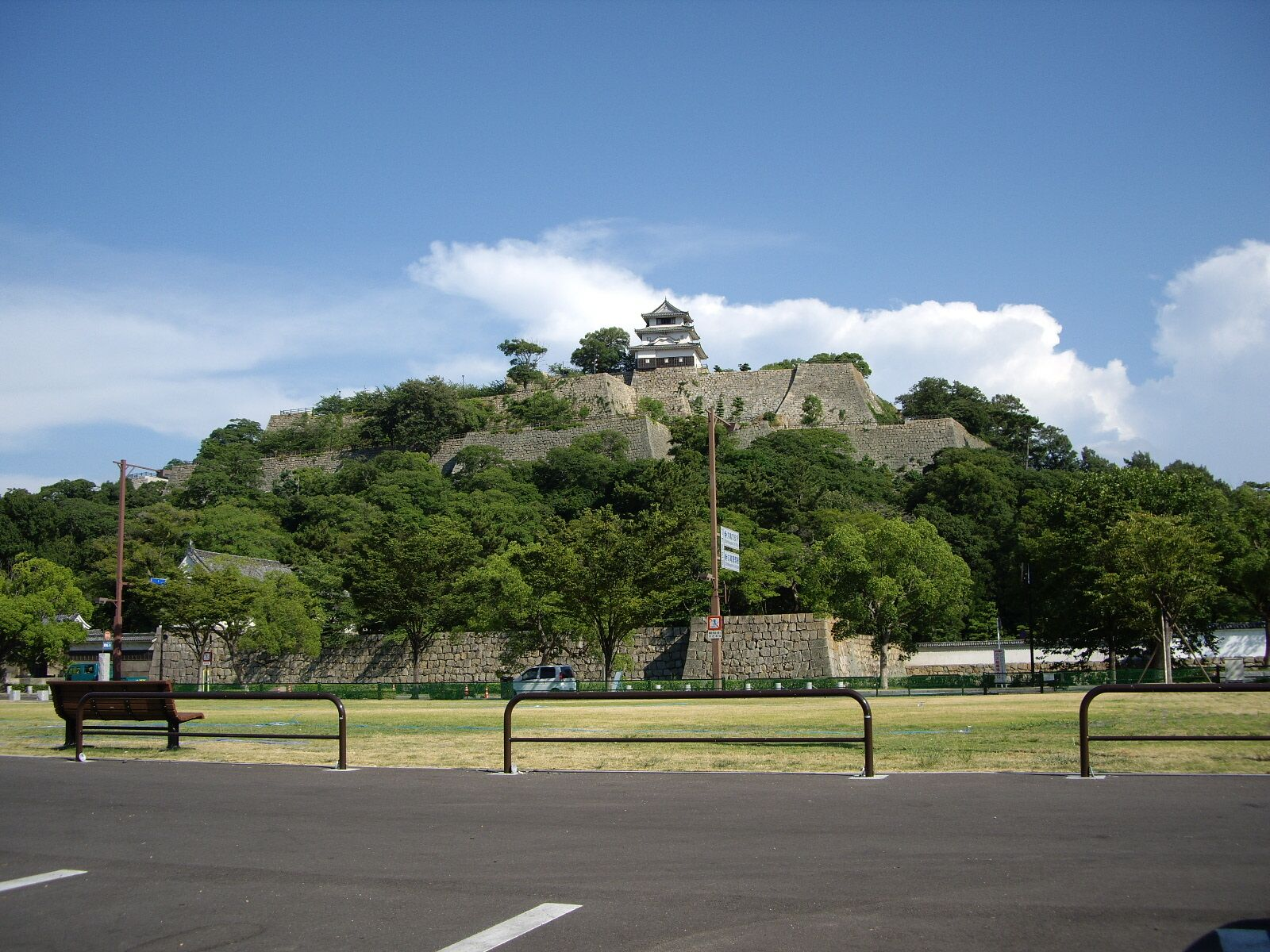
- Marugame Castle in Marugame, Kagawa

- Mon of the Kyōgoku clan
- Capital: Marugame Castle
- Area
  - Coordinates: 34°17′10.63″N 133°48′0.35″E
- Historical era: Edo period
  - Established: 1641
  - Abolition of the han system: 1871
- Contained within
  - Province: Sanuki
- Today part of: Kagawa Prefecture

Location of Marugame Castle
Marugame Domain (Japan)

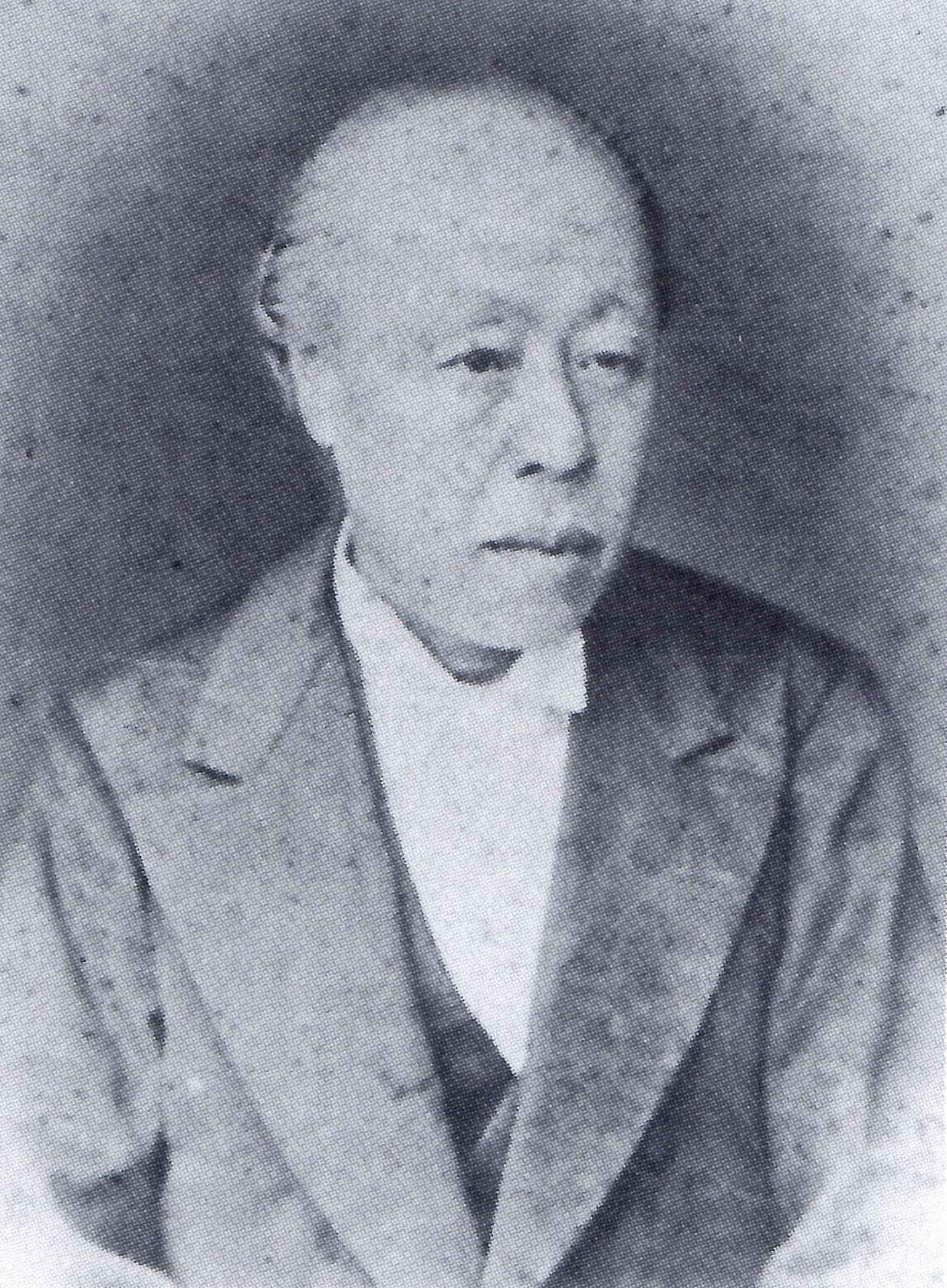
Kyōgoku Akiyuki

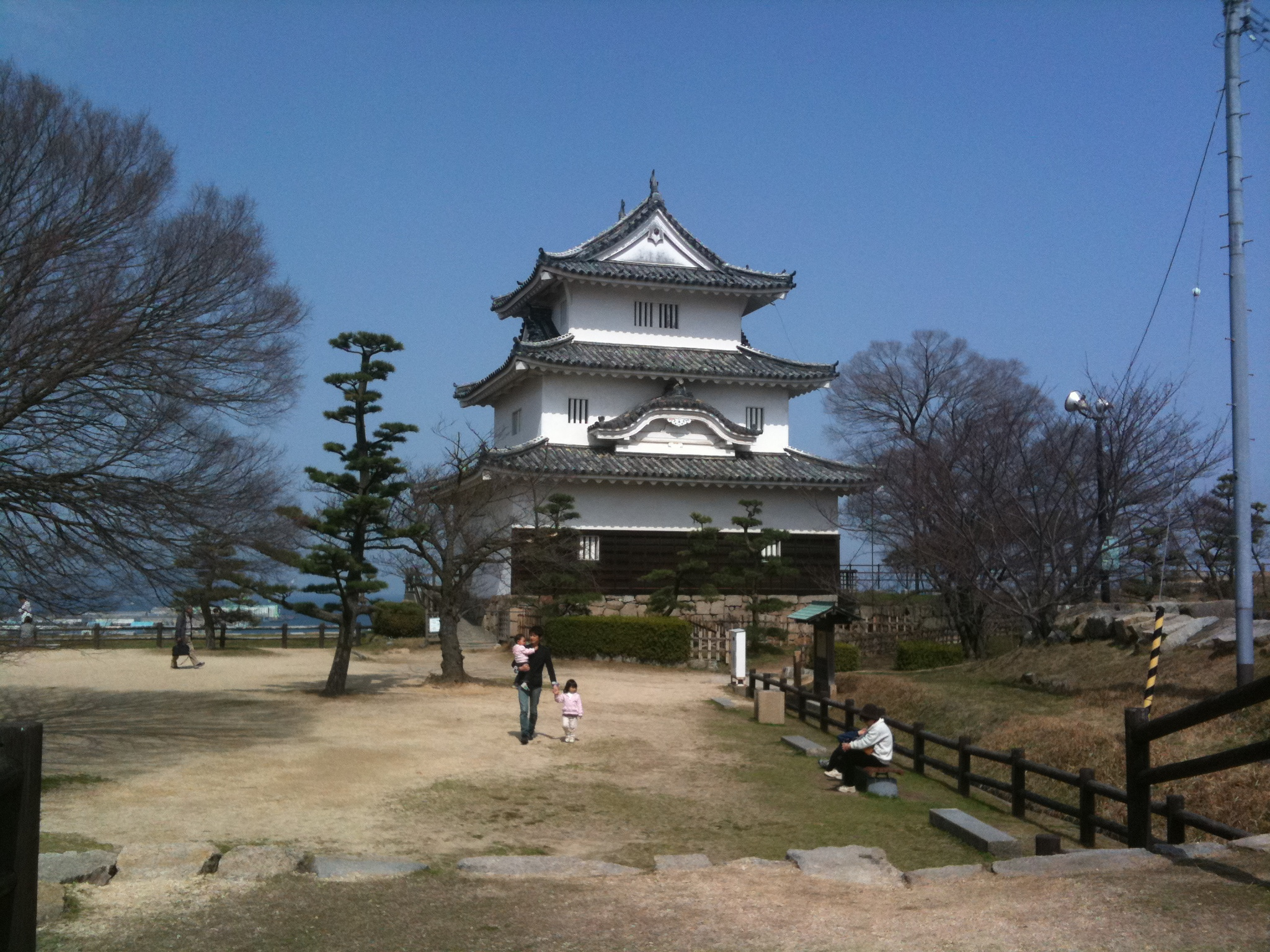
Marugame Castle

Marugame Domain (丸亀藩, Marugame-han) was a feudal domain under the Tokugawa shogunate of Edo period Japan, in what is now Kagawa Prefecture on the island of Shikoku. It was centered around Marugame Castle, and was ruled throughout much of its history by a cadet branch of the tozama daimyō Kyōgoku clan. Marugame Domain was dissolved in the abolition of the han system in 1871 and is now part of Kagawa Prefecture.

== History of Marugame Domain ==
Ikoma Chikamasa, a general in the service of Toyotomi Hideyoshi, was awarded territories in Sanuki Province with a kokudaka of 171,800 koku in 1587, and construction was begun on Marugame Castle in 1597. In 1600 at the Battle of Sekigahara, Chikamasa was part of Ishida Mitsunari's Western Army while his son, Ikoma Kazumasa was part of Tokugawa Ieyasu's Eastern Army. Chikamasa remained at his stronghold at Takamatsu Castle and sent his retainers in his stead to attack Tanabe castle in Tango Province. He chose this strategy to preserve the Ikoma clan regardless of which side prevailed. Because Kazumasa fought on the side of Tokugawa Ieyasu, the Ikoma were permitted to keep their existing domain; however Chikamasa was forced to take responsibility being on the losing side by transferring the clan chieftainship to his son in 1602. In 1615, immigrants from Ako Domain established salt production at Marugame. The same year, the Tokugawa shogunate ordered the demolition of Marugame Castle under the "one castle per domain" ruling. The Ikoma clan was demoted to Yashima Domain in Dewa Province by the shogunate in 1640 due to attainder following an uprising. The Ikoma territory was divided, with large portions going to Saijō, Ōzu and Imabari Domain in neighboring Iyo Province.The remaining portion centered on Marugame Castle became Marugame Domain and was awarded to Yamazaki Ieharu, formerly from Tomioka Domain in Higo Province in 1641. The following year, he restored Marugame Castle. The Yamazaki clan died out after three generations in 1658 and was replaced by a cadet branch of the Kyōgoku clan from Tatsuno Domain in Harima Province. From 1660 to 1680, Marugame Castle was expanded and its current tenshu completed. In 1694, a 10,000 koku portion of the domain was separated out to form a sub-domain, Tadotsu Domain (多度津藩, Tadotsu han). The domain profited greatly from its position on the main pilgrimage route to the shrine of Kotohira-gū; however, Marugame Domain also attempted various stratagems to overcome financial difficulties. In 1705, the first paper currency was issued. In the Tenmei era, the underemployed samurai of the domain were assigned to make uchiwa fans to supplement their income. A han school, the "Seimeikan" was opened in 1794.

The domain was an early and staunch supporter of the Imperial side in the Bakumatsu period and often sent troops to help guard the Kyoto Imperial Palace. Following the Battle of Toba-Fushimi, the domain was ordered to attack neighboring Takamatsu Domain, which had been designated as an enemy of the crown: however, Marugame worked as an intermediary to secure a pardon for Matsudaira Yoritsuna, the daimyō of that domain. In February 1869, Kyōgoku Akiyuki was one of the first to daimyō sign over his domain to the new Meiji government. In 1871, domain was also one of the first to be abolished under the abolition of the han system and became "Marugame Prefecture" which subsequent was merged into modern Kagawa Prefecture.

== History of Tadotsu Domain ==
The third Kyōgoku daimyō of Marugame, Kyōgoku Takamochi, was only age three when he succeeded his father. The domain therefore petitioned the Tokugawa shogunate to divide the holding with his brother-in-law, Kyōgoku Takamichi, who would serve as official guardian. This was accomplished by setting aside a 10,000 koku portion of the domain to allow Kyōgoku Takamichi to set up a cadet branch of the clan as daimyō of the newly-created Tadotsu Domain. However, Kyōgoku Takamichi was himself only age 4, so he continued to live within Marugame Castle. It was only during the tenure of the Kyōgoku Takakata in 1827 that a jin'ya was actually built within the territory of the sub-domain itself, in what is now part of the town of Tadotsu, Kagawa.

== Holdings at the end of the Edo period ==
As with most domains in the han system, Marugame consisted of several discontinuous territories calculated to provide the assigned kokudaka, based on periodic cadastral surveys and projected agricultural yields.

=== Marugame Domain ===
- Sanuki Province
  - 46 villages in Toyota District
  - 32 villages in Mino District
  - 23 villages in Naka District
  - 1 village in Utari District
  - 9 villages in Tado District
- Omi Province
  - 2 villages in Gamō District
  - 2 villages in Sakata District
- Harima Province
  - 6 villages in Ittō District
  - 22 villages in Issai District

=== Tadotsu Domain ===
- Sanuki Province
  - 5 villages in Mino District
  - 15 villages in Tado District

== List of daimyō (Marugame) ==
#	Name	Tenure	Courtesy title	Court Rank	kokudaka
Yamazaki clan, 1641–1657 (Tozama)
1	Yamazaki Ieharu (山崎家治)	1641–1648	Kai-no-kami (甲斐守)	Junior 5th Rank, Lower Grade (従五位下)	173,000 koku
2	Yamazaki Toshiie (山崎俊家)	1648–1651	Shima-no-kami (志摩守)	Junior 5th Rank, Lower Grade (従五位下)	173,000 koku
3	Yamazaki Haruyori (山崎治頼)	1652–1657	-none-	-none-	173,000 koku
Kyōgoku clan, 1658–1871 (Tozama)
1	Kyōgoku Takakazu (京極高和)	1658–1662	Gyobu-taiyu (刑部大輔)	Junior 5th Rank, Lower Grade (従五位下)	60,000 koku
2	Kyōgoku Takatoyo (京極高豊)	1662–1694	Bitchu-no-kami (備中守)	Junior 5th Rank, Lower Grade (従五位下)	60,000 koku
3	Kyōgoku Takamochi (京極高或)	1694–1724	Wakasa-no-kami (若狭守)	Junior 5th Rank, Lower Grade (従五位下)	60,000 ->50,000 koku
4	Kyōgoku Takanori (京極高矩)	1724–1763	Sado-no-kami (佐渡守)	Junior 5th Rank, Lower Grade (従五位下)	50,000 koku
5	Kyōgoku Takanaka (京極高中)	1763–1811	Wakasa-no-kami (若狭守)	Junior 5th Rank, Lower Grade (従五位下)	50,000 koku
6	Kyōgoku Takaakira (京極高朗)	1811–1850	Nagato-no-kami (長門守)	Junior 5th Rank, Lower Grade (従五位下)	50,000 koku
7	Kyōgoku Akiyuki (京極朗徹)	1850–1871	Sado-no-kami (佐渡守)	Junior 5th Rank, Upper Grade (従五位上)	50,000 koku

== List of daimyō (Tadotsu) ==
#	Name	Tenure	Courtesy title	Court Rank	kokudaka
Kyōgoku clan, 1694–1871 (Tozama)
1	Kyōgoku Takamichi (京極高通)	1694–1735	Iki-no-kami (壱岐守)	Junior 5th Rank, Lower Grade (従五位下)	10,000 koku
2	Kyōgoku Takayoshi (京極高慶)	1735–1756	Dewa-no-kami (出羽守)	Junior 5th Rank, Lower Grade (従五位下)	10,000 koku
3	Kyōgoku Takafumi (京極高文)	1756–1796	Iki-no-kami (壱岐守)	Junior 5th Rank, Lower Grade (従五位下)	10,000 koku
4	Kyōgoku Takakata (京極高賢)	1796–1833	Iki-no-kami (壱岐守)	Junior 5th Rank, Lower Grade (従五位下)	10,000 koku
5	Kyōgoku Takateru (京極高琢)	1833–1859	Iki-no-kami (壱岐守)	Junior 5th Rank, Lower Grade (従五位下)	10,000 koku
6	Kyōgoku Takamasa (京極高典)	1859–1871	Iki-no-kami (壱岐守); later Kawachi-no-kami (河内守),Shimōsa-no-kami (下総守)	Junior 5th Rank, Lower Grade (従五位下)	10,000 koku

== See also ==
- List of Han
- Abolition of the han system
