= Yoritake Matsudaira =

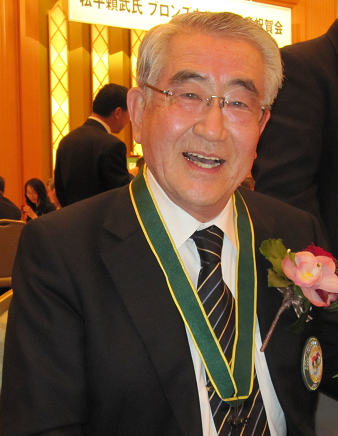
- Born: August 17, 1938 (age 88)

Yoritake Matsudaira (松平賴武, Matsudaira Yoritake; born August 17, 1938 in Kagawa, Japan) present chairman of Hongō Gakuen, served as the international commissioner and member of the board of directors of the Scout Association of Japan, as well as a member of the Asia-Pacific Regional Scout Committee and a founding member of the World Buddhist Scout Brotherhood. Matsudaira retired from the post of International Commissioner on reaching the retirement age of 65 in 2003, and presently serves as president (Renmei-chō) of the Kagawa Scout Council.

In 2012, Matsudaira was awarded the 337th Bronze Wolf, the only distinction of the World Organization of the Scout Movement, awarded by the World Scout Committee for exceptional services to world Scouting. His father Yorihiro Matsudaira received the award in 1981.

Matsudaira, whose namesake was a daimyō of the Edo period, the fourth lord of Takamatsu, is the 14th head of the Matsudaira family. As a Scout, he traveled to Texas and New Mexico in the United States and was a guest on a military base. After graduation from Waseda University, he worked for Toshiba. Now he is the president of Hongō Junior and Senior High School in Tokyo (本郷学園, Hongō Gakuen). One of his hobbies is horseback riding, he is an amateur radio aficionado, and he gives lectures about the advantages of Scouting activities.

== Ancestry ==
Yoritake is a second cousin of the present head of the Tokugawa clan, Tokugawa Tsunenari, as both are great-grandsons of Nabeshima Naohiro, the 11th and last daimyō of Saga. By virtue of his descent from the kuge Madenokōji family, he is also a sixth cousin once removed of the present Emperor, Akihito.

Ancestors of Yoritake Matsudaira

16. Matsudaira Yorihiro, 9th daimyō of Takamatsu (1798–1842)
8. Count Matsudaira Yoritoshi, 11th daimyō of Takamatsu (1834–1903)
17. Asada Yae
4. Matsudaira Yutaka (1879–1945)
18. Tairō Ii Naosuke, 15th daimyō of Hikone (1815–1860)
9. Ii Chiyoko (1846–1927)
19. Senda Shizue
2. Count Matsudaira Yorihiro (1909–1990)
20. Nabeshima Naomasa, 10th daimyō of Saga (1815–1871)
10. Marquess Nabeshima Naohiro, 11th daimyō of Saga (1846–1921)
21. Tokugawa Tatsuko (1830–1886)
5. Lady Nabeshima Toshiko (1890–1985)
11. Asa Chiyo
1. Matsudaira Yoritake
24. Sakai Tadaaki, 12th/14th daimyō of Obama (1813–1873)
12. Count Sakai Tadamichi (1851–1920)
25. Matsudaira Mitsuko
6. Count Sakai Tadatae (1883–1939)
26. Sakai Tadamasu, 7th daimyō of Tsuruga (1815–1876)
13. Lady Sakai Kako (1852–1892)
27. Sakai (1827–1905)
3. Lady Sakai Kaeko (1916–1997)
28. Madenokōji Hirofusa (1824–1884)
14. Count Madenokōji Michifusa (1848–1932)
29. Mori Sadako (d. 1860)
7. Lady Madenokōji Kimiko (1889–1927)
30. Ikeda Kenzō
15. Ikeda Yaeko (1850–1897)

== Sources ==
- Scout Association of Japan publication celebrating the award of the Bronze Wolf to Yoritake Matsudaira
- inbox@apr Monthly e-Newsletter of World Scout Bureau Asia-Pacific Region, June 2004
