= Matsudaira Yorihiro =

Matsudaira Yorihiro may refer to:

- Matsudaira Yorihiro (Moriyama) (1703-1763)
- Matsudaira Yorihiro (Takamatsu) (1798–1842)
- Yorihiro Matsudaira (1909–1990)
