= Tamamo =

Tamamo may refer to:

- Tamamo-no-Mae, a legendary figure in Japanese mythology
- Tamamo Castle, or Takamatsu Castle (Sanuki), is located in Takamatsu, Kagawa Prefecture, on the island of Shikoku, Japan
- Tamamo Cross (foaled 1984), Japanese Thoroughbred racehorse
