= Ryota Asano =

Japan international rugby union player

- Born: Ryota Asano; 25 September 1979 (age 47) Chiba Prefecture, Japan
- Height: 6 ft 0 in (1.83 m)
- Weight: 224 lb (102 kg; 16.0 st)
- School: Hongō High School
- University: Hosei University

Rugby union career
- Position(s): Flanker, Lock, Number 8
Amateur team(s)
Years	Team	Apps	(Points)
- Hongō High School
-2002	Hosei University		
Senior career
Years	Team	Apps	(Points)
2002-2014	NEC		
International career
Years	Team	Apps	(Points)
2002-2007	Japan	22	(0)

Ryota Asano (浅野良太, Asano Ryōta) (born Chiba Prefecture, 25 September 1979) is a Japanese rugby union player with 22 caps and 0 points in aggregate. He played as flanker, lock and number eight. His nickname is Popi (ぽぴ～, Popi~).

== Career ==
Asano started to play rugby when he attended Hongō High School. Later, he went to play for the Hosei University rugby union team until his graduation in 2002, when he joined NEC, where he would play for his entire club career until his retirement in 2014. At international level he debuted for a non-test Japan national team in 2002, although his first test cap would be on 5 June 2003, during a match against Australia A, at Hanazono, Osaka. He was also part of the 2003 and 2007 Japan World Cup squads. His last international cap was on 20 September 2007, during a match against Wales, at the Millennium Stadium, Cardiff. As of September 2012, Asano played 100 games in Top League. After his retirement, Asano became coach of the Kokugakuin High School rugby team in Tochigi.

== Notes ==
.
