= Ienaga =

Ienaga is both a Japanese surname (written: 家長, 家長) and a masculine Japanese given name (written: 家長). Notable people with the name include:

== Last name ==
- Akihiro Ienaga (born 1986), Japanese footballer
- Saburō Ienaga (1913–2002), Japanese historian

== First name ==
- Minamoto no Ienaga (1170 – 1234), Japanese waka poet
- Naitō Ienaga (1546–1600), Japanese samurai
- Ikoma Ienaga (died 1607), Japanese samurai
