= Yamazaki clan =

Yamazaki 山崎氏
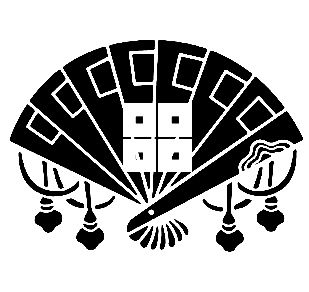
- Mon of the Yamazaki clan
- Home province: Ōmi
- Parent house: Sasaki clan; Uda Genji
- Titles: Peerage (Baron)
- Founder: Yamazaki Norie?
- Final ruler: Yamazaki Harutoshi
- Current head: None
- Dissolution: 1871
- Ruled until: July 1871, abolition of the han system
- Cadet branches: Eihara clan

The Yamazaki clan (山崎氏, Yamazaki-shi), a samurai and aristocratic clan in Japan, was a branch of the Uda Genji and the Sasaki clan and was elevated to the rank of daimyo by Toyotomi Hideyoshi in the Kamakura period. Initially serving as the lord of Marugame Domain in Sanuki Province during the early Edo period, they were later deprived of their domain, with a branch remaining as a lower-ranking samurai family. After the Meiji Restoration, they established the Nariwa Domain in Bitchū Province and were ennobled as a kazoku (baronial) family.

Apart from this Yamazaki clan, there are numerous other Yamazaki clans with different genealogies.

== History ==
It is said that Yamazaki Noriie, the descendant of Emperor Uda serving under Rokkaku Yoshikata was given land in Yamazaki, Ōmi Province. Noriie's son, Yamazaki Kataie served under Rokkaku clan, Oda clan, and Toyotomi clan, becoming the owner of Sanda, Settsu Province, worth 23,000 goku. The clan were moved to Marugame Domain, Sanuki Province worth 50,000 goku. The clan was later deprived of their position due to the lack of heirs in 1657 after the death of Yamazaki Haruyori.

== See also ==
- List of han
- Abolition of the han system
