= Yorihiro Matsudaira =

- Count Matsudaira (wearing leis) departing Honolulu in summer 1953
- Born: August 13, 1909
- Died: February 23, 1990 (aged 80)

Count Yorihiro Matsudaira (松平頼明, Matsudaira Yorihiro) (August 13, 1909 – February 23, 1990), Riji of Hongō Gakuen, who was the descendant of the feudal lord of the former Takamatsu Domain, served as the International Commissioner of the Boy Scouts of Japan as well as president of the Kagawa Scout Council. He was one of the original founders of Japanese Scouting in 1922.

== Career ==
Count Matsudaira, whose namesake was a daimyō of the late Edo period, the ninth lord of Takamatsu, was the 13th head of the Matsudaira family. He established a troop in Tokyo, now Gakushūin Group 1 in Toshima. He had an extended tour of the United States, leading a delegation of 22 Japanese Boy Scouts to the National Jamboree of the Boy Scouts of America, held at Irvine Ranch in southern California in July 1953 and later spent a month at the Schiff Scout Reservation in New Jersey, attending the national training school for Scout executives. He also visited Arthur A. Schuck, the Chief Scout Executive at the national office of the Boy Scouts of America in New York City. In 1955, Kingsley C. Dassanaike worked to promote Scouting for the deaf and blind to Matsudaira, who would later found the Nippon Agoonoree based on their work together.

== Awards and honors ==
In 1981, Matsudaira was awarded the 149th Bronze Wolf, the only distinction of the World Organization of the Scout Movement, awarded by the World Scout Committee for exceptional services to world Scouting, at the 28th World Scout Conference. His son Yoritake Matsudaira received the same award in 2012. In 1989, Yorihiro Matsudaira also received the highest distinction of the Scout Association of Japan, the Golden Pheasant Award.

== Ancestry ==
Ancestors of Yorihiro Matsudaira

16. Tokugawa Harutoshi, 7th daimyō of Mito (1773–1816)
8. Matsudaira Yorihiro, 9th daimyō of Takamatsu (1798–1842)
17. Nakayama Yaezaki
4. Count Matsudaira Yoritoshi, 11th daimyō of Takamatsu (1834–1903)
18. Asada
9. Asada Yae
2. Matsudaira Yutaka (1879–1945)
20. Ii Naonaka, 13th daimyō of Hikone (1766–1831)
10. Tairō Ii Naosuke, 15th daimyō of Hikone (1815–1860)
21. Kimita Tomi (1785–1819)
5. Ii Chiyoko (1846–1927)
22. Senda Takashina
11. Senda Shizue
1. Count Matsudaira Yorihiro
24. Nabeshima Narinao, 9th daimyō of Saga (1780–1839)
12. Nabeshima Naomasa, 10th daimyō of Saga (1815–1871)
25. Ikeda Sachiko (1788–1837)
6. Marquess Nabeshima Naohiro, 11th daimyō of Saga (1846–1921)
26. Tokugawa Narimasa, 3rd Tayasu-Tokugawa family head (1779–1848)
13. Tokugawa Tatsuko (1830–1886)
27. Seishōin (1796–1871)
3. Lady Nabeshima Toshiko (1890–1985)
7. Asa Chiyo

== Sources ==
- Dr. László Nagy, 250 Million Scouts, the World Scout Foundation and Dartnell Publishers, 1985, complete list through 1981
