= Matsudaira Yoritake =

Japanese daimyō

Matsudaira Yoritake 松平 頼桓
- Chamberlain, Upper 4th Rank
- Lord: Tokugawa Yoshimune
- Born: July 23, 1720
- Died: October 18, 1739 (aged 19)
Era dates
- mid-Edo
Posthumous name
- Kaikō

Matsudaira Yoritake (松平 頼桓; tenure 1735–1739) was a Japanese daimyō of the Edo period, who ruled the Takamatsu Domain. Yoritake was the son of Matsudaira Yorihiro and great-grandson of Matsudaira Yorishige, lord of Takamatsu.

His descendant Yoritake Matsudaira, named after him, is a notable of Japanese Scouting and recipient of the Bronze Wolf.

Preceded by Matsudaira Yoritoyo	4th Daimyō of Takamatsu (Mito-Matsudaira); 1735–1739	Succeeded by Matsudaira Yoritaka (Takamatsu)
