= Ikoma Kazumasa =

Japanese samurai (1555–1610)

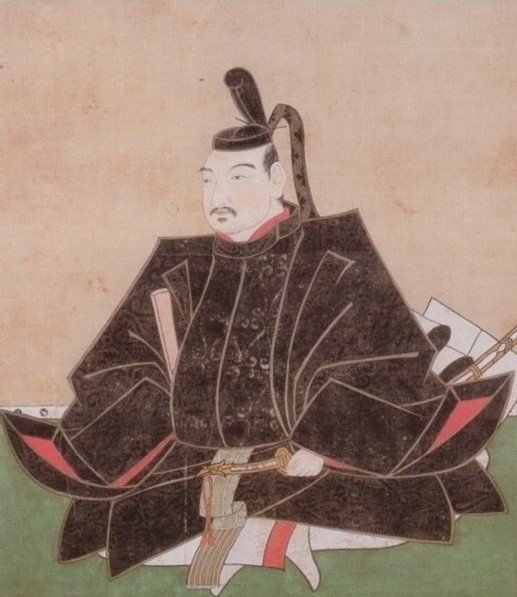
Ikoma Kazumasa

Ikoma Kazumasa (生駒 一正, 1555 – May 11, 1610) was a Japanese samurai of the Sengoku period who lived into the early Edo period; he served the Oda clan, the Toyotomi, and then the Tokugawa. He was also the daimyō of the Takamatsu Domain.

Kazumasa was the eldest son of Ikoma Chikamasa. He fought with distinction under Oda Nobunaga, and then in Korea with Toyotomi Hideyoshi's forces. He sided with the Tokugawa at the Battle of Sekigahara, though his father sided with the forces of Ishida Mitsunari; as a result, the Ikoma family's fief was saved. His father yielded him headship in 1600. It was then that the fief's capital was moved from Marugame Castle to Takamatsu Castle.

After Kazumasa's death in 1610, his son Masatoshi succeeded him.

Preceded by Ikoma Chikamasa	2nd Daimyō of Takamatsu (Ikoma); 1600–1610	Succeeded by Ikoma Masatoshi
