= Yashima Domain =

Yashima Domain 矢島藩
- under Tokugawa shogunate Japan
- 1640–1658; 1868–1871
- Capital: Yashima jin'ya
  - Type: Daimyō
- Historical era: Edo period
  - Established: 1640
  - Disestablished: 1871
- Today part of: part of Akita Prefecture

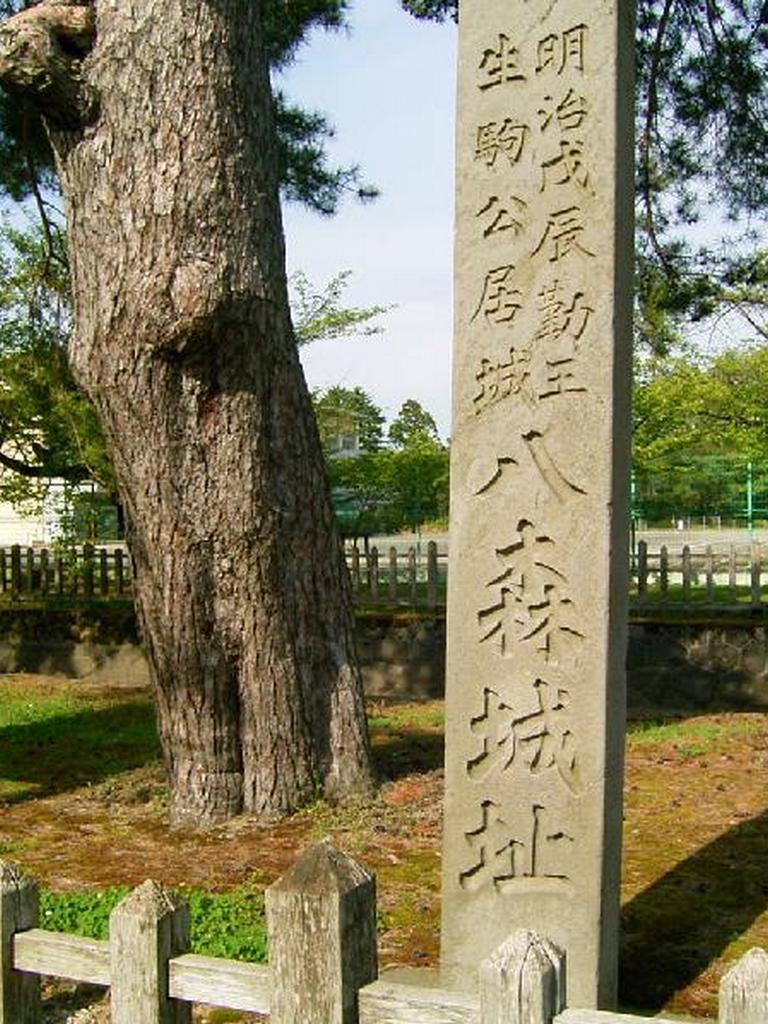
Site of Yashima Jin'ya on the grounds of Yashima Elementary School, Yurihonjō, Akita

Yashima Domain (矢島藩, Yashima-han) was a feudal domain in Edo period Japan, located in Dewa Province (modern-day Akita Prefecture), Japan. It was centered on Yashima Jin'ya in the former town of Yashima, Akita, in what is now part of the city of Yurihonjō, Akita.

== History ==
The Ikoma clan was originally a powerful 171,800-koku daimyō clan ruling Takamatsu Domain in Sanuki Province. However, the Ikoma were dispossessed in 1640 due to gross mismanagement by Ikoma Takatoshi which resulted in an O-Ie Sōdō by his retainers. The Tokugawa shogunate reassigned the clan to the newly created 10,000 koku Yashima Domain in the inhospitable foothills of Mount Chōkai in central Dewa Province, where Ikoma Takatoshi was ordered to remain under house arrest for over 20 years. Furthermore, in 1659 his son and heir Ikoma Takakiyo was forced to divide 2000 koku of his inheritance to a younger brother, and thus the clan lost its status as a daimyō clan, and was reduced to the ranks of the hatamoto.

Forced to reside in Edo, the Ikoma administered their territory as absentee landlords through local administrator; however, the high taxation and tyranny of the administrators led to repeated peasant uprisings and eventually a direct appeal by the peasants to the government, especially in 1677. In 1780, shōgun Tokugawa Ieharu allowed the head of the clan to visit his holdings under the sankin-kōtai system.

During the Boshin War, the Ikoma clan initially signed the Ōuetsu Reppan Dōmei agreement, but quickly switched sides on the approach of the forces of pro-Imperial Shinjō Domain. The new Meiji government rewarded the Ikoma for their quick defection from the Ōuetsu Reppan Dōmei in 1868 with an increase in revenues to 15,200 koku, restoring the clan to the ranks of the daimyo after 250 years. The new Yashima Domain was rewarded a further 1,000 koku in 1869, with control of 47 villages in what became Yuri District, Akita.

However, with the abolition of the han system in July 1871, Yashima Domain was absorbed into Akita Prefecture. In 1884, the adopted son of the final daimyo was granted the title of baron (danshaku) in the kazoku peerage.

== List of daimyōs ==
- Ikoma clan (tozama) 1640–1658; 1868–1871

#	Name	Tenure	Courtesy title	Court Rank	kokudaka
1	Ikoma Takatoshi (生駒高俊)	1640–1658	Sanuki-no-kami (讃岐の上)	Lower 4th (従四位下)	10,000 koku
2	Ikoma Chikayuki (生駒親敬)	1868–1871	Sanuki-no-kami (讃岐の上)	Lower 5th (従五位下)	15,200 → 16,200 koku
