= Ikoma Masatoshi =

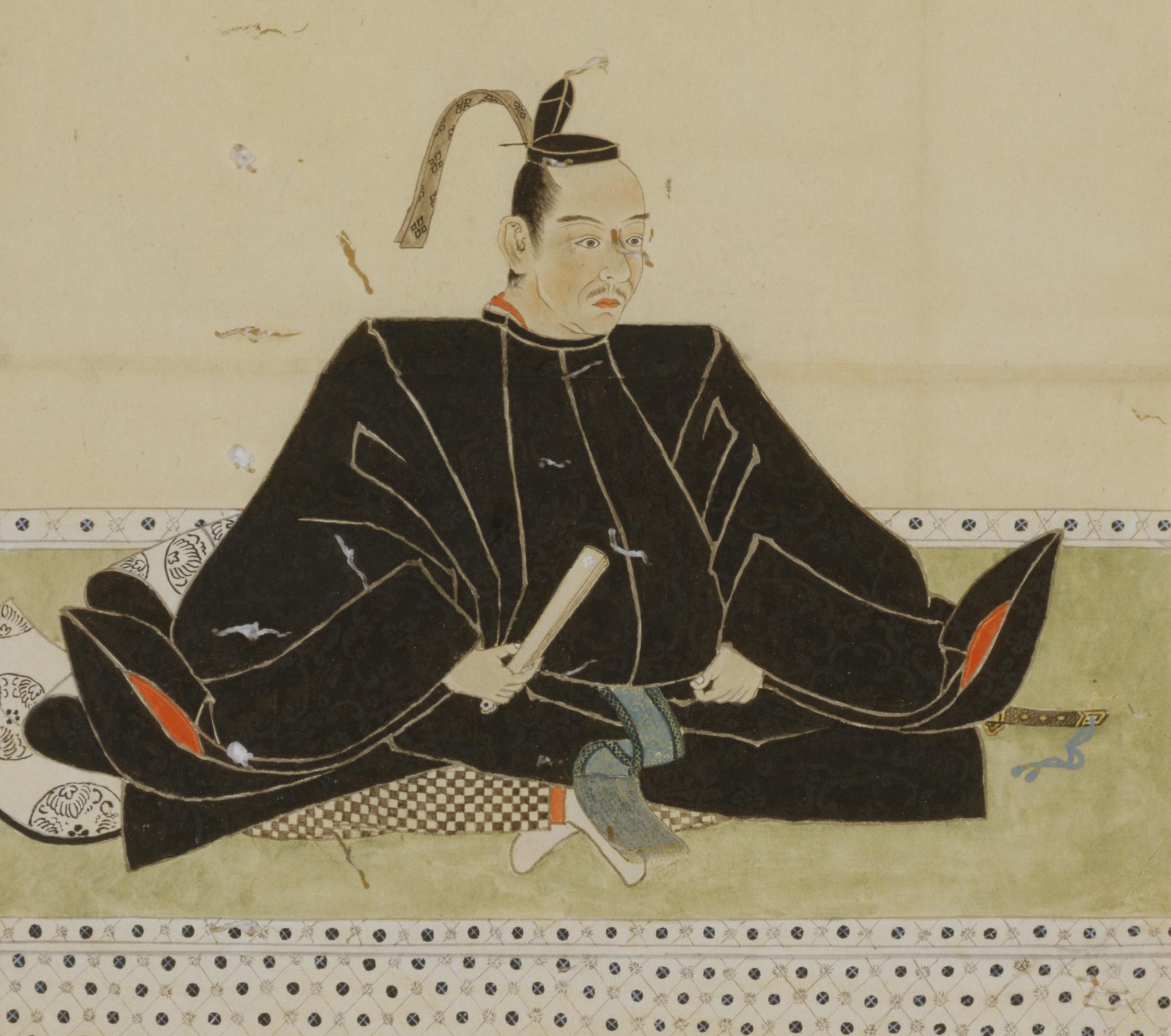
Ikoma Masatoshi

Ikoma Masatoshi (生駒 正俊, 1586 – July 23, 1621) was a Japanese samurai of the late Azuchi–Momoyama period, who lived into the early Edo period. He was also the daimyō of the Takamatsu Domain.

Masatoshi fought at the Siege of Osaka in 1614, commanding a detached force on the side of the Tokugawa.

After his death, he was succeeded as family head by his son, Takatoshi.

Preceded by Ikoma Kazumasa	3rd Daimyō of Takamatsu (Ikoma); 1610–1621	Succeeded by Ikoma Takatoshi
