= Ikoma Ienaga =

Japanese samurai

Ikoma Ienaga (生駒 家長; died 1607) was a Japanese samurai of the Sengoku period through early Edo period, who served the Oda clan. He is Nobunaga's stable master (umamawari, 馬廻).

He served in a number of Nobunaga's battles, including Moribe (1561) and Anegawa (1570). After Nobunaga's death, he served Toyotomi Hideyoshi. He was the brother of Kitsuno, Oda Nobunaga's concubine.
