= Ikoma Takatoshi =

Japanese daimyō

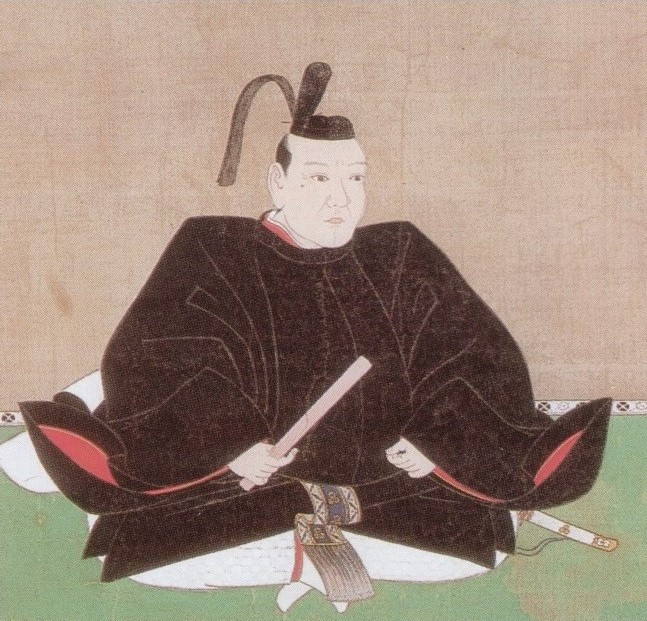
Ikoma Takatoshi

Ikoma Takatoshi (生駒 高俊; 1611 – August 4, 1659) was a Japanese daimyō of the early Edo period, who ruled the Takamatsu Domain. He was the son-in-law of Doi Toshikatsu.

Takatoshi lost rulership of the Takamatsu domain due to an uprising within the fief. The shogunate attaindered his domain, and transferred him to the much smaller Yashima Domain in Dewa Province.

Preceded by Ikoma Masatoshi	4th Daimyō of Takamatsu (Ikoma); 1621–1640	Succeeded by Matsudaira Yorishige
Preceded by none	1st Daimyō of Yashima (Ikoma); 1640–1658	Succeeded by Ikoma Chikayuki
