= Ikoma Chikamasa =

Japanese daimyō (1526–1603)

- 生駒 親正
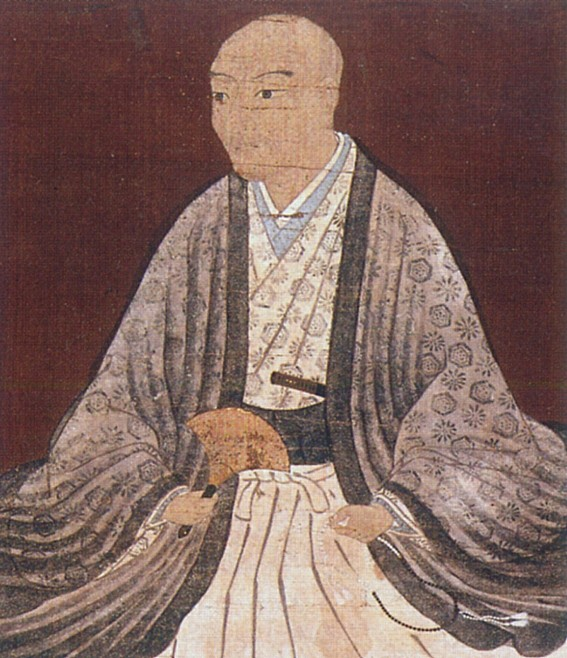

Lord of Takamatsu
- In office 1570–1600
- Preceded by: Ikoma Chikashige
- Succeeded by: Ikoma Kazumasa

Personal details
- Born: 1526
- Died: March 25, 1603 (aged 76–77) Takamatsu Castle (Sanuki)

Military service
- Allegiance: Oda clan Toyotomi clan Western Army
- Rank: Daimyo, chūrō
- Unit: Ikoma clan
- Commands: Takamatsu Castle
- Battles/wars: Siege of Inabayama; Ishiyama Hongan-ji War; Battle of Nagashino; Battle of Yamazaki; Battle of Shizugatake; Siege of Odawara; Battle of Bunroku; Sekigahara campaign

Ikoma Chikamasa (生駒 親正; 1526 – March 25, 1603) was a Japanese daimyō during the Azuchi-Momoyama and Edo periods around the turn of the 17th century. His father was Ikoma Chikashige. Chikamasa was appointed one of the san-chūrō (three arbiters) by Toyotomi Hideyoshi, along with Horio Yoshiharu and Nakamura Kazuuji.

== Military life ==
=== Service under Nobunaga ===
In 1566, he became a retainer of Oda Nobunaga when he attacked Mino Province. He worked under Hashiba Hideyoshi from then on, and was involved in various battles such as the Battle of Nagashino 1575 and also Ishiyama Hongan-ji War, in the battle against the Saika party at Kii Province in 1577.

=== Service under Hideyoshi ===
He served Toyotomi Hideyoshi after Nobunaga died, and was active in several battles such as the Battle of Yamazaki 1582, the Battle of Shizugatake 1583, the Siege of Odawara 1590, and the Battle of Bunroku 1592. He was given lands in Sanuki Province yielding 171,800 koku of rice because of his service. In Hideyoshi's last years, Ikoma Chikamasa, Nakamura Kazuuji, and Horio Yoshiharu were appointed to the position of chūrō under Toyotomi.

=== Battle of Sekigahara ===
In 1600 at the Battle of Sekigahara, Chikamasa was part of Ishida Mitsunari's force while his son, Ikoma Kazumasa was part of Tokugawa Ieyasu's force. Chikamasa remained at Sanuki and sent his retainers, Onoki Shigekatsu, in his stead to attack Tanabe castle in Tango Province. He chose this strategy to preserve the Ikoma clan regardless of which side prevailed. Because Kazumasa fought in Ieyasu's force, Ieyasu allowed Chikamasa to rule his existing domain after the battle, but Chikamasa took responsibility for fighting on the losing side by transferring the headship of the family to Kazumasa.

== Death ==
After Sekigahara, Chikamasa became a priest and withdrew to Mount Kōya. He was soon permitted to return to Sanuki Province. In 1603, he died in Takamatsu castle.

Preceded by none	Daimyō of Takamatsu; 1587–1600	Succeeded by Ikoma Kazumasa
