= Takamatsu Castle (Sanuki) =

Castle in Takamatsu, Kagawa prefecture, Japan

- 高松城
- Takamatsu, Kagawa Prefecture, Japan
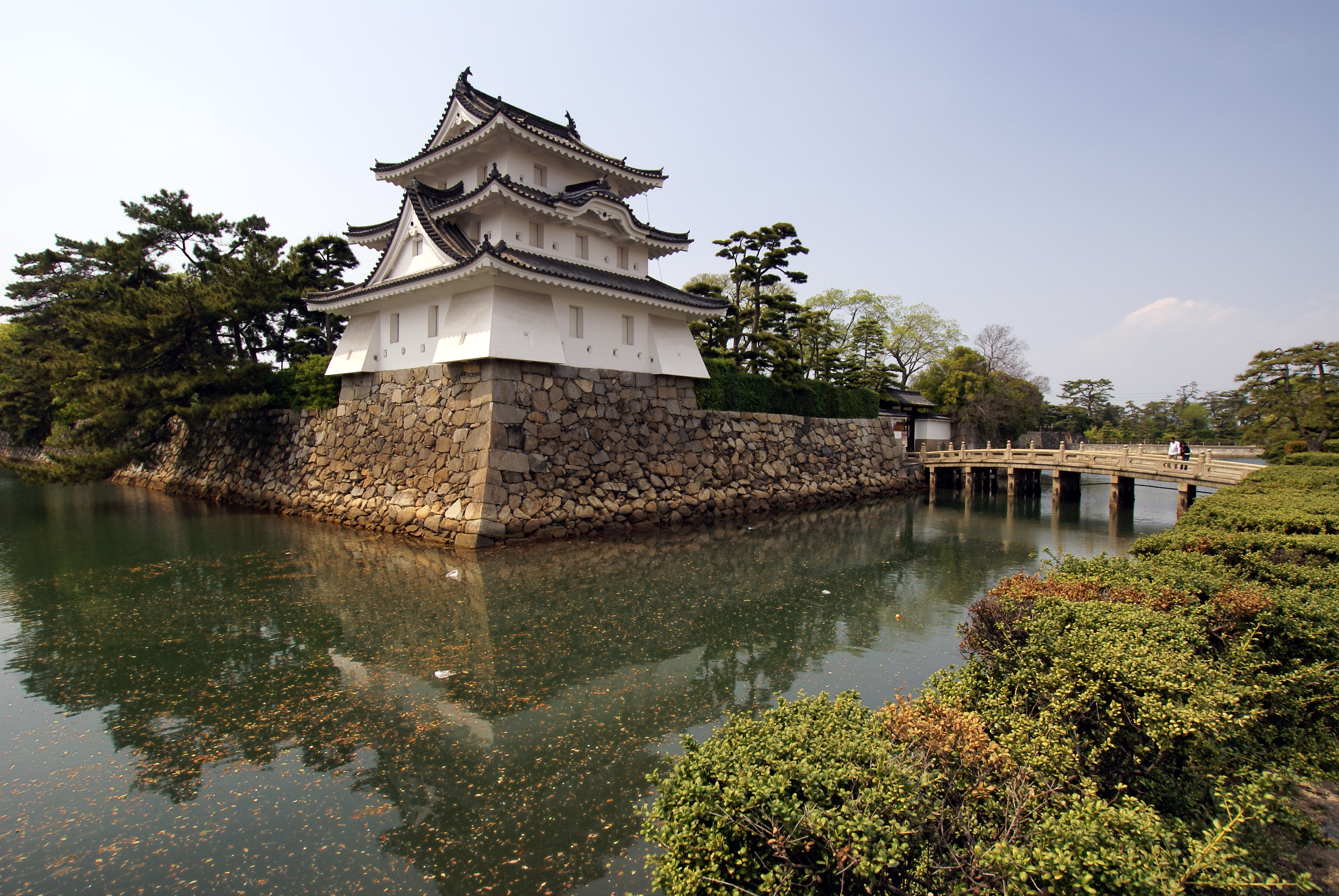
- Ushitora tower (yagura)

Site information
- Type: Azuchi-Momoyama castle
- Controlled by: Ikoma clan (until 1640); Matsudaira clan (1642-1869)
- Open to the public: Tamamo Park
- Condition: Archaeological and designated national historical site; castle ruins, a gate and three yagura remain.
- Website: Tamamo Park (Ruins of Takamatsu Castle)

Location
- Coordinates: 34°21′0.2″N 134°3′1.4″E
- Area: 79,587 km^{2} (originally 660,000 km^{2})

Site history
- Built: 1588
- Built by: Ikoma Chikamasa
- In use: 1588-1874
- Materials: Wood, stone, plaster

Takamatsu Castle (高松城, Takamatsu-jō) is a Japanese castle located in central Takamatsu, Kagawa Prefecture, on the island of Shikoku, Japan. It is also called Tamamo Castle (玉藻城, Tamamo-jō), literally "seaweed castle," for its seawater moats. The castle was headquarters of the Takamatsu Domain, which ruled eastern Sanuki Province (modern-day Kagawa) from 1588 to 1869. It is now a park. The castle site has been a National Historic Site since 1955. This castle is one of three in Japan to use seawater moats, along with Imabari Castle in Ehime Prefecture and Nakatsu Castle in Ōita Prefecture.

== History ==
Takamatsu Castle is located on the coast of the Seto Inland Sea, in front of Takamatsu port. Following the conquest of Shikoku during the Sengoku period by the forces of Toyotomi Hideyoshi, he assigned his general Ikoma Chikamasa as ruler of all of Sanuki. This area was of critical strategic importance, as the Chugoku region on the opposite shores of Honshu was controlled by the Mōri and their allies, all of whom were enemies of the Toyotomi government, and it was economically critical to keep the sea lanes open. The Ikoma first established their stronghold at Hiketa Castle, but it was inconveniently located near the eastern border of Sanuki, and therefore in 1588 Ikoma Chikamasa selected a more central location for a new castle, which was completed by 1590.

Takamatsu Castle was a "sea castle" in that was situated directly on the coast, so that the ocean formed one side of its natural defenses. The castle covered an area of 400 by 200 meters. The inner bailey, which contained the three-story tenshu was only 50 by 20 meters, and could be reached only by bridge. It was surrounded by a concentric series of enclosures, each protected by stone walls, water moats and masugata-style compound gates. Due to the small size of the castle, the Ikoma clan used Marugame Castle as their primary stronghold for a time, but were forced to return to Takamatsu Castle after the Battle of Sekigahara in 1600 and the reduction in their territories by the Tokugawa shogunate. In 1640, the Ikoma were demoted and transferred to the much smaller Yashima Domain in Dewa Province. In 1642, the domain was awarded to a cadet branch of the Matsudaira clan from Shimodate Domain in Hitachi Province. The Matsudaira rebuilt Matsuyama Castle, adding a new five-story tenshu. The Matsudaira ruled from this location until the Meiji restoration.

In 1868, the castle was turned over to the Imperial Japanese Army, which used the grounds to 1874. The tenshu was destroyed in 1884 due to aging, and many other castle structures were demolished. The following year the castle was returned to the Matsudaira family, who sold off more of the grounds and rebuilt a luxurious villa in the inner ring. The castle was extensively damaged in air raids during World War II, and the Sakuragomon gate in the San-no-maru enclosure burned down (it was rebuilt in 2022). In 1947, under the former National Treasures Preservation Law, four surviving buildings, the Kita-no-Maru Tsukimi Yagura, the Kita-no-Maru Mizute Gomon, the Kita-no-Maru Watari Yagura, and the Higashi-No-Maru Ushitora Yagura were designated as national treasures. This designation was changed to that of National Important Cultural Properties in 1950 and the castle grounds opened to the public in 1955.

Takamatsu Castle was listed as one of Japan's Top 100 Castles by the Japan Castle Foundation in 2006.

In 2012, the Hiunkaku (former Matsudaira family Takamatsu villa) was designated as a National Important Cultural Property and the gardens of the villa were designated a National Place of Scenic Beauty in 2013.

The castle is a ten-minute walk from the JR Shikoku Takamatsu Station.

=== Important Cultural Properties ===
- Kita-no-maru Tsukimi Yagura and Nanmen Tsuzuki Yagura (two connected structures) (北之丸月見櫓) middle Edo Period (1676), designated an Important Cultural Property since 1947
- Kita-no-maru Mizute Gomon (北之丸水手御門), late Edo Period (1830-1867), designated since 1947
- Kita-no-Maru Watari Yagura (北之丸渡櫓), middle Edo Period (1676), designated since 1947
- Higashi-No-Maru Ushitora Yagura (東之丸艮櫓), middle Edo Period (1677), designated since 1947
- Hiunkaku Main Building (披雲閣（旧松平家高松別邸） 本館), built in 1917, designated since 2012
- Hiunkaku Kura Warehouse (披雲閣（旧松平家高松別邸） 本館付倉庫), built in 1917, designated since 2012
- Hiunkaku Warehouse (披雲閣（旧松平家高松別邸） 倉庫), built in 1926, designated since 2012

== Gallery ==
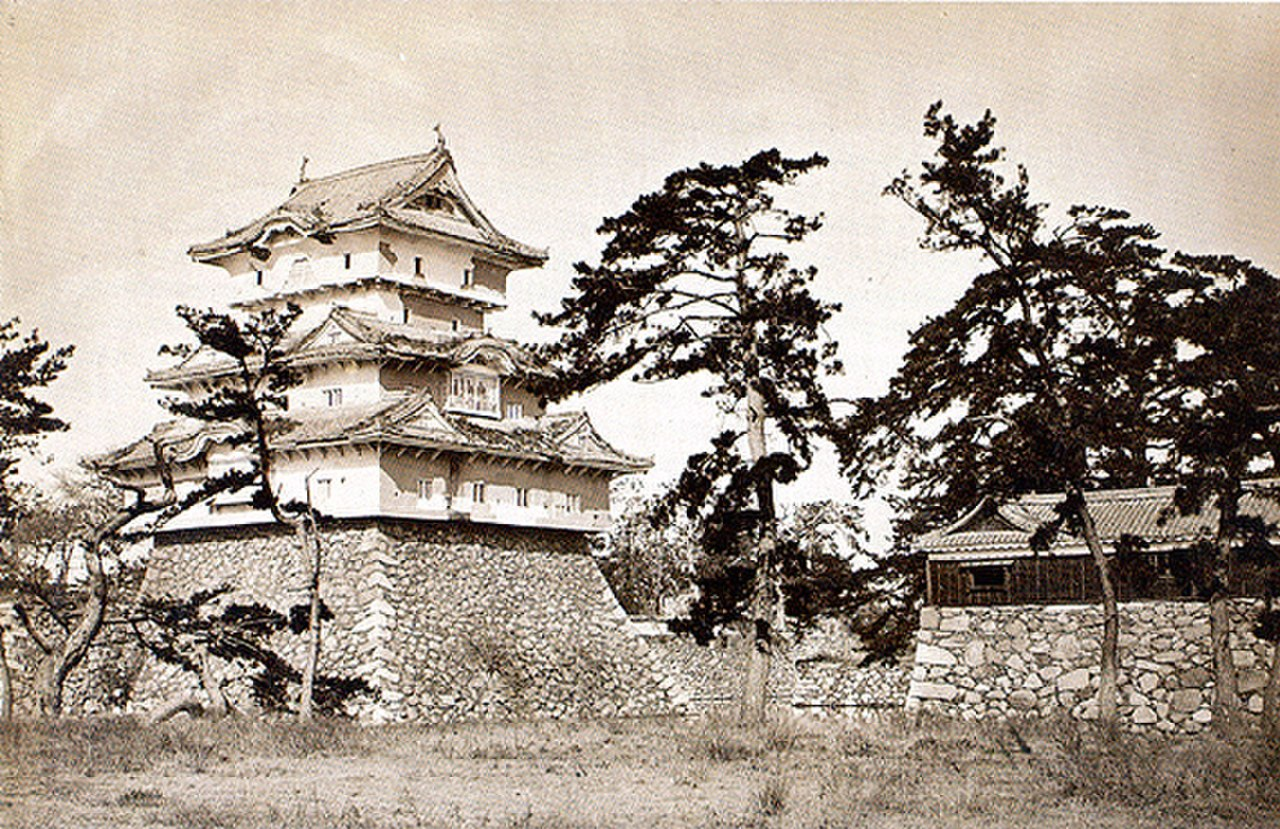
Main keep (Tenshu) in 1882, before it was dismantled

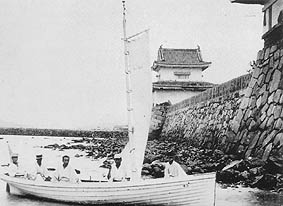
Boat near the Shika tower (yagura), date unknown

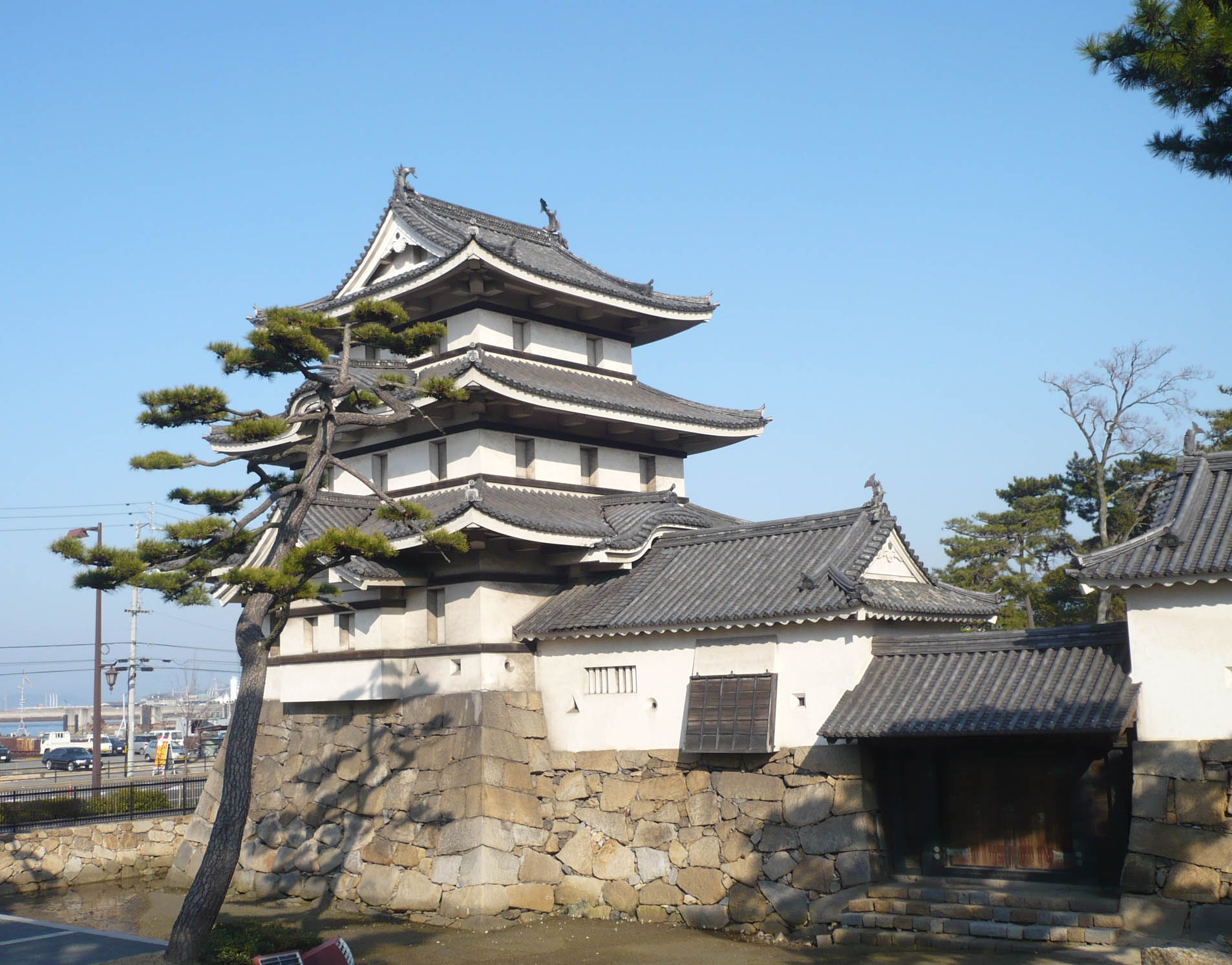
Ushitora tower

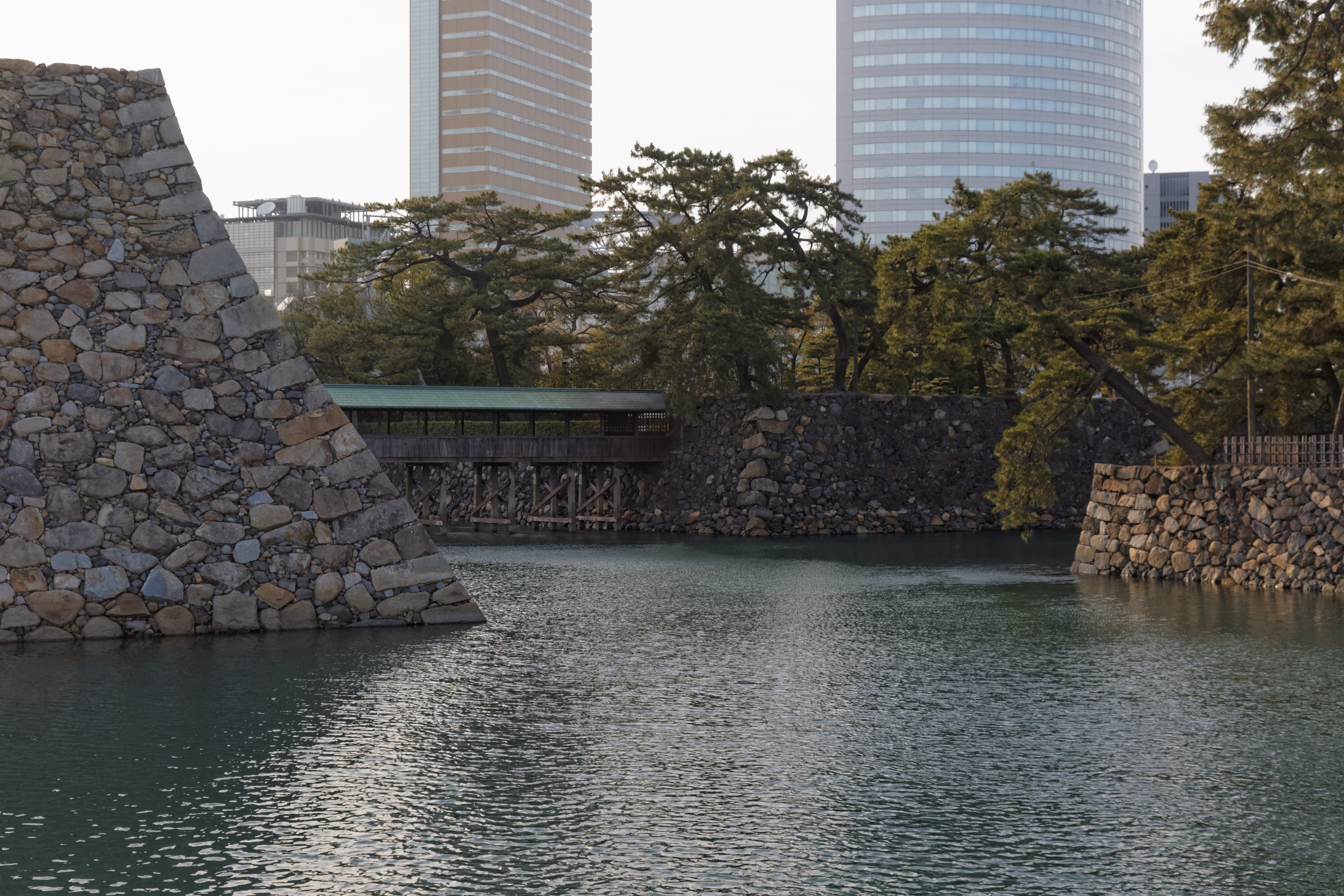
Saya bridge

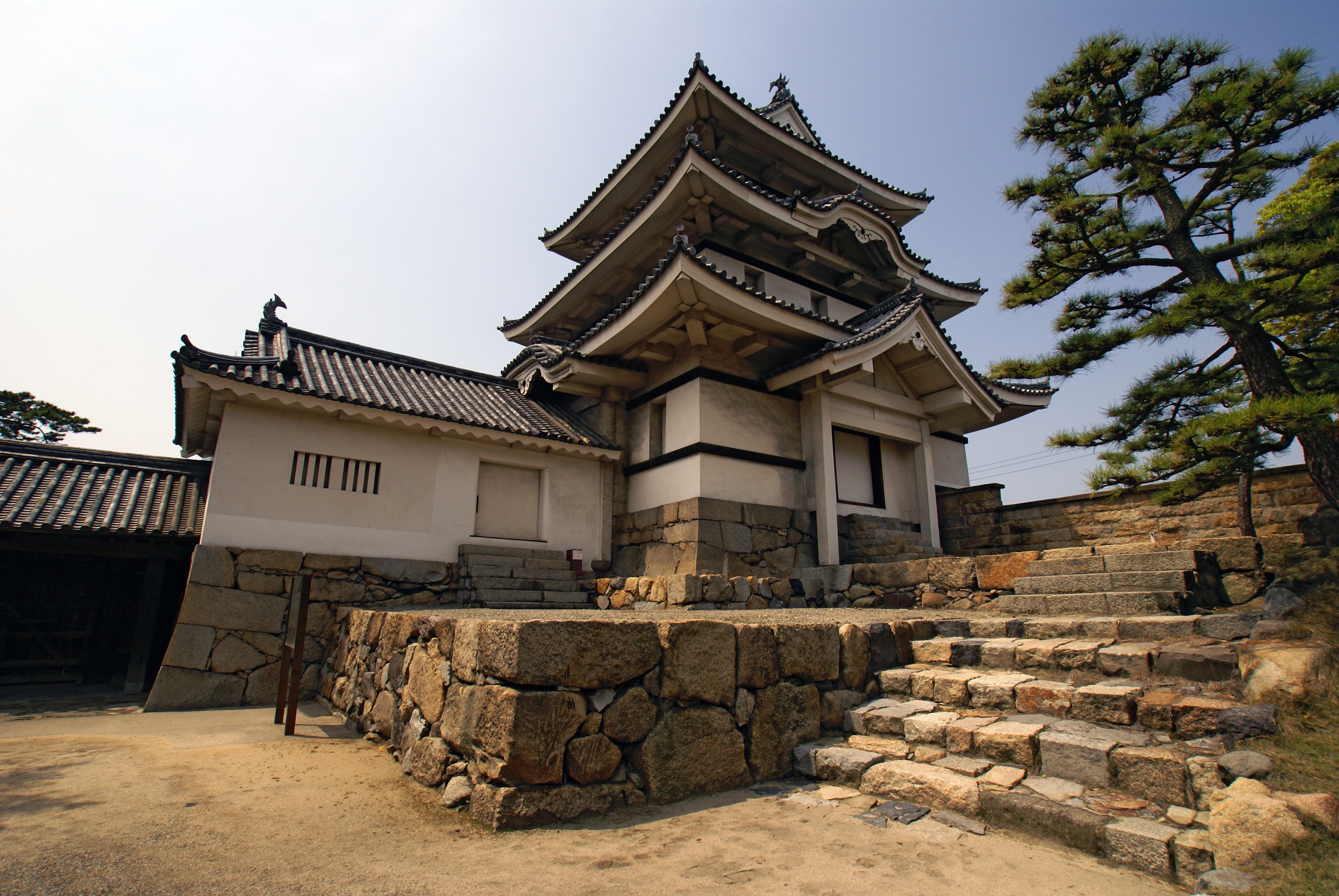
Tsukimi tower and Mizunote Gomon gate

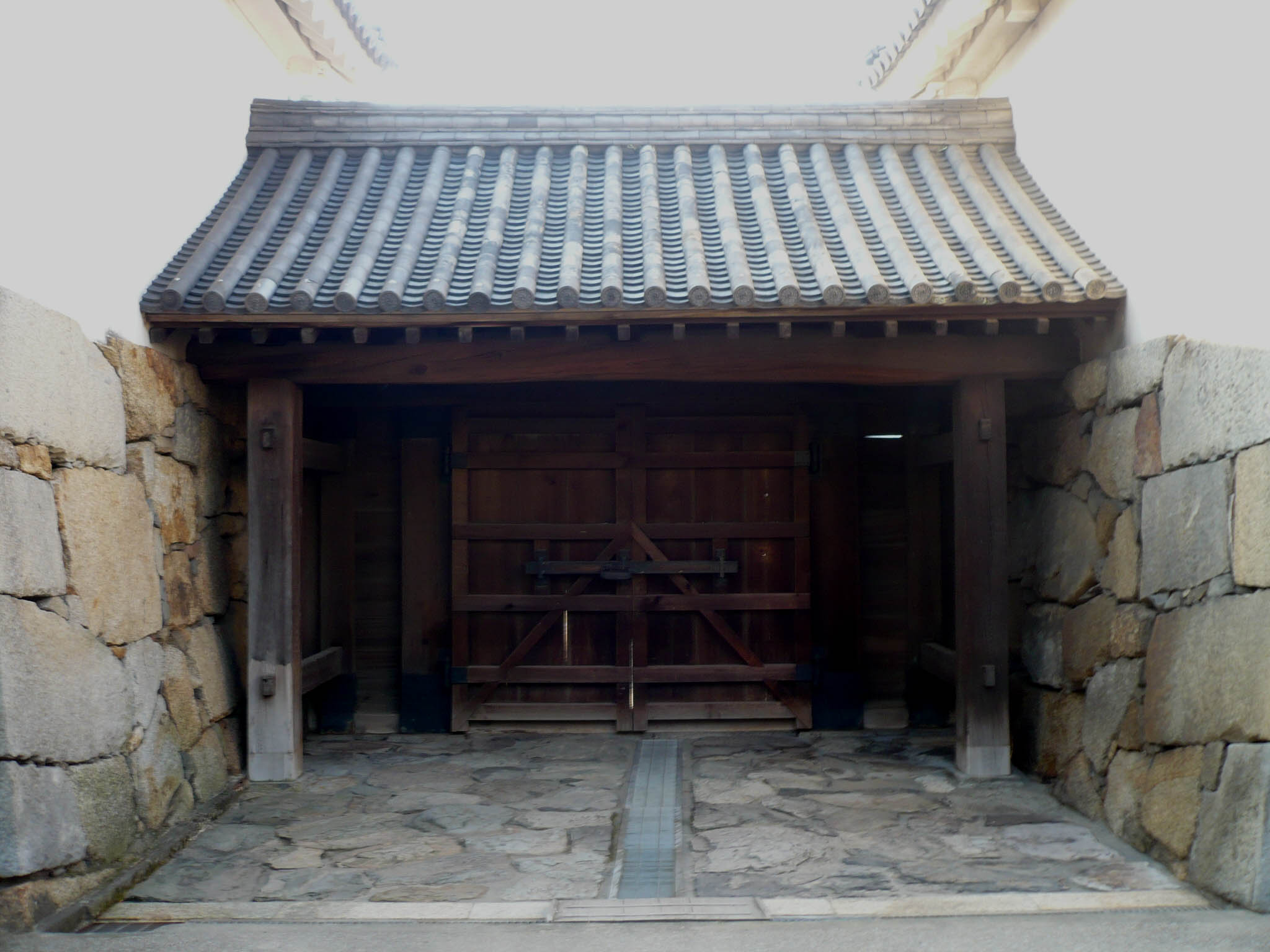
Mizunote Gomon gate

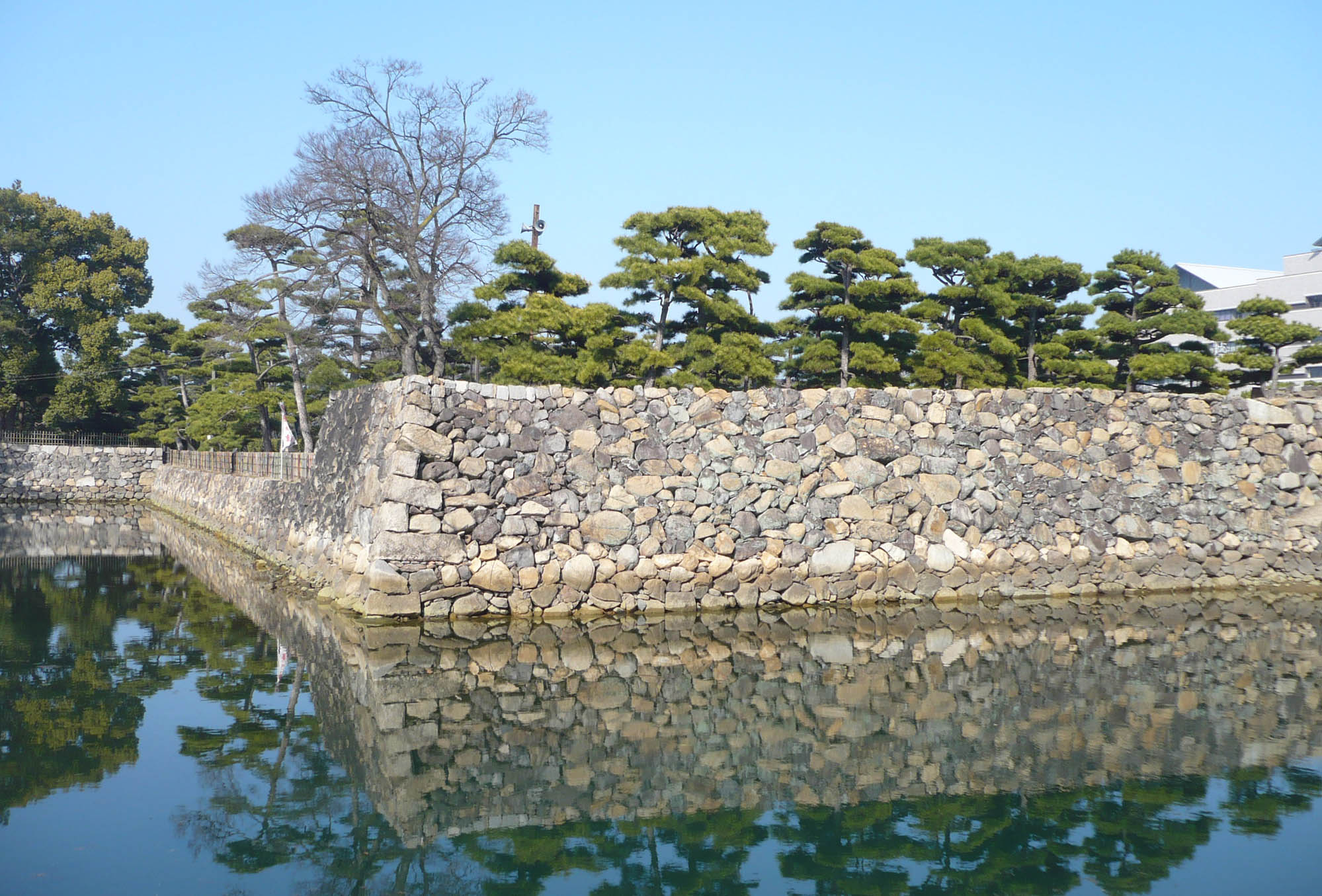
Stone wall of Sannomaru compound

== See also ==
- List of Historic Sites of Japan (Kagawa)
- List of Places of Scenic Beauty of Japan (Kagawa)

== Literature ==
- Benesch, Oleg and Ran Zwigenberg (2019). Japan's Castles: Citadels of Modernity in War and Peace. Cambridge: Cambridge University Press. p. 374. ISBN 9781108481946.
- De Lange, William (2021). An Encyclopedia of Japanese Castles. Groningen: Toyo Press. pp. 600 pages. ISBN 978-9492722300.
