= Matsudaira Yorihiro (Takamatsu) =

Japanese daimyo (1798–1842)

- Lord of Takamatsu
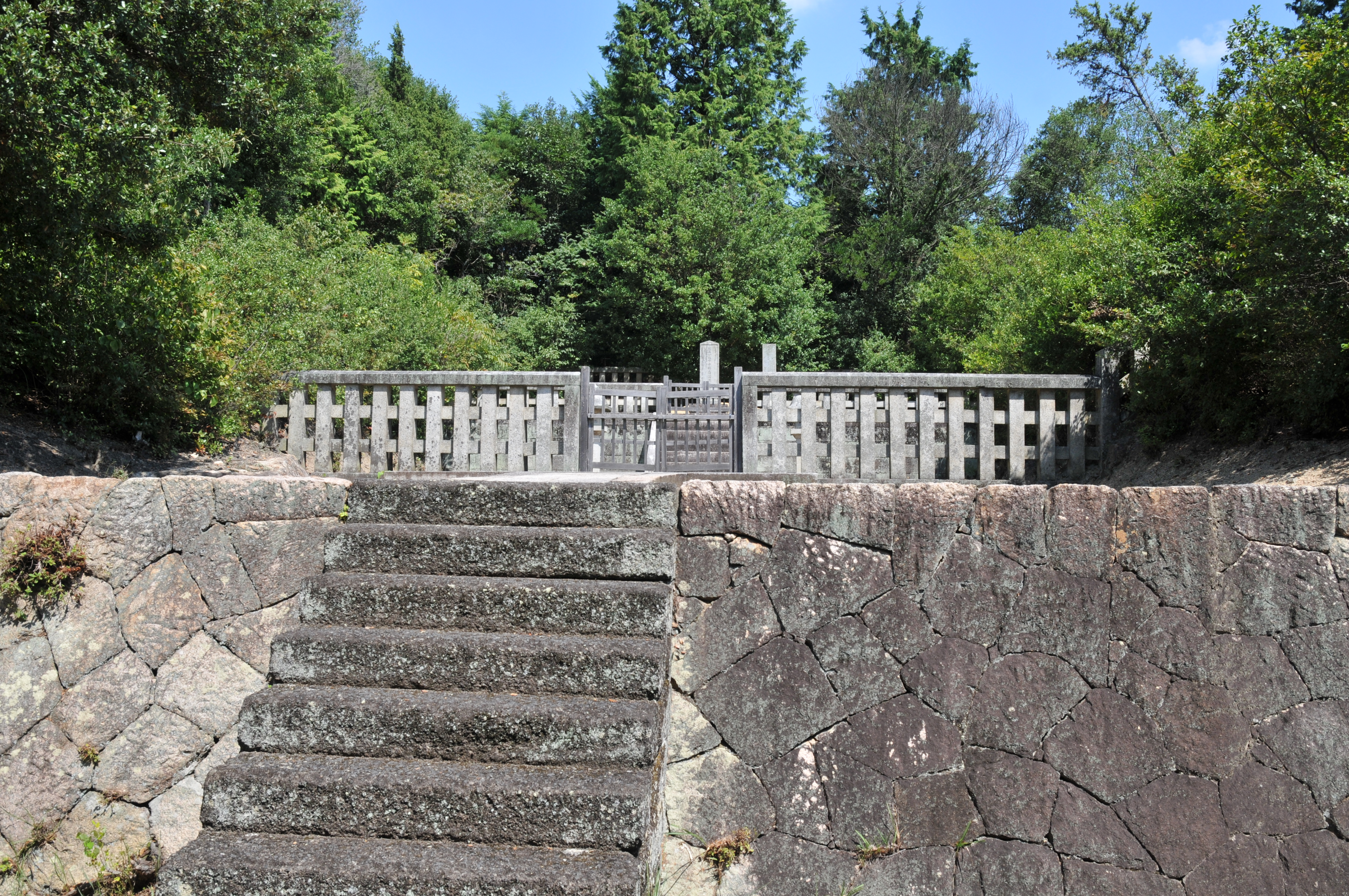
- Grave of Matsudaira Yorihiro, Reishiji cemetery of Matsudaira family
- Reign: 1642–1673
- Predecessor: Matsudaira Yorinori
- Successor: Matsudaira Yoritane
- Issue: Ōkubo Tadanori

Matsudaira Yorihiro (松平頼恕; 1798–1842) was a Japanese daimyō of the late Edo period, who ruled as the ninth lord of the Takamatsu Domain.

Yorihiro ordered Mifuyu Tomoyasu, a scholar of Kokugaku (National Learning), to compile a book called Rekicho Yoki, and he presented it to the Imperial court.

One of Yorihiro's sons was Ōkubo Tadanori. His descendant Yorihiro Matsudaira, named after him, was a notable figure of Japanese Scouting and recipient of the Bronze Wolf.

Preceded by Matsudaira Yorinori	1st Daimyō of Takamatsu (Mito-Matsudaira); 1642–1673	Succeeded by Matsudaira Yoritane
