= Kitsuno =

Concubine of Japanese daimyo Oda Nobunaga

Kitsuno (生駒 吉乃, Ikoma Kitsuno; 1528 (Note: There is a theory that she was born in 1538.) – 31 May 1566) was a Japanese woman from the Sengoku period to the Azuchi–Momoyama period. She was a concubine of Oda Nobunaga, a Sengoku Daimyō of the Owari Province.

Her posthumous Buddhist name is Kyūan Keishō Daizenjō-ni (久菴桂昌大禅定尼).

== Name ==
The name of this woman, who was Nobunaga's concubine and the daughter of Ikoma Iemune, is unknown, as is the case with many women of this period. She is merely listed as a woman in the family tree and her official name has not been passed down to the Ikoma family. She is generally known as Kitsuno (吉乃), but this name was popularised by Bukō Yawa (Note: Bukō Yawa and Bukō Yawa Shūi are family historical documents that are said to be modern translations of the contents of an ancient document called the Maeno family archives, which were found in a broken storehouse of the Maeno family, an old family in Kōnan City, after Isewan Typhoon in 1959, and published as a book. Some writers and TV stations were attracted to the book because of its interesting story, and a number of novels and dramas were produced, but from the outset there were suspicions that the book was a forgery. However, many historical researchers referred to the book at the time, and Kōnan City and neighbouring municipalities organised study groups on the book as local history and used it for tourism and regional development. The Ikoma family claims that these are novels because Yoshida Tatsumo, who says he translated them into modern languages, interviewed the Ikoma family before publication, saying he was writing a novel. As the Yoshida side has not released the original documents, no clear conclusion has been reached after years of authenticity disputes. However, there is a tacit understanding among historical researchers that the document should not be used.) and does not appear in any of the Ikoma family archives or other historical documents. In recent years, rumours have circulated on the internet and elsewhere that the Ikoma family called her Rui (類) or Orui (お類), but these stories were written in Bukō Yawa, and there is no such mention in the ancient documents left by the Ikoma family.

Documents in the Ikoma family from the early to the end of the Edo period list her as Keishō (桂昌) or Keishō-ni (桂昌尼), which seems to be taken from part of her commandment name, and from the Taisho era to the pre-war period, the Ikoma family called her Kyūan (久菴) or Kyūan-san (久菴さん), which is also taken from part of her commandment name.

== Life ==
She was born as the eldest daughter of Ikoma Iemune, a local clan of Koori, Niwa County, Owari Province (present Kōnan, Aichi Prefecture), who served the Oda clan.

Kitsuno was married once before becoming Nobunaga's concubine. The Maeno family documents, Bukō Yawa and Bukō Yawa Shūi, state that she first married Dota Yaheiji, a Gōzoku of Mino Province, who was killed in action. However, he is only mentioned in the Ikoma family tree as a certain Yaheiji, and for reasons unknown, his family name is not given and his origins are unclear. (Note: The Ikoma family speculates that he was somehow inconvenient to the Oda clan and was therefore ambiguous.) After the loss of her husband, Kitsuno returned to her family's home, Ikoma mansion. It was there that she met Oda Nobunaga.

As Nobunaga's concubine, she bore his heir Nobutada, his second son Nobukatsu and his eldest daughter Tokuhime for three consecutive years from 1557. According to one theory, Nobutada was adopted as Nobunaga's legitimate son by his legal wife, Nōhime, who had no children with Nobunaga. Nobukatsu was adopted by the Kitabatake clan to avoid a succession struggle with Nobutada, while Tokuhime married Matsudaira Nobuyasu, the legitimate son of Tokugawa Ieyasu, an ally of Nobunaga.

She is said to have not recover from the postpartum, and died in 1566. If she was born in 1528, she would have died at the age of 39, and in 1538, she would have died at the age of 29.

After her death, she was given the commandment name Kyūan Keishō Daizenjō-ni (久菴桂昌大禅定尼), and her family temple, Kyūshō-ji (久昌寺), received 660 koku from Nobunaga as an incense fee. Kyūshō-ji was rebuilt in 1566 after Nobunaga ordered it to be her family temple. (Note: The temple was originally founded in 1384 during the Muromachi period and renamed Kūshō-ji after Kitsuno's commandment name.) Kyūshō-ji was also protected by Toyotomi Hideyoshi and memorial services were held by the Kashiwabara clan, which was descended from the Oda clan (Nobukatsu), during the Edo period. Since then, it has been maintained by the Ikoma family, Kitsuno's birthplace, as a family temple for generations, but it became difficult due to the age of the building and costs, and was closed in 2022 after Kōnan City concluded that it would not provide a budget to maintain the temple.

Her other family temple, Sofuku-ji in Gifu Prefecture, became the family temple of the Oda family after Kitsuno's tablets were enshrined there, and the tombs of Nobunaga and Nobutada were also built by Nobunaga's concubine Onabe no Kata.

== Legend of Nobunaga's beloved ==
Kitsuno was the beloved of Nobunaga in Bukō Yawa. According to the book, she and Nobunaga met at the Ikoma family mansion. At the time, the Ikoma family belonged to Oda Nobukiyo, lord of Inuyama Castle, but also did business as a samurai merchant, and various people from different provinces came to their mansion and gathered a lot of information. Nobunaga, who valued the gathering of information above all else, had noticed the wealth and intelligence of the Ikoma family and had visited their mansion many times. It was during one of these visits that Nobunaga met Kitsuno and fell in love at first sight. He frequented the Ikoma residence and eventually decided to take her as his concubine.

In Bukō Yawa, Nobunaga built a palace in Komakiyama Castle, which he built as a base for his Mino campaign, to welcome Kitsuno. When Nobunaga learnt that Kitsuno was unwell, he went to the Ikoma residence, placed her in a palanquin and personally escorted her to Komakiyama Castle. Nobunaga visited her frequently, but her illness did not improve and she died at the age of 39 in 1566, a year after moving to Komakiyama Castle. When Kitsuno died, Nobunaga is said to have wept for three days and three nights without being seen. These episodes made Ikoma Kitsuno famous as 'the woman most loved by Nobunaga'.

Bukō Yawa also states that at Ikoma Mansion, where Nobunaga and Kitsuno met, there were various other encounters that had a great impact on later generations. For example, it is said that it was here that Hachisuka Koroku, who was related to the Ikoma family, met Hashiba Hideyoshi, who he later served. There is also an anecdote that it was Kitsuno who introduced Hideyoshi to Nobunaga.

However, there is no similar description in the Ikoma family archives that provided information to Bukō Yawa authors, nor in other historical documents, and either episodes are considered to be later creations.

Meanwhile, a document from Kyūshō-ji, Kitsuno's family temple, mentions that Nobunaga climbed the turret of Komakiyama Castle and wept as he gazed into the smoke of her cremation.
