= Takamatsu Domain =

Administrative division in Japan during the Edo period (1587–1871)

Takamatsu Domain 高松藩
- Domain of Japan
- 1641–1871
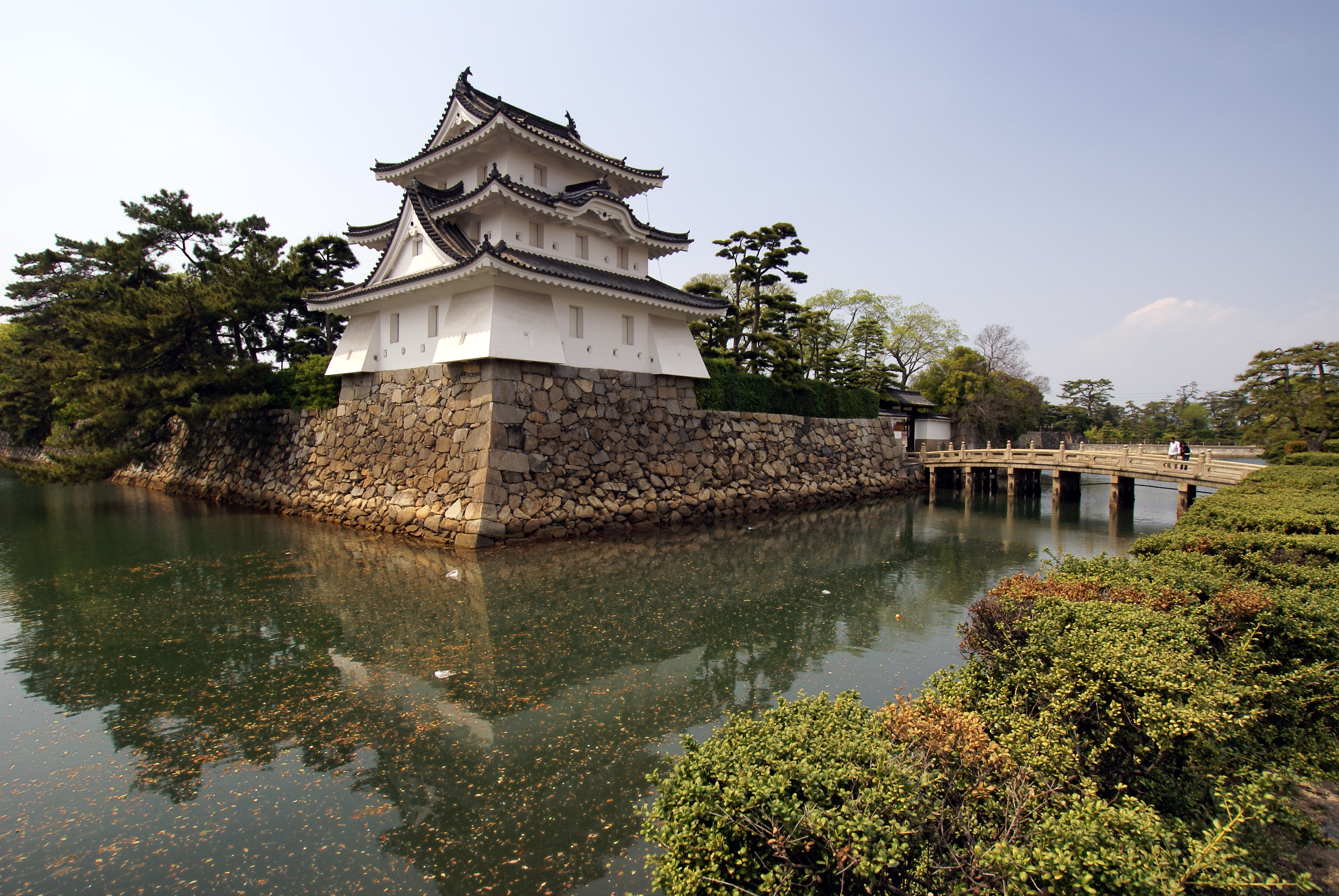
- Takamatsu Castle in Takamatsu, Kagawa

- Flag Mon of the Matsudaira clan
- Capital: Takamatsu Castle
- Area
  - Coordinates: 34°21′0.2″N 134°3′1.4″E
- Historical era: Edo period
  - Established: 1641
  - Abolition of the han system: 1871
- Contained within
  - Province: Sanuki
- Today part of: Kagawa Prefecture

Location of Takamatsu Castle
Takamatsu Domain (Japan)

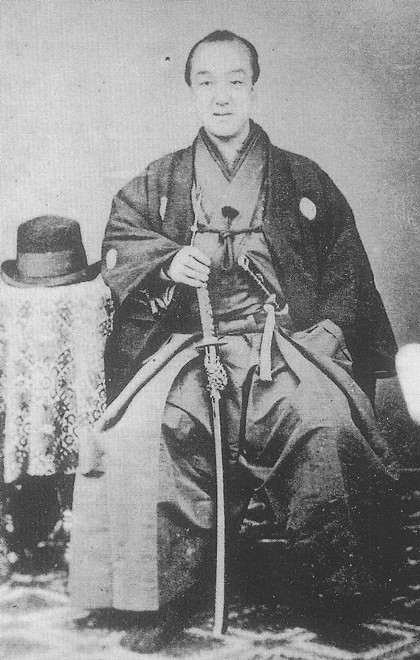
Matsudaira Yoritoshi. pre-1903

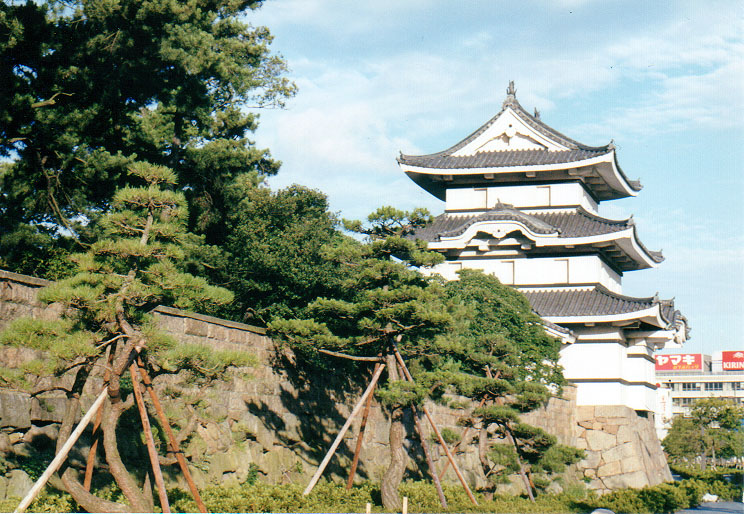
Takamatsu Castle Tsukimi Yagura

Takamatsu Domain (高松藩, Takamatsu-han) was a feudal domain under the Tokugawa shogunate of Edo period Japan, in what is now Kagawa Prefecture on the island of Shikoku. It was centered around Takamatsu Castle, and was ruled throughout much of its history by a cadet branch of the Shinpan Matsudaira clan. Takamatsu Domain was dissolved in the abolition of the han system in 1871 and is now part of Kagawa Prefecture.

== History ==
In 1587, after Toyotomi Hideyoshi's conquest of Shikoku, he assigned Sanuki Province to his general Ikoma Chikamasa with a kokudaka of 126,200 koku (later raised to 173,000 koku). Chikamasa's son Ikoma Kazumasa sided with Tokugawa Ieyasu's Eastern Army in the Battle of Sekigahara in 1600, so he was confirmed in his holdings with the establishment of the Tokugawa shogunate. However, in 1640, during the tenure of Ikoma Takatoshi, the fourth daimyō, the clan was demoted to Yashima Domain in Dewa Province due to the "Ikoma Disturbance".

In 1642, Matsudaira Yorishige, the eldest son of Tokugawa Yorifusa, of Mito Domain, and daimyō of Shimodate Domain in Hitachi Province was transferred to Takamatsu Castle and given a fief of 120,000 koku, in eastern Sanuki. It is said that Yorishige was given this position at the express request of his cousin, Shogun Tokugawa Iemitsu, with whom he was on very good terms. Although they were cousins, Yorishige was allowed free access to the Shogun's private chambers in Edo Castle and he was given the honor of being seated (along with the Ii clan and the Aizu Matsudaira clans closest to the shogun during official councils. This allowed him to be able to listen to the political reports of the chief minister, and although prohibited from giving publicly giving opinions or intervening in politics, made him a major political figure within the Tokugawa shogunate. The location of Takamatsu was of great strategic importance and allowed Matsudaira Yorishige to monitor the movements of the domains in the western part of Japan on behalf of the shogunate. Thus, although the Takamatsu-Matsudaira family was a cadet branch family of the Mito-Tokugawa family, but they were not in a position to receive instructions from the Mito Domain and were highly independent. However, the domains remained bound closely together. Tokugawa Mitsukuni, the second daimyō of Mito appointed Yorishige's second son as his heir, and sent his own son, Yoritsuna, to succeed Takamatsu Domain. This "exchange of heirs" took place several times over the domain's history, resulting in the last Shogun, Tokugawa Yoshinobu being a direct descendant of Matsudaira Yorishige.

The Matsudaira rulers of Takamatsu placed great emphasis on land improvement through building reservoirs, and reclaiming land along the coastline to develop new rice fields and salt fields. They also diverted the flow of the Koto River, which used to run through the center of Takamatsu, to the west for irrigation purposes and improved the water supply for Takamatsu Castle. The domain also encouraged production of lacquerware and pottery as local industries. The han school, Kodokan, produced numerous scholarly figures in the Edo Period, including Hiraga Gennai. Many of the Matsudaira daimyō excelled in academics, poetry, and the Japanese tea ceremony. Some gave lectures on Neo-Confucianism to the shogun. The 5th daimyō Matsudaira Yoriyasu, had a medicinal herb garden (now Ritsurin Park) built in line with Shogun Tokugawa Yoshimune's policy of encouraging research into domestic production of medicines and agricultural products. In addition, he developed the manufacturing technology for "Sanuki wasanbon" sugar, which is still one of Kagawa's specialty products. The ninth daimyō, Matsudaira Yoritsugu, developed Japan's largest salt field on the beach of Sakaide. During the Edo period, the Takamatsu Domain was the largest producer of white sugar and salt in Japan.

During the Bakumatsu period, Mito Domain came out strongly in support of the Sonnō jōi movement, placing it at odds with the shogunate and also politically with Takamatsu Domain. In addition the two domains were at odds during the succession issue over the successor to Shogun Tokugawa Iesada, and the bad relations between Takamatsu and Mito continued for over a hundred years to 1974 when the two cities officially reconciled. During the Battle of Toba-Fushimi in the Boshin War, Takamatsu Domain supported the shogunate and was initially labelled an "enemy of the court". A punitive force led by Tosa Domain and supported by Marugame and Tadotsu Domains was sent attack Takamatsu, but Tokushima Domain was reluctant and encouraged Takamatsu to defect. As a result, Matsudaira Yoritsuna was forced to retire and was placed under house arrest in Edo and two chief karō, Oga Mataemon and Obu Hyōgo, were ordered to commit seppuku, and the domain ordered to pay 120,000 ryō to the Meiji government. However, there was much anti-government sentiment in the domain, and in 1871 with the abolition of the han system, the domain's territory was initially merged with Tokushima and Ehime Prefectures, only becoming part of Kagawa Prefecture on December 3, 1888. Matsudaira Yoritoshi, the final daimyō of Takamatsu was later granted the kazoku peerage title of Count (hakushaku)

== List of daimyō ==
#	Name	Tenure	Courtesy title	Court Rank	kokudaka
Ikoma clan, 1587–1640 (Tozama)
1	Ikoma Chikamasa (生駒親正)	1587–1600	Gagaku-no-kami (雅楽頭)	Junior 4th Rank, Lower Grade (従四位下)	173,000 koku
2	Ikoma Kazumasa (生駒一正)	1600–1610	Sanuki-no-kami (讃岐守)	Junior 5th Rank, Lower Grade (従五位下)	173,000 koku
3	Ikoma Masatoshi (生駒正俊)	1610–1621	Sanuki-no-kami (讃岐守)	Junior 4th Rank, Lower Grade (従四位下)	173,000 koku
4	Ikoma Takatoshi (生駒高俊)	1621- 1640	Iki-no-kami (壱岐守)	Junior 4th Rank, Lower Grade (従四位下)	173,000 koku
Matsudaira clan, 1642–1871 (Shinpan)
1	Matsudaira Yorishige (松平頼重)	1642–1673	Sanuki-no-kami (讃岐守)	Junior 4th Rank, Upper Grade (従四位上)	120,000 koku
2	Matsudaira Yoritsune (松平頼常)	1673–1704	Sanuki-no-kami (讃岐守)	Junior 4th Rank, Upper Grade (従四位上)	120,000 koku
3	Matsudaira Yoritoyo (松平頼豊)	1704–1735	Sakon'e-no-chujo (左近衛権中将)	Junior 4th Rank, Upper Grade (従四位上)	120,000 koku
4	Matsudaira Yoritake (松平頼桓)	1735–1739	Sanuki-no-kami (讃岐守); Jijū (侍従)	Junior 4th Rank, Upper Grade (従四位上)	120,000 koku
5	Matsudaira Yoritaka (松平頼恭)	1739–1771	Sakon'e-no-chujo (左近衛権中将)	Junior 4th Rank, Upper Grade (従四位上)	120,000 koku
6	Matsudaira Yorizane (松平頼真)	1771–1780	Sakon'e-no-chujo (左近衛権中将)	Junior 4th Rank, Lower Grade (従四位下)	120,000 koku
7	Matsudaira Yorioki (松平頼起)	1780–1792	Sakon'e-no-chujo (左近衛権中将)	Junior 4th Rank, Lower Grade (従四位下)	120,000 koku
8	Matsudaira Yorinori (松平頼儀)	1792–1821	Sakon'e-no-chujo (左近衛権中将)	Junior 4th Rank, Upper Grade (従四位上)	120,000 koku
9	Matsudaira Yorihiro (松平頼恕)	1821–1842	Sakon'e-no-chujo (左近衛権中将)	Senior 4th Rank, Lower Grade (正四位下)	120,000 koku
10	Matsudaira Yoritane (松平頼胤)	1842–1861	Sakon'e-no-chujo (左近衛権中将)	Senior 4th Rank, Lower Grade (正四位下)	120,000 koku
11	Matsudaira Yoritoshi (平頼聰)	1861–1871	Sanuki-no-kami (讃岐守)	Senior 2nd Rank (正二位)	120,000 koku

=== Simplified family tree (Mito-Tokugawa) ===
- Tokugawa Ieyasu, 1st Tokugawa shōgun (1543–1616; r. 1603–1605)
  - Tokugawa Yorifusa, 1st daimyō of Mito (1603–1661)
    - I. Matsudaira Yorishige, 1st daimyō of Takamatsu (cr. 1642) (1622–1695; daimyō of Takamatsu: 1642–1673)
      - Yoritoshi (1661–1687)
        - III. Yoritoyo, 3rd daimyō of Takamatsu (1680–1735; r. 1704–1735)
          - Tokugawa Munetaka, 4th daimyō of Mito (1705–1730)
            - Tokugawa Munemoto, 5th daimyō of Mito (1728–1766)
              - Tokugawa Harumori, 6th daimyō of Mito (1751–1805)
                - Tokugawa Harutoshi, 7th daimyō of Mito (1773–1816)
                  - IX. Matsudaira Yorihiro, 9th daimyō of Takamatsu (1798–1842; r. 1821–1842)
                    - XI. Yoritoshi, 11th daimyō of Takamatsu, 11th family head, 1st Count (1834–1903; daimyō: 1861–1869; Governor: 1869–1871; family head: 1861–1903; Count: cr. 1884)
                      - Yorinaga, 12th family head, 2nd Count (1874–1944; 12th family head and 2nd Count: 1903–1944)
                      - Captain Yutaka IJN (1879–1945)
                        - Yoriaki, 13th family head, 3rd Count (1909–1990; 13th family head: 1944–1990; 3rd Count: 1944–1947)
                          - Yoritake, 14th family head (born 1938; 14th family head: 1990–present)
                            - Yoriosa (born 1963)
      - Yoriyoshi (1667–1706)
        - Yorihiro, 1st head of the Daizen branch (1700–1737)
          - IV. Yoritake, 4th daimyō of Takamatsu (1720–1739; r. 1735–1739)
    - Tokugawa Mitsukuni, 2nd daimyō of Mito (1628–1701)
      - II. Matsudaira Yoritsune, 2nd daimyō of Takamatsu (1652–1704; r. 1673–1704)
    - Matsudaira Yorimoto, 1st daimyō of Nukada (1629–1693)
      - Yorisada, 1st daimyō of Moriyama (1664–1744)
        - V. Yoritaka, 5th daimyō of Takamatsu (1711–1771; r. 1739–1771)
          - VI. Yorizane, 6th daimyō of Takamatsu (1743–1780; r. 1771–1780)
            - VIII. Yorinori, 8th daimyō of Takamatsu (1775–1829; r. 1792–1821)
              - X. Yoritane, 10th daimyō of Takamatsu (1811–1877; r. 1842–1861)
          - VII. Yorioki, 7th daimyō of Takamatsu (1747–1792; r. 1780–1792)

== Holdings at the end of the Edo period ==
As with most domains in the han system, Takamatsu consisted of several discontinuous territories calculated to provide the assigned kokudaka, based on periodic cadastral surveys and projected agricultural yields.

- Sanuki Province
  - 48 villages in Kagawa District
  - 34 villages in Ouchi District
  - 33 villages in Yamada District
  - 20 villages in Miki District
  - 36 villages in Aya District
  - 18 villages in Naka District
  - 29 villages in Utari District

== See also ==
- List of Han
- Abolition of the han system
