= Hongō Junior and Senior High School =

Location
- 4-11-1, Komagome Toshima-ku, Tokyo 170-0003; Japan
- 35.7365°N 139.7408°E

Information
- Type: junior high and high school
- Established: 1923
- Website: http://www.hongo.ed.jp

Hongō Junior and Senior High School (本郷学園 Hongō Gakuen) is a junior high school in Komagome, Toshima, Tokyo, Japan. It was founded in 1923.

Another educational facility established and operated by Hongō Gakuen is Momiji Kindergarten.

== Access ==
- Just over 2 minutes walk from Sugamo Station
- 7 minutes walk from Komagome Station
