= Sanuki Province =

Former province of Japan

Map of Japanese provinces (1868) with Sanuki Province highlighted

Sanuki Province (讃岐国, Sanuki no Kuni; Japanese pronunciation: [sä́.nɨ̀.kʲì (nò̞ kɯ̈̀.ɲ̟ì), sä̀.nɨ́.kʲí (nò̞ kɯ̈̀.ɲ̟ì)]) was a province of Japan in the area of northeastern Shikoku. Sanuki bordered on Awa to the south, and Iyo to the west. Its abbreviated form name was Sanshū (讃州). In terms of the Gokishichidō system, Sanuki was one of the provinces of the Nankaidō circuit. Under the Engishiki classification system, Sanuki was ranked as one of the "upper countries" (上国) in terms of importance, and one of the "middle countries" (中国) in terms of distance from the capital. The provincial capital was located in what is now the city of Sakaide, but its exact location was only identified in 2012. The ichinomiya of the province is the Tamura jinja located in the city of Takamatsu.

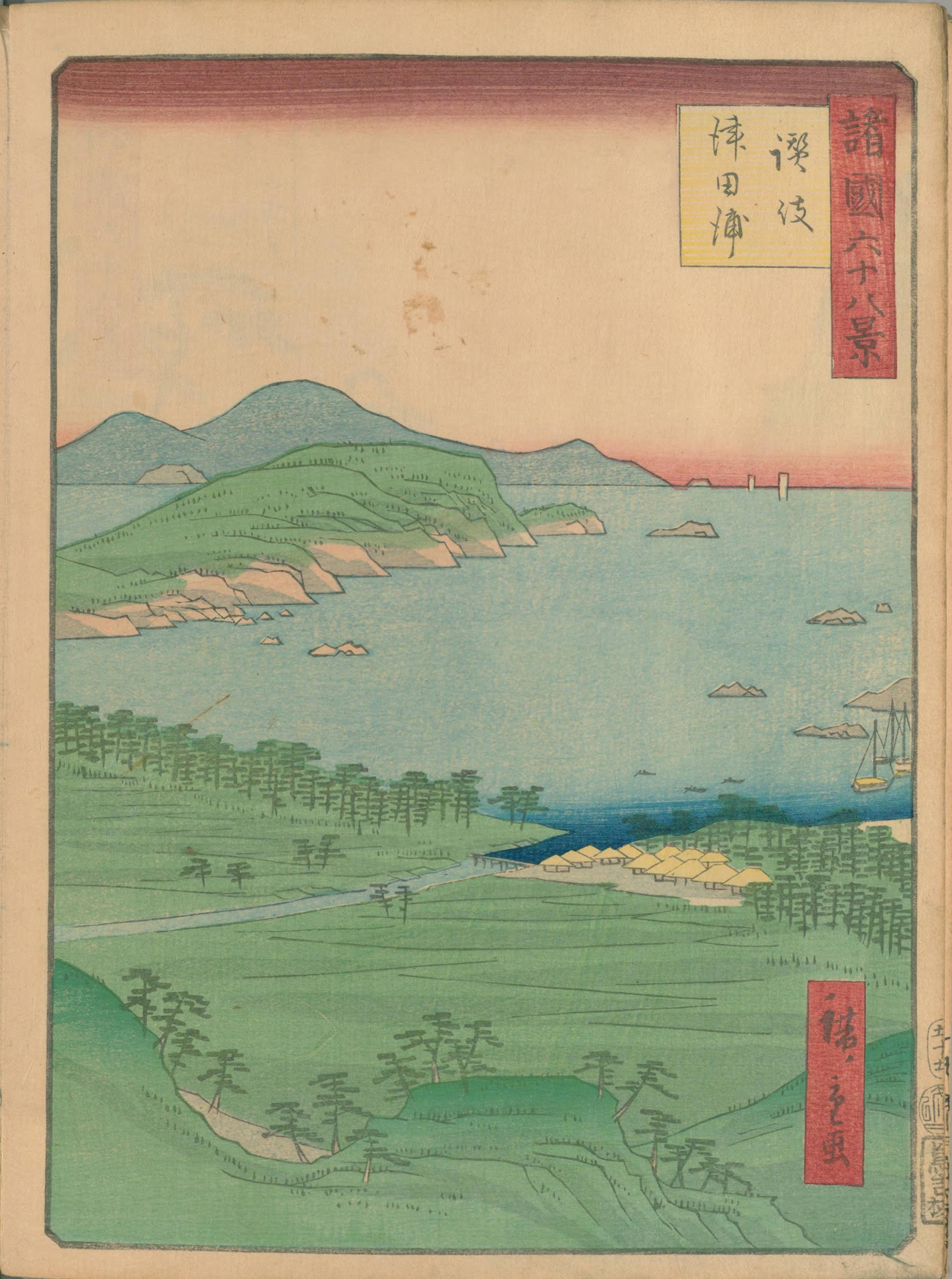
Hiroshige ukiyo-e "Sanuki" in "Sixty-eight Views of the Provinces" (諸国六十八景)

== History ==
In the Kojiki and other ancient texts, this area was called Iyorihiko (飯依比古), but was also called "Sanuki" under various spellings. Sanuki Province was formed by the Ritsuryo reforms. The Shiwaku Islands in the Seto Inland Sea were initially considered part of the province, but Shōdoshima and the Naoshima Islands were not transferred from Bizen Province until the Edo Period. In the Heian period, Sanuki was famous for its associations with the Buddhist monk Kūkai as both his birthplace and the place of his early upbringing. Later, the famed poet Sugawara no Michizane served as governor of the province from 886 to 890 AD. At the end of the Heian period, the Heike clan, which controlled maritime routes on the Seto Inland Sea, had Yashima as one of their main strongholds, but were defeated by Minamoto no Yoshitsune at the Battle of Yashima. In the Muromachi period, the area came under the control of the Hosokawa clan, who were appointed as shugo by the Ashikaga shogunate. However, in the Sengoku period, the Hosokawa were eclipsed by the Miyoshi clan. The Miyoshi were in turn invaded by Chōsokabe clan from Tosa Province and the Chōsokabe were in turn defeated by Toyotomi Hideyoshi. The province was awarded by Hideyoshi to his general Ikoma Chikamasa, who made Takamatsu Castle his stronghold.

In the Edo period, Sanuki was divided into five areas; three han, tenryō territory under direct control of the Tokugawa shogunate and a part of Tsuyama Domain whose headquarters was on Honshū.

Bakumatsu period domains
Name	Clan	Type	kokudaka
Takamatsu Domain	Matsudaira clan	Shinpan	120,000 koku
Marugame Domain	Kyōgoku clan	Tozama	50,000 koku
Tadotsu Domain	Kyōgoku clan	Tozama	10,000 koku

Per the early Meiji period Kyudaka kyuryo Torishirabe-chō (旧高旧領取調帳), an official government assessment of the nation’s resources, the province had 395 villages with a total kokudaka of 293,628 koku. Sanuki Province consisted of the following districts:

Districts of Sanuki Province
District	kokudaka	villages	Domain	Currently
Ōchi (大内郡)	14,642 koku	34 villages	Takamatsu	Dissolved, now Higashikagawa
Sangawa (寒川郡)	21,919 koku	27 villages	Takamatsu	Dissolved; now mostly Sanuki, small area of Higashikagawa
Shōdo (小豆郡)	9,037 koku	8 villages	Tenryō, Tsuyama	Dissolved; now Shōdoshima
Miki (三木郡)	17,491 koku	20 villages	Takamatsu	now mostly Miki, small area of Takamatsu, Sanuki
Yamada (山田郡)	46,790 koku	106 villages	Takamatsu	Dissolved; now Takamatsu
Kagawa (香川郡)	40,353 koku	49 villages	Takamatsu	Dissolved; now Takamatsu
Aya (阿野郡)	31,576 koku	36 villages	Takamatsu	now Takamatsu, Sakaide, Ayagawa, Mannō
Utari (鵜足郡)	29,034 koku	30 villages	Takamatsu, Marugame	now Marugame, Sakaide, Tadotsu and Mannō
Naka (那珂郡)	28,630 koku	46 villages	Tenryō, Takamatsu, Marugame	now Marugame, Sakaide, Zentsūji, Tadotsu, Kotohira, Mannō
Tado (多度郡)	17,314 koku	24 villages	Marugame, Tadotsu	now Zentsūji, Tadotsu
Mino (三野郡)	30,106 koku	37 villages	Marugame, Tadotsu	now Mitoyo, Zentsūji
Toyota (豊田郡)	20,655 koku	46 villages	Marugame	now Mitoyo, Zentsūji

Following the abolition of the han system, Sanuki Province became Kagawa Prefecture in 1872. However, the following year Kagawa was merged with Tokushima Prefecture and the island of Awaji to form Myōdō Prefecture (名東県). It was separated again on September 5, 1875, but on August 21, 1876 was merged with Ehime Prefecture. It was separated again on December 3, 1888.

== Gallery ==
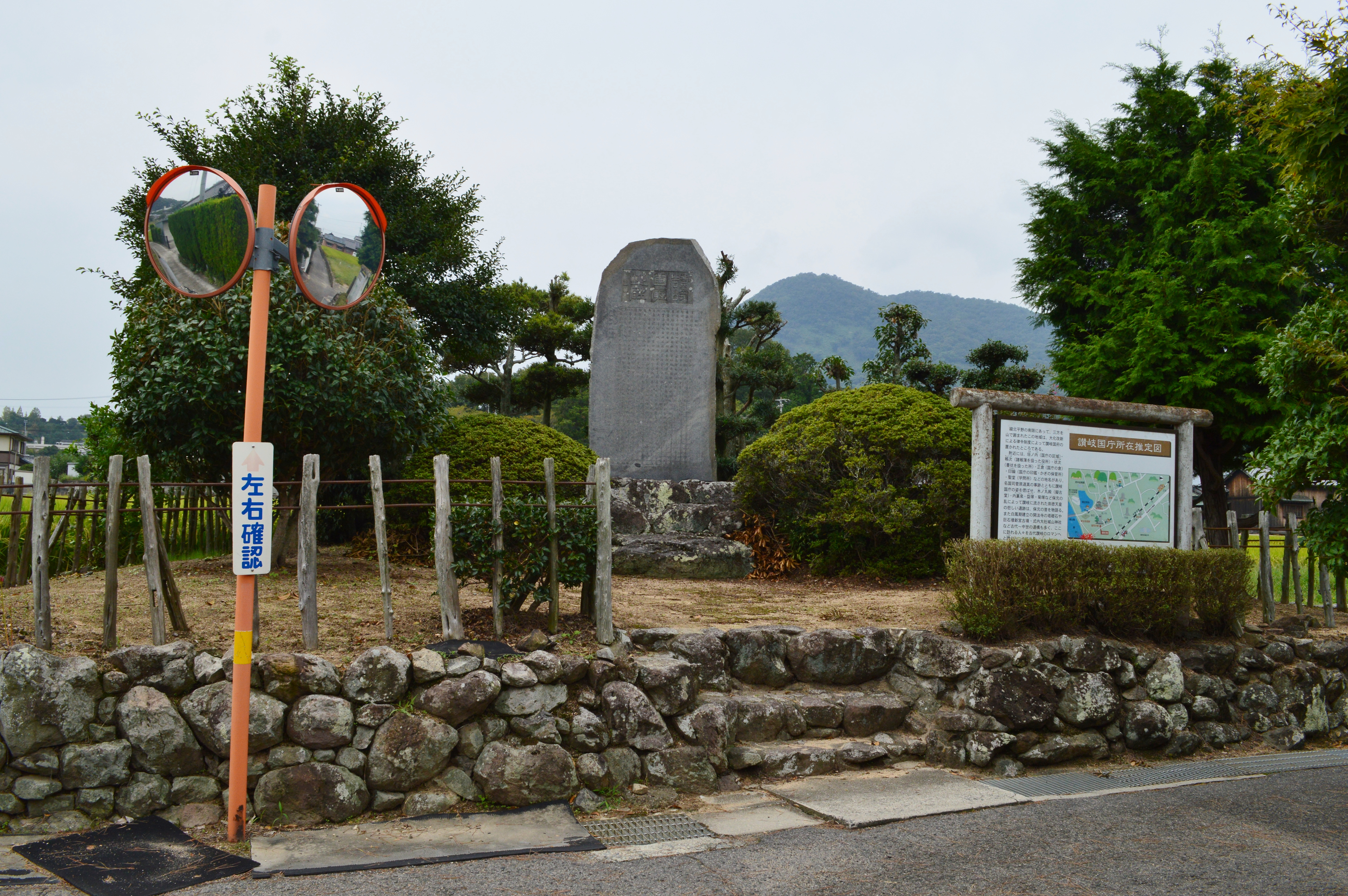
Site of the Sanuki kokufu

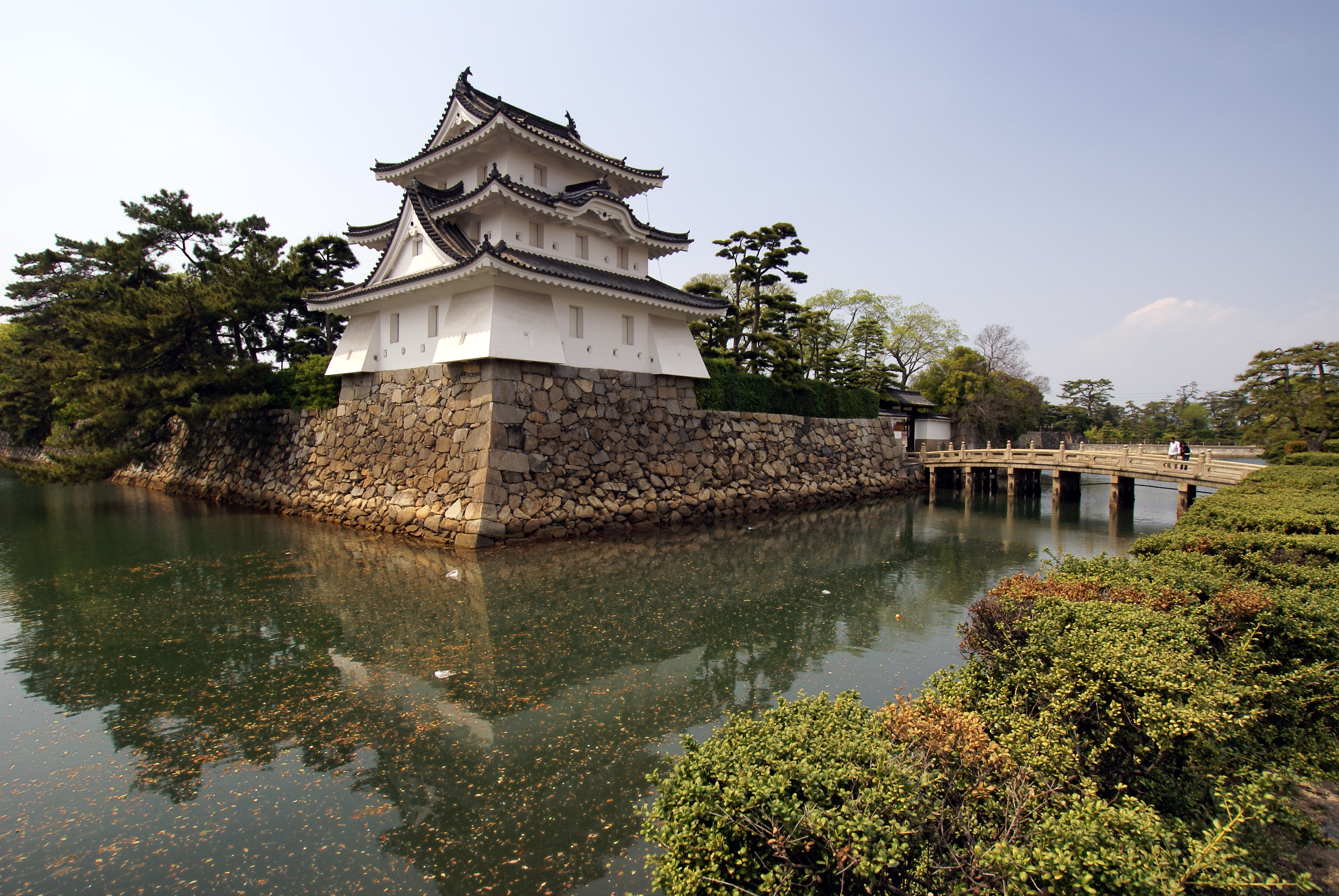
Takamatsu Castle

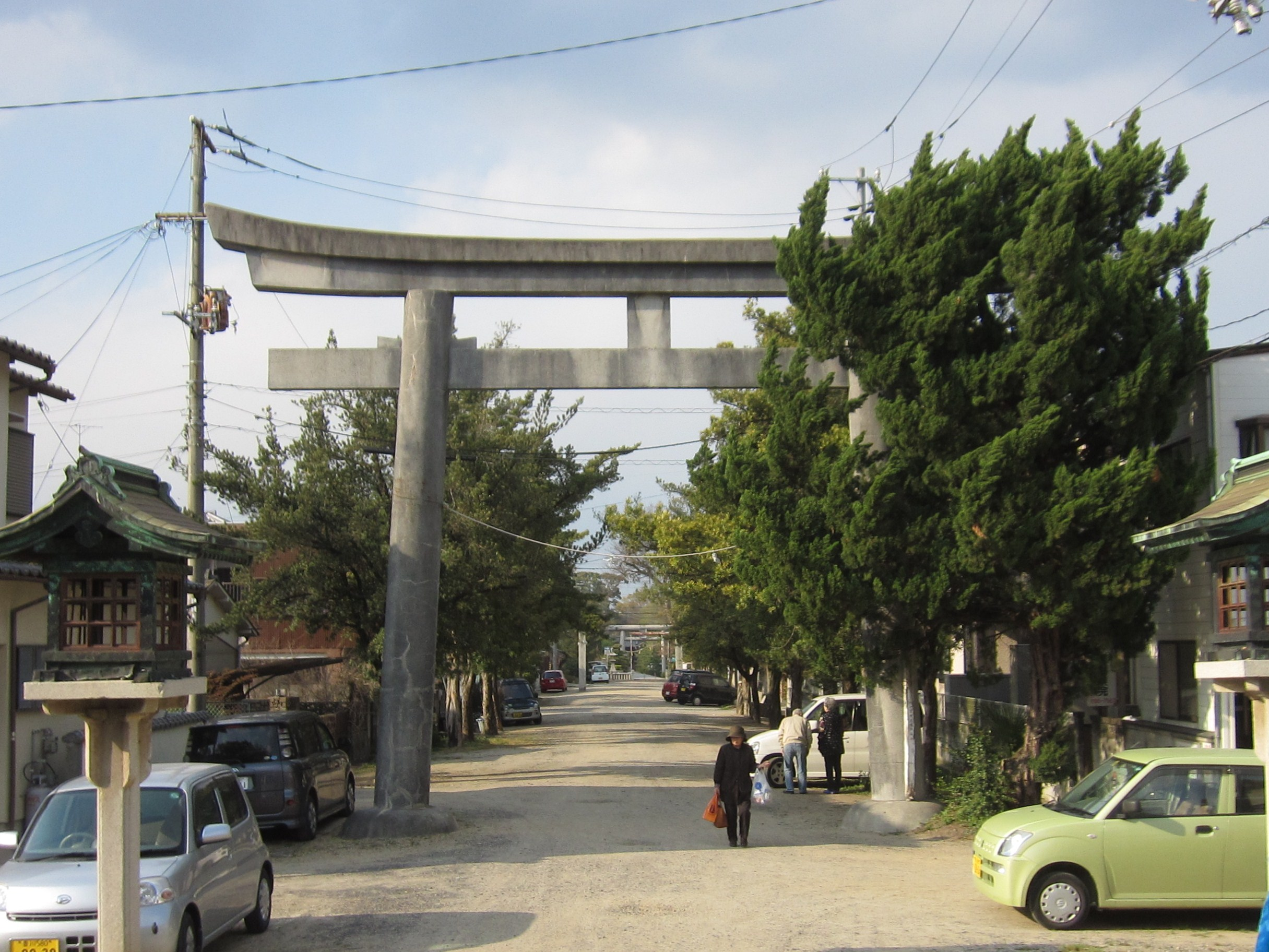
Tamura Jinja

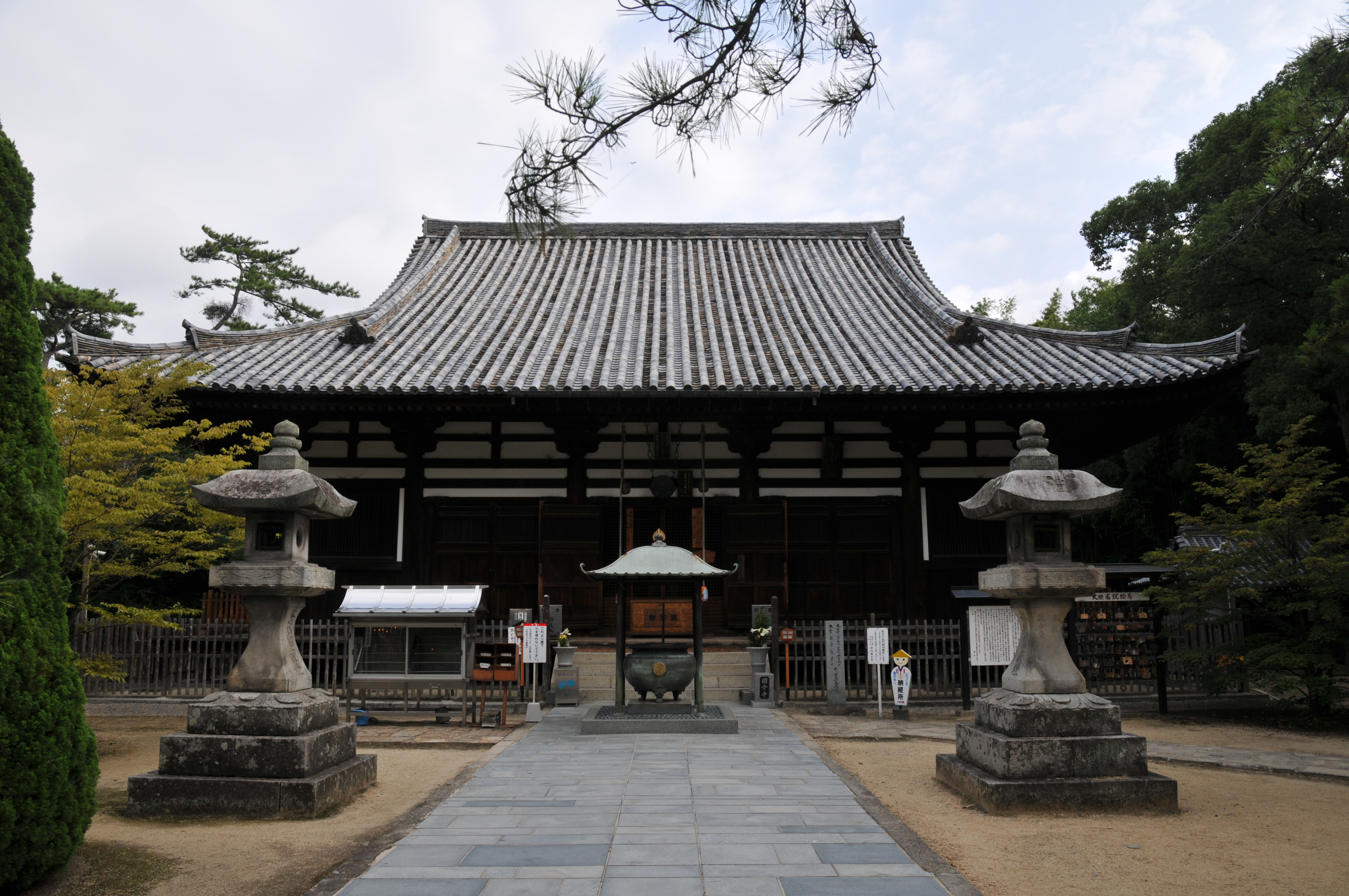
Sanuki Kokubun-ji

== See also ==
- Kamatamare Sanuki – Local association football club based in Takamatsu
- Sanuki udon – Local type of udon
