= 1585 =

1585 in various calendars
- Gregorian calendar: 1585; MDLXXXV
- Ab urbe condita: 2338
- Armenian calendar: 1034; ԹՎ ՌԼԴ
- Assyrian calendar: 6335
- Balinese saka calendar: 1506–1507
- Bengali calendar: 991–992
- Berber calendar: 2535
- English Regnal year: 27 Eliz. 1 – 28 Eliz. 1
- Buddhist calendar: 2129
- Burmese calendar: 947
- Byzantine calendar: 7093–7094
- Chinese calendar: 甲申年 (Wood Monkey); 4282 or 4075 — to — 乙酉年 (Wood Rooster); 4283 or 4076
- Coptic calendar: 1301–1302
- Discordian calendar: 2751
- Ethiopian calendar: 1577–1578
- Hebrew calendar: 5345–5346
- Hindu calendars
- Vikram Samvat: 1641–1642
- Shaka Samvat: 1506–1507
- Kali Yuga: 4685–4686
- Holocene calendar: 11585
- Igbo calendar: 585–586
- Iranian calendar: 963–964
- Islamic calendar: 992–994
- Japanese calendar: Tenshō 13 (天正１３年)
- Javanese calendar: 1504–1505
- Julian calendar: Gregorian minus 10 days
- Korean calendar: 3918
- Minguo calendar: 327 before ROC 民前327年
- Nanakshahi calendar: 117
- Thai solar calendar: 2127–2128
- Tibetan calendar: ཤིང་ཕོ་སྤྲེ་ལོ་ (male Wood-Monkey); 1711 or 1330 or 558 — to — ཤིང་མོ་བྱ་ལོ་ (female Wood-Bird); 1712 or 1331 or 559

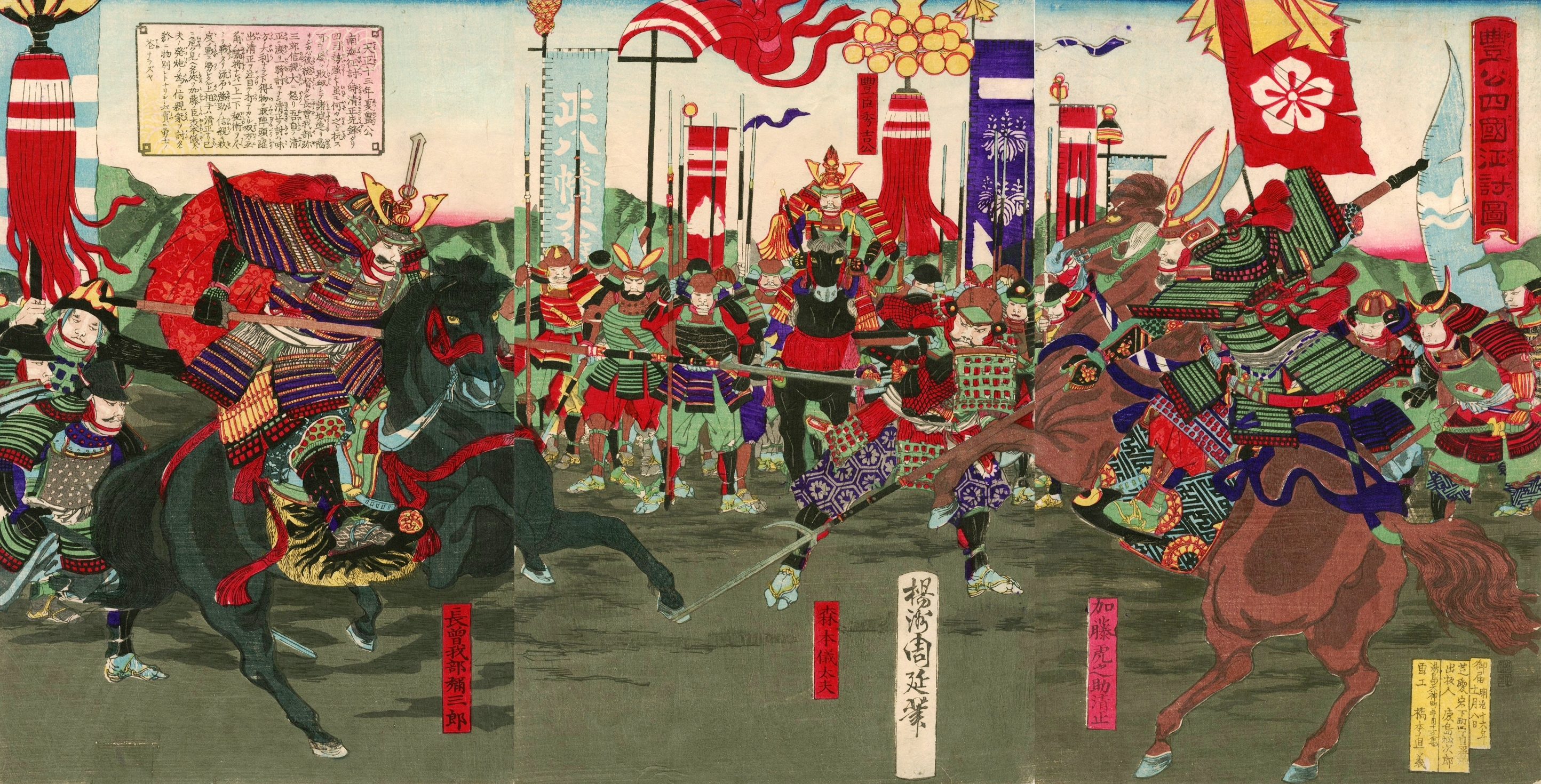
June: The invasion of Shikoku Island takes place in Japan

1585 (MDLXXXV) was a common year starting on Tuesday of the Gregorian calendar and a common year starting on Friday of the Julian calendar, the 1585th year of the Common Era (CE) and Anno Domini (AD) designations, the 585th year of the 2nd millennium, the 85th year of the 16th century, and the 6th year of the 1580s decade. As of the start of 1585, the Gregorian calendar was 10 days ahead of the Julian calendar, which remained in localized use until 1923.

== Events ==
=== January–March ===
- January 21 – Robert Nutter, Thomas Worthington, and 18 other Roman Catholic priests are "perpetually banished" from England by order of Queen Elizabeth, placed on the ship Mary Martin of Colchester, and transported to France.
- February 16 – Pachomius II is deposed by fellow bishops from his position as Ecumenical Patriarch of Constantinople, head of the Eastern Orthodox Church, and replaced by the Metropolitan of Philippoupolis, Theoleptus II.
- February 21 – King Johan III of Sweden, widowed since 1583, marries Gunilla Bielke in a ceremony at Västerås, which the King's siblings refuse to attend. The coronation of Queen consort Gunilla takes place the next day. Over the next seven years, she works on changing the Catholic government's attitude towards Protestants.
- March 10 – The Spanish Army, commanded by Alexander Farnese, Duke of Parma, obtains the surrender of Brussels after a siege that began the year before.

=== April–June ===
- April 10 – Pope Gregory XIII, known for promulgating the Gregorian calendar within the Roman Catholic nations of the world in 1582, dies after a reign of almost 13 years. A papal conclave is convened 11 days later to elect a successor.
- April 21 – The papal conclave begins at the Vatican in Rome on Easter Sunday, with only 42 of the 60 cardinals attending. Early voting favors Cardinals Pier Donato Cesi and Guglielmo Sirleto, neither of whom receives a majority.
- April 24 – Cardinal Felice Piergentile of the church of San Girolamo dei Croati is unanimously elected as the 227th Pope, and takes the regnal name Pope Sixtus V.
- May 1 – The coronation of Pope Sixtus V takes place in Rome.
- May 19 – Spain seizes English ships in Spanish ports, precipitating the Anglo-Spanish War (1585–1604).
- June 11 – The 9.2 magnitude Aleutian Islands earthquake unleashes a tsunami in the Pacific Ocean, killing many people in Hawaii and reportedly striking Japan.
- June – Toyotomi Hideyoshi begins the invasion of the Japanese island of Shikoku with an army of 113,000 men on 703 ships. The troops are divided into three groups, with 60,000 commanded by Hashiba Hidenaga and Hashiba Hidetsugu toward the provinces of Awa and Tosa; 23,000 under Ukita Hideie at the province of Sanuki; and 30,000 under Kobayakawa Takakage and Kikkawa Motoharu for the province of Iyo.

=== July–September ===
- July 7 – The Treaty of Nemours forces King Henry III of France to capitulate to the demands of the Catholic League, triggering the Eighth War of Religion (also known as the War of the Three Henrys) in France.
- July 12 – Invasion of Shikoku: The final battle of the invasion, the siege of Ichinomiya Castle, begins.
- July 29 – Aboard the English ship Tiger, Roanoke expedition leader Ralph Lane negotiates an agreement with the Secotan people, who are represented by Granganimeo, the brother of the Secotan leader, King Wingino. Although the Secotans grant Lane's request to allow the English to live on Roanoke Island, he is told that they will receive no assistance from the natives, because of problems the previous year with Walter Raleigh.
- August 6 – (11th day of the 7th month of Tenshō 13) Invasion of Shikoku: In Japan, Chōsokabe Motochika surrenders the island of Shikoku to Toyotomi Hideyoshi, after a 26 day siege of the Ichinomiya Castle by 40,000 men.
- August 8 – English explorer John Davis enters Cumberland Sound in Baffin Island, in his quest for the Northwest Passage.
- August 14 – Queen Elizabeth I of England agrees to establish a protectorate over the Netherlands.
- August 17
  - Antwerp, now in Belgium, is captured by Spanish forces commanded by the Duke of Parma. The Duke orders all Protestants to leave the city. As a result, over half of the 100,000 inhabitants flee to the northern provinces. Furthermore, upon hearing of the capture of Antwerp, a relief fleet sent to raise the siege instead blockades the Scheldt River, preventing any and all ships from reaching Antwerp for two centuries. This effectively destroys Antwerp's position as an important trade city and de facto capital of the Dutch provinces. Its position is taken over by various northern cities, most prominently Amsterdam.
  - The Roanoke colonists complete their construction of a fort under the direction of Ralph Lane to make the first permanent English settlement in North America.
- August 20 – The Treaty of Nonsuch is signed, committing England to support the Dutch Revolt, thus entering the Eighty Years' War.
- September 11 – In the Ottoman Empire, the rebellion of An-Nasir al-Hasan bin Ali in Yemen is ended when An-Nasir is betrayed and turned over to the Turkish Ottoman governor. An-Nasir spends one year in prison in Sanaa and then brought to Turkey.
- September 15 – English Catholic priest John Adams is banished from England along with 72 other Catholic priests, and transported by ship to Boulogne in France.
- September 21 – King Henry III of Navarre, who is also the heir presumptive to France's King Henry III, is excommunicated from the Roman Catholic Church by Pope Sixtus V, who effectively declares that French Catholics are not required to recognize his claim to the throne.

=== October–December ===
- October 15 – In Arnhem in the Netherlands, the siege of IJsseloord is completed after nine days as English and Dutch forces recapture the city from Spanish occupiers.
- November 18 – In Mexico City, Álvaro Manrique de Zúñiga becomes Viceroy of New Spain after being appointed by King Philip II of Spain.
- November 27 – A 6.6 magnitude earthquake strikes Japan, and serves a foreshock and a trigger to a deadly 7.9 magnitude earthquake on January 18 that will kill 8,000 people.
- November 28 – Anglo-Spanish War: The island of Santiago in Cape Verde is captured by Francis Drake.
- December 1 – Hadim Mesih Pasha is appointed the new Grand Vizier of the Ottoman Empire by Sultan Murad III.
- December 20 – Enraged by the disrespect shown to him by Yousuf Shah Chak, the Mughal Emperor, Akbar, orders the invasion of Kashmir with 5,000 men.

=== Date unknown ===
- The Kingdom of Luba is founded by Kongolo Mwamba in what is now the Democratic Republic of Congo.
- History of chocolate in Spain: First recorded commercial importation of chocolate to Europe, from Veracruz in Mexico to Seville in Spain.
- The Frankfurt Stock Exchange is founded.

== Births ==
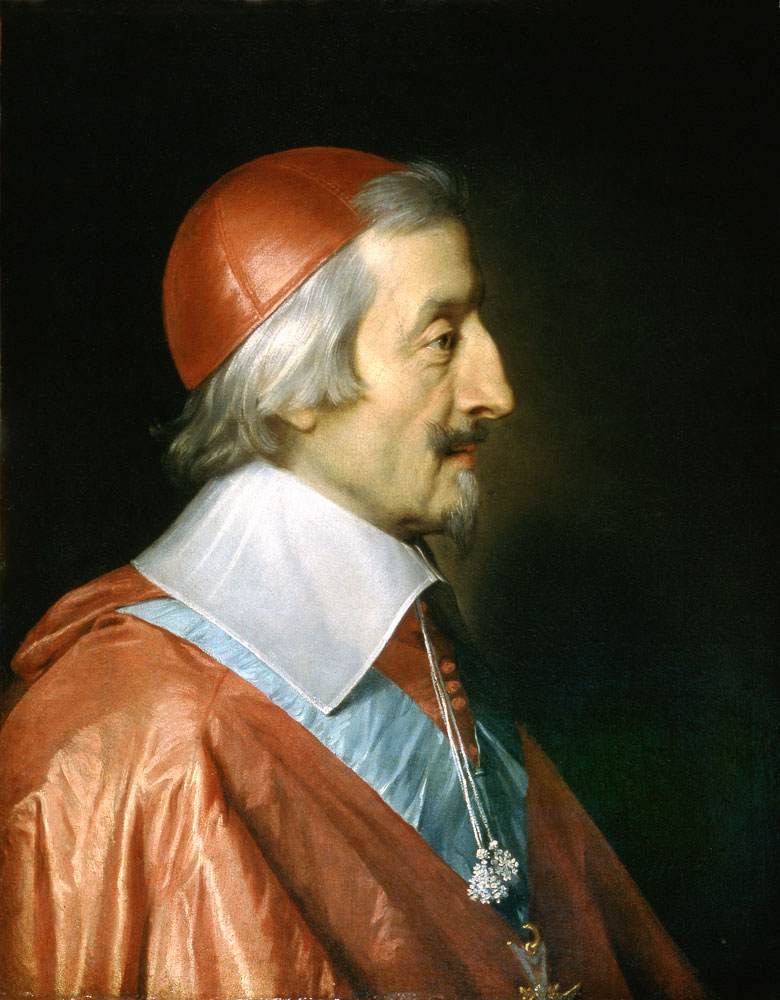
Cardinal Richelieu

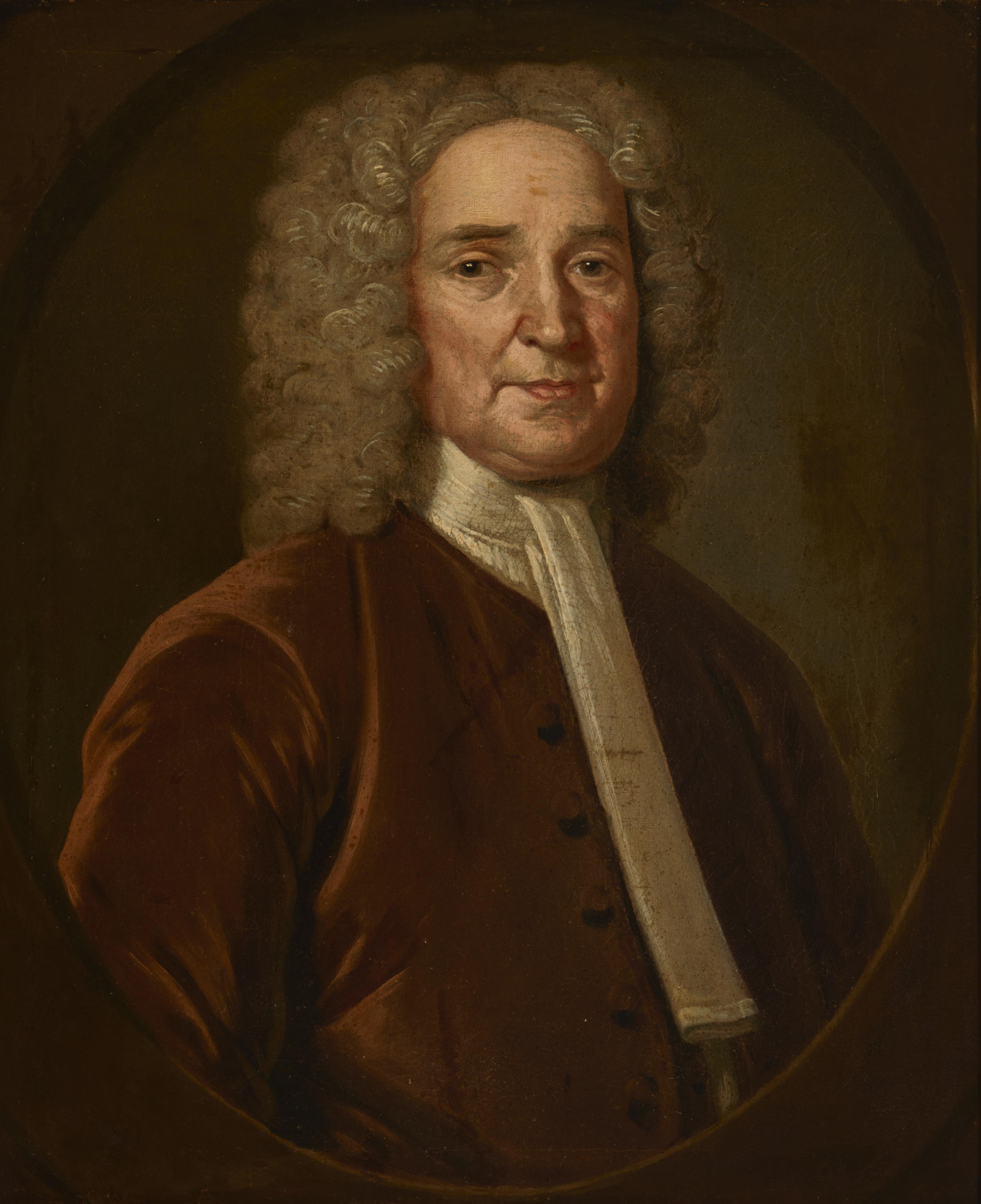
John Cotton

- January 5 – Carlo Emanuele Pio di Savoia, Italian Catholic cardinal (d. 1641)
- January 6 – Claude Favre de Vaugelas, Savoyard grammarian and man of letters (d. 1650)
- January 8 – Henriette Catherine de Joyeuse, Duchess of Joyeuse (d. 1656)
- January 9 – Sir Richard Grosvenor, 1st Baronet, English politician (d. 1645)
- January 23 – Mary Ward, English Catholic Religious Sister (d. 1645)
- January 24 – Anna Maria of Solms-Sonnewalde, Countess consort of Hohenlohe-Langenburg (d. 1634)
- January 27 – Hendrick Avercamp, Dutch painter (d. 1634)
- January 28 – Domenico II Contarini, Doge of Venice (d. 1675)
- January 31 – Daniel Schwenter, German Orientalist (d. 1636)
- February 2
  - Judith Quiney, William Shakespeare's youngest daughter (d. 1662)
  - Hamnet Shakespeare, William Shakespeare's only son (d. 1596)
- February 25 – Pieter van den Broecke, Dutch merchant (d. 1640)
- March 2 – John Macias, Spanish Dominican lay brother (d. 1645)
- March 5
  - Frederick I, Landgrave of Hesse-Homburg, founder of the junior line Hesse-Homburg (d. 1638)
  - John George I, Elector of Saxony (d. 1656)
- March 6 – Francesco Cornaro, Doge of Venice (d. 1656)
- March 16 – Gerbrand Adriaensz Bredero, Dutch writer (d. 1618)
- March 22 – Krzysztof Radziwiłł, Polish nobleman (d. 1640)
- April 6 – Marzio Ginetti, Italian Catholic cardinal (d. 1671)
- April 28 – George Goring, 1st Earl of Norwich, English soldier and politician (d. 1663)
- May 1 – Sophia Olelkovich Radziwill, Polish-Lithuanian noble (d. 1612)
- May 5 – Vincenzo Carafa, Italian Jesuit priest and spiritual writer (d. 1649)
- May 6 – Guy XX de Laval, French noble (d. 1605)
- May 12 – John Oglander, English politicians (d. 1655)
- June 11 – Evert Horn, Swedish soldier (d. 1615)
- June 13 – Antonio Ruiz de Montoya, Peruvian and Paraguayan linguist (d. 1652)
- June 24 – Johannes Lippius, German theologian, philosopher, composer and music theorist (d. 1612)
- July 2 – Jean Guiton, French Huguenot ship owner (d. 1654)
- July 11
  - Nicolaus Hunnius, German theologian (d. 1643)
  - Timothy Turner, British serjeant-at-law (d. 1677)
- July 26 – Dániel Esterházy, Hungarian noble (d. 1654)
- August 3 – Sir Thomas Burdett, 1st Baronet, of Bramcote, Sheriff of Derbyshire (d. 1647)
- August 5 – Jesper Brochmand, Danish bishop (d. 1652)
- August 25 – Giovanni Biliverti, Italian painter (d. 1644)
- August 26 – Peter Lauremberg, German writer and professor (d. 1639)
- September 9 – Armand Jean du Plessis, Cardinal Richelieu, French statesman and 4th Prime Minister of France (d. 1642)
- September 15 – Ottavio Vannini, Italian painter (d. 1640)
- September 26 – Antonio Franco, Italian Catholic bishop, prelate of Santa Lucia del Mela (d. 1626)
- September 27 – John Strangways, English politician (d. 1666)
- October 4 – Anna of Tyrol, Holy Roman Empress (d. 1618)
- October 8 – Heinrich Schütz, German composer (d. 1672)
- October 10 – Sir Edward Hussey, 1st Baronet, English politician (d. 1648)
- October 11 – Johann Heermann, German poet, hymn-writer (d. 1647)
- October 15 – Louis Cappel, French Protestant churchman and scholar (d. 1658)
- October 28 – Cornelius Jansen, French bishop of Ypres and religious reformer (d. 1638)
- October – John Ball, English puritan divine (d. 1640)
- November 1
  - Jan Brożek, Polish mathematician, physician and astronomer (d. 1652)
  - Adriaan Pauw (d. 1653)
- November 2 – Rudolf von Colloredo, Austrian field marshal (d. 1657)
- November 5 – Sir John St John, 1st Baronet, English baronet (d. 1648)
- November 26 – Herman op den Graeff, Dutch bishop (d. 1642)
- November 30 – Filippo Benedetto de Sio, Italian Catholic prelate, Bishop of Boiano (1641–1651) and Bishop of Caiazzo (1623–1641) (d. 1651)
- December 3 – Matthew Wren, influential English clergyman (d. 1667)
- December 4
  - John Cotton, clergyman in England and the American colonies, founder of Boston (d. 1652)
- December 13 – William Drummond of Hawthornden, Scottish poet (d. 1649)
- December 16 – Livia della Rovere, Italian noble (d. 1641)
- December 25 – Christian, Count of Waldeck-Wildungen (1588–1637) (d. 1637)
- December 31
  - Gonzalo Fernández de Córdoba, Spanish general (d. 1645)
  - Sumitomo Masatomo, Japanese businessman (d. 1652)
- date unknown
  - Zachary Boyd, Scottish religious writer (d. 1653)
  - Ambrose Barlow, Catholic priest and martyr (d. 1641)
  - Thomas Preston, 1st Viscount Tara, Irish soldier (d. 1655)
  - Lucilio Vanini, Italian free-thinker (d. 1619)
  - Alexander Whitaker, Virginia Colony religious leader (d. 1616)
  - Fang Weiyi, Chinese poet, calligrapher, painter and literature historian (d. 1668)

== Deaths ==
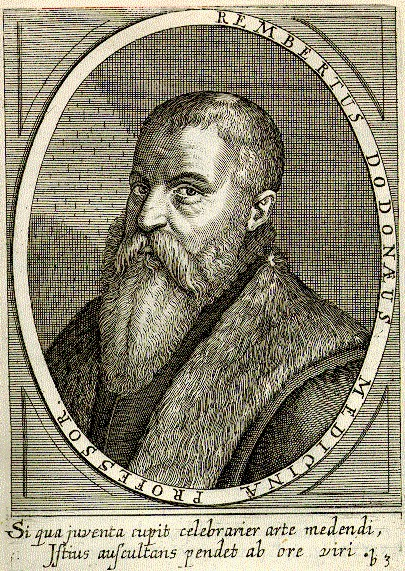
Rembert Dodoens

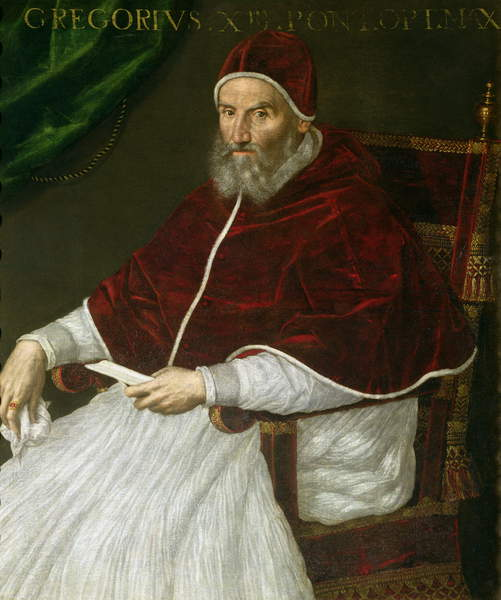
Pope Gregory XIII

- January 16 – Edward Clinton, 1st Earl of Lincoln, English admiral (b. 1512)
- February 6 – Edmund Plowden, English legal scholar (b. 1518)
- February 13 – Alfonso Salmeron, Spanish Jesuit biblical scholar (b. 1515)
- March 10 – Rembert Dodoens, Flemish physician and botanist (b. 1517)
- April 3 – Thomas Goldwell, English ecclesiastic (b. 1501)
- April 22 – Henry of Saxe-Lauenburg, Prince-Archbishop of Bremen, Prince-Bishop of Osnabrück and Paderborn (b. 1550)
- April 10 – Pope Gregory XIII (b. 1502)
- May 15 – Niwa Nagahide, Japanese warlord (b. 1535)
- June 4 – Muretus, French humanist (b. 1526)
- June 18 – Jacques de Savoie, Duke of Nemours, French nobleman and soldier (b. 1531)
- June 21 – Henry Percy, 8th Earl of Northumberland, English nobleman and conspirator, suicide (b. 1532)
- June 19 – Francisco de Holanda, Portuguese artist (b. 1517)
- June 22 – Simon Sulzer, Swiss theologian (b. 1508)
- July 6 – Thomas Aufield, English Catholic martyr (b. 1552)
- July 28 – Francis Russell, 2nd Earl of Bedford, English nobleman, soldier and politician (b. 1527)
- c. July? – Shimon Lavi, Sephardi kabbalist (b. 1486)
- August 5 or August 6 – Yermak Timofeyevich, Cossack leader and explorer of Siberia
- 8 August – Ismihan Sultan, Ottoman princess (b. 1545)
- September 6 – Luca Cambiasi, Italian painter (b. 1527)
- October 1 – Anne of Denmark, Electress of Saxony (b. 1532)
- October 19 – Johannes Crato von Krafftheim, German humanist and physician (b. 1519)
- October 29 – Özdemiroğlu Osman Pasha, Ottoman (Turkish) grand vizier (b. 1526)
- November 2 – Tachibana Dōsetsu, Japanese daimyō (b. 1513)
- November 23 – Thomas Tallis, English composer (b. c. 1510)
- December 27 – Pierre de Ronsard, French poet (b. 1524)
- November 28 – Hernando Franco, Spanish composer (b. 1532)
- December 4 – John Willock, Scottish reformer (b. c. 1515)
- December 22 – Vittoria Accoramboni, Italian noblewoman (b. 1557)
- approx. date – Qiu Zhu, Chinese painter
- date unknown
  - Taqi ad-Din Muhammad ibn Ma'ruf, Turkish scientist (b. 1526)
  - Nguyễn Bỉnh Khiêm, Vietnamese administrator, educator, poet, sage and later a saint of the Cao Dai religion (b. 1491)
