= Theoleptus =

Theoleptus (Greek: Θεόληπτος) is a Greek name. Notable historical figures with this name include:

- Theoleptos of Philadelphia (c. 1250–1322), Byzantine monk, theologian, and Metropolitan of Philadelphia (modern Alaşehir)
- Theoleptus I of Constantinople (died 1522), Ecumenical Patriarch of Constantinople
- Theoleptus II of Constantinople (died after 1597), Ecumenical Patriarch of Constantinople
