= Patriarch Jeremias of Constantinople =

Patriarch Jeremias of Constantinople may refer to:

- Jeremias I of Constantinople (died 1546), Ecumenical Patriarch of Constantinople in 1522–1524 and 1525–1546
- Jeremias II of Constantinople (c. 1536–1595), Ecumenical Patriarch of Constantinople in 1572–1579, 1580–1584 and 1587–1595
- Jeremias III of Constantinople (c. 1650/1660–1735), Ecumenical Patriarch of Constantinople in 1716–1726 and 1732–1733
