= Patriarch Nephon of Constantinople =

Patriarch Nephon of Constantinople may refer to:

- Nephon I of Constantinople, Ecumenical Patriarch in 1310–1314
- Nephon II of Constantinople, Ecumenical Patriarch in 1486–1488, 1497–1498 and 1502
