= Norifusa =

- Gender: Male

Origin
- Origin: Japanese
- Meaning: Different meanings depending on the kanji used

Norifusa (written: 教房, 紀房 or 則房) is a masculine Japanese given name. Notable people with the name include:

- Akamatsu Norifusa (赤松 則房) (1559–1598), Japanese samurai
- Ichijō Norifusa (一条 教房) (1423–1480), Japanese kugyō
- Norifusa Mita (三田 紀房) (born 1958), Japanese manga artist
