= Patriarch Dionysius of Constantinople =

Patriarch Dionysius of Constantinople may refer to:

- Dionysius I of Constantinople, Ecumenical Patriarch in 1466–1471 and 1488–1490
- Dionysius II of Constantinople, Ecumenical Patriarch in 1546–1556
