= Patriarch Joannicius of Constantinople =

Patriarch Joannicius of Constantinople may refer to:

- Joannicius I of Constantinople, Ecumenical Patriarch in 1524–1525
- Joannicius II of Constantinople, Ecumenical Patriarch in 1646–1648, 1651–1652, 1653–1654 and 1655–1656
- Joannicius III of Constantinople, Ecumenical Patriarch in 1761–1763
