= Patriarch Joachim of Constantinople =

Patriarch Joachim of Constantinople may refer to:

- Patriarch Joachim I of Constantinople (r. 1498–1502 and 1504)
- Patriarch Joachim II of Constantinople (r. 1860–1863 and 1873–1878)
- Patriarch Joachim III of Constantinople (r. 1878–1884 and 1901–1912)
- Patriarch Joachim IV of Constantinople (r. 1884–1887)
