= Joannicius I =

Joannicius I may refer to:

- Joannicius I of Constantinople, Ecumenical Patriarch from 1524 to 1525
- Joannicius I of Serbia
- Joannicius I of Montenegro
