= Michael Kantakouzenos Şeytanoğlu =

Ottoman Greek magnate (1510–1578)

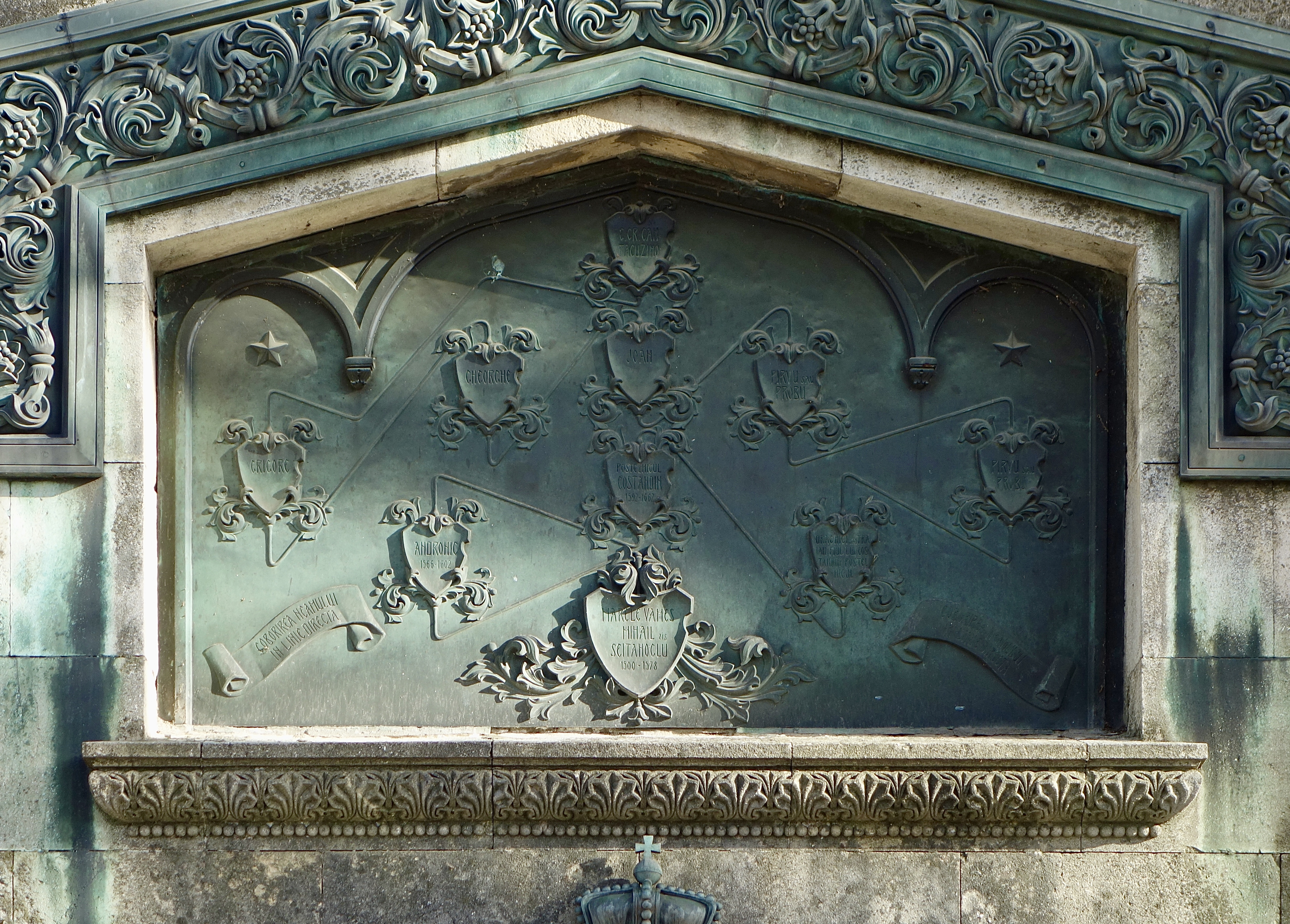
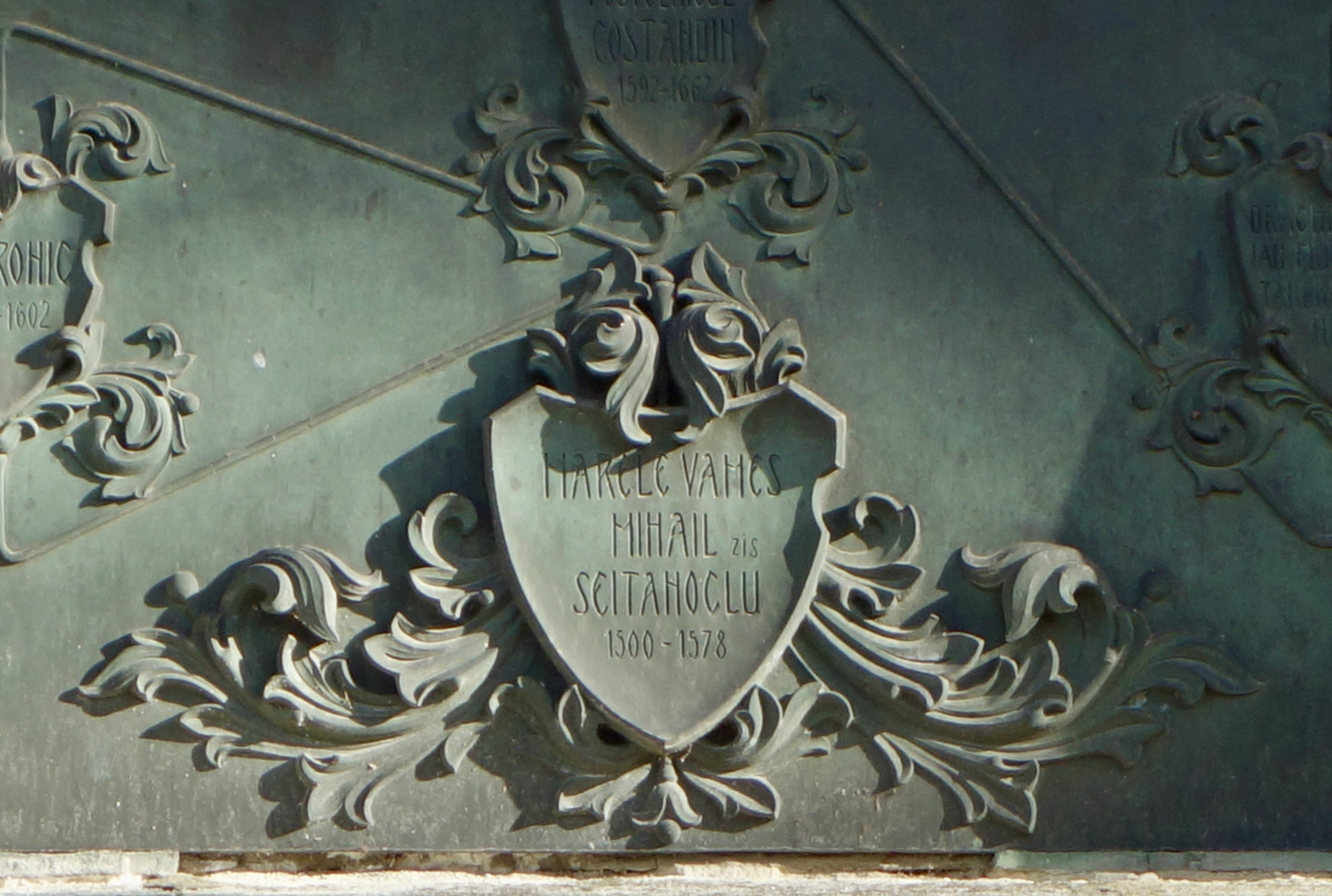
The name of Michael at the base of the family tree on the grave of Gheorghe Grigore Cantacuzino in the Bellu Cemetery in Bucharest, Romania

Michael Kantakouzenos or Cantacuzenus (Greek: Μιχαὴλ Καντακουζηνός; 1510 – 3 March 1578), nicknamed Şeytanoğlu (Turkish for "son of the Devil"), was an Ottoman Greek magnate, noted for his immense wealth and political influence. Until his fall from favour and execution in 1578, he dominated the affairs of the Greek Orthodox community (millet) of the Ottoman Empire, being responsible for the rise and fall of bishops and patriarchs.

== Background ==
Nothing is known of Michael Kantakouzenos' origins and early life. Although he bears the name of one of the most distinguished dynasties of the late Byzantine Empire, it was usual among wealthy Greeks of the time to assume Byzantine surnames and claim descent from the famous noble houses of their Byzantine past. On Kantakouzenos himself, the German chaplain Stephan Gerlach, who lived in Constantinople at the time, reported his view that he was actually the son of the English ambassador, but this is mostly dismissed by modern scholars. The eminent 20th-century Byzantinist Steven Runciman at any rate considered the latter-day Kantakouzenoi "perhaps the only family whose claim to be in the direct line from Byzantine Emperors was authentic". On the other hand, according to Donald Nicol, "[...] historians have indeed labored to show that [...] of all the Byzantine imperial families that of the Kantakouzenos is the only one which can truthfully be said to have survived to this day; but the line of succession after the middle of the fifteenth century is, to say the least, uncertain."

== Life ==
Kantakouzenos made his wealth through successful mercantile speculations, which allowed him to engage in the lucrative tax farming of the Ottoman Empire's provinces. In this he so distinguished himself for his rapacity and severity towards his fellow Christians that he earned the epithet "Son of the Devil" (Turkish Şeytanoğlu, often rendered Shaytanoglu).

He also secured the profitable monopoly on the salt works of Anchialos and the customs of Constantinople, as well as fisheries and the monopoly of the fur trade with Russia, which alone was said to bring him an annual revenue of 60,000 ducats. His wealth was such that after the destruction of the Ottoman fleet in the Battle of Lepanto in 1571, he was able to build and equip 60 galleys from his own resources. His power was backed and secured by his close relationship with the powerful Grand Vizier, Sokollu Mehmed Pasha, and other important figures at the Ottoman court, who received a share of his profits.

"The election of the metropolitan proceeds in the same way. Those who have money will make gifts to the Bassas [Pasha] and to Kantakouzenos of several hundred ducats, then this or that one will write to the patriarch: "Give this one there the office of metropolitan; then the patriarch has to obey without speaking a word against it"

— Diary of Stephan Gerlach, translated by Papademetriou

Michael became thus the most distinguished and powerful of all Greek magnates (archons) of the Ottoman capital. His influence was such that contemporaries called him "the pillar" of the Greek nation, and the contemporary German scholar Martin Crusius called him "the God" of the Greeks. As a token of his power, he sealed his letters with the double-headed eagle of the Byzantine emperors.

Consequently, Michael played an active role on the sale of offices within the Greek Orthodox community (millet), ranging from provincial episcopal sees to the Patriarchate of Constantinople and even the two Danubian principalities of Moldavia and Wallachia. Thus in 1565 he brought down the popular Patriarch Joasaph II and installed in his place Metrophanes III, whom he had already previously helped to acquire the bishoprics of Larissa and Chios. In exchange, Metrophanes undertook to pay Kantakouzenos the sum of 2,000 florins a year for eight years; much of this of course went on to fill the pockets of Sokollu Mehmed.

Although at first a willing aide in Michael's various schemes, Metrophanes eventually fell out with Kantakouzenos and was deposed in 1572, amidst allegations of treacherous contacts with Western powers. Michael also brought about the downfall of the prince of Wallachia, Peter, and appears to have gained control of the revenues of both Wallachia and Moldavia, which he taxed heavily.

Michael preferred to live at Anchialos, a city almost exclusively inhabited by Greeks, where he had built a magnificent palace that cost 20,000 ducats and was said to rival the Sultan's own. Nevertheless, his extravagance aroused the envy and enmity not only of his fellow Greeks, but of the Turks as well, and when the influence of his patron, Sokollu Mehmed, began to decline, his enemies struck: in July 1576 he was arrested and his property confiscated, but he managed to save his life and secure his release through the intervention of Sokollu Mehmed. Kantakouzenos was able to re-acquire his fortune, but he was again accused of plotting against the Sultan, and on 3 March 1578, he was hanged from the gateway of his palace in Anchialos.

His possessions, including "an almost infinite number" of silk, brocaded, or velvet clothes, decorated with gold and rubies and other precious stones, as well as horses and other precious items, were auctioned off. Such was the scale of the affair that having bought something "at Şeytanoğlu's auction" became proverbial for future generations. Among the items sold was Kantakouzenos' sizeable library, comprising many valuable manuscripts. It was mostly bought up by the monasteries of Mount Athos, which teamed up for the purpose.

== Family ==
Michael married twice. His first wife is unknown, but he had at least one daughter by her, who married a member of the Rallis family.

His second wife, whom he wed at an advanced age, was a daughter of the Prince of Wallachia Mircea and Doamna Chiajna, but she refused to follow him to Constantinople. Here there is a confusion with his brother Ioannis (Iani), who was about to marry that princess. Michael married the daughter of another prince of Wallachia, Mircea III, the grandson of Vlad Dracula (Vlad the Impaler).

Michael's three sons, Andronikos (born 1553), Demetrios (born 1566) and John (born 1570), survived him. Andronikos managed to regain part of his father's wealth and, like him, rose to the position of king-maker for the Wallachian princes: it was he who nominated Michael the Brave as prince of Wallachia in 1593, and two of his sisters were married to Michael's predecessor prince Stephen the Deaf (or alternatively to Michael's half-brother Peter and Aaron the Tyrant of Moldavia).

== Sources ==
- Braudel, Fernand (1995). The Mediterranean and the Mediterranean World in the Age of Philip II, Volume II. Berkeley and Los Angeles: University of California Press. ISBN 0-520-20330-5.
- Finlay, George (1856). The History of Greece under Othoman and Venetian Domination. Edinburgh and London: William Blackwood and Sons.
- İnalcık, Halil (1997). An Economic and Social History of the Ottoman Empire. Volume One, 1300–1600. Cambridge: Cambridge University Press. ISBN 0-521-57456-0.
- Iorga, Nicolae (1935). Byzance après Byzance (in French). Bucharest: Editions de l'Institut d'études byzantines. Archived from the original on 3 March 2016.
- Nicol, Donald M. (1968). The Byzantine Family of Kantakouzenos (Cantacuzenus), ca. 1100–1460: A Genealogical and Prosopographical Study. Dumbarton Oaks studies 11. Washington, DC: Dumbarton Oaks Center for Byzantine Studies. OCLC 390843.
- Papademetriou, Tom (2015). Render Unto the Sultan: Power, Authority, and the Greek Orthodox Church in the Early Ottoman Centuries. Oxford: Oxford University Press. ISBN 978-0-19-871789-8.
- Runciman, Steven (1985). The Great Church in Captivity: A Study of the Patriarchate of Constantinople from the Eve of the Turkish Conquest to the Greek War of Independence. Cambridge: Cambridge University Press. ISBN 0-521-31310-4.
- Stefan Gerlach des Aelteren Tagebuch der von zween Glorwürrtigsten römischen Kaysern, Maximiliano und Rudolpho, Beyderseits den Andern dieses Nahmens an die ottomanische Pforte zu Constantinopel abgefertigten Gesandschaft. Herfürgegeben durch seinen Enkel M. Samuelem Gerlachium. Frankfurt a. M., in Verlegung Johann-David Zunners, 1674, 552 p.
