= Stephan Gerlach =

German Lutheran theologian (1546–1612)

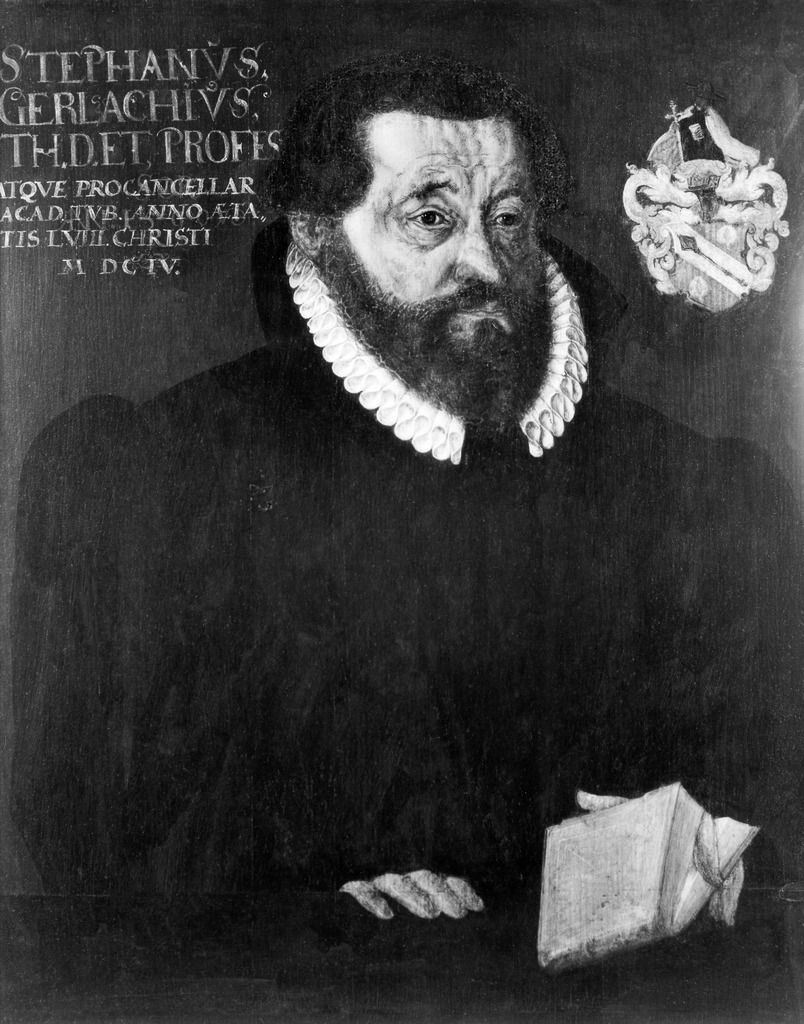
- Born: 26 December 1546; Knittlingen
- Died: 30 January 1612 (aged 65); Tübingen
- Education: University of Tübingen
- Occupations: Lutheran theologian; Preacher; Lecturer

Stephan Gerlach (Latin: Stephanus Gerlachius) was a German Lutheran theologian. Gerlach was an extremely important figure in the second half of the 16th century.

He was tasked with a special mission in Constantinople, namely to establish an alliance between Orthodoxy and Lutheranism against Catholicism. This mission failed, nevertheless, he signed the Brest Union.

From 1573 to 1578 he was in Constantinople as the first assistant and clergyman of the ambassador of the Holy Roman Empire - Baron David Ungnad von Sonnegg. He wrote a diary, one of the most cited sources in the historical literature about the situation in Constantinople in recent years of the "Kingdom of the Slavs", i.e. after the death of Selim II and just before the outbreak of the Long Turkish War.

Upon his return, he became professor of theology (1586) and head of the Protestant district in Tübingen, and he wrote against Calvinists and Jesuits. He died in Tübingen in 1612.

Gerlach purchased a few Greek manuscripts from the library of Michael Cantacuzenus and sent them to Germany.

Stefan Gerlach's diary was published in full in German only in 1674, thanks to his grandson Samuel Gerlach, who collected, arranged and translated into German his "Turkish diary" of his grandfather, inserting a number of translated primary documents translated, including letters and more.

Today, the diary is a bibliographical rarity that has not been republished in German and has never been translated into English. Parts of the diary have been published in other languages.

== Works ==
- Antidanæus at Google Books.
- Assertio Piae Sanaeqve Doctrinae De Divina Maiestate Christi Hominis at Google Books.
- De Coena Domini at Google Books.
- De Christo mediatore disputatio opposita perniciosis erroribus papistarum & Calvinianorum... at Google Books.
- Decertatio cum Lamberti Danaei profano milite, quem Clibanarium vocat at Google Books.
- Disputatio de Adventu, Persona, Officio et Regno Promissi Messiae at Google Books.
- Disputatio De Carne Christi Vivifica at Google Books.
- Disputatio de Communicatione Idiomatum Duarum Naturarum in Christo at Google Books.
- Disputatio de Creatione at Google Books.
- Disputatio, De Electione Credentivm Opposita Huberianismo, Sev Novis Corrvptelis Et Praestigiis Samvelis Hvberi Bernatis at Google Books.
- Disputatio De Persona Christi, Eivsqve Vt Hominis Divina Maiestate at Google Books.
- Disputatio de Vera et Catholica Christi in Terris Ecclesia at Google Books.
- Disputatio Opposita Scholasticorum quorundam Erroribus at Google Books.
- Disputatio Theologica de jejunio, opposita erroribus Roberti Bellarmini at Google Books.
- Dissertatio de Jejunio at Google Books.
- Hyperaspistes Antidanaei at Google Books.
- Propositiones De Inferno Et Aeterna Impiorum Damnatione at Google Books.
- Propositiones de Vera et Reali Praesentia Corporis et Sanguinis Christi in s. coena at Google Books.
- Refutatio Errorum, Absurditatum, Mendaciorum, Et Depravationum at Google Books.
- Stephan Gerlachs deß Aeltern Tage-Buch... at Google Books.
- Theses de Prophetis at Google Books.
- Theses de Providentia Dei at Google Books.
- Theses de Sacra Scriptura, contra Robertum Bellarminum at Google Books.
