= Jeremias II of Constantinople =

Ecumenical patriarch of Constantinople

- Ecumenical Patriarch of Constantinople
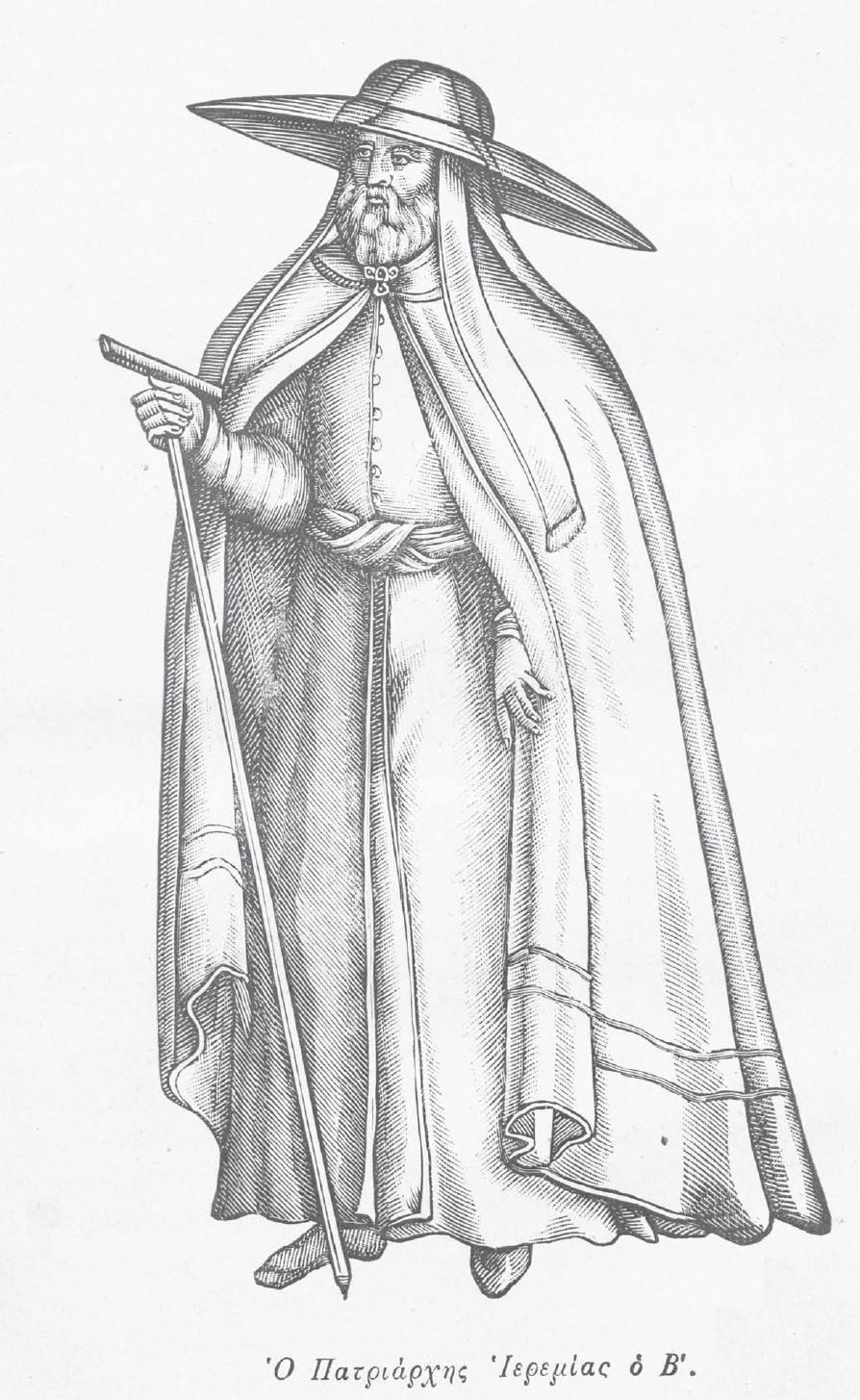
- Jeremias II of Constantinople, 19th-century drawing
- Church: Church of Constantinople
- In office: 5 May 1572 – 23 November 1579; 13 August 1580 – 22 February 1584; April 1587 – 4 September 1595
- Predecessor: Metrophanes III of Constantinople; Metrophanes III of Constantinople; Theoleptus II of Constantinople
- Successor: Metrophanes III of Constantinople; Pachomius II of Constantinople; Matthew II of Constantinople
- Previous post: Bishop of Larissa

Orders
- Consecration: c. 1568

Personal details
- Born: Jeremias Tranos c. 1530 Anchialos
- Died: 4 September 1595 Constantinople
- Denomination: Eastern Orthodoxy

Jeremias II of Constantinople (Greek: Ἰερεμίας Τρανός; c. 1530 – 4 September 1595) was Ecumenical Patriarch of Constantinople three times between 1572 and 1595.

== Life ==
Jeremias Tranos was born in Anchialos, from an influential Greek family. The year of his birth is not known, most probably 1530, but some scholars suggest 1536. He studied with the best Greek teachers of his age, and in his youth he became a monk. Supported by the rich Michael Kantakouzenos Şeytanoğlu, he was appointed bishop of Larissa on about 1568.

When Michael Kantakouzenos Şeytanoğlu obtained the deposition of Patriarch Metrophanes III of Constantinople, Jeremias, supported by Michael Kantakouzenos Şeytanoğlu, was elected for the first time to the Patriarchate on 5 May 1572. Jeremias II's first concern was the reform of his Church, and he summoned a synod with the aim to root out simony. He also restored his cathedral, that at the time was the Pammakaristos Church. During his first reign, Jeremias II also had the first contacts with the Lutherans which ended in a deadlocked disagreement. On 3 March 1578 his patron, Michael Kantakouzenos Şeytanoğlu was executed, and so Jeremias II's position became weak. On 23 November 1579 Jeremias II was deposed and excommunicated, and Metrophanes III returned on the Patriarchal throne.

Metrophanes III died on 9 August 1580, and Jeremias II returned for the second time on the throne, probably on 13 August. From 1580 to 1583 there were contacts between Jeremias II and envoys of the Pope in regard to the introduction in Greece of the Gregorian calendar: Rome was almost sure about a positive solution, but on the contrary the final position of Jeremias II was negative. In 1584 Jeremias II offered as a gift to Pope Gregory XIII two pieces of relics from the bodies of Saint John Chrysostom and Saint Andrew of Crete.

In the winter between 1583 and 1584 Jeremias II was subject of a conspiracy of some Greek bishops against him, led by Pachomius of Kaisaria and Theoleptus of Philippoupolis, that accused him to have supported a Greek uprising against the Ottoman Empire, to have baptised a muslim and to be in correspondence with the papacy. Jeremias II was arrested and beaten, and three trials followed: the first charge resulted false, but the last resulted in his deposition on 22 February 1584 and in his exile in Rhodes.

Thanks to the intercession of the French ambassador, in 1586 Jeremias II obtained freedom from his exile in Rhodes and started his travel through the Polish–Lithuanian Commonwealth (which included also Ukraine) and the Tsardom of Russia to raise funds. During his travels, he arrived in Moscow on 11 July 1588, and after negotiations with Boris Godunov (the Regent for Tsar Feodor I of Russia) on 26 January 1589 Patriarch Job of Moscow was enthroned as the first Patriarch of Moscow and all Rus'. Patriarch Jeremias II recognised the Russian Orthodox Church. On his way back to Constantinople, Jeremias II deposed the Metropolitan of Kiev Onesiphorus Devochka, and in his place appointed and consecrated Michael Rohoza.

In the meantime, after 1584 Jeremias II's deposition of two other patriarchs followed, Pachomius II and Theoleptus II, who was deposed in May 1586. The Church was governed by a supporter of Jeremias II, deacon Nicephorus (died 1596), and for ten days by deacon Dionysios Skylosophos (later metropolitan of Larissa). In April 1587 Jeremias II was formally re-elected as Patriarch, but due to his absence for his travel the Church went on being governed by the replacement cleric, deacon Nicephorus. On 4 July 1589, the Sultan formally appointed Jeremias II as Patriarch of Constantinople (for the third time). Jeremias II was informed to be again elected patriarch only in 1589 in Moldova when he was on the way back to Constantinople where he arrived in 1590.

On 12 February 1593, a synod in Constantinople sanctioned the autocephaly of the Patriarchate of Moscow. The exact date of Jeremias II's death is not known, but it occurred between September and December 1595, in Constantinople.

== Greek Augsburg Confession ==
From 1576 to 1581 he conducted the first important theological exchanges between Orthodoxy and Protestants. On 24 May 1575, Lutherans Jakob Andreae and Martin Crusius from Tübingen presented the Patriarch with a translated copy of the Augsburg Confession. Jeremias II wrote three rebuttals known as "Answers", which established that the Eastern Orthodox Church had no desire for reformation. The Lutherans replied to the first two letters, but the third letter ended in a deadlocked disagreement between the parties. The significance of the exchanges were that they presented, for the first time in a precise and clear way, where the Orthodox and Reformation churches stood in relation to each other.

== Notes and references ==
Eastern Orthodox Church titles
Preceded by Metrophanes III	Ecumenical Patriarch of Constantinople; 1572 – 1579	Succeeded by Metrophanes III (2)
Preceded by Metrophanes III (2)	Ecumenical Patriarch of Constantinople; 1580 – 1584	Succeeded by Pachomius II
Preceded by Theoleptus II	Ecumenical Patriarch of Constantinople; 1587 – 1595	Succeeded by Matthew II
