= Pachomius I of Constantinople =

Ecumenical Patriarch of Constantinople from 1503 to 1513

- Ecumenical Patriarch of Constantinople
- Church: Church of Constantinople
- In office: Early 1503 – early 1504; Autumn 1504 – early 1513
- Predecessor: Nephon II of Constantinople; Joachim I of Constantinople
- Successor: Joachim I of Constantinople; Theoleptus I of Constantinople
- Previous post: Metropolitan of Zichna

Personal details
- Died: 1513
- Denomination: Eastern Orthodoxy

Pachomius I of Constantinople (Greek: Παχώμιος; died 1513) was Ecumenical Patriarch of Constantinople from 1503 to 1513, except for a short period in 1504.

== Life ==
Before his election as Patriarch of Constantinople, Pachomius was Metropolitan of Zichna. When Patriarch Joachim I of Constantinople was deposed in 1502, the rulers of Wallachia, quite influential on the affairs of the Church of Constantinople, sponsored the election of the old Nephon II of Constantinople, who refused. Thus they transferred their support to Pachomius I, who was elected in early 1503. His first reign lasted only about one year because in early 1504 Joachim I returned to the throne after a payment of 3500 gold pieces to the Sultan.

Joachim I died shortly later during a travel in Wallachia and so in autumn 1504 Pachomius I, always supported by the rulers of Wallachia, returned to the throne. The second reign of Pachomius I lasted about nine years, a long period in comparison with the reigns of the patriarchs in the 15th century.

The main issue during Pachomius I's patriarchate was the case of the Cretan scholar Arsenius Apostolius. In 1506 the Roman Curia appointed Arsenius as Byzantine Rite bishop of Monemvasia, at that time part of the Stato da Màr of the Republic of Venice. Arsenius declared himself in communion both with the Patriarch of Constantinople and with the Catholic Church. This position was untenable for the Church of Constantinople and Pachomius I invited Arsenius to abdicate. The issue went on for more than two years until June 1509 when Pachomius I excommunicated Arsenius, who retired to Venice.

During the last year of his patriarchate, Pachomius I visited Wallachia and Moldavia. On the way back, already in Selymbria, Pachomius I was poisoned by Theodolus, a monk at his service. Pachomius I died immediately, in early 1513.

== Notes and references ==
Eastern Orthodox Church titles
Preceded by Nephon II (3)	Ecumenical Patriarch of Constantinople; 1503 – 1504	Succeeded by Joachim I (2)
Preceded by Joachim I (2)	Ecumenical Patriarch of Constantinople; 1504 – 1513	Succeeded by Theoleptus I
