= Joasaph II of Constantinople =

Ecumenical Patriarch of Constantinople from 1556 to 1565

- Ecumenical Patriarch of Constantinople
- Church: Church of Constantinople
- In office: July or August 1556 – 15 January 1565
- Predecessor: Dionysius II of Constantinople
- Successor: Metrophanes III of Constantinople
- Previous post: Metropolitan of Adrianopolis

Personal details
- Born: Thrace
- Died: After 1565 Adrianopolis
- Denomination: Eastern Orthodoxy

Joasaph II of Constantinople, known as "the Magnificent" (Greek: Ἰωάσαφ ὁ Μεγαλοπρεπής; died after 1565), was Ecumenical Patriarch of Constantinople from 1556 to 1565.

== Life ==
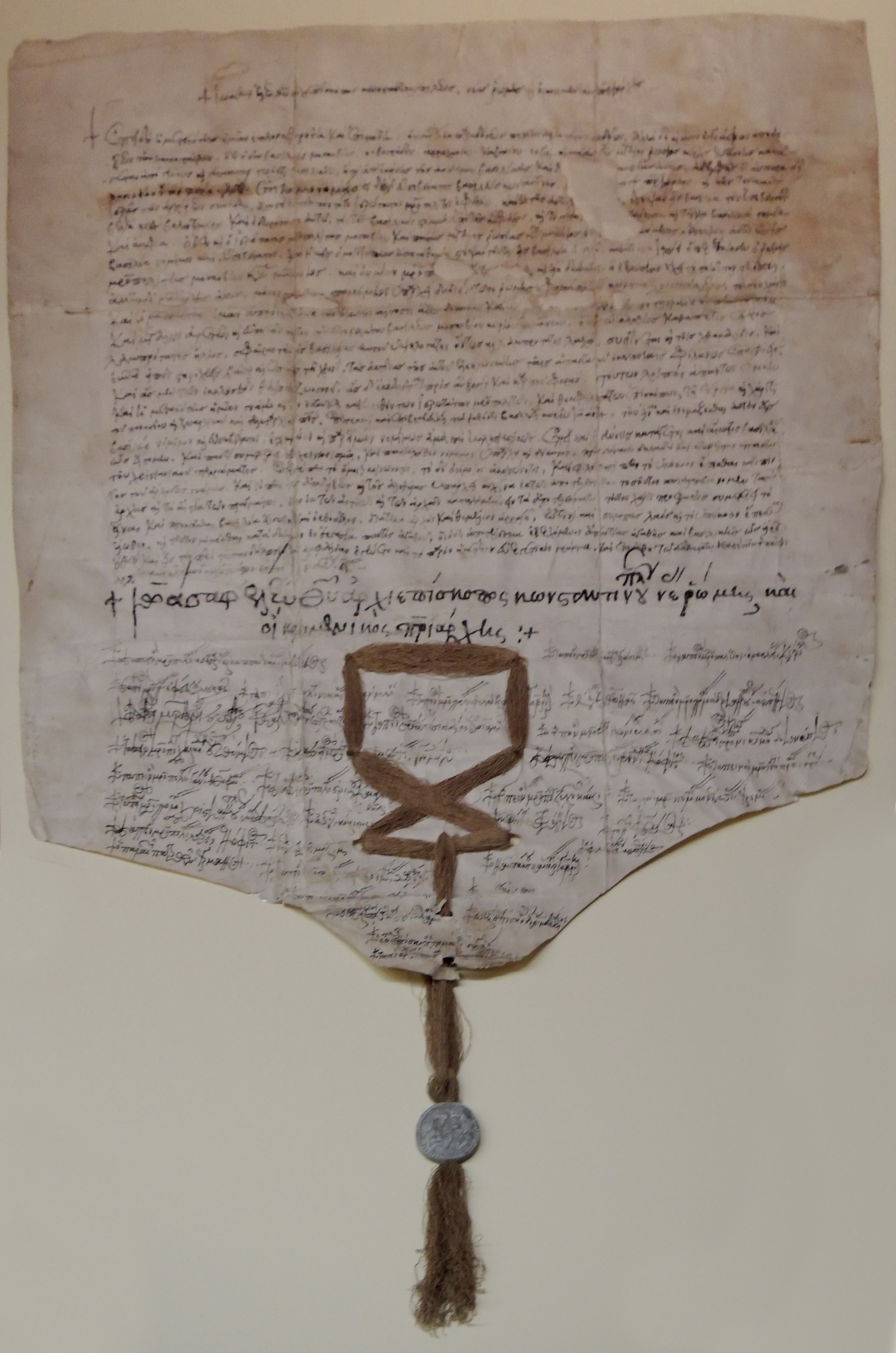
Charter from Patriarch Joasaph II and the Synod of the Patriarchate of Constantinople confirming the title of "Tsar" for Ivan the Terrible, December 1560

Joasaph was born in Thrace. He studied in Ioannina and then in Nafplio, learning Arabic, Persian and Turkish. In 1535 he was consecrated bishop of Adrianople by Patriarch Jeremias I of Constantinople.

After the death of the Dionysius II of Constantinople, he was elected Ecumenical Patriarch of Constantinople in July or August 1556. He was successful in reducing the appointment fee (peshtesh) due to the Ottoman Sultan to one thousand Écus.

Joasaph II promoted learning among the clergy, reformed the administration of the Church assets, and improved the finances reducing by half the debts of the Patriarchate. He also began a major enlargement of the Patriarchal palace. Due to these achievements, he was given the sobriquet the Magnificent (Greek: ὁ Μεγαλοπρεπής). In 1556 he established in Constantinople a Patriarchal School, the forerunner of the Great School of the Nation.

He showed interest in the Protestant Reformation, in particular Lutheranism, and in 1558 he sent to Wittenberg the Serbian deacon Dimitrije Ljubavić to collect information. In 1559 the Lutheran theologian Philip Melanchthon sent him a letter along with a Greek translation of the Augsburg Confession, but it didn't produce any effect. Some scholars suggest that Melanchthon's letter never reached Constantinople.

Joasaph II's expensive works, his haughty manner towards the clergy and his independent management of the finances created many opponents among the Greek community. The ultimate cause of his deposition was related to the request, in 1557, by Ivan the Terrible of Russia to have his title of Tsar formally confirmed. In place of summoning a synod to deliberate the issue, Joasaph II sent to Russia a counterfeit synodical document in order to collect the rich reward for himself. His deceit was discovered, and he was deposed by a synod of sixty bishops on 15 January 1565 and exiled to Mount Athos.

Some time later he was allowed by the Holy Synod to be reinstated in the Diocese of Adrianopolis, where he remained until his death.

== Notes and references ==
Eastern Orthodox Church titles
| Preceded by Dionysius II | Ecumenical Patriarch of Constantinople; 1556 – 1565 | Succeeded by Metrophanes III |
