= Dionysius II of Constantinople =

Ecumenical Patriarch of Constantinople from 1546 to 1556

- Ecumenical Patriarch of Constantinople
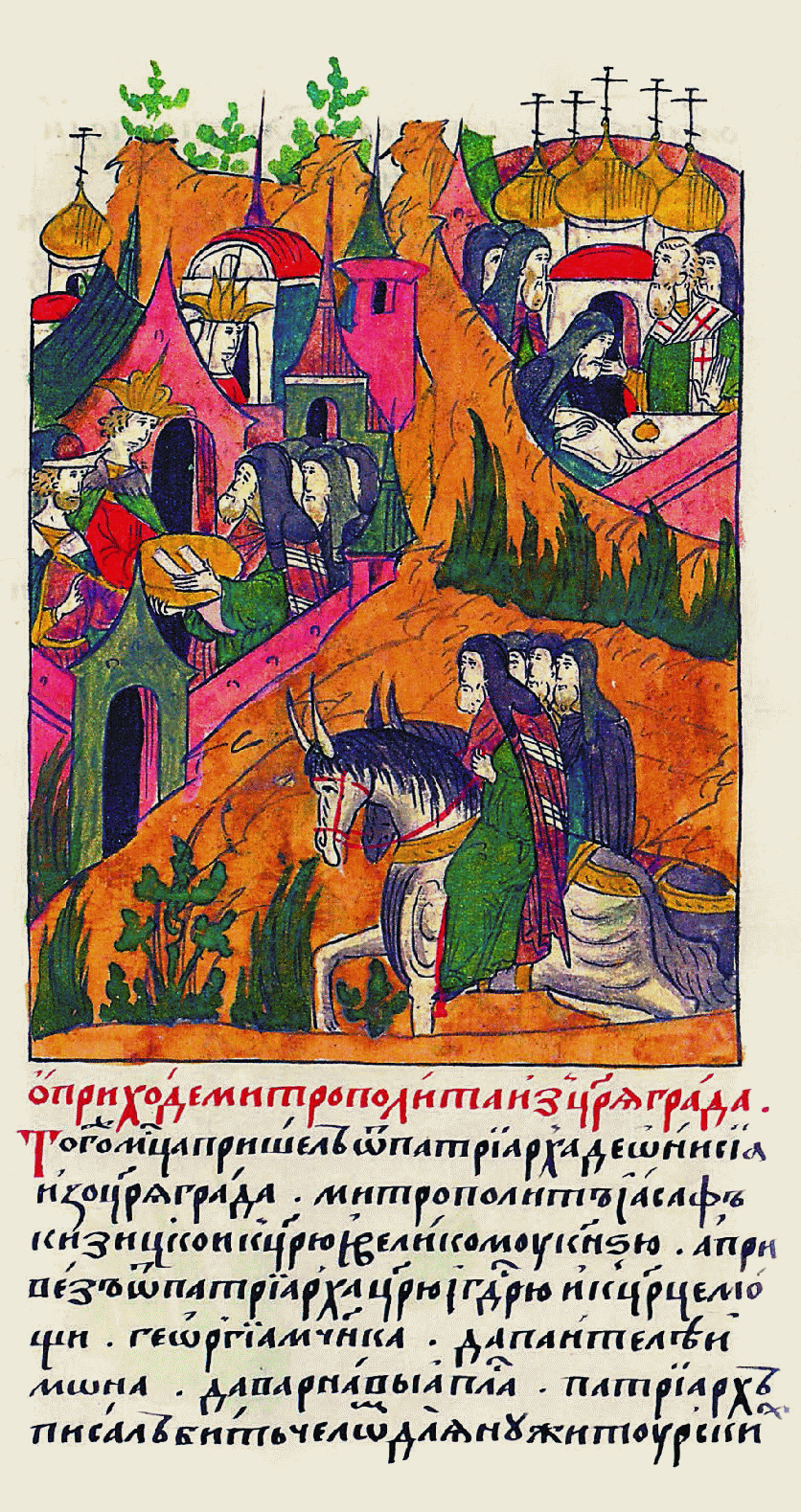
- Dionysius II sending Joasaph II, metropolitan of Cyzicus, as ambassador to Ivan the Terrible
- Church: Church of Constantinople
- Elected: 17 April 1546 – July 1556
- Predecessor: Jeremias I of Constantinople
- Successor: Joasaph II of Constantinople
- Previous post: Metropolis of Nicomedia

Personal details
- Died: July 1556 Galata (Constantinople)
- Denomination: Eastern Orthodoxy

Dionysius II of Constantinople (Greek: Διονύσιος; died July 1556) was Ecumenical Patriarch of Constantinople from 1546 to 1556.

== Life ==
Dionysius was born in Galata (now part of Istanbul). In 1516 he was appointed Metropolis of Nicomedia and he was consecrated bishop by Patriarch Theoleptus I of Constantinople.

Dionysius was designed by Patriarch Jeremias I of Constantinople as his successor, and, after Jeremias I's death, he was actually elected on 17 April 1546 supported by popular manifestations and against the hopes of the Holy Synod. During his Patriarchate he was blamed for having raised the appointment fee (peshtesh) due to the Ottoman Sultan to three thousand Écus and for the demolition, ordered by the Sultan, of the great cross on the roof of the Pammakaristos Church, at the time the seat of the Patriarchate.

The more significant event of his patriarchate was the 1546 travel in Italy of the young Metropolitan of Caesaria, Metrophanes III of Constantinople, who years later would become Patriarch. Dionysius II sent Metrophanes to Venice mainly to raise funds, but Metrophanes went also to Rome and met the Pope. In 1548 these news caused a great concern in a part of the Greek population of Constantinople, with riots and an attempt to murder Dionysius II, who was considered as guilty as Metrophanes. Dionysius II was on the point of being deposed, but no actions were taken against him because he enjoyed the support of Suleiman the Magnificent.

Dionysius II reigned until he died. The date of his death is disputed among scholars, and various dates have been proposed, such as 1554 and 1555, but the correct date seems to be July 1556, a conclusion supported by Republic of Venice documents. He was buried in the Kamariotissa Monastery on the island of Chalki.

== Bibliography ==
- Frazee, Charles A. (2006) [1983]. Catholics and Sultans - The Church and the Ottoman Empire 1453–1923. Cambridge: Cambridge University Press. ISBN 9780521027007.

Eastern Orthodox Church titles
| Preceded by Jeremias I (2) | Ecumenical Patriarch of Constantinople; 1546 – 1556 | Succeeded by Joasaph II |
