= Metrophanes III of Constantinople =

Ecumenical Patriarch of Constantinople from 1565 to 1572 and from 1579 to 1580

- Ecumenical Patriarch of Constantinople
- Church: Church of Constantinople
- In office: January / February 1565 – 4 May 1572; 25 November 1579 – 9 August 1580
- Predecessor: Joasaph II of Constantinople; Jeremias II of Constantinople
- Successor: Jeremias II of Constantinople; Jeremias II of Constantinople
- Previous post: Metropolitan of Caesaria

Personal details
- Born: 1520 Agia Paraskevi
- Died: 9 August 1580 (aged 59–60) Constantinople
- Denomination: Eastern Orthodoxy

Metrophanes III of Constantinople (Greek: Μητροφάνης ὁ Βυζάντιος; 1520 – 9 August 1580) was Ecumenical Patriarch of Constantinople two times, from 1565 to 1572 and from 1579 to 1580.

== Life ==
Metrophanes was born in 1520 to a Bulgarian merchant father in the village of Agia Paraskevi (now part of Istanbul), from where he took the sobriquet Byzantios ("of Byzantium"). His original name is variously given as Manuel or George.

In 1546 he was appointed Metropolitan of Caesarea by his personal friend Patriarch Dionysius II of Constantinople, who sent him to Venice mainly to raise funds, but Metrophanes went also to Rome and met the Pope. In 1548 this news caused a great concern in a part of the Greek population of Constantinople, with riots and an attempt to murder Dionysius II who was considered as guilty as Metrophanes. Dionysius II was on the point of being deposed, but no actions was taken against him because he enjoyed the support of Suleiman the Magnificent. Metrophanes was deposed from his See of Caesarea, but in 1551 he was forgiven and he went to live in the Monastery of the Holy Trinity in the island of Chalki where he took care of and enlarged the library.

He was elected Patriarch the first time in January or February 1565 supported by the rich and influential Michael Kantakouzenos Şeytanoğlu. He reigned for seven years and tried to improve the finances of the Patriarchate also through a trip in Moldavia. He was an open-minded man of letters, and well disposed towards the Westerners, both Catholic and Protestant. In 1568, Metrophanes III issued a strong condemnation in an encyclical letter concerning mistreatment of Jews in Crete, stating:

"Injustice ... regardless to whomever acted upon or performed against, is still injustice. The unjust person is never relieved of the responsibility of these acts under the pretext that the injustice is done against a heterodox and not to a believer. As our Lord Jesus Christ in the Gospels said do not oppress or accuse anyone falsely; do not make any distinction or give room to the believers to injure those of another belief".

He was deposed on 4 May 1572 when Michael Kantakouzenos Şeytanoğlu transferred his support to the young and brilliant Jeremias II of Constantinople. After his deposition, to grant him a financial revenue, he was appointed bishop eis zoarkeian (i.e. without pastoral obligations) of Larissa and Chios, and he returned to live in the Monastery of the Holy Trinity in the island of Chalki, near the capital.

After his attempts to return to the throne, in 1573 he was exiled to Mount Athos. Six years later, after the execution of Michael Kantakouzenos Şeytanoğlu and the murder of the Grand vizier Sokollu Mehmed Pasha, Jeremias II lost his supporters and Metrophanes III was successfully restored on the throne on 25 November 1579. He died a few months later, on 9 August 1580, and was buried in the Pammakaristos Church, at the time the patriarchal cathedral.

== Bibliography ==
- Frazee, Charles A. (2006) [1983]. Catholics and Sultans: The Church and the Ottoman Empire 1453–1923. Cambridge University Press. ISBN 9780521027007.

Religious titles
Preceded by Joasaph II	Ecumenical Patriarch of Constantinople; 1565 – 1572	Succeeded by Jeremias II
Preceded by Jeremias II	Ecumenical Patriarch of Constantinople; 1579 – 1580	Succeeded by Jeremias II
