= Joachim I of Constantinople =

Ecumenical Patriarch of Constantinople from 1498 to 1502 and in 1504

- Ecumenical Patriarch of Constantinople
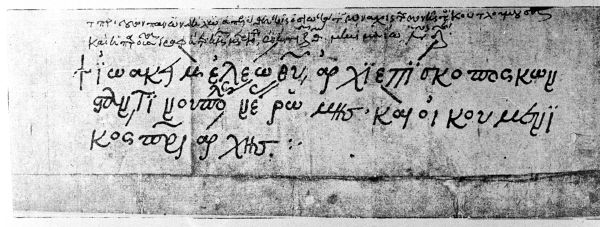
- Signature of Joachim I
- Church: Church of Constantinople
- In office: Autumn 1498 – spring 1502; Early 1504 – autumn 1504
- Predecessor: Nephon II of Constantinople; Pachomius I of Constantinople
- Successor: Nephon II of Constantinople; Pachomius I of Constantinople
- Previous post: Metropolitan of Drama, Greece

Personal details
- Died: 1504
- Denomination: Eastern Orthodoxy

Joachim I of Constantinople (Greek: Ἰωακείμ; died 1504) was Ecumenical Patriarch of Constantinople from 1498 to 1502 and for a short time in 1504.

== Life ==
Concerning the early life of Joachim before he became Patriarch of Constantinople, we know that he was Metropolitan of Drama and that he was young, not particularly learned but very able in ecclesiastic matters and striking for virtue. In autumn 1498 he was elected as Patriarch with the support of king Constantine II of Georgia, taking the place of Patriarch Nephon II of Constantinople who in turn was supported by the rulers of Wallachia. Georgia was Christian country independent from the Ottoman Empire and semi-autonomous from a religious point of view, but which could sometimes apply impressive influence on the patriarchal elections.

As Patriarch, Joachim I was quite popular with his flock, while he was on the road to Georgia to raise funds, the Metropolitan of Selymbria offered the Sultan one thousand gold pieces to be appointed Patriarch in Joachim I's place, but the faithful collected the same amount among themselves and paid it to the Sultan to avoid Joachim I's deposition. In spring 1502, Joachim I was however deposed by Sultan Bayezid II when the latter discovered that Joachim I had ordered the building of a Christian church of stone without his permission.

After Joachim I's deposition, the new Patriarch-elect was again Nephon II, who however refused the office. Then the rulers of Wallachia moved their support to Patriarch Pachomius I of Constantinople, who was elected in early 1503 and reigned for about one year, until early 1504 when the friends of Joachim I collected 3500 gold pieces to restore him on the throne (500 pieces more than the usual fee paid to the Sultan for each patriarchal appointment).

Joachim I's second patriarchate lasted only a few months, shortly after being elected, Joachim I traveled north trying to restore friendly relations with his political enemies, but both Radu IV the Great of Wallachia and Bogdan III the One-Eyed of Moldavia refused to reconcile with him. Joachim I died in 1504 during his sojourn in Wallachia, in Târgoviște or in Drista, and he was succeeded again by Pachomius I.

== Notes and references ==
Eastern Orthodox Church titles
Preceded by Nephon II	Ecumenical Patriarch of Constantinople; 1498 – 1502	Succeeded by Nephon II
Preceded by Pachomius I	Ecumenical Patriarch of Constantinople; 1504	Succeeded by Pachomius I
