= Peter Lauremberg =

Peter Lauremberg (26 August 1585 – 13 May 1639) was a writer, professor and rector at the University of Rostock in the seventeenth century.

== Life ==
Son of another professor, Wilhelm Lauremberg, Peter Lauremberg was born in Rostock in 1585, and like his father before him he studied medicine and astronomy at Rostock, where he earned his Master's degree in 1607. The following year he began his medical studies at Leiden. He travelled in Belgium and France, tutoring, and in 1611 took out his Doctor of Medicine in Paris. His first university appointment was at the University of Montauban where he taught philosophy.

Three years later he left France to return home and take up a position teaching mathematics and physics at the Hamburg Akademische Gymnasium. Like his younger brother Johann Lauremberg, he was drawn to poetry, and in 1624 became professor of poetry, mathematics and medicine at the University of Rostock, where he was elected rector in 1635. He remained in Rostock until his death in 1639.

== Publications ==
Peter Lauremberg's academic interests were versatile, and he wrote a large number of books on a wide variety of topics, in addition to nearly 700 articles in his Kuriositäten-Anthologie, the first of its kind in the German language. He produced an encyclopedia in 1633 under the name Pansophia, sive Paedia Philosophica, disseminating the term Pansophia which was adopted by Comenius as a term for his proposed movement to unify science and religion.

== Selected works ==
- Procestria anatomica. Hamburg 1619
- Institutiones Arithmeticae. Hamburg 1621
- Institutiones arithmeticæ (1621)
- Porticus Aesculapi Rostock 1630
- De Plantis Bulbosis (1632)
- Apparatus plantarius: de plantis bulbosis et de plantis tuberosis (in Latin). Frankfurt: Matthias Merian. 1632.
- Horticultura. Frankfurt 1632
- Pansophia, sive Paedia Philosophica (1633)
- Acerra philologica 1637

== Bibliography ==
- Thomas Bürger: Die „Acerra philologica“ des Peter Lauremberg. In: Wolfenbütteler Notizen zur Buchgeschichte, 12 (1987), pp. 1–24
- Gerhard Dünnhaupt: Peter Lauremberg (1585–1639). In: Personalbibliographien zu den Drucken des Barock. Vol. 4. Hiersemann, Stuttgart 1991, ISBN 3-7772-9122-6, pp. 2531–2564
- Conrad Wiedemann: Vorspiel der Anthologie. In: J. Bark, D. Pforte (eds.): Die deutschsprachige Anthologie. Vol. 2. Frankfurt am Main 1969, pp. 28–29
- Charles A. Williams: Peter Lauremberg and Fischart. In: Modern Language Notes, 33 (1918), pp. 120–121
- Teichmann, G (November 1992). "William Harvey, Peter Lauremberg and cardiac output". International Journal of Clinical Pharmacology, Therapy, and Toxicology. 30 (11): 419–20. PMID 1490765.
