= Invasion of Shikoku (1585) =

Conflict of the Sengoku Period of Japan

Invasion of Shikoku & Siege of Ichinomiya
- Part of the Sengoku period
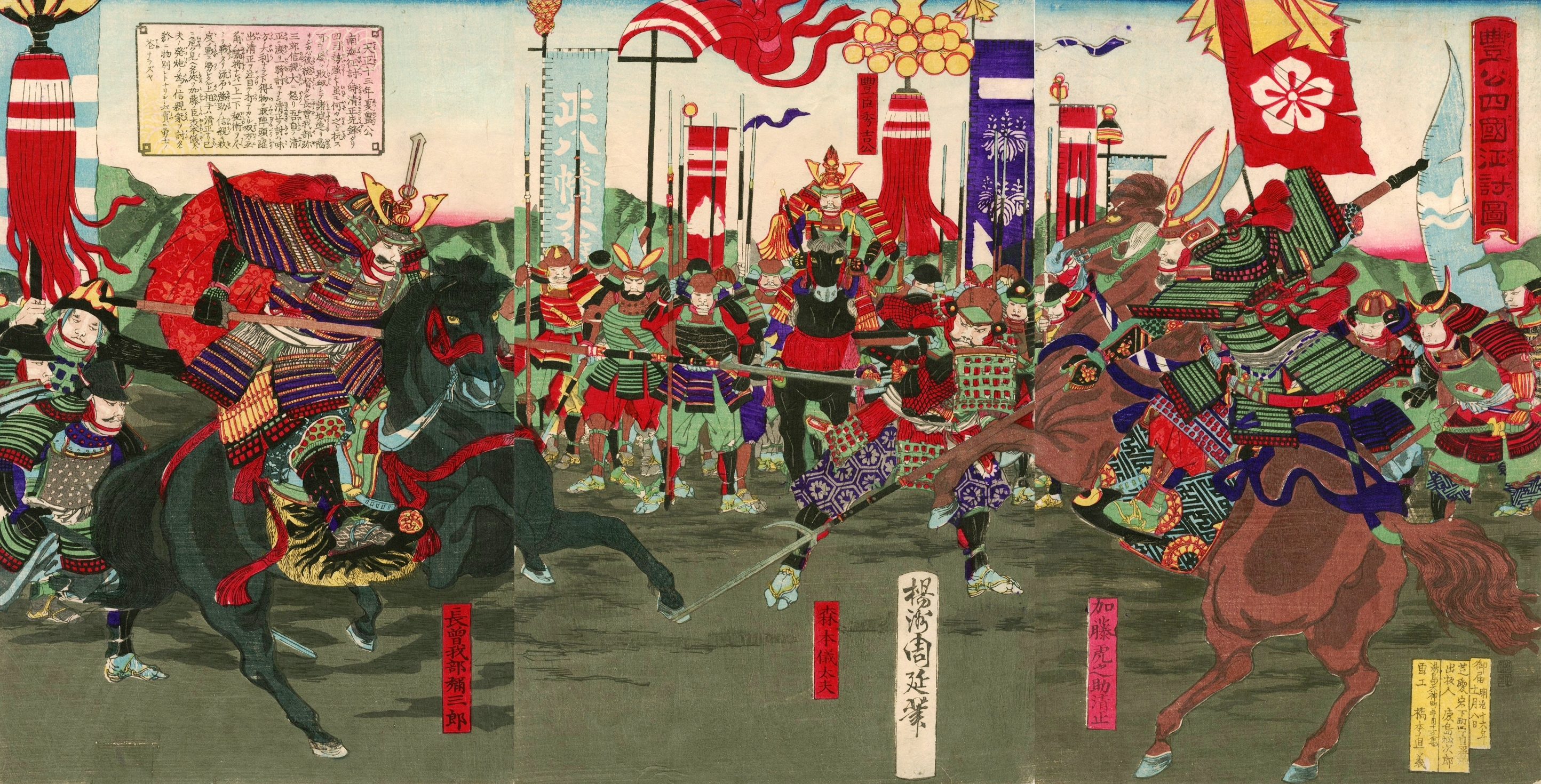
- Hōkō Shikoku Seitō no zu by Toyohara Chikanobu (1883), a Meiji period ukiyo-e depicting Hideyoshi's conquest of Shikoku.
Date	June – August 1585
Location	Shikoku, Japan
Result	Toyotomi victory: Toyotomi conquest of Shikoku

Belligerents
Forces of Toyotomi Hideyoshi	Forces of Chōsokabe clan

Commanders and leaders
Toyotomi Hidenaga; Toyotomi Hidetsugu; Ukita Hideie; Kikkawa Motoharu; Kobayakawa Takakage; Sogō Masayasu; Sengoku Hidehisa; Ankokuji Ekei; Kuroda Yoshitaka; Konishi Yukinaga; Hori Hidemasa; Hachisuka Iemasa; Akamatsu Norifusa; Mizuno Katsushige	Chōsokabe Motochika; Chōsokabe Nobuchika; Kagawa Chikakazu; Kōsokabe Chikayasu

Strength
113,000 men	40,000

The Invasion of Shikoku (四国平定, Shikoku heitei) was a conflict of the Sengoku period of Japan fought between Toyotomi Hideyoshi and Chōsokabe Motochika on the island of Shikoku in 1585. Hideyoshi invaded Shikoku with a force of over 100,000 men in June and led a campaign against the Chōsokabe clan force of 40,000 men for control over the island. Hideyoshi's army was successful and conquered most of Shikoku within two months, and defeated Chōsokabe when he surrendered Ichinomiya Castle in August.

== Background ==
In the 1570s, Chōsokabe Motochika launched a campaign to personally unify Shikoku, the smallest of Japan's four main islands, and defeated a number of samurai rivals over the next decade. In 1580, Chōsokabe came into conflict with Oda Nobunaga after rejecting a request to submit to him.

By 1583, Chōsokabe was the most powerful warlord on Shikoku and had conquered most of the island's four provinces of Iyo, Sanuki, Awa, and Tosa. That year, Chōsokabe had defeated Sengoku Hidehisa, a retainer of Nobunaga's successor Toyotomi Hideyoshi, at the Battle of Hiketa. By this point, Hideyoshi had become the most powerful warlord in Japan following the death of Nobunaga the previous year. Hideyoshi's position was insecure and his efforts were occupied on consolidating his rule on Honshu.

In 1584, Hideyoshi won a political victory against Tokugawa Ieyasu at the Battle of Komaki and Nagakute, securing his position as paramount warlord. Hideyoshi began expanding his rule from outside his base in central Honshu and decided to invade Shikoku.

== Invasion ==
In June, 1585, Hideyoshi amassed a giant army of 113,000 men to invade Shikoku and divided them into three forces. The first, under his half-brother Toyotomi Hidenaga and nephew Toyotomi Hidetsugu, consisted of 60,000 men, and assaulted the provinces of Awa and Tosa, approaching Shikoku via Akashi, Settsu Province. The second force was Ukita Hideie troops led by his uncle Ukita Tadaie, consisted of 23,000 men, and assaulted the province of Sanuki. The third force was led by Mōri "Two Rivers", Kobayakawa Takakage and Kikkawa Motoharu, consisted of 30,000 men, and advanced on the province of Iyo. In total, it took 600 larger ships and 103 smaller ships to transport Hideyoshi's army across the Seto Inland Sea to Shikoku.

Chōsokabe chose to fight to defend his territories with his force of 40,000 men, despite the overwhelming size of Hideyoshi's army and the suggestions of his advisors to submit. In June, Hideyoshi's army invaded Shikoku, winning a string of victories and securing many castles across the island over the next two months.

By August, Hideyoshi's invasion culminated in the siege of Ichinomiya Castle, with around 40,000 men under Hidenaga besieging the castle for 26 days. Hidenaga managed to destroy the water source of Ichinomiya Castle, and Chōsokabe half-heartedly tried to relieve the castle from siege, before Ichinomiya finally surrendered. With the surrender of the Ichinomiya castle, Chosokabe Motochika himself surrendered on the 11th day of the 7th month of Tenshō 13 (6 August 1585). Chosokabe was allowed to keep the province of Tosa, but the rest of the island was divided among Hideyoshi's generals.

== Aftermath ==
Chōsokabe was allowed to keep Tosa Province but stripped of the three other provinces of Shikoku, which were then divided among Hideyoshi's generals. Awa was given to Hachisuka Iemasa and Akamatsu Norifusa, Sanuki was given to Sengoku Hidehisa and Sogō Masayasu, and Iyo was given to Kobayakawa Takakage and other Mōri generals. Chōsokabe submitted as a retainer and general of Hideyoshi, participating in the Kyūshū campaign and Japanese invasions of Korea, and later became known for his involvement in the San Felipe incident.
