= Akamatsu Norifusa =

Japanese samurai

- 赤松 則房
- Born: 1559
- Died: August 18, 1598 (aged 38–39)
- Military career
- Allegiance: Oda clan Toyotomi clan
- Rank: shugo
- Unit: Akamatsu clan
- Commands: Harima Province
- Conflicts: Battle of Shizugatake (1583); Invasion of Shikoku (1585)

Akamatsu Norifusa (赤松 則房, Norifusa Akamatsu; 1559 – August 18, 1598) was a Japanese samurai of the Sengoku and Azuchi-Momoyama periods. Akamatsu clan was the shugo daimyō of Harima Province. His father was Akamatsu Yoshisuke.

Norifusa was defeated during Toyotomi Hideyoshi's Chugoku Offensive. He surrendered, becoming Hideyoshi's vassal; in subsequent years he was granted landholdings scattered around Okishio castle and Sumakichi (in Awa Province).

Under Hideyoshi's command, he saw action at the Battle of Shizugatake (1583) and the Invasion of Shikoku (1585).
