= Pachomius II of Constantinople =

Ecumenical Patriarch of Constantinople from 1584 to 1585

- Ecumenical Patriarch of Constantinople
- Church: Church of Constantinople
- In office: 22 February 1584 – February 1585
- Predecessor: Jeremias II of Constantinople
- Successor: Theoleptus II of Constantinople
- Previous post: Metropolitan of Caesarea

Personal details
- Born: Lesbos
- Died: After 1585 Wallachia
- Denomination: Eastern Orthodoxy

Pachomius II of Constantinople (Greek: Παχώμιος Πατέστος; died after 1585) was Ecumenical Patriarch of Constantinople from 1584 to 1585. He is sometimes considered an usurper.

== Life ==
Sixteenth-century Greek sources show an extended bias against Pachomius II, he is labeled as "dissolute" by Pseudo-Dorotheus and Leontios Eustrakios stated that he "inflicted immeasurable grief upon the Christians".

Pachomius was native of Lesbos. He was a man of great education, a scholar, and he served as a teacher of philosophy and mathematics of Sultan Mehmed III. Around 1580 he became rector of the Patriarchal Church in Constantinople. On about 1583 or 1584, thanks to the support of his brother, who was a wealthy merchant, he bought his election to the Metropolitanate of Caesarea. However, Patriarch Jeremias II of Constantinople, who as Patriarch had the right to validate any Metropolitan's appointment, refused to confirm and consecrate him.

Pachomius II led a group of Greek prelates who tried to overthrow Jeremias II, accusing the latter of having supported a Greek uprising against the Ottoman Empire, to have baptised a Muslim and to be in correspondence with the Papacy. Jeremias II was arrested and beaten, and three trials followed, the first charge was proven false, but the last resulted in his deposition on 22 February 1584. With a personal decision Sultan Mehmed III appointed Pachomius II as Patriarch of Constantinople. The appointment was due not only to Pachomius II's personal relationship with the Sultan but also to a promise to increase the annual tax paid by the Church to the Ottoman state.

During Pachomius II's patriarchate, a synod was held in Constantinople with the participation of Patriarch Sophronius IV of Jerusalem, which condemned the Gregorian calendar and exiled the former Patriarch Jeremias II, whom it charged not to have been opposed enough to the new calendar.

Same bishops tried to overthrow Pachomius II, offering to Sultan Murad III the great amount of 40,000 florins. The Sultan however received the same amount from friends of Pachomius II and kept him in place. Pachomius II remained unpopular with most of his flock; when he was due to pay the increased annual gift he had promised to the Sultan, he tried to collect it from the Orthodox faithful, who refused their help. To obtain money Pachomius II sold church properties, but he nevertheless failed to gather the promised amount. Pachomius II also failed to address the ongoing polemic launched against him by the deacon of Jeremias II, Nikephoros, who considered his election as illegal. Finally Pachomius II was deposed by a meeting of prelates on 26 or 27 February 1585, and the Sultan did not oppose to the synodal decision. Pachomius II was succeeded by Patriarch Theoleptus II of Constantinople, who had leagued with him in overthrowing Jeremias II the year before.

A year later Pachomius II was acquitted of the charges and was sent to Egypt and Cyprus to collect donations. During his travel Pachomius II was charged of immoral behavior, and he returned to Constantinople, where he worked and continued to pose problems. He was finally exiled in Wallachia, where he died.

== Notes and references ==
Eastern Orthodox Church titles
Preceded by Jeremias II (2)	Ecumenical Patriarch of Constantinople; 1484 – 1485	Succeeded by Theoleptus II
