= Nephon II of Constantinople =

Three-time Ecumenical Patriarch of Constantinople and Saint

Saint Nephon II of Constantinople
- Ecumenical Patriarch of Constantinople
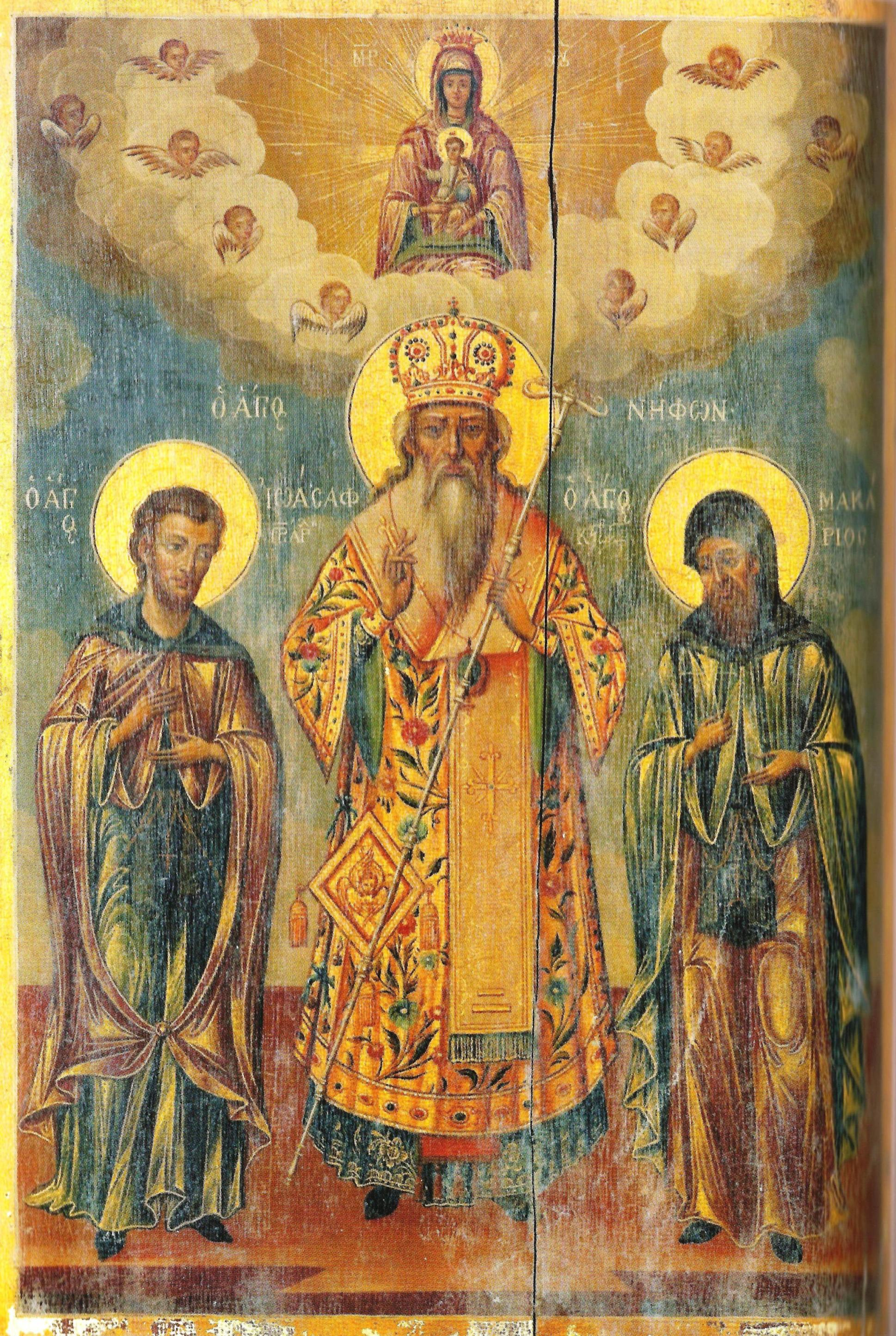
- Fresco depicting Nephon II (in the middle)
- Church: Church of Constantinople
- In office: Late 1486 – early 1488; 1497 – 1498; Spring 1502
- Predecessor: Symeon I of Constantinople; Maximus IV of Constantinople; Joachim I of Constantinople
- Successor: Dionysius I of Constantinople; Joachim I of Constantinople; Pachomius I of Constantinople
- Previous post: Metropolitan of Thessaloniki

Personal details
- Born: Peloponnese
- Died: 11 August 1508 Monastery of Dionysiou on Mount Athos

Sainthood
- Feast day: 11 August
- Venerated in: Eastern Orthodox Church

Nephon II of Constantinople (Nifon II (Greek: Νήφων; Albanian: Nifoni; died 11 August 1508), born Nicholas (Νικόλαος), was Ecumenical Patriarch of Constantinople three times: from 1486 to 1488, from 1497 to 1498 and for a short time in 1502. He is honored as a saint in the Eastern Orthodox Church and his feast day is 11 August.

== Life ==
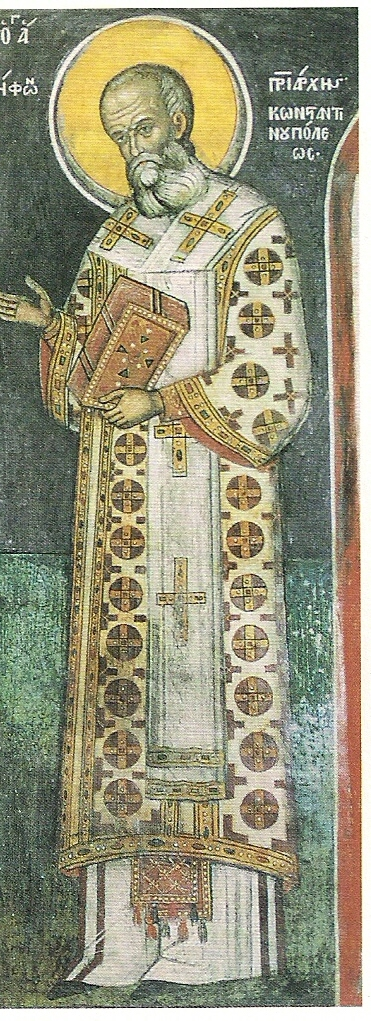
Fresco from Dionysiou Monastery, 1547

He was born in the Peloponnese peninsula in southern Greece to an Albanian father and a Greek mother. He was tonsured a monk at Epidaurus, taking the religious name of Nephon. He was involved in calligraphy and copying manuscripts. He then followed a monk named Zacharias and settled in the Monastery of the Theotokos in Ohrid. When Zacharias was elected Archbishop of Ohrid, Nephon went to Mount Athos and there he was ordained a hieromonk. In 1482 he was elected Metropolis of Thessaloniki and at the end of 1486 he was elected Patriarch of Constantinople, supported by the wealthy Prince of Wallachia, Vlad Călugărul, who thus inaugurated Wallachian participation in the history of external influences on the Patriarchate's election process.

After eighteen months a scandal arose, which led to Nephon II's removal. Specifically, the previous patriarch, Symeon I of Constantinople, died without making his will. İşkender Bey, one of the sons of Symeon's main sponsor, George Amiroutzes, had converted to Islam and was at the time the treasurer of the Sultan. He requested that all the inheritance of Symeon I, which included also ecclesiastic items, should pass to the Sultan's treasury. To avoid this, Nephon II pretended that a nephew of the deceased patriarch was the legitimate heir, finding three monks that bore false witness. After discovering the truth, Sultan Bayezid II confiscated the property of Symeon I, punished the clergy involved in the scandal, and exiled Nephon II. Nephon II was exiled to some island in the Black Sea off Sozopol and was deposed in the first months of 1488. According to scholar Steven Runciman, Nephon II was a foolish and unsatisfactory patriarch.

In summer 1497 Nephon II was elected for the second time to the patriarchal throne, always with the support of the Wallachian ruler Radu IV the Great, but his reign lasted only until August 1498 when he was overthrown by the young Joachim I of Constantinople, who was supported by king Constantine II of Georgia. Nephon II was sentenced to life imprisonment and exiled to Adrianople.

So great was the reputation of Nephon II that the Wallachian ruler Radu IV bowed down when he went to visit the jailed patriarch. Shortly after Radu obtained bail for Nephon II from the Ottoman Sultan. Nephon II moved to Wallachia, where he was given a warm welcome by the clergy and laity and where he immediately ordained two bishops. In 1502 the Holy Synod elected him Patriarch of Constantinople for the third time and sent emissaries to Wallachia to inform him, however Nephon II resolutely refused the appointment and did not return to Constantinople.

Between 1503 and 1505, Nephon II de facto led the Church of Wallachia, until he came into conflict with the Prince. The conflict arose because of the intransigence of the patriarch in refusing to celebrate the marriage of Radu's older sister Calpea with the Moldovan boyar Bogdan Logothete, who had already been married. Threatened by Radu, Nephon II gathered the people, made a speech, and excommunicated the groom. He also prophesied accidents, left the patriarchal vestments on the altar and departed the church, taking to a deserted hut. In order to avoid the outcry of the people, Radu tried to placate the old man with flattering words, promises and gifts and begged him to forgive his brother-in-law, but Nephon II remained adamant and left for Macedonia, taking with him two of his students. In Macedonia, he went through all the towns performing missionary preaching. On his return to Mount Athos, he appeared unrecognisable to the monks of the Monastery of Dionysiou, who initially thought him a simple herdsman.

Nephon II died in the Monastery of Dionysiou on Mount Athos in 1508. Immediately after his death, he was honored as a saint in many areas and the Eastern Orthodox Church recognised him as a saint just nine years later, in 1517, setting his feast day on 11 August. His relic is kept in a shrine in the Monastery of Dionysiou, where there is a chapel in his name.

== Bibliography ==
- Μωυσέως Μοναχού Αγιορείτου (2008). Οι Άγιοι του Αγίου Όρους. Εκδόσεις Μυγδονία. pp. 369–370. ISBN 978-960-7666-72-7.
- Προκοπίου Τσιμάνη, Από υψηλή σκοπιά οι Πατριάρχαι Κωνσταντινουπόλεως, Athens 1981, τόμ. Α΄, σελ, 105–109.
- Sathas, Konstantinos (1868). Νεοελληνική Φιλολογία: Βιογραφία των εν τοις γράμμασι διαλαμψάντων Ελλήνων, από της καταλύσεως της Βυζαντινής Αυτοκρατορίας μέχρι της Ελληνικής εθνεγερσίας (1453–1821). Athens: Τυπογραφείο των τέκνων Ανδρέου Κορομηλά.

Eastern Orthodox Church titles
Preceded by Symeon I (3)	Ecumenical Patriarch of Constantinople; 1486 – 1488	Succeeded by Dyonysius I (2)
Preceded by Maximus IV	Ecumenical Patriarch of Constantinople; 1497 – 1498	Succeeded by Joachim I
Preceded by Joachim I	Ecumenical Patriarch of Constantinople; 1464 – 1465	Succeeded by Pachomius I
