= Theoleptus II of Constantinople =

Ecumenical Patriarch of Constantinople from 1585 to 1586

- Ecumenical Patriarch of Constantinople
- Church: Church of Constantinople
- In office: 16 February 1585 – May 1586
- Predecessor: Pachomius II of Constantinople
- Successor: Jeremias II of Constantinople
- Previous post: Metropolitan of Philippoupolis

Personal details
- Died: After 1597
- Denomination: Eastern Orthodoxy

Theoleptus II of Constantinople (Greek: Θεόληπτος; died after 1597) was Ecumenical Patriarch of Constantinople from 1585 to 1586.

== Life ==
Theoleptus was a nephew of Patriarch Metrophanes III of Constantinople. He became Metropolitan of Philippopolis and although he had been helped by Patriarch Jeremias II of Constantinople, he conspired against him, leaguing with Pachomius II of Constantinople. When Pachomius II was deposed, Theoleptus was appointed Patriarch in his place, on 16 February 1585, and he was formally enthroned in March 1585 by the Patriarchs of Alexandria and Antioch.

In May 1586, while Theoleptus II was travelling in Moldavia and Wallachia to raise funds, Nicephorus (died 1596), a deacon of the exiled Patriarch Jeremias II, managed to dethrone him. Nicephorus became locum tenens of the throne until April 1587, when Jeremias II was re-elected of the Patriarchate even though he was absent from Constantinople in a long travel to Ukraine and Russia. Jeremias II was informed of his re-election only in 1589 in Moldova when he was on the way back to Constantinople; he arrived there in 1590. In the meantime the deacon Nicephorus went on governing the Church in name of Jeremias II. The term of Nicephorus was shortly interrupted for about ten days by the deacon Dionysios Skylosophos (later Metropolitan of Larissa, died 1611).

After April 1587, a synodal decision pardoned Theoleptus II and sent him to Iberia to raise money for the indebted Church. In 1587 Theoleptus II adopted a signet for the Soumela Monastery, but it is not known whether it was lawfully or unlawfully issued. Finally, it is known that Theoleptus II was reconciled with Jeremias II and that he helped the government of the Church until 1590. His fate after that is unknown.

Theoleptus II was the last Patriarch who had the see in the Pammakaristos Church, which was converted into a mosque in 1586. The Patriarchate moved on to the poor Church of Theotokos Paramythia (later in the precincts of the "Vlach Saray", the residence of the Valachian Hospodar in Constantinople), where it remained for eleven years, until 1597.

== Notes and references ==
Eastern Orthodox Church titles
Preceded by Pachomius II	Ecumenical Patriarch of Constantinople; 1585 – 1586	Succeeded by Jeremias II (3)
