= Ichinomiya Castle =

Building in Tokushima Prefecture, Japan

Coordinates: 34°02′03″N 134°27′48″E

- 一宮城
- Tokushima, Tokushima, Japan
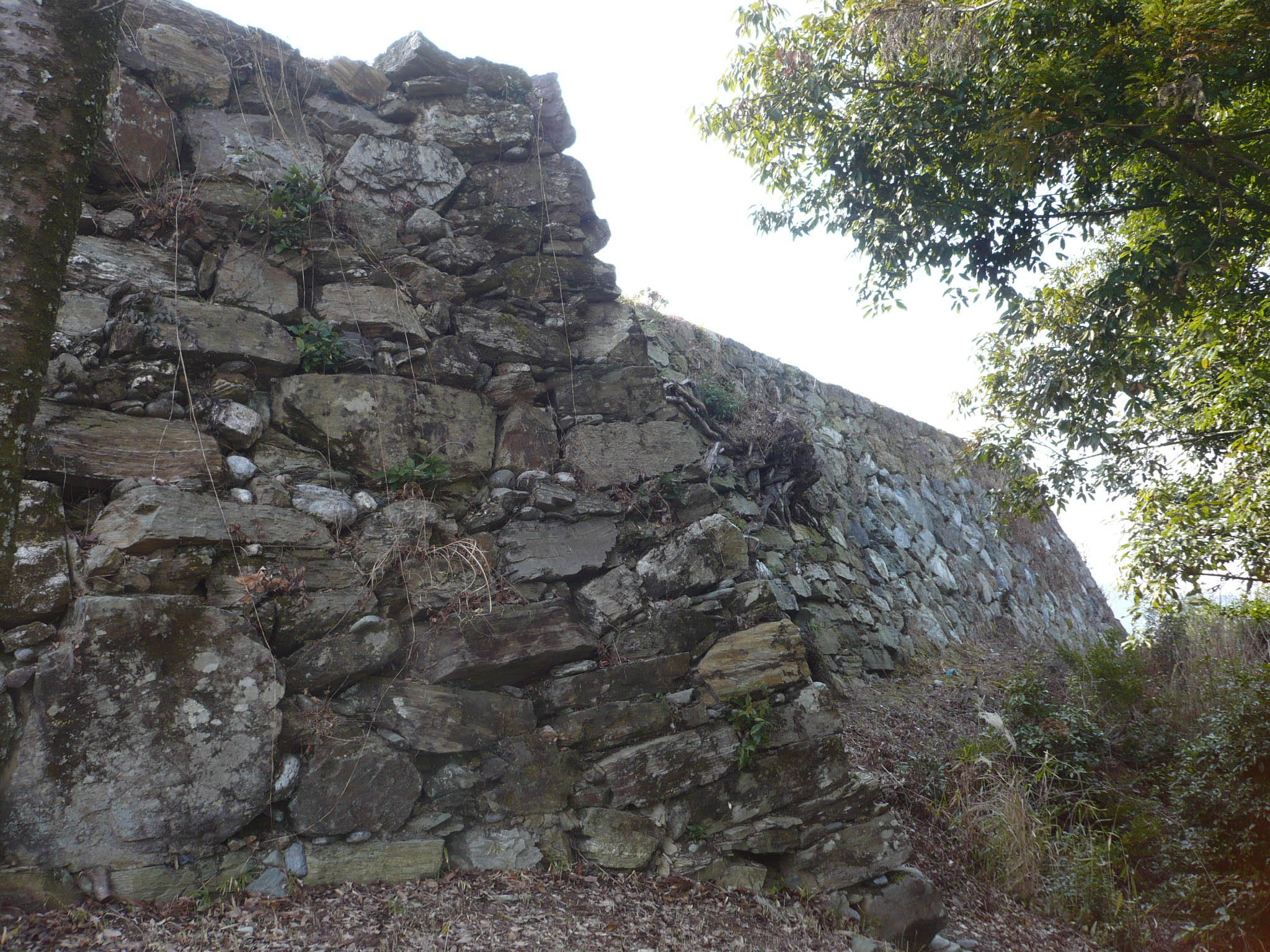
- Stone wall of Honmaru Base

Site information
- Type: Mountaintop castle
- Owner: Ogasawara clan, Ichinomiya clan, Chōsokabe clan
- Condition: ruins

Location

Site history
- Built: 1338
- Built by: Ogasawara clan
- Materials: Stone walls
- Demolished: 1638

Ichinomiya Castle is a mountaintop castle in Tokushima, Japan.

== History ==
Built in 1338, the castle was built on a strategically important site, with a river in front and on a mountain, both features giving it some protection as natural defenses. It was originally built by the Osagawara clan, which was appointed to govern Awa domain. In the conflict between Emperor Godaigo and Ashikaga Takauji, the founder of the Muromachi shogunate, the Osagawara supported the Emperor. With his defeat, the Ogasawara lost the castle, which was then given to the Ichinomiya clan

From the 14th to the 16th centuries, generations of the Ichinomiya family ruled the castle. Hachisuka Iemasa was made lord of the castle after that. The castle was dismantled in 1615. It was a hilltop castle, and it was built on the same site that Ichinomiya Castle originally was sited. In a conflict between Motochika Chosokabe and the Miyoshi, even though the Ichinomiya supported him, Motochika mistrusted the clan and removed the castle from their control, directly controlling it himself. The castle was finally demolished under the policy of Ikkoku Ichijyo Rei, or "one domein one castle rule" of 1615.

=== Shikoku campaign ===
In 1585, Toyotomi Hideyoshi started a campaign against Chosokabe Motochika and his clan. Hideyoshi marched with 100,000 soldiers against Motochika, who had 40,000. Toyotomi Hidenaga, the younger brother, led 40,000 soldiers to lay siege to the castle. After initially attacking it, they then moved to destroy the water source for the castle. Considering they were outnumbered, and had no water supply, the castle surrendered to Toyotomi. With the surrender of the castle, Chosokabe Motochika himself surrendered. The battle around the castle was the central part of the campaign.

== Current site ==
Presently, most of the remains of the castle that still stand currently are some bailey walls, and stairs. The site is signposted and accessible for tourists.

The Castle was listed as one of the Continued Top 100 Japanese Castles in 2017.

== Literature ==
- De Lange, William (2021). An Encyclopedia of Japanese Castles. Groningen: Toyo Press. pp. 600 pages. ISBN 978-9492722300.
