= Theoleptus I of Constantinople =

Ecumenical Patriarch of Constantinople from 1513 to 1522

- Ecumenical Patriarch of Constantinople
- Church: Church of Constantinople
- Installed: Mid-1513 – December 1522
- Predecessor: Pachomius I of Constantinople
- Successor: Jeremias I of Constantinople
- Previous post: Metropolitan of Ioannina

Personal details
- Born: Joseph Galesiotes
- Died: December 1522
- Denomination: Eastern Orthodoxy

Theoleptus I of Constantinople (Greek: Θεόληπτος; died December 1522) was Ecumenical Patriarch of Constantinople from 1513 to 1522.

== Life ==
Theoleptus was native of Crete or Epirus and lived as monk beside Pachomius I of Constantinople, who appointed him Metropolis of Ioannina. When Pachomius I died due to poisoning, Theoleptus moved immediately to Adrianople where he found favour with Sultan Selim I. After the payment of the usual fee for any patriarchal appointment, the Sultan appointed him as Patriarch of Constantinople. Afterwards Theoleptus I went to Constantinople for the formal election and enthronement in mid-1513.

In September 1520 his patron, Sultan Selim I, died, and so Theoleptus I's position was weakened. The first rumors began to arise, which later led to formal charges of leading an immoral private life. The Holy Synod decided that he should stand for trial, but he died, in December 1522, before the judgment.

== Patriarchate ==
The power of the Patriarch of Constantinople increased with the Ottoman–Mamluk War (1516–1517) and the consequent annexation of Syria, Palestine and Egypt by Sultan Selim I, as the Patriarchates of Alexandria, Antioch and Jerusalem were incorporated to Ottoman Empire. These patriarchates retained their religious autonomy but were de facto subjected to the influence of the Patriarch of Constantinople, who was near the Sultan and was his deputy as civil ruler of all Eastern Orthodox Christians in the Empire in accordance with the millet system. This influence of Constantinople increased during the next centuries, especially with regard to appointments. With the conquest of Palestine and the fall of Jerusalem in 1517 to Selim I, Theoleptus I obtained from the Sultan the right to maintain the Church of the Holy Sepulchre.

Theoleptus I established good relations since 1516 with Grand Prince Vasili III of Russia, whose mother was a niece of the last Byzantine emperor, Constantine XI Palaiologos. The Grand Principality of Moscow became in that age the most powerful independent Orthodox kingdom. In 1518, Theoleptus I sent the scholar Maximus the Greek to Russia.

In about 1520, Sultan Selim I, who desired a forced conversion of all Christians to Islam, ordered a take-over of the Christian churches because there was no firman to protect them. Theoleptus I, thanks to his good relations with the Sultan, and thanks to a lawyer named Xenakis, was successful in opposing the order, persuading the Sultan that the churches of Constantinople surrendered during the 1453 fall of Constantinople, being thus spared and retained for Christian worship. Even though no firman could be exhibited due to a fire at the Patriarchate, three old Janissaries, who lived during the 1453 events, swore to that effect on the Koran and were believed.

As Patriarch, Theoleptus I re-shaped the ecclesiastic organisation of the dioceses of Adrianople, Samos and into Wallachia.

== Notes and references ==
Eastern Orthodox Church titles
Preceded by Pachomius I (2)	Ecumenical Patriarch of Constantinople; 1513 – 1522	Succeeded by Jeremias I
