= Joannicius I of Constantinople =

Ecumenical Patriarch of Constantinople from 1524 to 1525

- Ecumenical Patriarch of Constantinople
- Church: Church of Constantinople
- In office: April / May 1524 – 24 September 1525
- Predecessor: Jeremias I of Constantinople
- Successor: Jeremias I of Constantinople

Personal details
- Died: c. 1526 Thrace
- Denomination: Eastern Orthodoxy

Joannicius I of Constantinople (Greek: Ἰωαννίκιος; died c. 1526) was Ecumenical Patriarch of Constantinople briefly in 1524–1525. He is sometimes considered an intruder.

== Life ==
Patriarch Jeremias I of Constantinople, shortly after his election, travelled to Cyprus, Egypt, Sinai and Palestine. While he stayed in Jerusalem, the clergy and the notables of Constantinople, annoyed by his long absence, deposed him on April or May 1524, and elected in his place the Metropolitan of Sozopolis in Thrace, Patriarch Joannicius I.

Jeremias I reacted and together with the Patriarchs of Alexandria and Antioch, whom he called to Jerusalem, he excommunicated Joannicius I. Even if the majority of the Holy Synod sided with Joannicius I, the Sultan Suleiman the Magnificent ordered Jeremias I to be re-installed on the throne, which took place in Constantinople on 24 September 1525. Joannicius I returned to Thrace, where he died in the monastery of Saint John the Baptist near Sozopolis circa 1526.

== Notes and references ==
Eastern Orthodox Church titles
| Preceded by Jeremias I | Ecumenical Patriarch of Constantinople; 1524 – 1525 | Succeeded by Jeremias I (2) |
