= Jeremias I of Constantinople =

Ecumenical Patriarch of Constantinople from 1522 to 1524 and from 1525 to 1546

Saint Jeremias I of Constantinople
- Ecumenical Patriarch of Constantinople
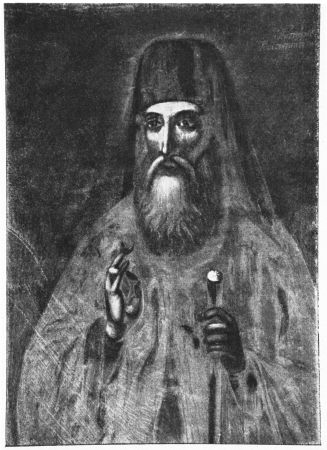
- Patriarch Jeremias I of Constantinople as depicted in 1907
- Native name: Ιερεμίας Α΄
- Church: Church of Constantinople
- In office: 31 December 1522 – April / May 1524; 24 September 1525 – 13 January 1546
- Predecessor: Theoleptus I of Constantinople; Joannicius I of Constantinople
- Successor: Joannicius I of Constantinople; Dionysius II of Constantinople
- Previous post: Archbishop of Sofia

Personal details
- Born: 1485 Zitsa in Epirus
- Died: 13 January 1546 (aged 60–61) Vratsa, Bulgaria
- Denomination: Ecumenical Patriarchate of Constantinople

Sainthood
- Feast day: 13 January
- Venerated in: Eastern Orthodox Church
- Title as Saint: Patriarch, Holy Hierarch
- Canonized: 10 January 2023; Istanbul, Turkey by Ecumenical Patriarchate of Constantinople

Jeremias I of Constantinople (Greek: Ἰερεμίας; died 13 January 1546) was Ecumenical Patriarch of Constantinople two times, from 1522 to 1524 and from 1525 to 1546.

== Life ==
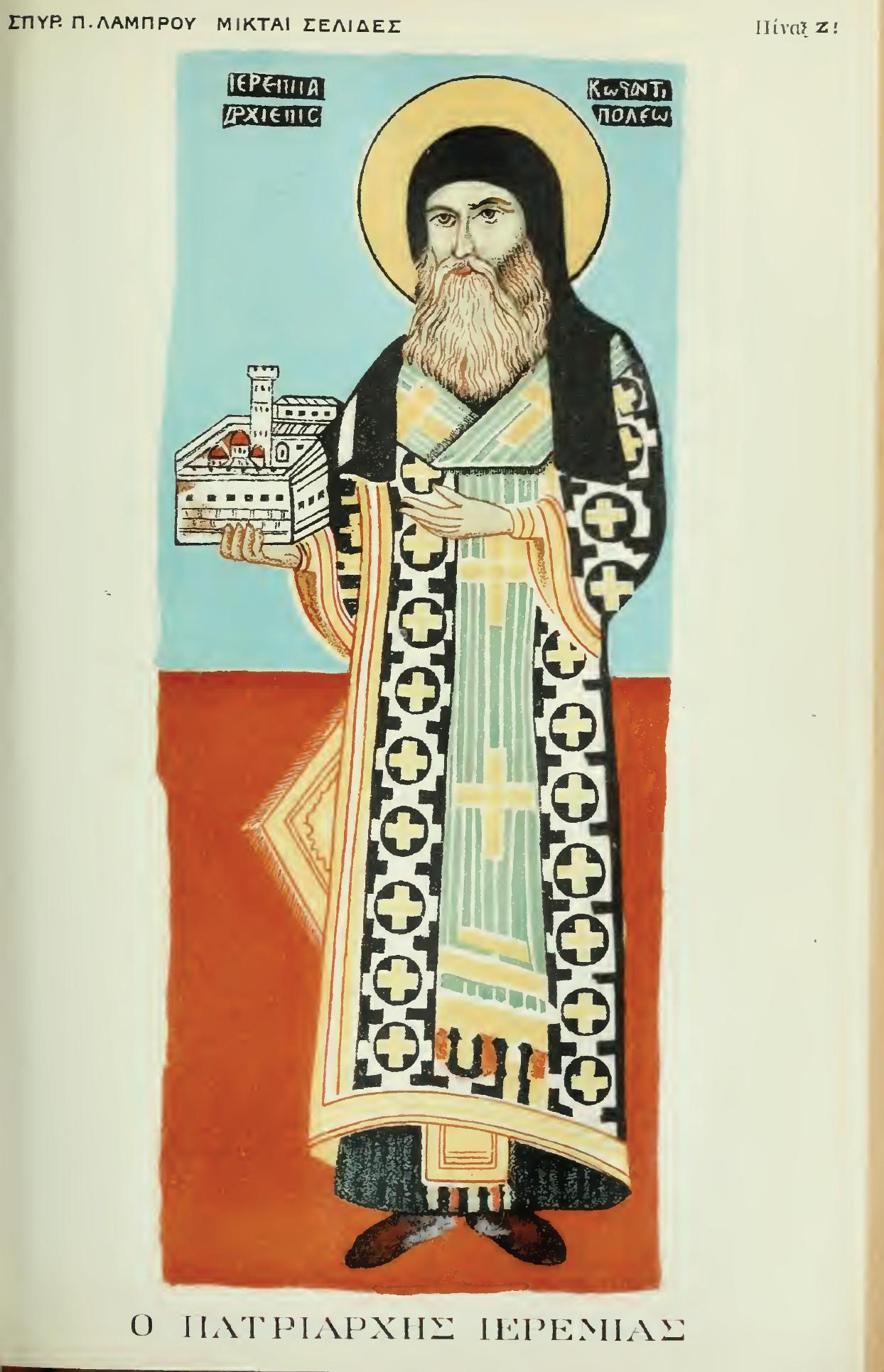
Jeremias I of Constantinople as depicted in the 16th century

Jeremias was a native of Zitsa in Epirus, and was raised without instruction. He was born in 1485. He became Archbishop of Sofia on or before 1513. On 31 December 1522 he became Patriarch of Constantinople.

Shortly after his election, he travelled to Cyprus, Egypt, Sinai and Palestine. During his stay in Jerusalem, the clergy and the notables of Constantinople deposed him on April or May 1524, and elected in his place the Metropolitan of Sozopolis, Joannicius I of Constantinople. Jeremias reacted and together with the Patriarchs of Alexandria and Antioch whom he called to Jerusalem, he excommunicated Joannicius I. He was restored in Constantinople on 24 September 1525.

In 1537 Jeremias obtained an order from the Sultan Suleiman the Magnificent to stop the conversion of churches into mosques in Constantinople, but this decision was not confirmed by Suleiman's successors. Jeremias I died on 13 January 1546 in the town of Vratsa, while travelling to Wallachia.

On 10 January 2023 (N.S.), the Holy and Sacred Synod of the Ecumenical Patriarchate of Constantinople, under the presidency of His All-Holiness Ecumenical Patriarch Bartholomew, formally added Patriarch Jeremias I to the calendar of Saints of the Orthodox Church, with an annual commemoration of 13 January.

== Notes and references ==
Eastern Orthodox Church titles
Preceded by Theoleptus I	Ecumenical Patriarch of Constantinople; 1522 – 1524	Succeeded by Joannicius I
Preceded by Joannicius I	Ecumenical Patriarch of Constantinople; 1525 – 1546	Succeeded by Dionysius II
