= List of settlements in the Chios regional unit =

Regional unit settlements

This is a list of settlements in Chios regional unit in Greece:

- Agio Gala
- Agios Georgios Sykousis
- Amades
- Anavatos
- Armolia
- Avgonyma
- Chalandra
- Chalkeio
- Chios (town)
- Dafnonas
- Diefcha
- Elata
- Exo Didyma
- Flatsia
- Fyta
- Kalamoti
- Kallimasia
- Kampia
- Kardamyla
- Karfas
- Karyes
- Katarraktis
- Keramos
- Koini
- Kourounia
- Lagkada
- Leptopoda
- Lithi
- Melanios
- Mesa Didyma
- Mesta
- Myrmigki
- Nea Potamia
- Nenita
- Nenitouria
- Neochori
- Oinousses
- Olympoi
- Pagida
- Parparia
- Patrika
- Pirama
- Pispilounta
- Pityous
- Psara
- Pyrgi
- Sidirounta
- Spartounta
- Sykiada
- Tholopotami
- Thymiana
- Trypes
- Vasileonoiko
- Vaviloi
- Ververato
- Vessa
- Viki
- Volissos
- Vouno
- Vrontados
- Zyfias

== See also ==
- List of towns and villages in Greece
