= Avgonyma =

Avgonima Αυγώνυμα
- Village
- Interactive map of Avgonima
- Coordinates: 38.377°N 26.021°E
- Country: Greece
- Region: North Aegean
- Regional unit: Chios
- Municipality: Chios
- Municipal unit: Omiroupoli
- Elevation: 475 m (1,558 ft)

Population (2011)
  - Total: 14
- Time zone: UTC+2 (EET)
  - Summer (DST): UTC+3 (EEST)
- Postal code: 821 00

Avgonima (Greek: Αυγώνυμα, also transliterated Avgonyma) is a small mountain village in the central-western part of the island of Chios, in the North Aegean region of Greece. It lies roughly 15 km (9.3 mi) west of Chios town, close to the Nea Moni monastery a few kilometres to the east and the abandoned medieval village of Anavatos a short distance to the north, with a territory extending westward to the bay of Elinda (the ancient Elaious). Like the neighbouring Anavatos, it is a fortified-type medieval settlement of close-set stone houses, and one of the better-preserved examples of this village type on Chios. At the 2011 census it had a permanent population of 14.

== Name ==
The etymology of the name is uncertain. One derivation connects Avgonima with Evonyma (Εὐώνυμα) and the plant euonymus, comparing the related place-names Evgonymos on Skyros and Evonymos on Tinos and the ancient Attic deme of Euonymon. An alternative explanation derives the name from evonita (εὐώνητα, "cheaply bought, inexpensive estates"), based on the nearby field-name Avgonymata, a locality between Avgonima and Anavatos; this reading has in turn been disputed, on the grounds that Avgonymata is simply a dialectal plural of Avgonyma rather than evidence for a separate root. It is generally agreed that the name does not derive from the Greek word for "egg" (avgo), and that it is therefore spelled with -αυ-.

The inhabitants are called Avgonymousoi (Αυγωνυμούσοι) in the local dialect. The people of Pityous are said to have called them Merousoi, a term properly applied to woodcutters or sawyers; the nickname belonged chiefly to the people of neighbouring Anavatos, who were known for sawing timber.

== Geography ==
Avgonima stands on a rocky hill at an altitude of about 475 metres, surrounded by the pine forest of Mount Provatas, with views westward over the Aegean Sea toward the island of Psara. The village is divided into a lower and an upper settlement, Kato Avgonima and Epano Avgonima. Its lands reach the western coast at the inlet of Elinda, and an old footpath known as the Petsodos historically linked it, by way of Nea Moni, Dafnonas, Provatas and Anavatos, to the town of Chios.

== History ==
=== Origins ===
Avgonima and Anavatos are considered to be among the island's oldest villages, possibly of pre-medieval origin. Local tradition holds that the village was founded in the 11th century by the workers who built the nearby monastery of Nea Moni and afterwards settled in the surrounding hills; this account is widely repeated but is recorded as tradition rather than as documented history.

=== Genoese and Ottoman periods ===
Early descriptions of the villages of Chios refer to Avgonima as a fortified stronghold, and as a casale. Tradition holds that the village, like Anavatos, was at some point destroyed by pirates, which is generally given as the reason for the defensive, tightly clustered form of its houses. Avgonima lay on the western margin of the island's mastic-producing zone; the three western villages of Sykousis, Lithi and Avgonima are recorded as having somewhat neglected mastic cultivation despite a subsidy intended to support it.

=== 1822 massacre and decline ===
During the Chios massacre of 1822, the western and central villages of the island suffered heavily, and Avgonima, together with Anavatos, was among the settlements affected. Avgonima is listed among the Chian villages whose populations were irreparably reduced in the aftermath of the catastrophe, alongside Kardamyla, Koila, Langada, Mesta, Kalamoti and Nenita. Where the fortified village of Anavatos was effectively reduced to a ruin, Avgonima survived but entered a long decline, and was almost entirely abandoned by the 1960s.

=== Modern era ===
Having nearly emptied in the 1960s, the village was spared large-scale modern rebuilding, and much of it has since been restored in keeping with its traditional architecture. Its few permanent residents are engaged mainly in agriculture and beekeeping, while restored stone houses, tavernas and the surrounding landscape support a modest tourism in the area.

== Layout and architecture ==
The settlement is built of close-set, cube-shaped stone houses with small windows, a form associated with defence against pirate raids. Beyond the division into Kato and Epano Avgonima, several neighbourhoods (synoikies) are recorded: Pyrgos, Palaiopyrgos, Exoporta, Chorostasi, tou Poulia, and Vlavaïka (Vlavadika) to the east — the last named from the Byzantine family of Glavas (Gravas, Gavras). A medieval tower (pyrgos) stands on the village square opposite the church of Saint George; it later served as a public building. Numerous local field- and place-names belonging to Avgonima are also on record.

== Churches ==
The principal churches of the village are those of the Panagia (Virgin Mary) and Saint George. Others associated with the village and its lands include Saint Isidore (at the locality Avgonymata, formerly belonging to the Pachnoi family according to an 1882 metropolitan register), a further church of Saint Isidore toward the Aipos ridge, and Saint George Alountos.

== Demographics ==
A tabulation of village populations from the early 1920s gives Avgonima a figure of about 500, considerably larger than the roughly 100 recorded for the neighbouring (and by then largely ruined) Anavatos. The village declined steeply over the 20th century, and by the 2011 census its permanent population had fallen to 14. Census figures for the village are held to understate the number of people connected with it, since many who spend time there are registered or counted elsewhere.

Population
Year	Pop.	±%
14		—
Sources: a village tabulation of the early 1920s; Hellenic Statistical Authority (2011).

== See also ==
- Anavatos
- Nea Moni of Chios
- Chios
- Chios massacre
