= Pirama, Chios =

Pirama Πιραμά
- Community
- Location within Greece
- Coordinates: 38°30′N 25°54′E
- Country: Greece
- Administrative region: North Aegean
- Regional unit: Chios
- Municipality: Chios
- Municipal unit: Amani

Population (2021)
  - Community: 29
- Time zone: UTC+2 (EET)
  - Summer (DST): UTC+3 (EEST)
- Postal code: 821 03
- Area code: 22740
- Vehicle registration: ΧΙ
- Website: www.pirama.org

Pirama is a village on the island of Chios, Greece. It is the only settlement of the eponymous community, part of the municipal unit Amani. Pirama is 4 kilometers from the village Volissos and 44 from Chios Town. It is built on the flat top of a hill and elevation 220m. At the 2021 census it had 29 inhabitants.

The sights of the village include a Venetian tower in the square of the village. Pirama also has a cultural club, located in the village school.

Village's main church is the St. John the Baptist and still has many chapels. The festival of the village celebrated on August 29, celebration day ablation of the Honest Head of John the Baptist, when central church celebrates.

== See also ==
- List of settlements in the Chios regional unit
