= Saint Markella Monastery =

Monastery in Chios Municipality, Greece

Coordinates: 38.4800°N 25.8868°E

The Monastery of Saint Markella (Greek: Ιερό Προσκύνημα Αγίας Μαρκέλλας Χίου) is a Greek Orthodox female monastery on the island of Chios, near the village of Volissos, birthplace of the saint.
