= Chios Strait =

Strait in the eastern Aegean Sea

Coordinates: 38°20′00″N 26°12′00″E

The Chios Strait, (Turkish: Sakız Boğazı) or the Chios Channel as referred to by some sources, is a relatively narrow strait in the eastern Aegean Sea that separates the Greek island of Chios from the Anatolian mainland and from the Aegean Region of Turkey.

== Geography ==
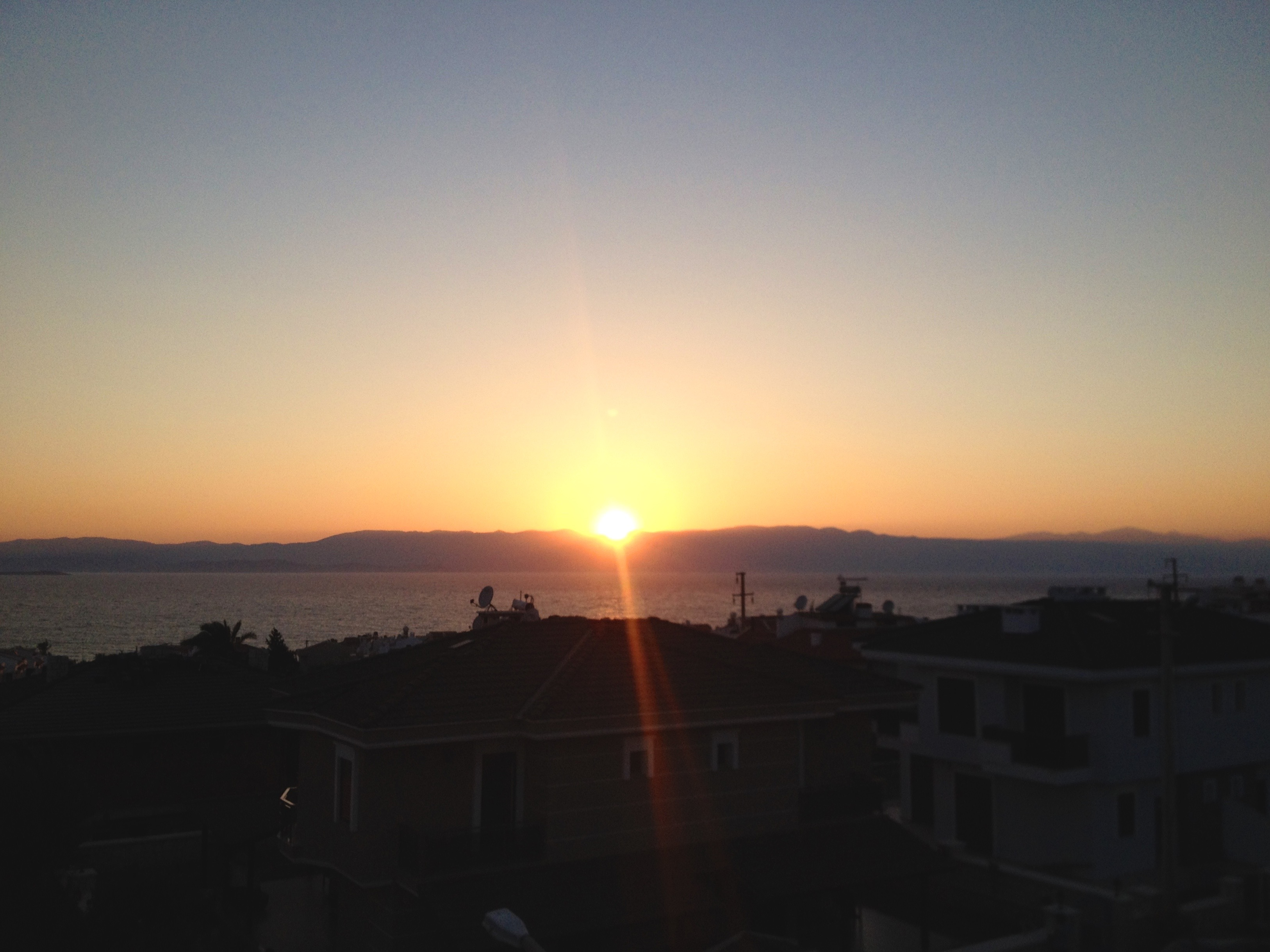
Sunset over the mountains of Chios as viewed from Çeşme

The Chios Strait is approximately 3 nautical miles in width, and it is the body of water that separates Chios from the isthmuses along the western extremity of the Urla-Karaburun-Çeşme Peninsula in Turkey. The peninsula hosts many major districts and cities in İzmir Province, including the municipality of Çeşme, the westernmost city along the peninsula and, therefore, the closest to Chios. Çeşme is one of the northern cities of the Turkish Riviera, and almost its entire coastline is situated along the waters of the strait. In many situations, such as in the photograph to the right, the mountains of Chios and the Chios Strait can easily be viewed from Turkey, and vice versa along the east coast of Chios from settlements such as Karfas. The hospitable water conditions of the Chios Strait make it a very common tourism and boating destination on both the Greek and Turkish coasts.

== See also ==
- Aegean Sea
- Çeşme
- Chios
- Gulf of İzmir
- Karaburun Peninsula
- Karfas
