= Vrbovce, Slovakia =

Vrbovce
- Municipality
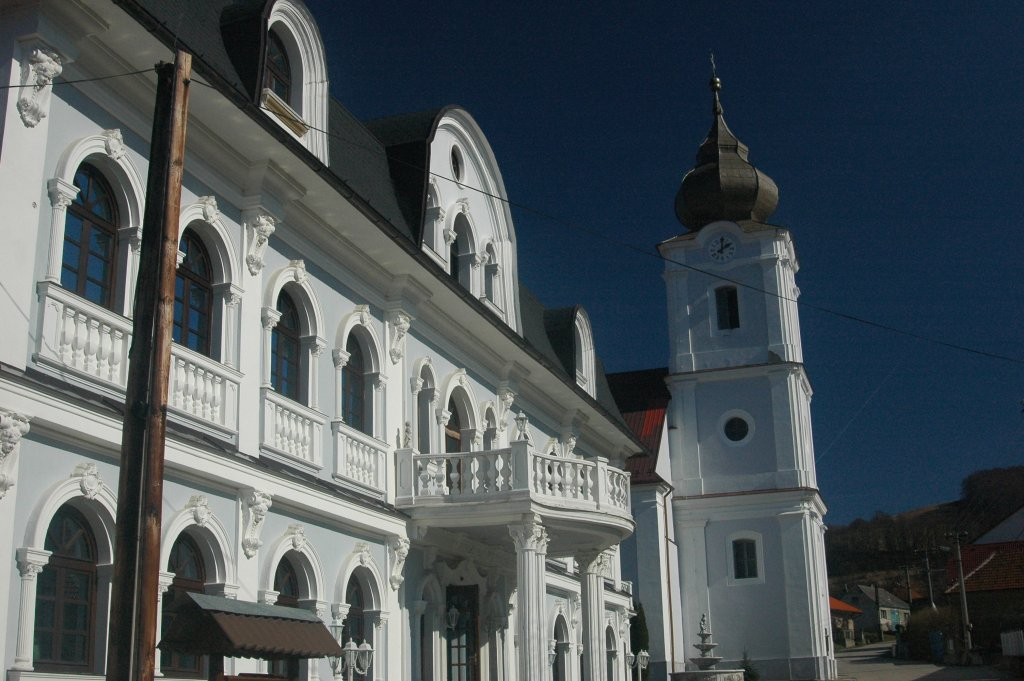
- Lutheran church

- Flag

- Location of Vrbovce in the Trenčín Region Location of Vrbovce in Slovakia
- Coordinates: 48°48′N 17°28′E
- Country: Slovakia
- Region: Trenčín Region
- District: Myjava District
- First mentioned: 1394

Area
  - Total: 51.03 km^{2} (19.70 sq mi)
- Elevation: 341 m (1,119 ft)

Population (2025)
  - Total: 1,401
- Time zone: UTC+1 (CET)
  - Summer (DST): UTC+2 (CEST)
- Postal code: 906 06
- Area code: +421 34
- Vehicle registration plate (until 2022): MY
- Website: www.vrbovce.sk

Vrbovce (Hungarian: Verbóc or Verbósz) is a village stretching out in the protected landscape area of the White Carpathians in Myjava District in the Trenčín Region of north-western Slovakia, on the border with the Czech Republic.

== History ==
Vrbovce was mentioned in historical documents for the first time in 1394 when it belonged to the Branč castle. Since 1569 its owner was transferred gradually to the Amades, Hédervárys, Nyárys, Zichys families and others. The village was also granted town privileges which were destroyed in a fire in 1757. In 1810 the Vrbovce villagers were granted the right to hold markets. Before the establishment of independent Czechoslovakia in 1918, Vrbovce was part of Nyitra County within the Kingdom of Hungary. From 1939 to 1945, it was part of the Slovak Republic.

== Geography ==
The municipality lies at an altitude of 341 metres (1,119 ft) and covers an area of 51.03 km^{2} (19.70 sq mi) (2025). From the northern side the village cadastre is bounded with the state border and the border crossing with the Czech Republic.

== Population ==
Population statistic (10 years)
Year	1995	2005	2015	2025
Count	1625	1577	1517	1401
Difference		−2.95%	−3.80%	−7.64%

Population statistic
Year	2024	2025
Count	1405	1401
Difference		−0.28%

It has a population of 1401 people (31 December 2025).

=== Ethnicity ===
Census 2021 (1+ %)
Ethnicity	Number	Fraction
Slovak	1352	93.24%
Not found out	66	4.55%
Czech	48	3.31%
Total	1450	

In year 2021 was 1450 people by ethnicity 1352 as Slovak, 66 as Not found out, 48 as Czech, 5 as Other, 3 as Romani, 3 as Russian, 3 as Romanian, 2 as Ukrainian, 1 as Vietnamese, 1 as Rusyn, 1 as German, 1 as Moravian and 1 as Hungarian.

Note on population: The difference values of population numbers in the table "Population statistic" and in the sections "Ethnicity" & "Religion" is caused by the use of various statistical methods.

=== Religion ===
Census 2021 (1+ %)
Religion	Number	Fraction
Evangelical Church	978	67.45%
None	242	16.69%
Roman Catholic Church	113	7.79%
Not found out	80	5.52%
Total	1450	

In year 2021 was 1450 people by religion 978 from Evangelical Church, 242 from None, 113 from Roman Catholic Church, 80 from Not found out, 8 from Jehovah's Witnesses, 5 from Eastern Orthodox Church, 5 from Greek Catholic Church, 5 from Ad hoc movements, 4 from Other, 3 from Buddhism, 2 from Paganism and natural spirituality, 2 from Christian Congregations in Slovakia, 1 from Old Catholic Church, 1 from Other and not ascertained christian church and 1 from United Methodist Church.

The people of Vrbovce mainly went in for agriculture, stock breeding, small trades and handicrafts (sack-making, basket-making, wood-making). The number of people: 1787 – 4493, 1900 – 3686, 2001 – 1620.

== Tourism ==
A large square dominates the village where a Roman Catholic church is situated from 1590. In the last few years the village has become known to its surroundings by setting up a so-called Vrbovčanská Room. The room is said to have the spirit of an old Slovak ground floor house adorned with rich furnishings. In the last years the tradition of organizing traditional St. Lucas markets (Saturday – market, Sunday – village fete) has been restored in the village, The environments of the village are excellent conditions for skiing, hiking and cycling. You can start or finish a known cycle path Vrbovce – Chvojnica – Havran – Častkov – Sobotište, Enthusiasts of technical monuments can visit water mill. The village also offers boars and lodgings facilities.

== Gallery ==
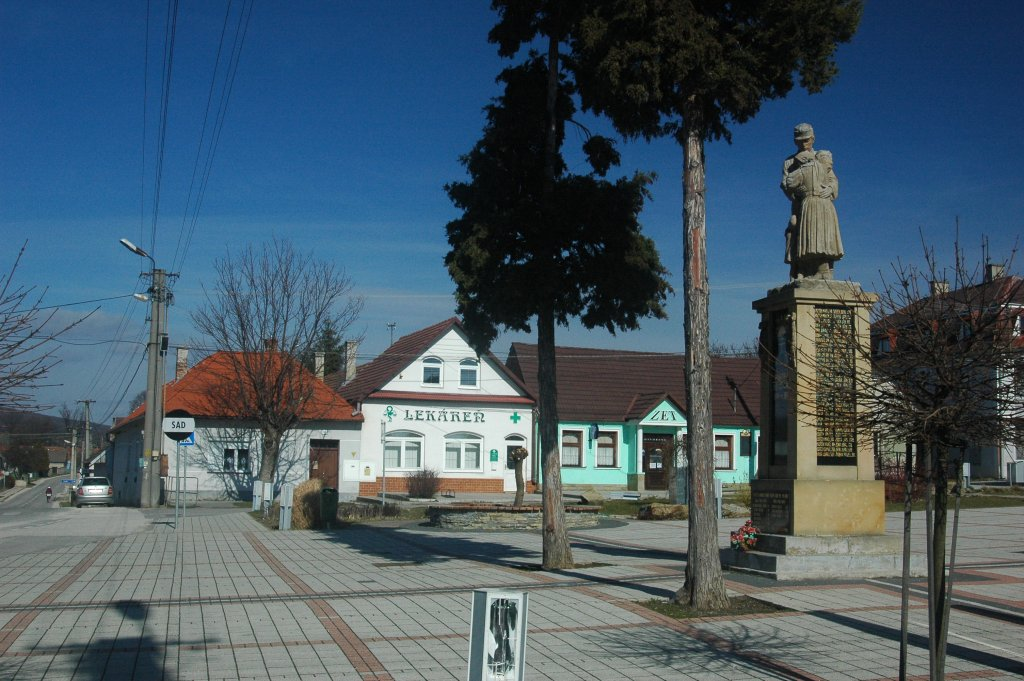

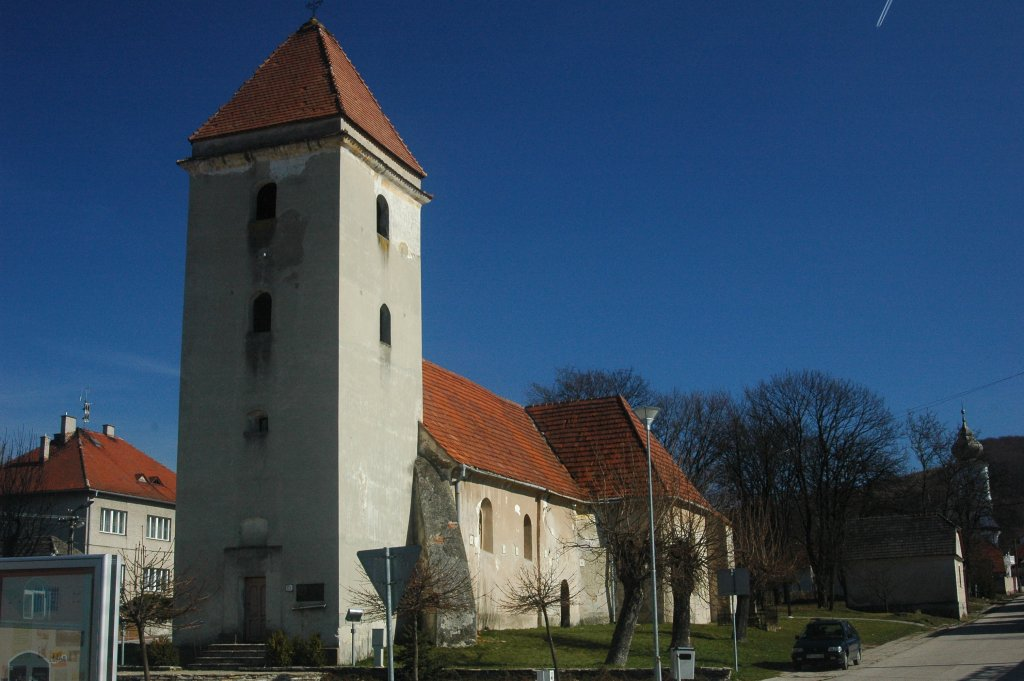

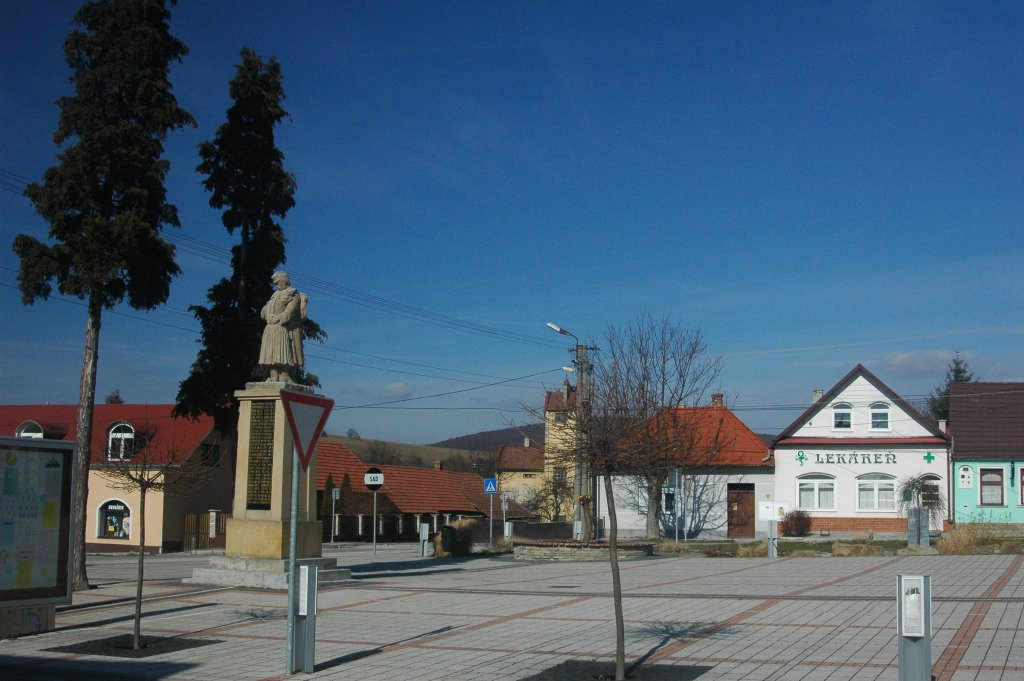

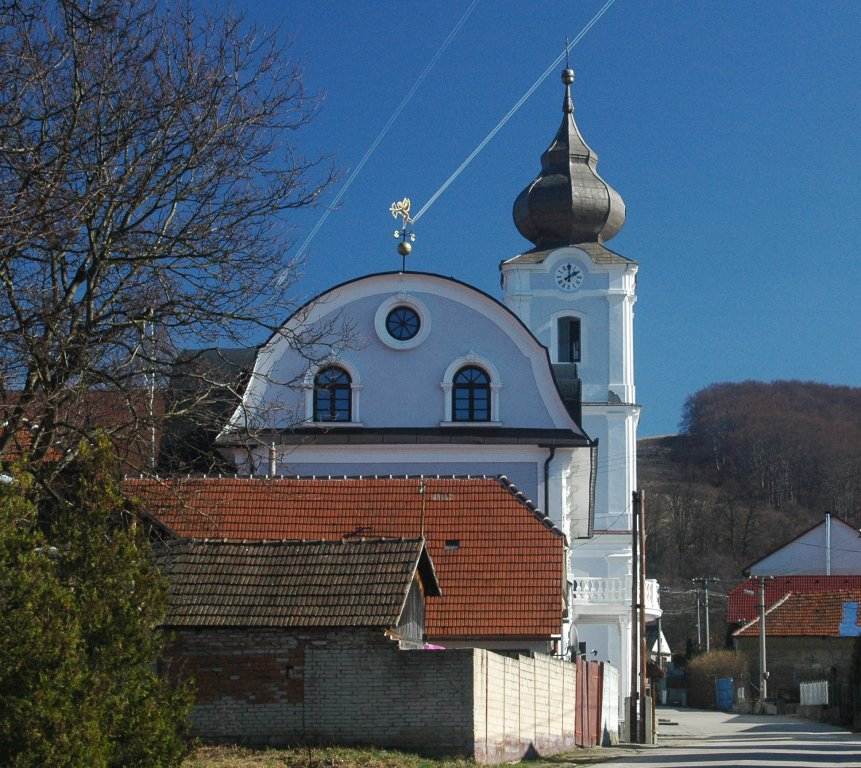

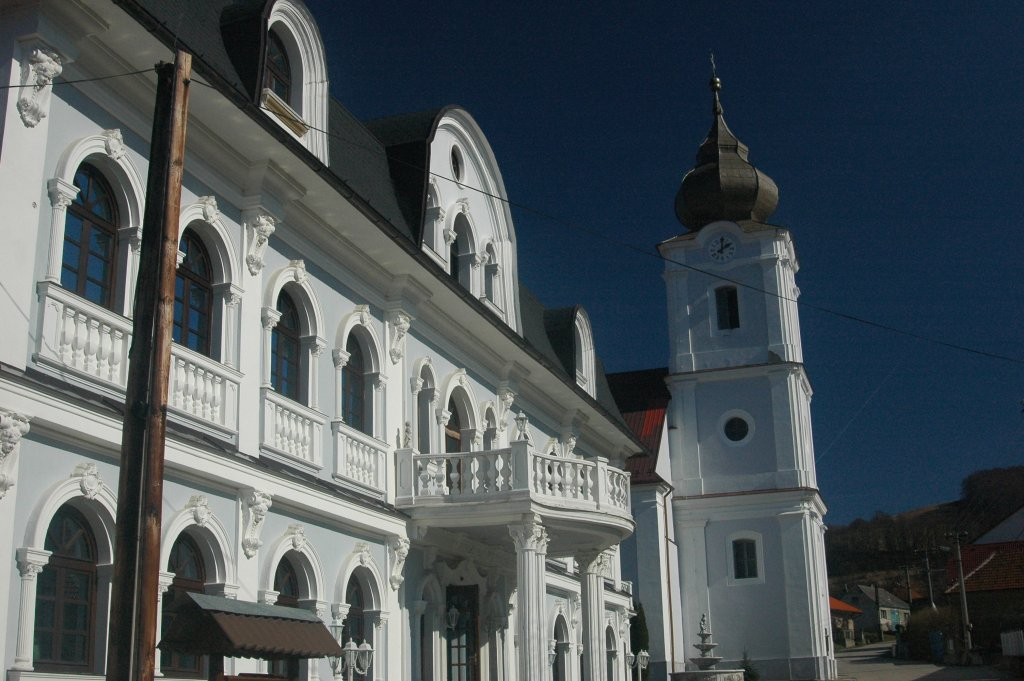

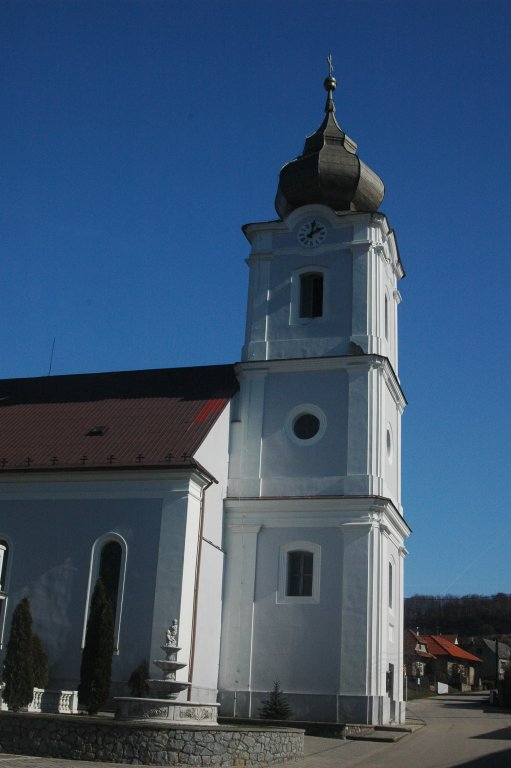

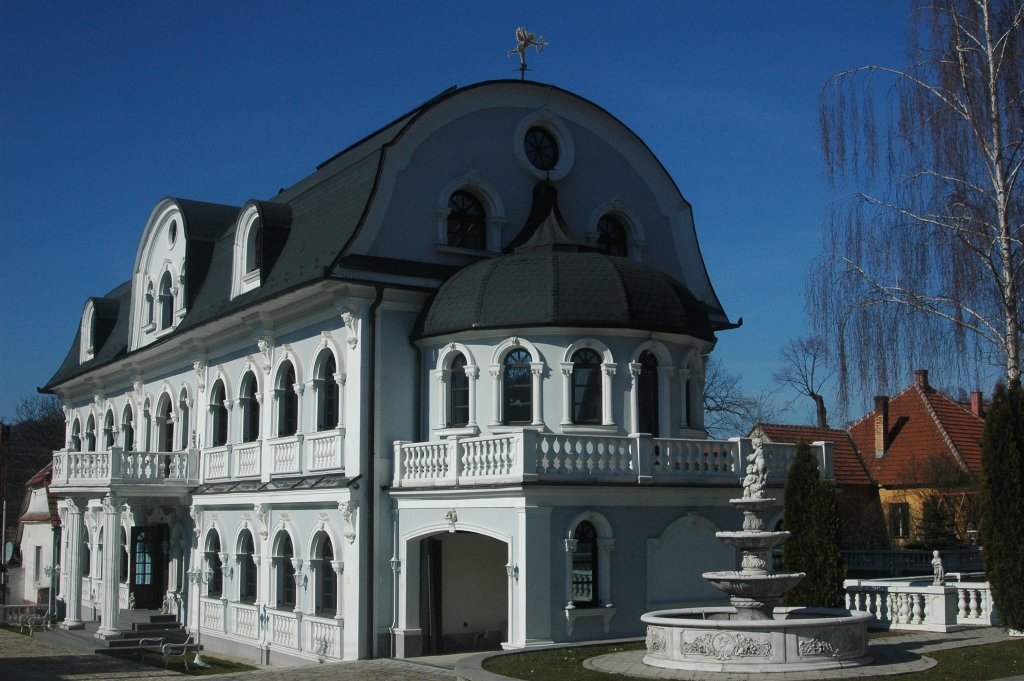

== See also ==
- Vrbové
