= Pirama =

Pirama may refer to:

- Pirama, Chios, a village in Greece
- Pirama (Sicily), an archaeological site in Italy
