= Cybeleia =

Ancient Ionian city

Coordinates: 38°36′38″N 26°21′29″E

Cybeleia or Kybeleia (Ancient Greek: Κυβέλεια) or Cybellia was a city of ancient Ionia. Strabo, after saying that the mountain Mimas is between Erythrae and the Hypocremnus, adds, "then a village Cybellia, and the promontory Melaena." This is all that is known.

Its site is tentatively located near the modern Badembükü.
