= Neochori, Chios =

Neochori Νεοχώρι
- Community
- Location within Greece
- Coordinates: 38°18′29″N 26°06′50″E
- Country: Greece
- Administrative region: North Aegean
- Regional unit: Chios
- Municipality: Chios
- Municipal unit: Agios Minas

Population (2021)
  - Community: 701
- Time zone: UTC+2 (EET)
  - Summer (DST): UTC+3 (EEST)

Neochori (Greek: Νεοχώρι) is a village on the island of Chios, Greece. It is part of the municipality Agios Minas, and located approximately 9 kilometers from the capital of the island, Chios (town), also known locally as Chora. There are medieval manuscripts that refer to the village but no sign of the Middle Ages was preserved. The inhabitants are mainly farmers. The main church is devoted to Virgin Mary and it is an example of the local architecture of the 19th century.

The haven of Neochori is beach of Agia Fotia. Near the beach are hotels, rooms and studios to let, taverns, and cafes. The Monastery of Agios Minas overlooks the village from the hill nearby. This monastery was built during 1572 -1595 by the Reverend Father Neofitos Koumanos and his son, Father Menas, at the time of Patriarch Jeremiah II. Initially it housed monks, but in 1932 it was converted into a nunnery. During the Turkish occupation, it maintained a school and a noteworthy library. This monastery is famous in world history for the massacre of 1822 when crowds of Chians were killed by the Turks or burned inside the chapel and in the courtyard of the monastery. Today, there is still evidence of the victims with the bloodstained stone floors of the chapel. The bones of many of the victims are kept in the Mausoleum of the 40 Martyrs in the courtyard of the monastery. There were 35 nuns in the monastery who were kept busy with hagiography, crafts and the sewing of ecclesiastical garments. Today, only 11 nuns live in the Monastery.
