= Amades =

Amades Αμάδες
- Community
- Location within Greece
- Coordinates: 38°34′N 26°02′E
- Country: Greece
- Administrative region: North Aegean
- Regional unit: Chios
- Municipality: Chios
- Municipal unit: Kardamyla

Population (2021)
  - Community: 67
- Time zone: UTC+2 (EET)
  - Summer (DST): UTC+3 (EEST)

Amades (Greek: Αμάδες) is a semi mountainous small village located in the Northeastern area of Chios island, in Greece. After the ratification of the Greek law of Kallikrates, Amades belongs to the municipal unit of Kardamyla within the municipality of Chios. According to the last census, which took place in 2011, the permanent population of Amades is 140 people.

== History ==
It is said that the very first inhabitants of the village were Pelasgians who came from Thessaly and who believed in the Pelinean Zeus, whom the mountain near the village is named after. The Pelinaio mountain, at 1,297 m (4,255 ft) is the highest mountain in Chios and one of the highest in the Aegean Sea. How this village took its name is not certain. The most common explanation is that it took its name from the ancient game amada (modern Greek: Αμάδα), where each participant had a small stone and within a specific perimeter they tried to hit the others’ stones. The contemporary game of Amada is said to be like billiards or bowling.

== Economy ==
The most common occupation for the inhabitants is farming. Most own land on which they cultivate vegetables and other crops. Additionally, the village is known for the production of olive oil.

== Architecture ==
Early houses were typically built from stone and wood. In most cases each house consisted of two, maximum three rooms. Later houses were built according to more modern standards.
