= Balıklıova =

- Neighbourhood
- Location within Turkey Location within İzmir
- Coordinates: 38.4232°N 26.5840°E
- Country: Turkey
- Province: İzmir
- District: Urla
- Established: 1563

Government
  - Muhtar: Akın Yılmaz
- Population (2022): 1,199
- Time zone: UTC+3 (TRT)
- Postal code: 35436
- Area code: 0232

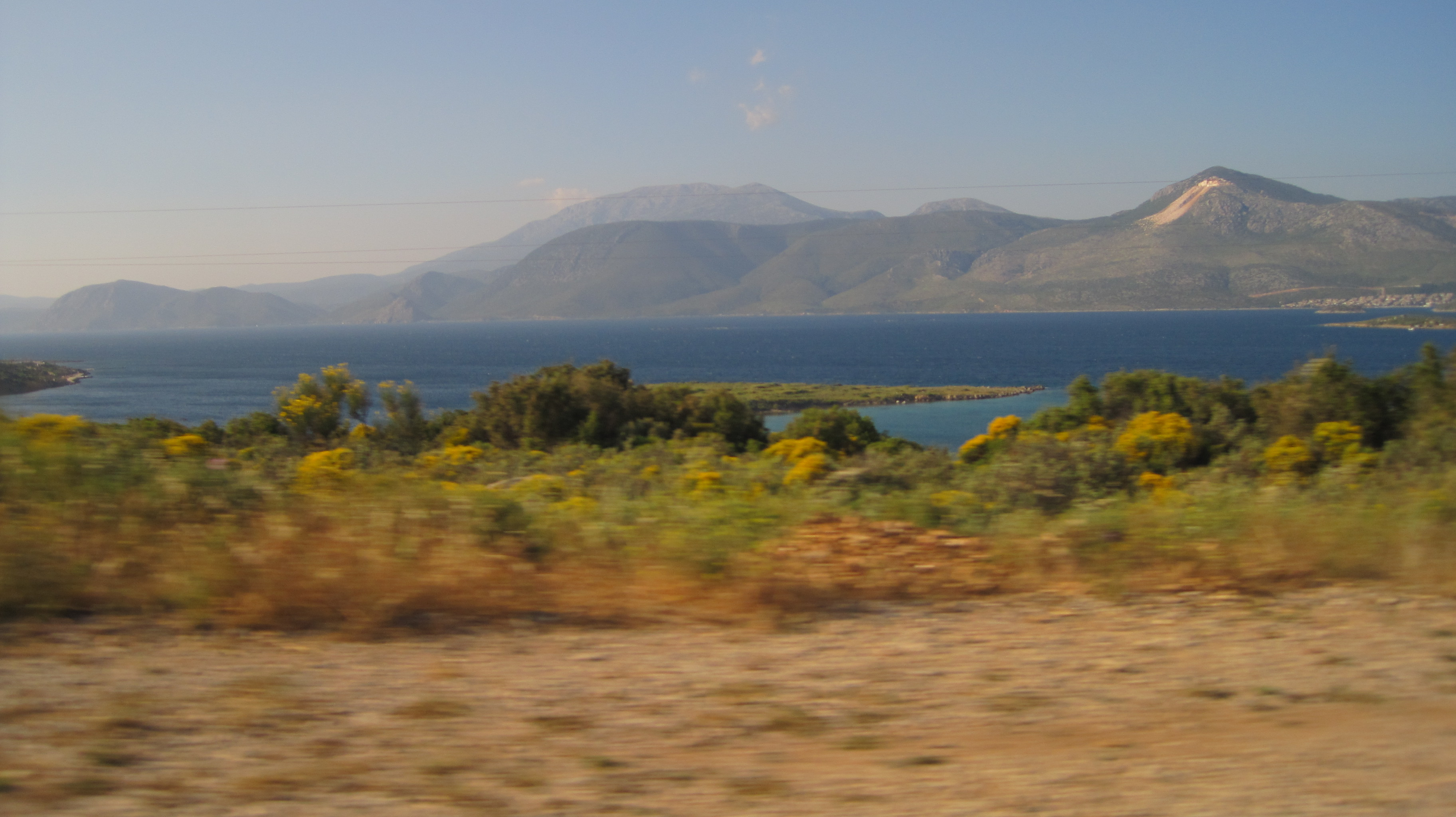
Balıklıova, Urla, İzmir, Turkey

Balıklıova (Balikliova) is a neighbourhood in the municipality and district of Urla, İzmir Province, Turkey. As of 2022, it has a population of 1,199. The majority of households are summer houses and summer sites, so during the summer season the population is higher. Balıklıova lies between Urla and Karaburun. The name Balıklıova derives from the Turkish words balık, "fish," and ova, "plain," meaning "a plain full of fish." Fishing and agriculture is of great importance in the economy of the village. Olives, narcissus, and artichokes are harvested in the area.

== See also ==
- Sheikh Bedreddin
- Karaburun Peninsula
- Flour kurabiye
