= Kampochora =

Kampochora Καμπόχωρα
- Municipal unit
- Location within the regional unit

- Location within Greece
- Coordinates: 38°20′N 26°06′E
- Country: Greece
- Administrative region: North Aegean
- Regional unit: Chios
- Municipality: Chios

Area
  - Municipal unit: 50.6 km^{2} (19.5 sq mi)

Population (2021)
  - Municipal unit: 3,014
  - Municipal unit density: 59.6/km^{2} (154/sq mi)
- Time zone: UTC+2 (EET)
  - Summer (DST): UTC+3 (EEST)
- Vehicle registration: ΧΙ

Kampochora or Kampos (Greek: Καμπόχωρα, Κάμπος), literally plain, is a region and former municipality on the island of Chios, North Aegean, Greece. Since the 2011 local government reform it is part of the municipality of Chios, of which it is a municipal unit. It is located in the south-central part of the island. It has a land area of 50.571 km². Its population was 3,014 at the 2021 census. The seat of the municipality was in Chalkeio. Other large towns include Ágios Geórgios Sykoúsis, Dafnonas, and Vasileónoikon.

The area started to develop during the Genoese rule of the island in the 13th century, when the most wealthy Chiot Greek and Genoese families started to build their houses. The area is now known for its 19th century mansions, high walls and citrus groves of oranges and mandarins.

== Gallery ==
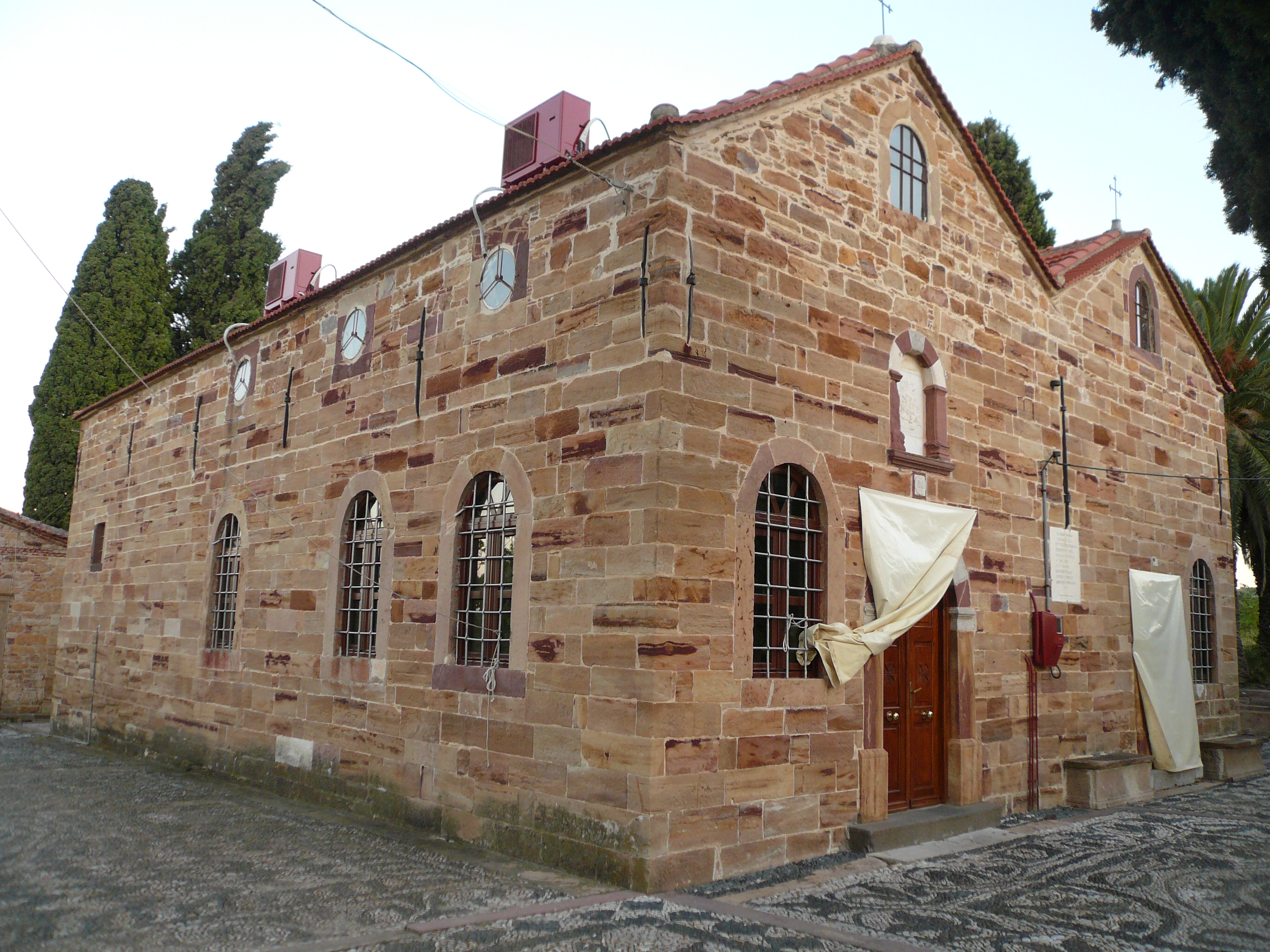
Byzantine church Panagia Kokorovilia

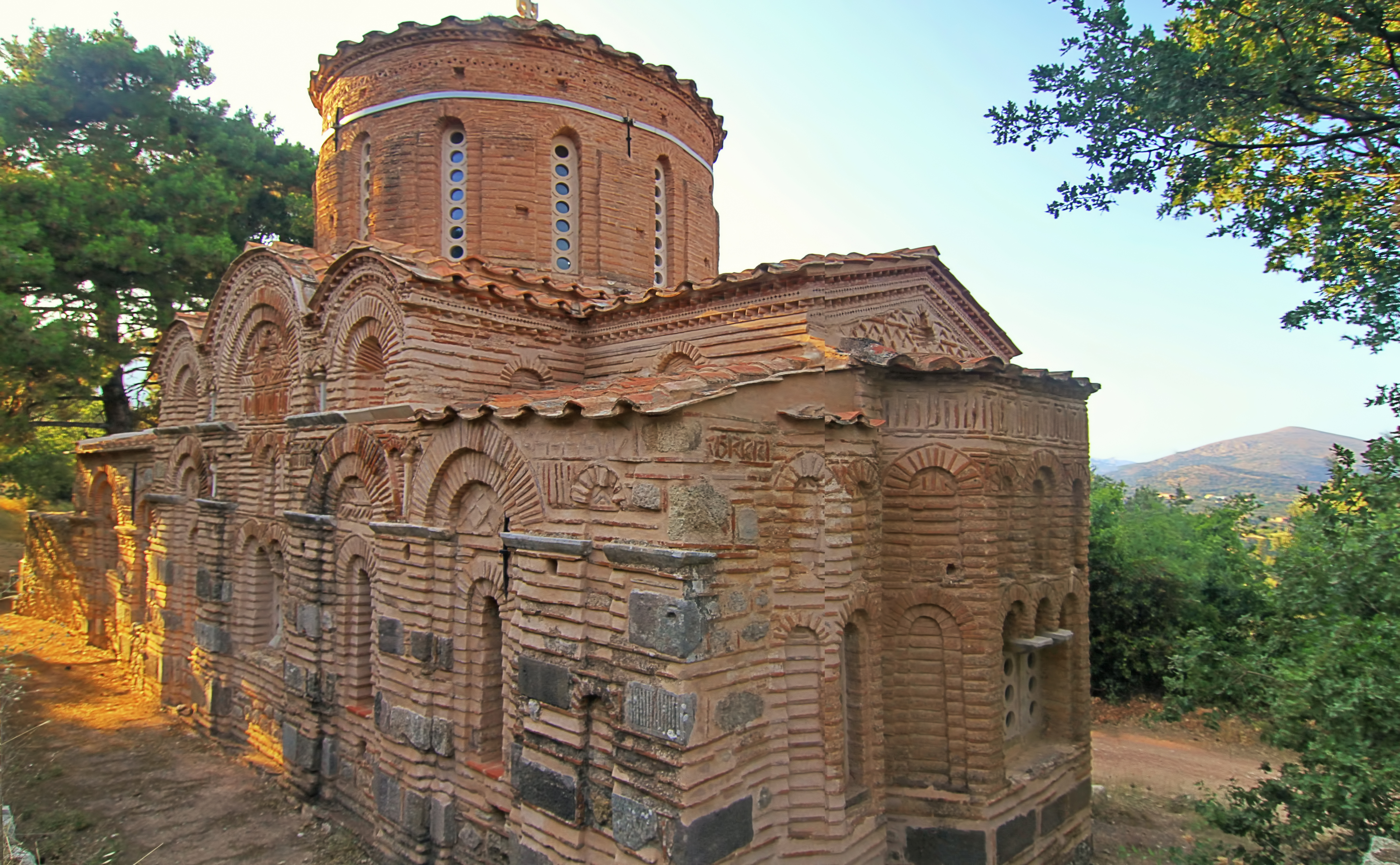
Panagia Krina in Vavili village

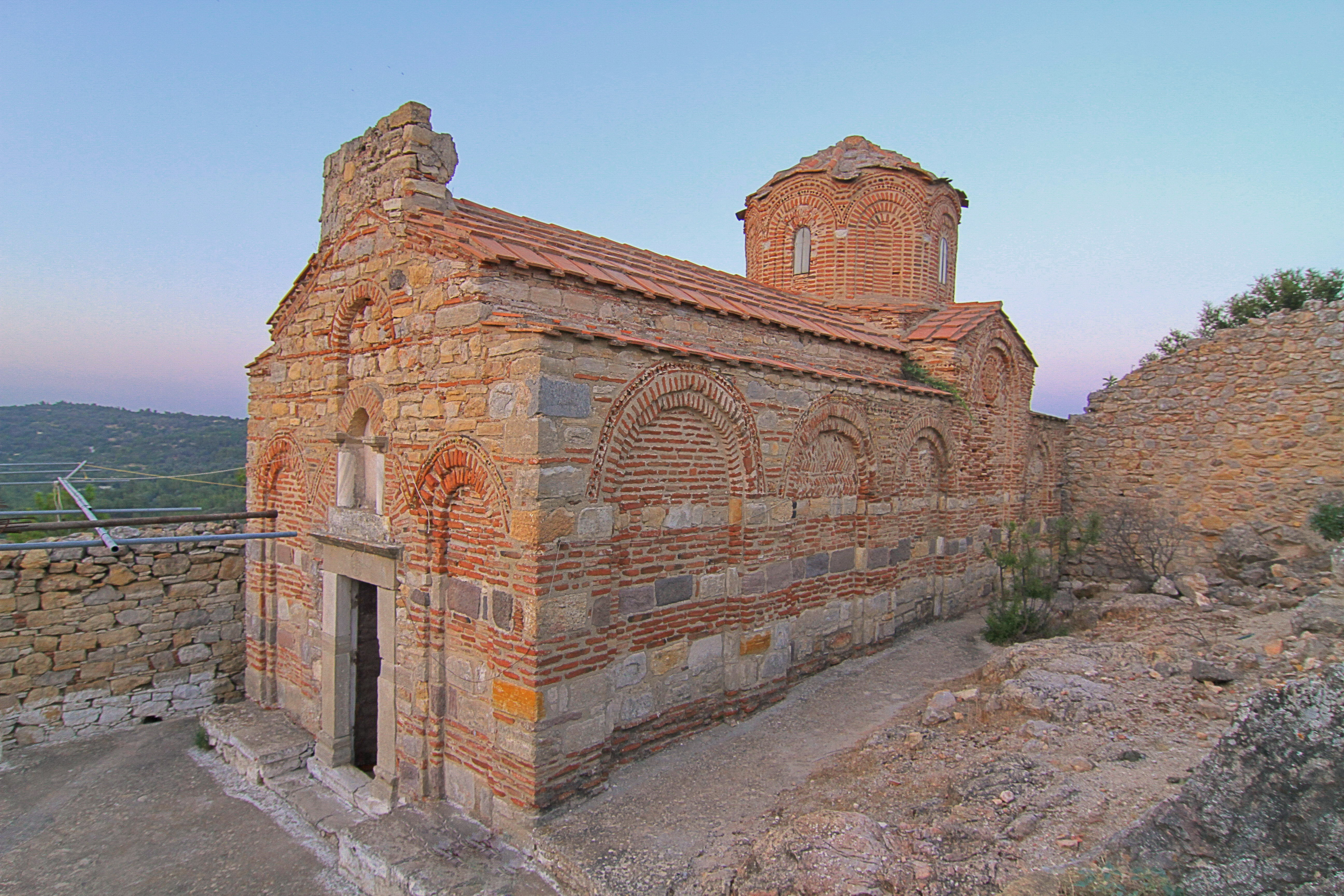
Panagia Sikelia

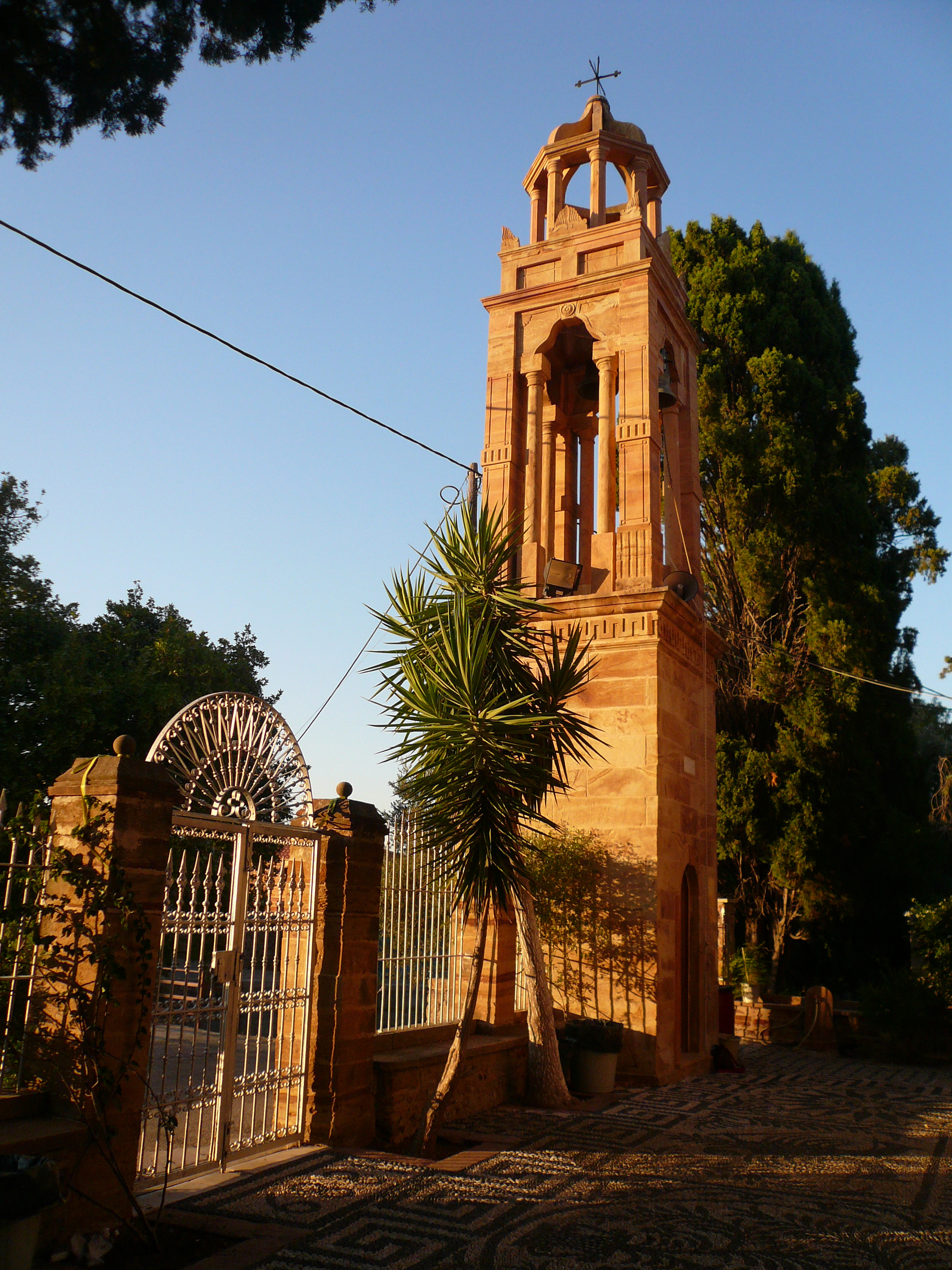
Panagia Agiodektini

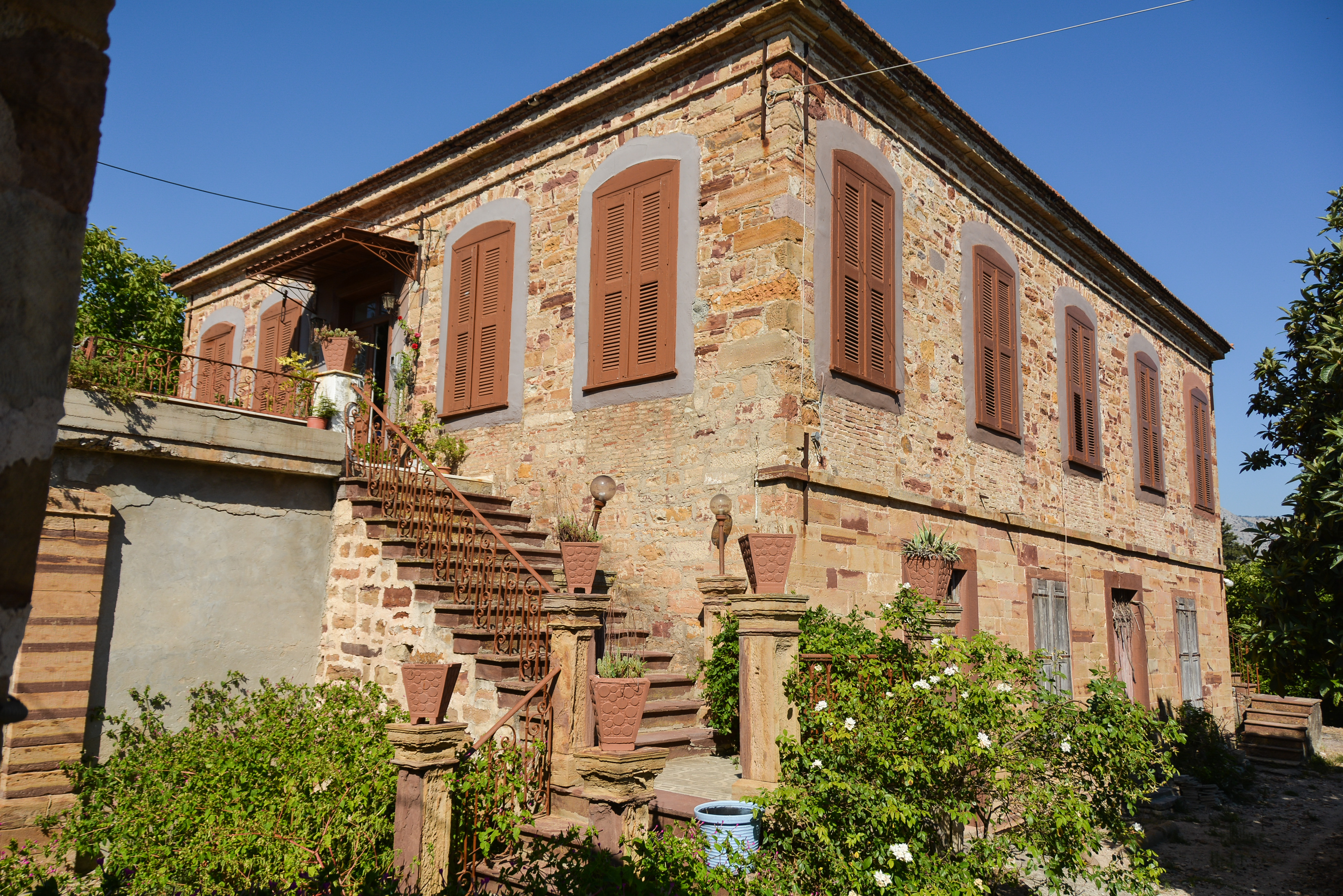
Old house

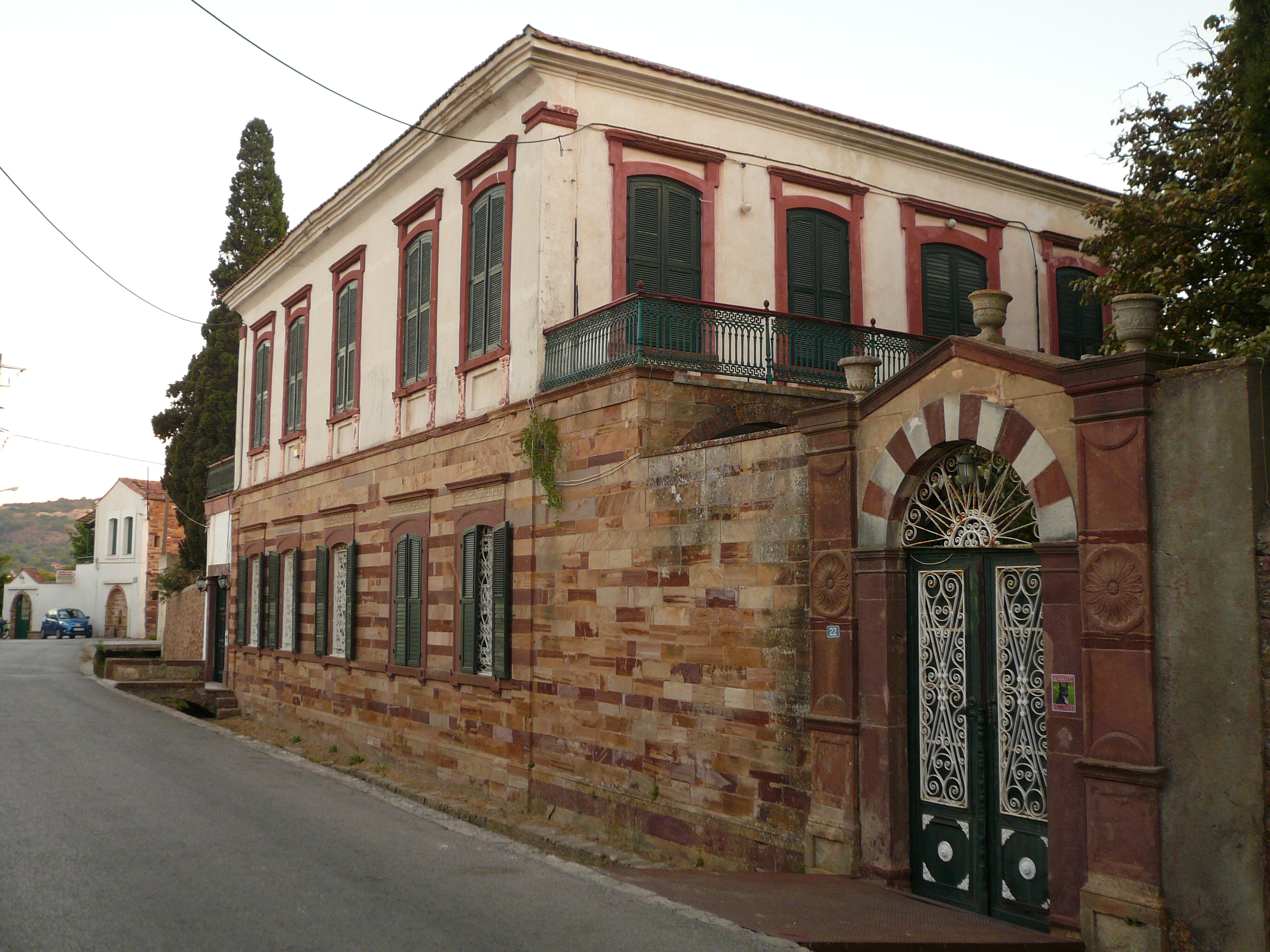
Topaka farm

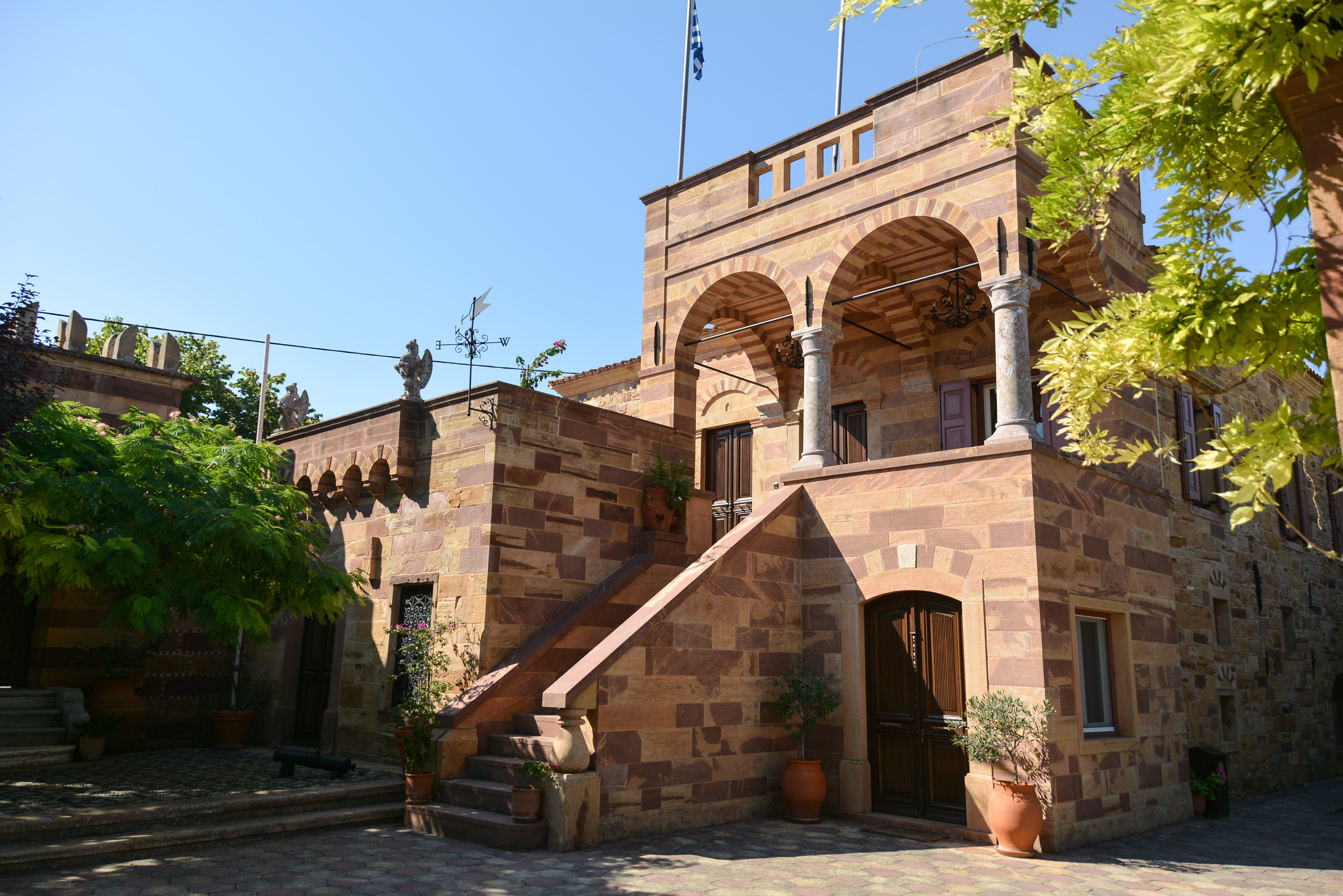
Argenti farm

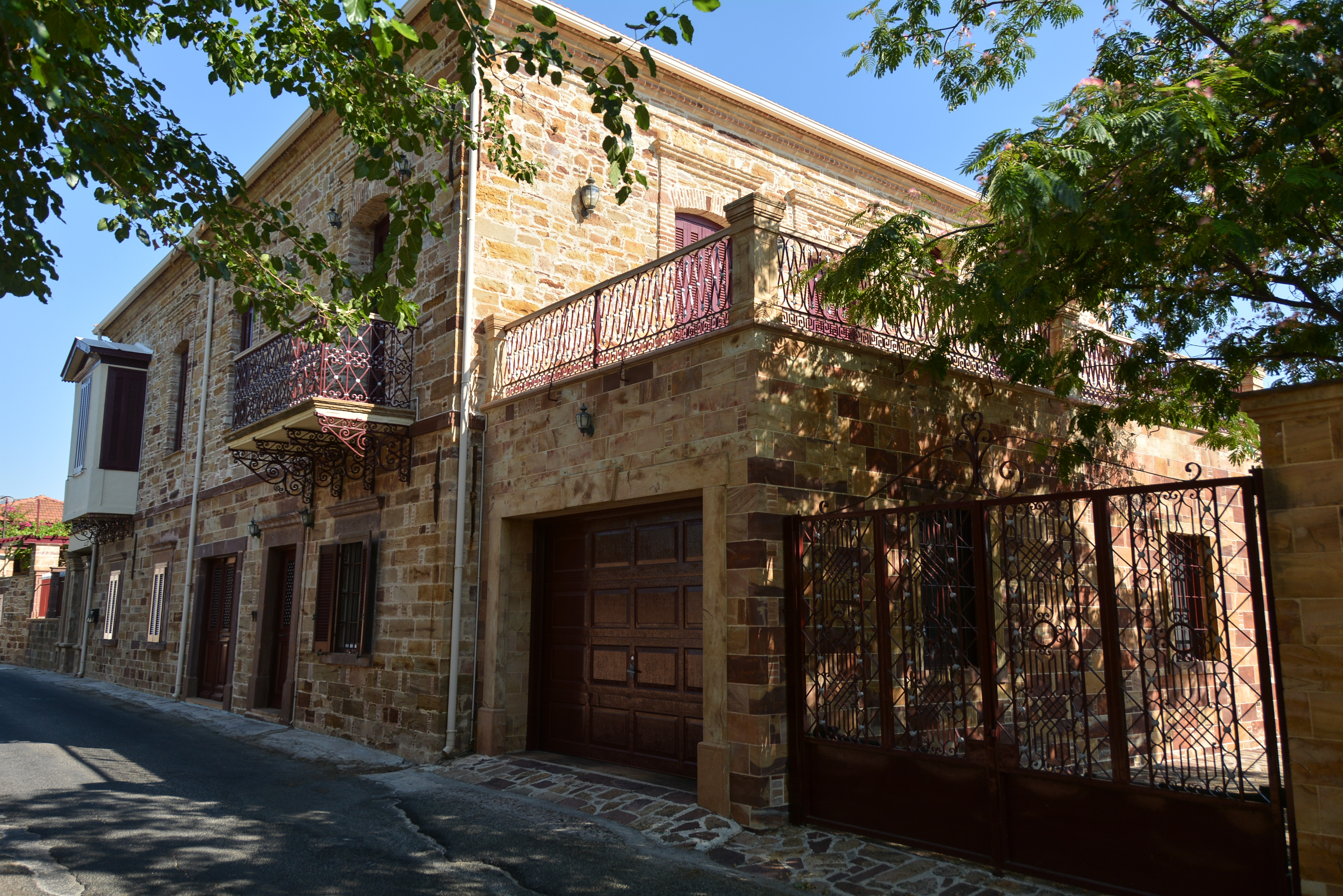
Patrinos farm

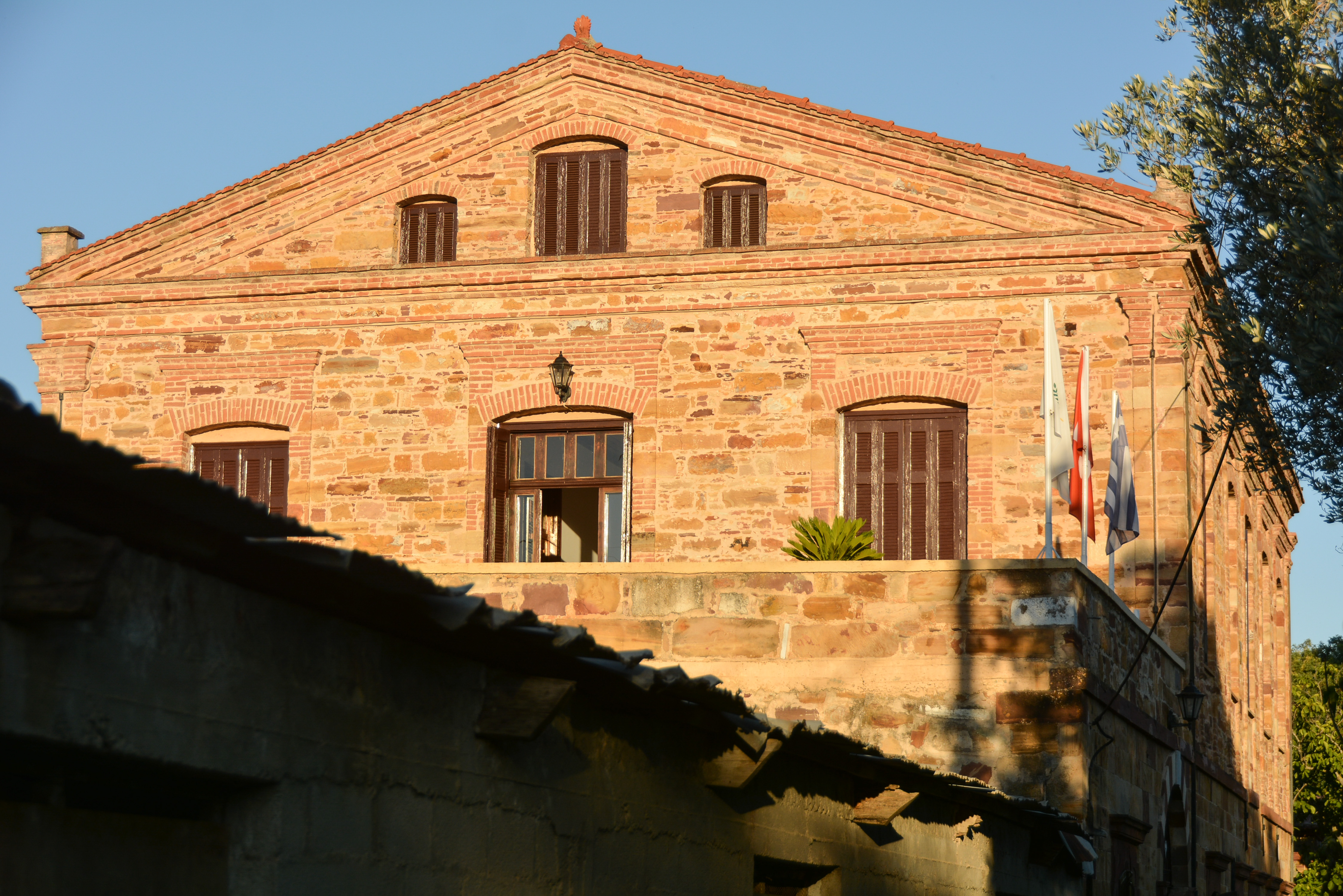
Old building
