= Elata =

Community in Chios, Greece

Elata Ελάτα
- Community
- Location within Greece
- Coordinates: 38°17′N 25°59′E
- Country: Greece
- Administrative region: North Aegean
- Regional unit: Chios
- Municipality: Chios
- Municipal unit: Mastichochoria

Population (2021)
  - Community: 274
- Time zone: UTC+2 (EET)
  - Summer (DST): UTC+3 (EEST)

Elata is a Greek village on the island of Chios. The village is situated on hilly terrain and has a population of several hundred.

== Elata ==
Elata became a village hundreds of years ago when seven tribes came together to protect themselves from Turkish pirates. As a result, they built their village on a hill-side so they could better see ships on the Aegean Sea.

Today, the people of Elata mainly produce agriculture, from which comes almonds, grapes, honey, mastic, and olives. The people of Elata also mine marble. There is also a sizable population of donkeys and goats in Elata.

== Tourism ==
The village of Elata is home to the church of the Holy Trinity. There is also the church of Saint John (Άγιος Γιάννης) an old church that was built during the 14th century. Elata is also home to centuries old buildings, including the remnants of a fort built to protect themselves from pirates, who would sell children into slavery.
