= Karfas =

Karfas Καρφάς
- Settlement
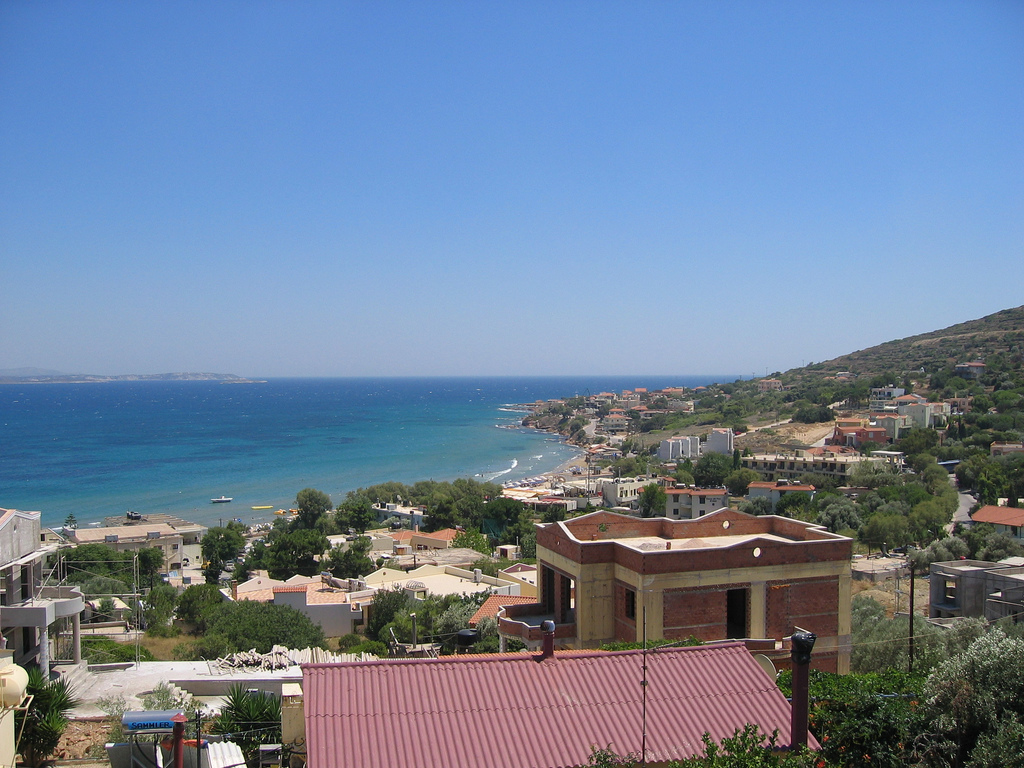
- Panoramic view of Karfas

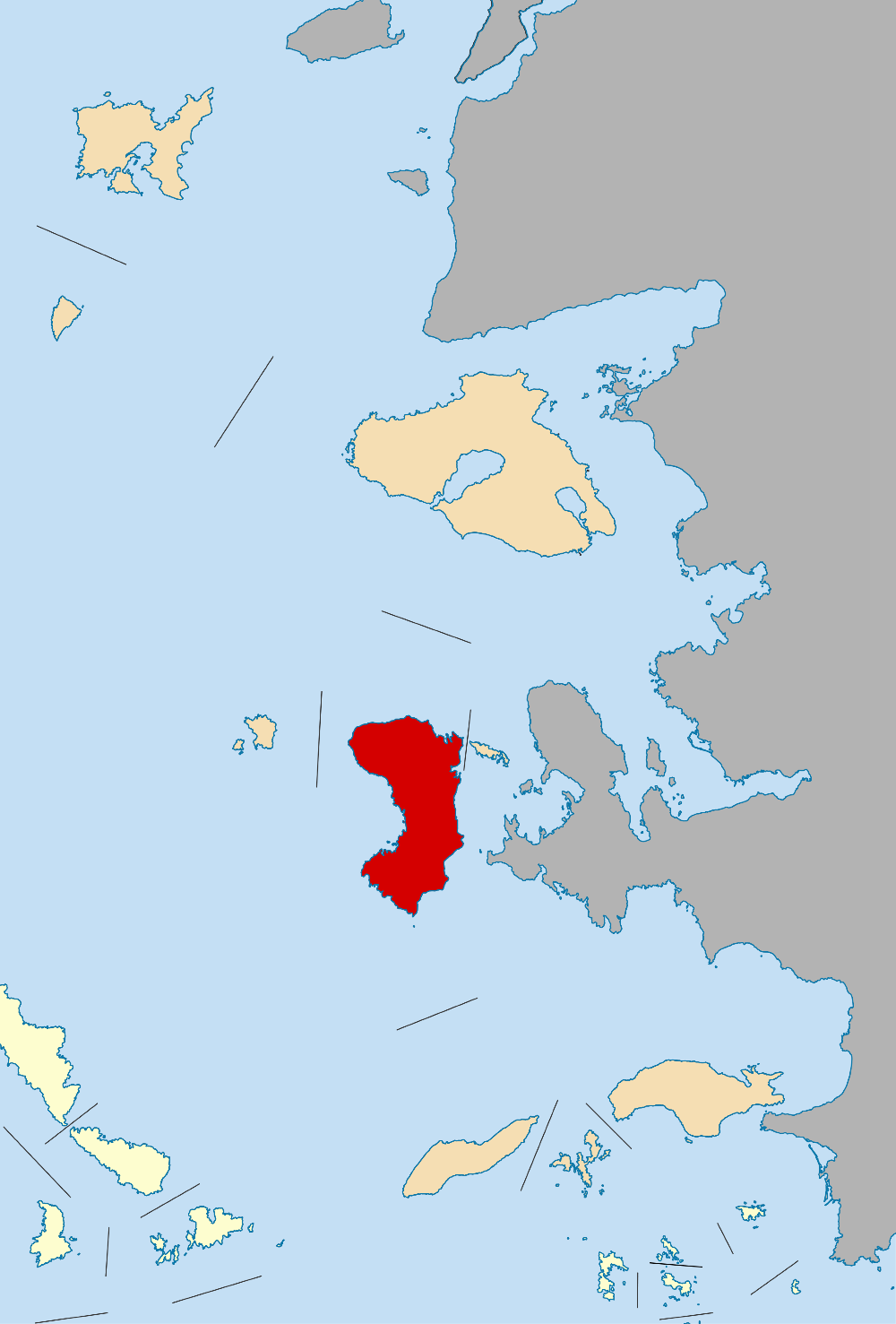

- Location within Greece
- Coordinates: 38°19′N 26°09′E
- Country: Greece
- Administrative region: North Aegean
- Regional unit: Chios
- Municipality: Chios
- Municipal unit: Agios Minas
- Community: Thymiana

Population (2021)
  - Total: 386
- Time zone: UTC+2 (EET)
  - Summer (DST): UTC+3 (EEST)

Karfas (Greek: Καρφάς) is a small town on the island of Chios, Greece. Located 7 kilometers south of Chios (town), Karfas is among the most popular destinations on the Island, attracting high amounts of tourism due to its cosmopolitan beaches, studios, residences, clubs, restaurants, and general nightlife. Karfas is approximately 3 kilometers from Chios Island National Airport.

== Region ==
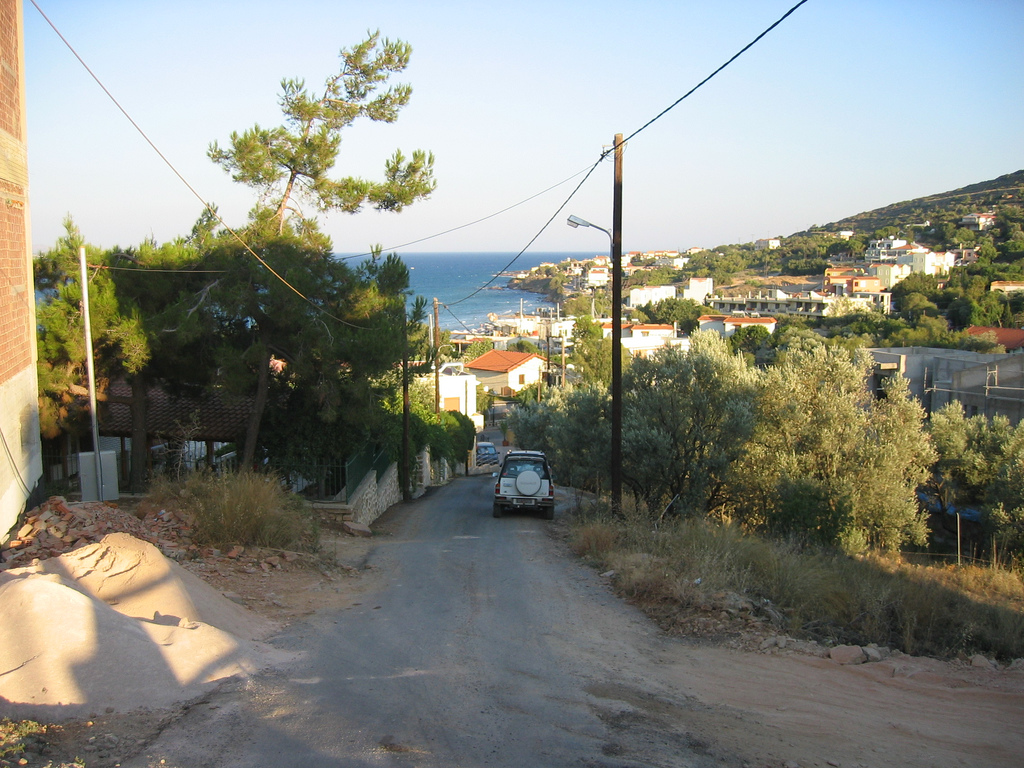
Back roads of Karfas

Karfas is located on the eastern coast just seven kilometers south from Chios Town, and 3 kilometers from the Chios Airport, in the Kambos region. Nearby Karfas, there is a small village called Ayia Ermioni (Άγια Ερμιόνη), which also is a large tourist spot.

== Demographics ==
According to the 2021 census, Karfas had a permanent population of 386. While the residential population is low, during the summer months Karfas attracts thousands of tourists to the area.

== Tourism ==
Karfas is the most popular area that tourists flock to in Chios, due to its cosmopolitan sandy beaches, nightlife, and several other tourist attractions. The alleged peak season for tourism is July–August.
