= Karaburun Peninsula, Turkey =

Peninsula in the extreme western end of the Republic of Turkey

Coordinates: 38°17′32″N 26°32′45″E

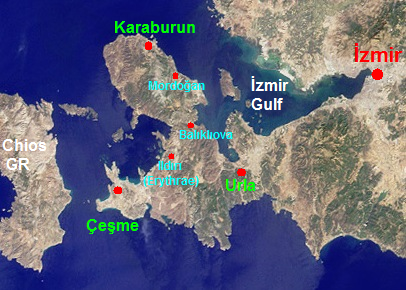
Map of the Urla-Karaburun-Çeşme Peninsula at the western end of Turkey, including the Karaburun peninsula in the northwest.

The Karaburun Peninsula is a peninsula in the extreme western end of Turkey, a component of the larger Urla-Karaburun-Çeşme Peninsula. The peninsula carries the same name as the town and ilçe (administrative center), Karaburun, located at a pivotal point in its extremity. It is located west of the city of İzmir, comprised wholly within İzmir Province and is surrounded by the Aegean Sea.

The Karaburun peninsula is bounded on the west by the Chios Strait, on the northeast and east by the İzmir Gulf, and on the south by an isthmus in stretching between the village Balıklıova in the southeast and the Gerence Bay in the southwest. In antiquity, the peninsula was known as Melaena (Μέλαινα) and famed for its millstone quarries.

Karaburun has a warm temperature throughout the winter time, 6 to 12 °C. In spring 16 to 22 °C and in the summer 28+ °C.
