= Amani, Greece =

Amani Αμανή
- Municipal unit
- Location within the regional unit

- Location within Greece
- Coordinates: 38°29′N 25°55′E
- Country: Greece
- Administrative region: North Aegean
- Regional unit: Chios
- Municipality: Chios

Area
  - Municipal unit: 158.392 km^{2} (61.155 sq mi)
- Elevation: 84 m (276 ft)

Population (2021)
  - Municipal unit: 946
  - Municipal unit density: 5.97/km^{2} (15.5/sq mi)
- Time zone: UTC+2 (EET)
  - Summer (DST): UTC+3 (EEST)
- Postal code: 821 03
- Area code: 22740
- Vehicle registration: ΧΙ
- Website: amani.gr

Amani (Greek: Αμανή) is a former municipality on the island of Chios, North Aegean, Greece. Since the 2011 local government reform it is part of the municipality Chios, of which it is a municipal unit. It is located in the northwestern part of the island, and has a land area of 158.392 km². Its population was 946 at the 2021 census. The seat of the municipality was in Volissos. Its next largest town is Parpariá.
