= Dafnonas, Chios =

Village on the island of Chios, Greece

Dafnonas Δαφνώνας
- Community
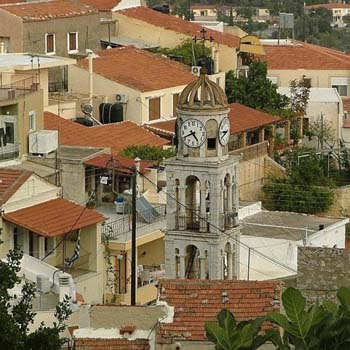

- Location within Greece
- Coordinates: 38°20′49″N 26°04′44″E
- Country: Greece
- Administrative region: North Aegean
- Regional unit: Chios
- Municipality: Chios
- Municipal unit: Kampochora

Population (2021)
  - Community: 366
- Time zone: UTC+2 (EET)
  - Summer (DST): UTC+3 (EEST)

Dafnonas (Greek: Δαφνώνας) is a village on the center of the island of Chios, located in the North Aegean islands region of Greece. Its population was 366 as of the 2021 census. It is located in the central part of the island, just 3 mi (4.8 km) west of the island's biggest and main city, Chios (town). The village got its name from the Greek word Dafnes (Δάφνες), which translates to laurels. The favored Saint of the village is Saint Panteleimon, whose feast day, July 27 is celebrated by the two main churches of the village, St. Panteleimon and St. George.

== History ==
According to local tradition, the village was founded in a different location and was moved to its current location in the 10th century AD. In the northern area of the village there are ruins of medieval structures, which are apparently the remains of the fortified medieval settlement of Dafnonas. These structures show the mark that the Genoese left on the island during their rule in the 14th to 16th centuries.
