= Mausoleum of the 40 Martyrs =

World War II memorial in Umbria, Italy

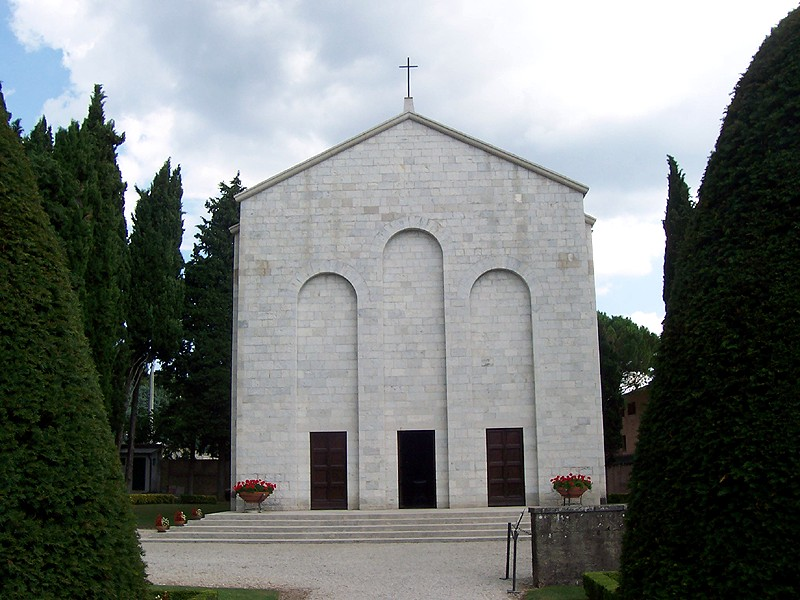
Outside of the Mausoleum of the 40 Martyrs

The Mausoleo dei 40 Martiri is a modern memorial chapel and garden located in Gubbio, region of Umbria, Italy, built in memory of Italians massacred by retreating German troops in 1944.

== History ==
On June 20, 1944, partisans killed a German lieutenant and wounded a soldier at the caffè Nafissi in central Gubbio. The Germans had threatened strict reprisals on the populace for any attacks on their troops: 40 citizens for every officer and 20 for every soldier. While the Germans were preparing a withdrawal to the Gothic line, they randomly rounded citizens and despite the pleas by the local bishop, two days later the 40 citizens were massacred under orders by General Dr Johann Karl Boelsen, commander of the 114th Jäger Division. They were shot against a wall located at the site of the Mausoleum. Those killed included individuals of all ages, both sexes, and diverse lines of work.

The Mausoleum was erected in 1949, with commission given to Pietro Porcinai (1910-1986). The original plan was a simple and sober mausoleum circumscribed by 40 slender cypress trees. The small space and location have made the tree plan difficult. The mausoleum contains 40 marble sarcophagi, most with photographs and names. A section of the wall against which they were killed remains.
