= Urla-Karaburun-Çeşme Peninsula =

Turkish peninsula

Coordinates: 38°18′N 26°36′E

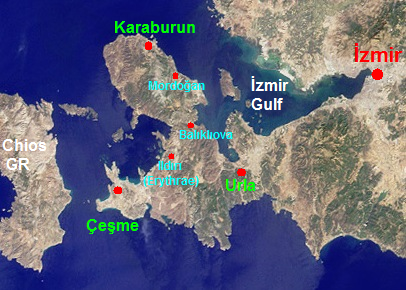
The Urla-Karaburun-Çeşme Peninsula

The Urla-Karaburun-Çeşme Peninsula (Turkish: Urla-Çeşme-Karaburun Yarımadası) also known as the Urla Peninsula (Urla Yarımadası) or the İzmir Peninsula, is a large peninsula in western Turkey, in İzmir Province.

The peninsula extends from İzmir to the west, into the Aegean Sea, and lies opposite the Greek island of Chios. At an area of 171,000 hectares, it is one of the largest peninsulas in Turkey, and its ports, size, and location have given it a strategic role in Turkey's past.

The peninsula is divided into three parts: Urla in the east, Karaburun in the north, and Çeşme in the southwest. A narrow strip of plain on the east divides the Urla region of the peninsula from the western extension of Mount Nif and the Bozdağlar mountains. The Karaburun ("black cape") peninsula in the north is either named for its dark colored cliffs or according to the old Turkish convention for the cardinal directions. Çeşme, one of the northernmost cities on the Turkish Riviera, is "the most important tourist center in the İzmir metropolitan area."

Archeological excavations have uncovered signs of human habitation in the peninsula as early as the Neolithic. In antiquity, the region was known as the Peninsula of the Teians and the Erythraeans, according to the geographer Strabo, or more simply the Peninsula of Erythrae. The mountain range running north to south on the peninsula was called Mount Mimas, and is geographically an extension of Mount Tmolus (Bozdağ). In the Odyssey, Nestor tells Telemachus that some of the Greeks returning from Troy considered sailing between Chios and "the stormy headland of Mimas." The three promontories formed by Mount Mimas were Melaena (present-day Karaburun), Argennum (Çeşme) and Coryceum (Koraka Burnu, in the south). Alexander the Great sought to cut a canal through the isthmus of the peninsula near Urla in order to connect the Hermaean Bay (İzmir Gulf) and the Caÿstrian Bay (Gulf of Kuşadası), but he failed to do so.
