= Agios Minas =

Agios Minas Άγιος Μηνάς
- Municipal unit
- Location within the regional unit

- Location within Greece
- Coordinates: 38°19′N 26°08′E
- Country: Greece
- Administrative region: North Aegean
- Regional unit: Chios
- Municipality: Chios

Area
  - Municipal unit: 13.049 km^{2} (5.038 sq mi)

Population (2021)
  - Municipal unit: 3,490
  - Municipal unit density: 267/km^{2} (693/sq mi)
- Time zone: UTC+2 (EET)
  - Summer (DST): UTC+3 (EEST)
- Vehicle registration: ΧΙ

Agios Minas (Greek: Άγιος Μηνάς) is a former municipality on the island of Chios, North Aegean, Greece. Since the 2011 local government reform it is part of the municipality Chios, of which it is a municipal unit. It is located on the central east coast of the island, just south of Chios (town). Its land area is 13.049 km². Its population was 3,490 at the 2021 census. The seat of the municipality was in Thymiana. Its next largest town is Neochori.
