= Volissos =

Volissos Βολισσός
- Community
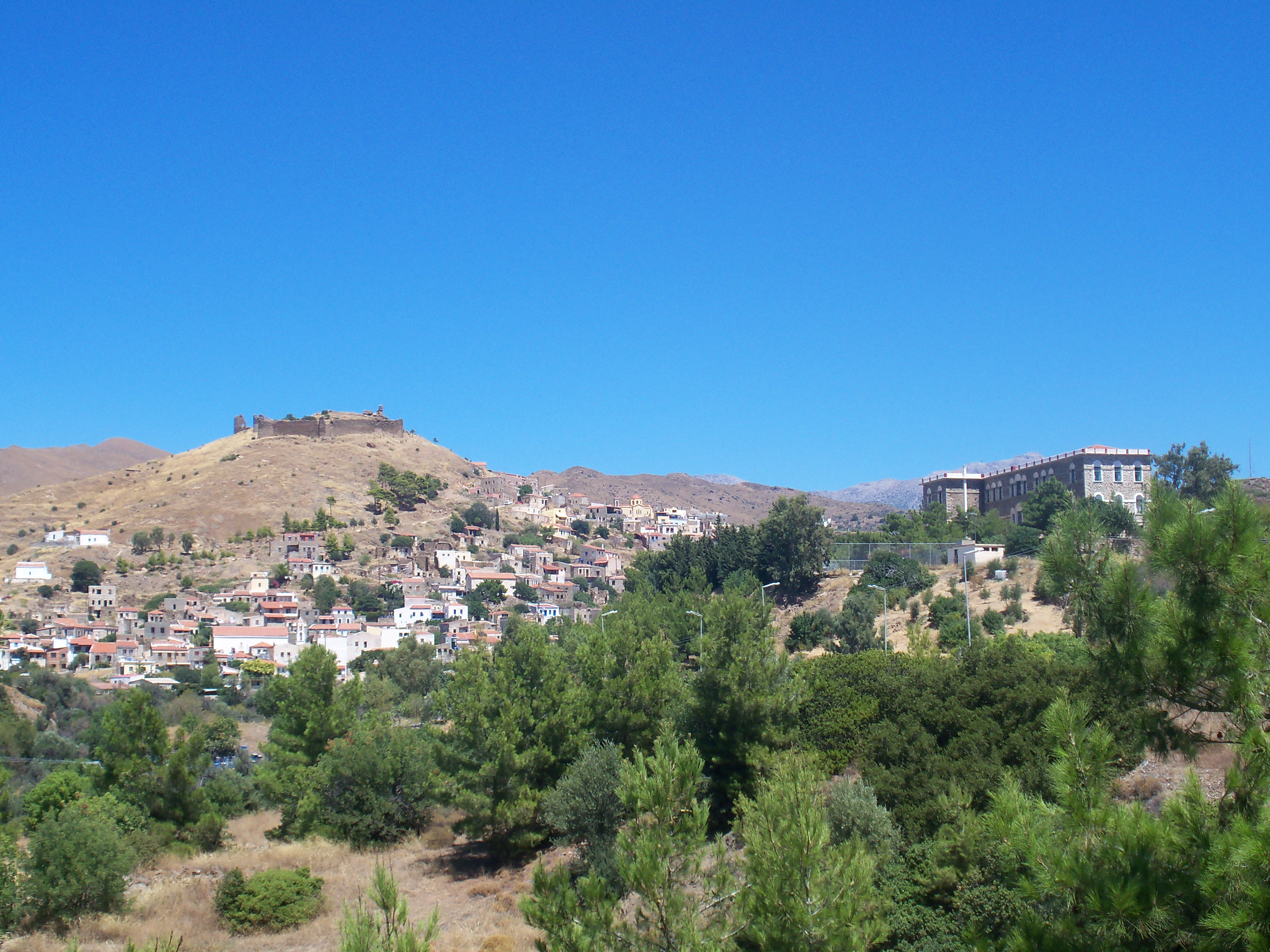
- View of Volissos

- Location within Greece
- Coordinates: 38°29′N 25°58.5′E
- Country: Greece
- Administrative region: North Aegean
- Regional unit: Chios
- Municipality: Chios
- Municipal unit: Amani

Population (2021)
  - Community: 480
- Time zone: UTC+2 (EET)
  - Summer (DST): UTC+3 (EEST)
- Postal code: 821 03
- Area code: 22740
- Vehicle registration: ΧΙ

Volissos (Greek: Βολισσός) is the largest village in the northwest part of Chios, Aegean Islands, Greece. The village is situated 40 km away from the main town of Chios.

Volissos has a port called Limia that connects the island with the island of Psara.The village is built in amphitheatrical style on a hill and on top of it there is a Byzantine castle built in the medieval times. The castle has a trapezoid shape with six circular towers.

Volissos is claimed to be one of the possible birthplaces of Homer; Herodotus makes a reference to Homer having lived and written his marvelous epics in this village. In Christian Greek mythology, Volissos is famed as the birthplace of Saint Markella of Chios.

== The village ==
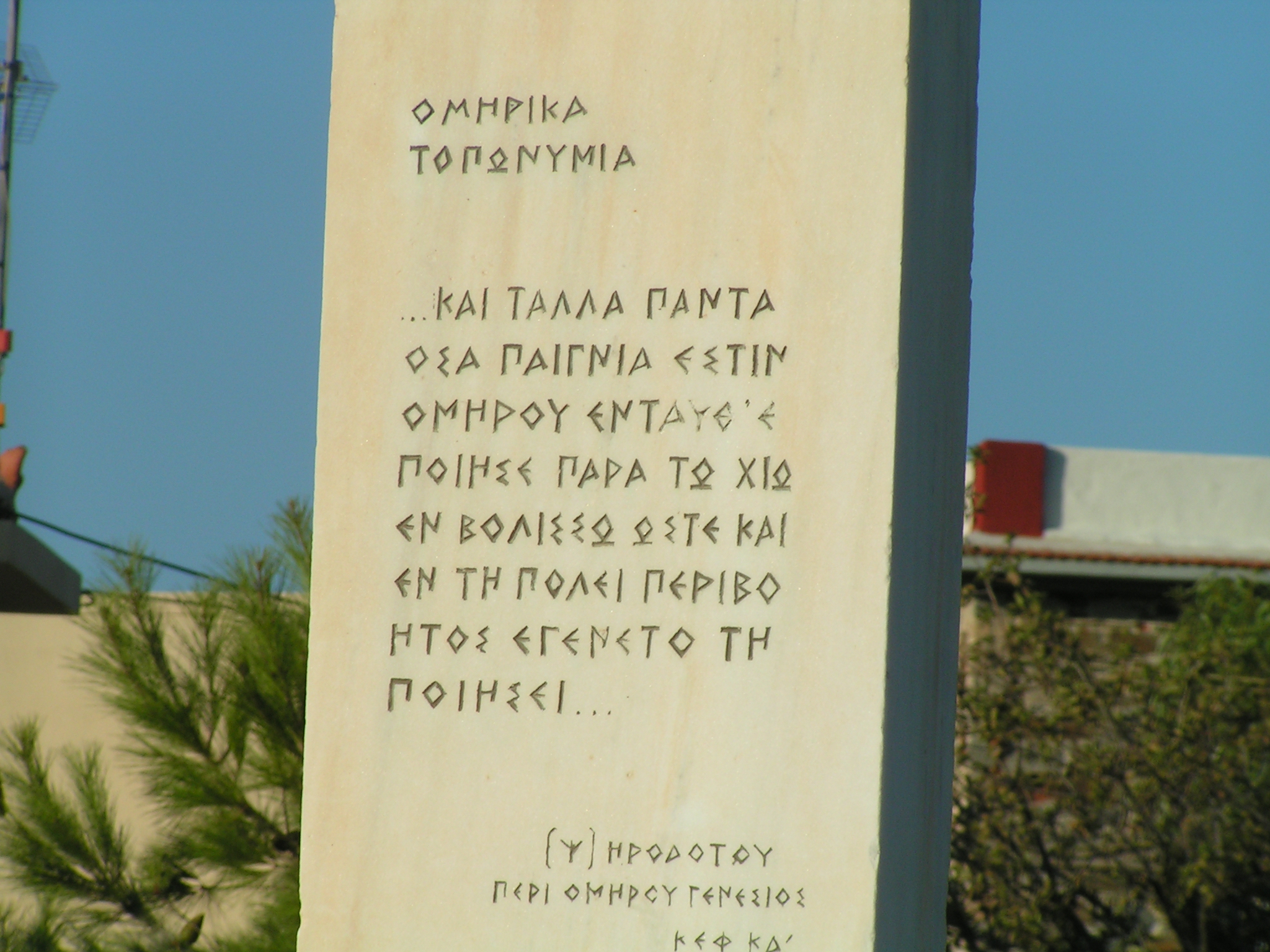
Marble plate at the entrance of Volissos showing an excerpt from Herodotus script in ancient Greek on Homer's life. The plate refers that Homer lived and wrote his epic poems in the village of Volissos

Volissos has one school that acts as both a primary school and a high school, also serving the surrounding villages. Over the years, enrolment has been declining noticeably as younger generations continue to leave for academic and economic opportunities in the mainland.

The village has a post-office, a pharmacy, a small doctor's surgery, a police station, a small museum, three mini-markets, four taverns, a butchery, a traditional bakery, several traditional cafeterias and two gas-stations located 4 km away on the road to Chios town. There is also a small crêperie near the castle with nice view. Volissos is situated about 1,5 km away from the seaside and its port. Inside the village the main square is called "Christos" square and the next large one is called "Pythonas" square. Each square has its own church. There are several rooms to let in the village most of them located near the castle on the top of the hill.

== The surroundings ==
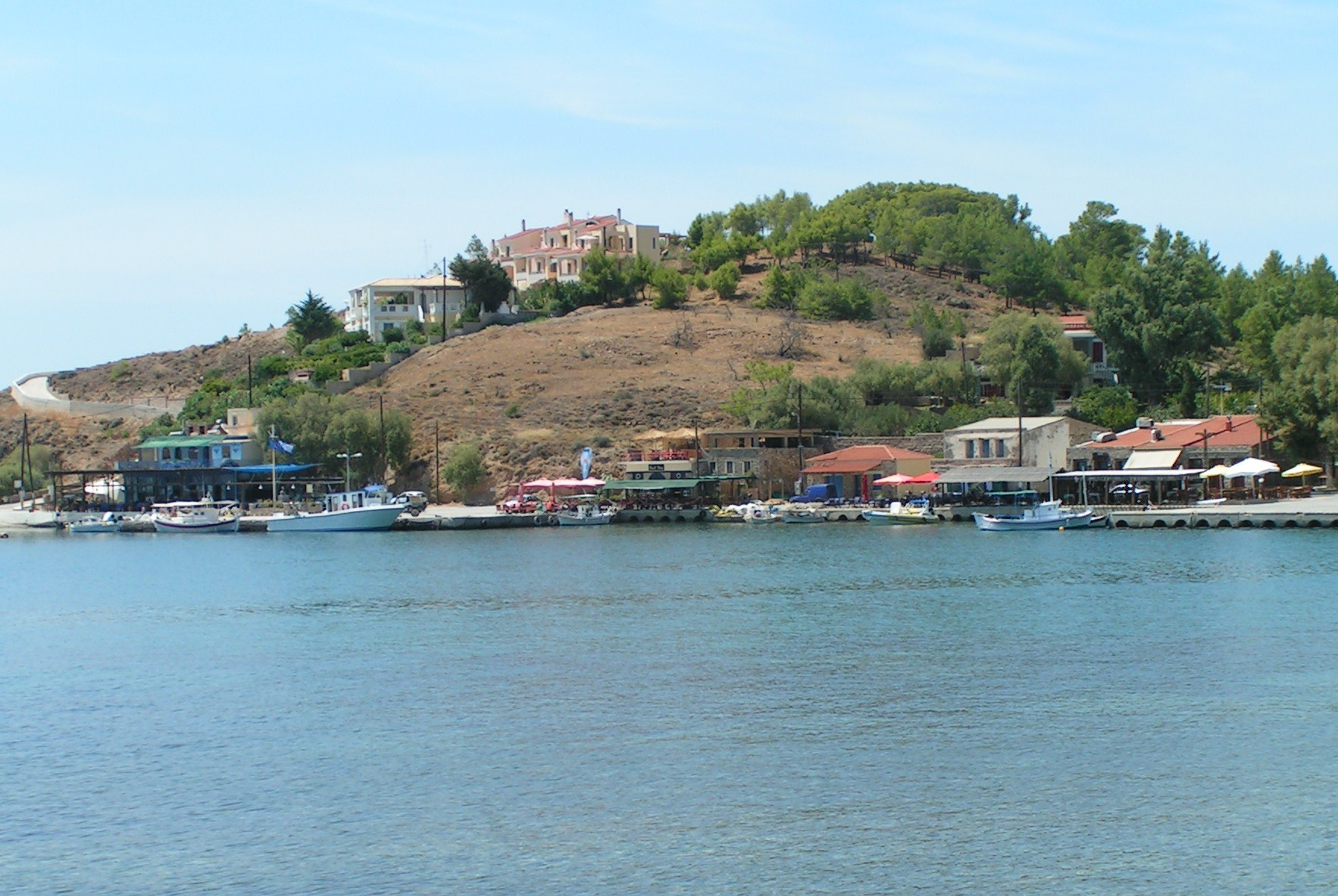
View of Limia, the port of Volissos

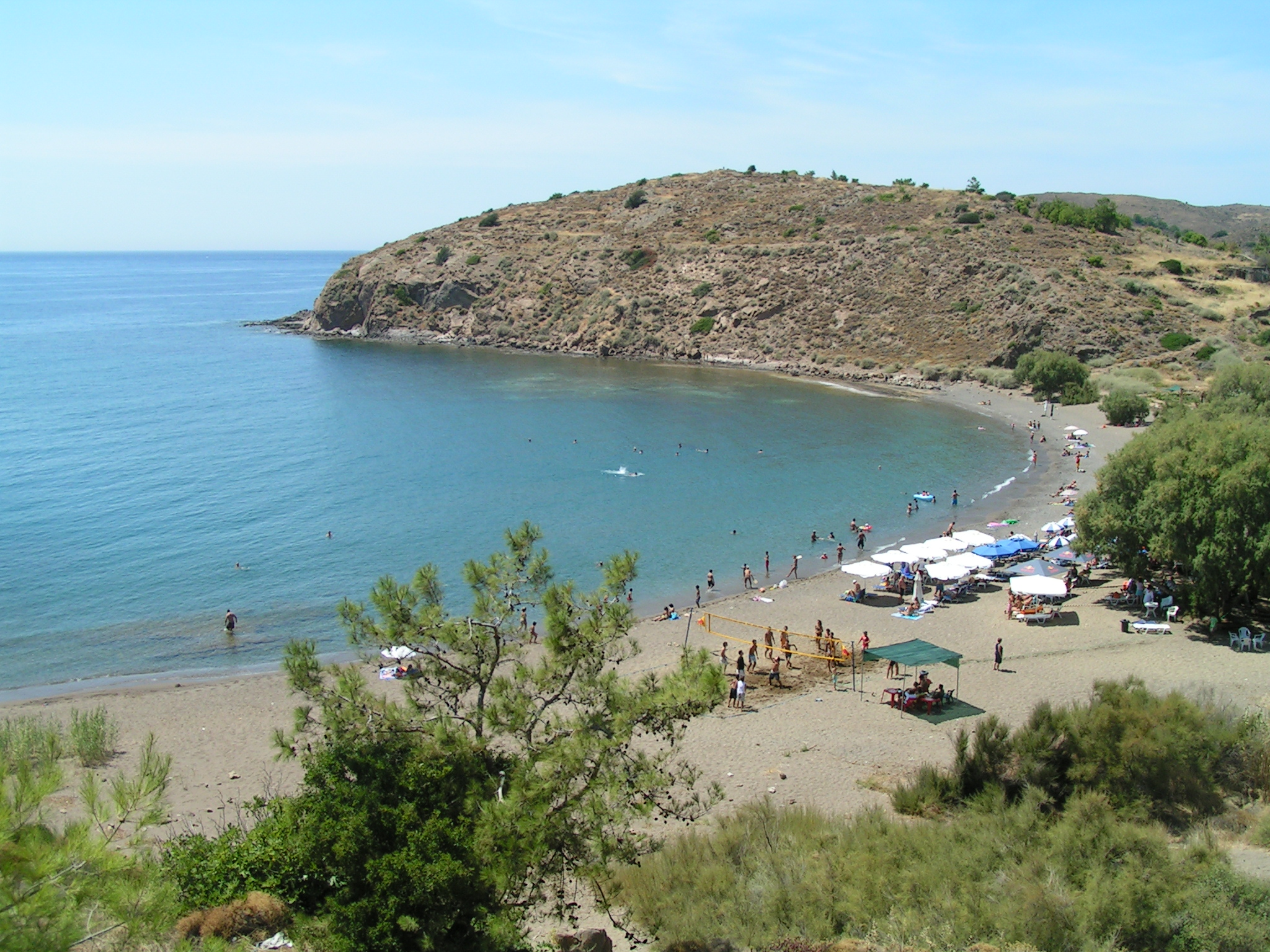
View of Lefkathia beach

Mountains dominate the northwestern part of the municipality including the highest peak on the island at 1267m, the "Pellinaion" mountain. "Limia" is the port of Volissos. It has three restaurants, a hotel and two bars. From the northwest side of the port are the beaches "Lefkathia", "Limnos", "Lampsa", "Vakelonas" and "Aghia Markella", where the monastery of Markella of Chios is established. Heading south next to the port of "Limia", there is a large beach starting from "Gonia" beach to "Magemena" beach ending at "Managros" beach. There are seasonal beach-bars at the beaches "Lefkathia", "Limnos", "Gonia" and "Magemena". "Limnos" beach has also two restaurants and a patisserie. There are rooms to let at the beaches of "Lefkathia", "Limnos", "Gonia" and "Managros".

== Festivals ==
- On 22 July is the nameday and celebration of Markella of Chios and thousands of worshipers are coming from all over the island and the country to celebrate. Holy water springs from a hole just beside the cold sea. The previous night on 21 July, a large music festival is taking place at the port of "Limia" where hundreds of young people are coming from all over the island to party.
- On 28 July is the nameday and celebration of Saint Panteleon and sometimes a traditional festival takes place in the village.
- On 6 August is the nameday and celebration of the Christ and a traditional festival is taking place in the village at the "Christos" square. On "Christos" square there is a church devoted to the Christ.
- On 15 August is the nameday and celebration of Mary (mother of Jesus) and a traditional festival is taking place in the second square of the village, the "Pythonas" square. On "Pythonas" square there is a church devoted to Mary.

== Historical population ==
The population of the village has declined since the 1950s. This is largely due to better perceived economic opportunities existing in the main town of Chios (Chora) or on the mainland, in larger cities like Athens, as younger generations begin to stray away from the typical rural livelihood of the island.

Year	Population
1951	1.087
1961	936
1971	676
1981	479
1991	404
2001	417
2011	313
2021	480

== See also ==
- List of settlements in the Chios regional unit
