= Saint Markella =

Greek saint

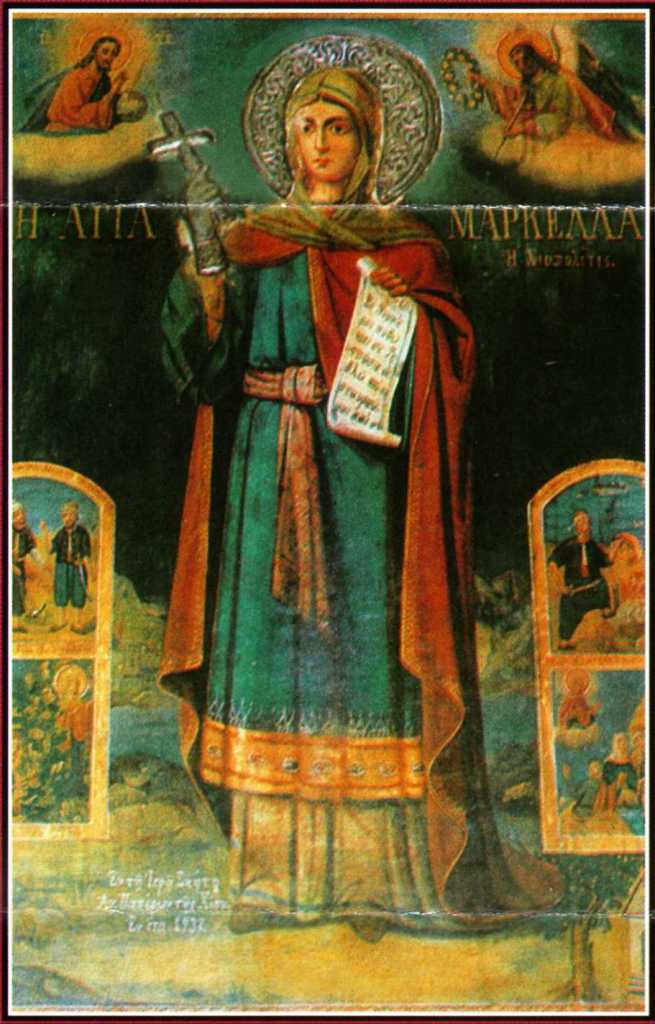

Martyr
- Born: 14th century Volissos, Chios, Greece
- Venerated in: Eastern Orthodox Church
- Major shrine: Church near her place of death. The icon of Saint Markella is one of the most revered and is said to be miraculous.
- Feast: 22 July
- Attributes: palm branch, cross, scroll, (occasionally) being beheaded by her father
- Patronage: Chios

Saint Markella or Marcella (Greek: Μαρκέλλα) was an inhabitant of 14th-century Chios who was canonized by the Greek Orthodox Church. Her feast day is celebrated on 22 July.

== Life ==
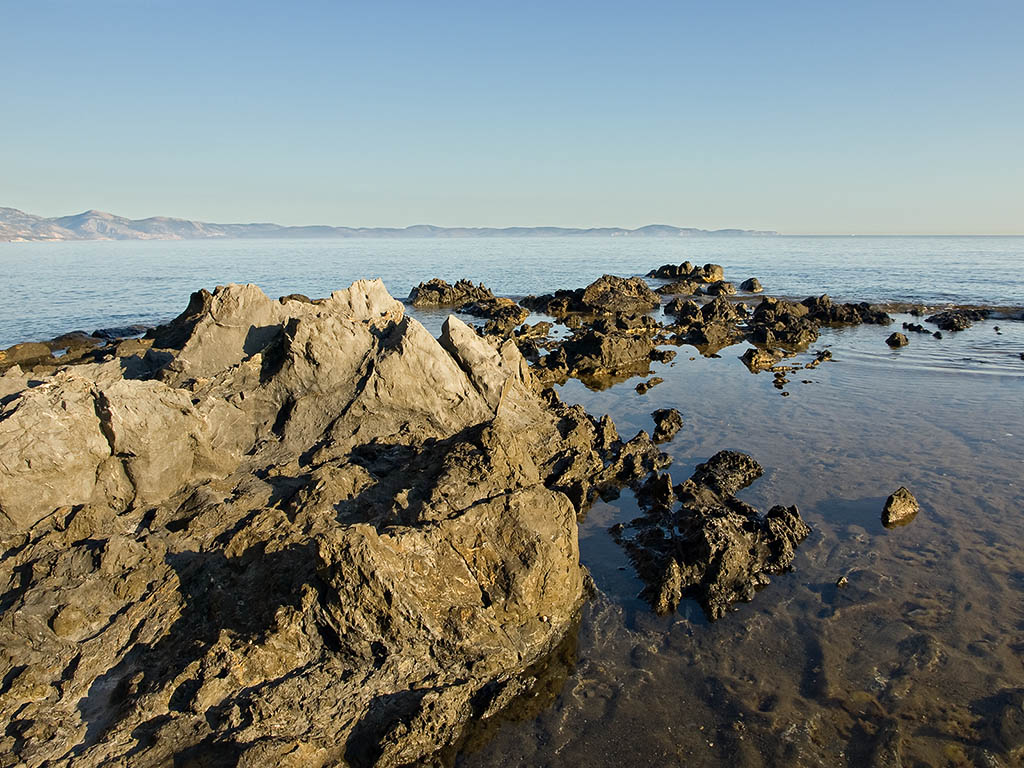
Saint Markella rocks today, Chios.

Information about her life and martyrdom was unknown as stated in the synaxarium of 1810, as well as of 1868 which quoted only some information about her ritual worship in Chios. Also mentioned by Leo Allatius in 1648, without any attributions of her identity. In the 1860s, her date of birth appears around 1500 AD for the first time. This chronology doesn't concur with the account of Leo Allatius who seems to have little information about her (he was born in 1586 and the memories of her life would still be fresh) and probably the events of her life will go further back in time.

Therefore, based on the tradition that started in the 19th century, it is said that Saint Markella was born and lived in Volissos, Chios, Greece. She was raised as a devout Christian by her mother. However, her father (in some accounts) was a pagan.

St. Markella lived during the 14th century - during most of which Chios was under Genoese rule. At a young age, her mother died and St. Markella continued to study the Bible, pray to God and live a life according to what she was taught.

Around the time of her eighteenth birthday, the virtuous St. Markella had to flee the fury of her violent father. There are variant accounts given about the reasons for that. In one version, while St. Markella's late mother had been a Christian, her father was an idolater and he tried very hard to force his daughter to become an idolater, too; this seems anachronistic, since by the 14th Century paganism was long since extinct in Greece. By another version, the problem was that St. Markella's father was consumed with incestuous lust for her, and she fled in horror when he declared his intentions.

Whatever her reason for being afraid of her father, St. Markella fled to nearby mountains and hid in a bush. Her father found her with the help of a local herdsmen, and they set fire to the bush to force her to show.

St. Markella ran to the sea to escape but her father aimed an arrow at her and wounded her. As believed by the local people, the blood of the saint dyed the rocks and to this very day, during the festivities for her feast day, at a specific time, her blood becomes visible on these rocks for all the faithful who bear witness to this miracle.

It is further believed that as she was injured, she prayed to Jesus - her final moments spent in prayer requesting that the rocks would open for her to hide from her father and this happened. However, the opened rock enabled her to hide all of her body inside, but not her head. Her father decapitated her and threw the head into the sea. Her head floated to the nearby beach of Komi.

For many years, the locals could not locate the head until one day an Italian (presumably Genoese) warship was in the area. In the evening, the Italians could see a bright light coming from the distance and when they got closer they witnessed a head, floating in the water, lit by upright floating candles. Immediately, they realized that this was a sacred miracle they were witness to and they took the head of the Saint back to their homeland.

Local tradition also has it that holy water springs from the rocks that mark her martyrdom. Many pilgrims visit this location and every year on 22 July, during the commemoration services for the Saint. If a pilgrim's faith is strong, a local tradition is that the water in the rock-pool will feel extremely warm to touch.

== Religious significance ==
Today there is a church on the cave of St. Markella. The rock in which she was killed is said to spring holy water. Her nameday is on 22 July and on that day the sea is said to boil. The icon of St. Markella is one of the most revered and is said to be miraculous.

== Hymns ==
A special prayer (Apolytikion) is dedicated to Saint Markella:

Rose of piety and sprout of Chios, we honour with canticles Saint Markella who was beheaded by her father's hand, as she guarded the commands of Christ, give strength and save from danger, us who cry unto you. Glory to Him who gave you strength, glory to Him who crowned you. Glory to Him who works through you, healings for all the faithful.

== See also ==
- Metropolis of Chios
