= Anavatos =

Ghost town on Chios, Greece

Coordinates: 38°24′08″N 26°01′12″E

Anavatos (Greek: Ανάβατος) is a medieval, mostly abandoned, village on the Greek island of Chios, 16 km from the town Chios.

Created in the Byzantine era, probably by workers of the Nea Moni of Chios, the village was abandoned after the Massacre of Chios in 1822 and the earthquake of 1881. According to the 2021 census there were 10 inhabitants.

Above the village stands the medieval fortress.

== Gallery ==
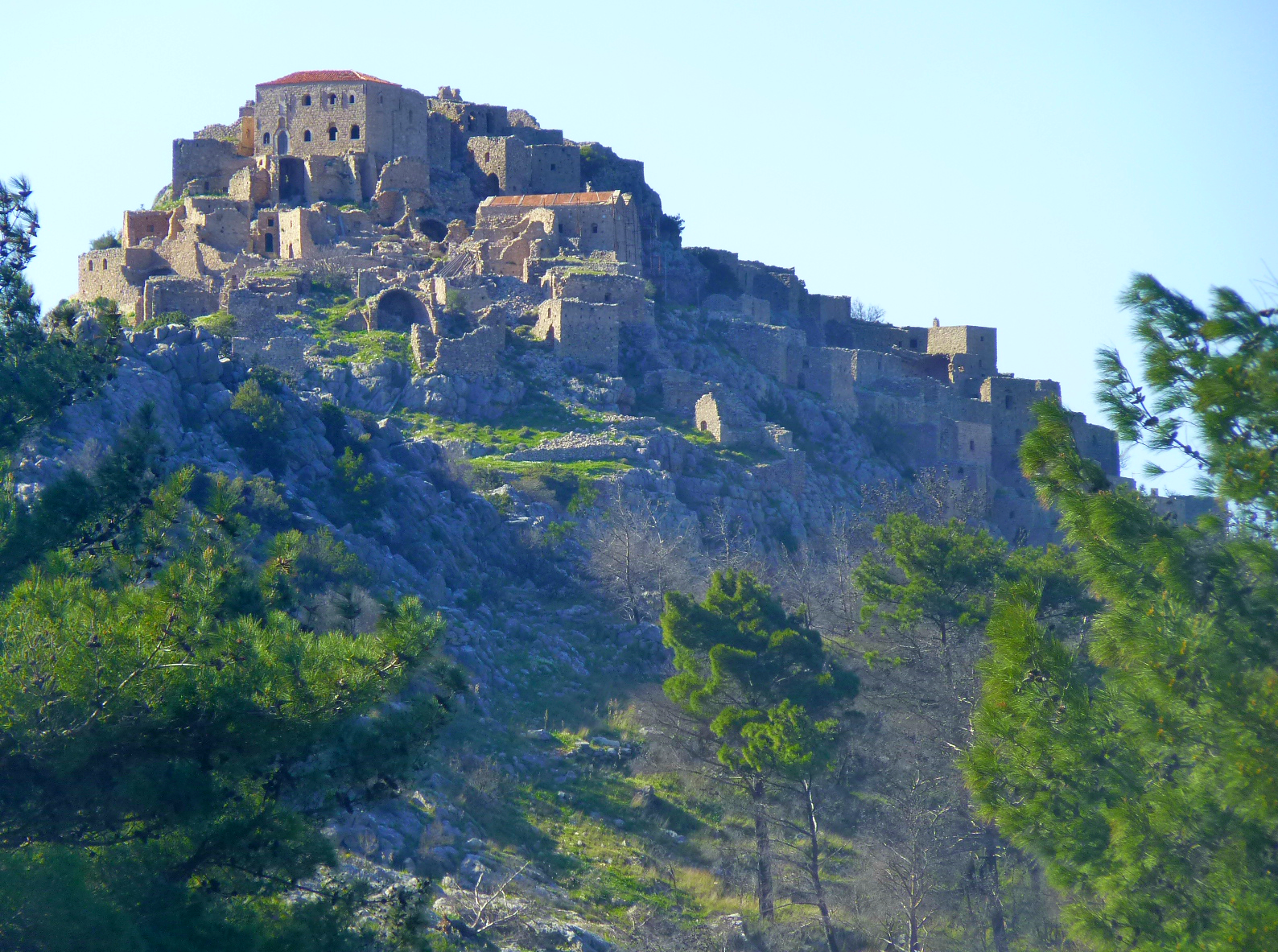
View of Anavatos

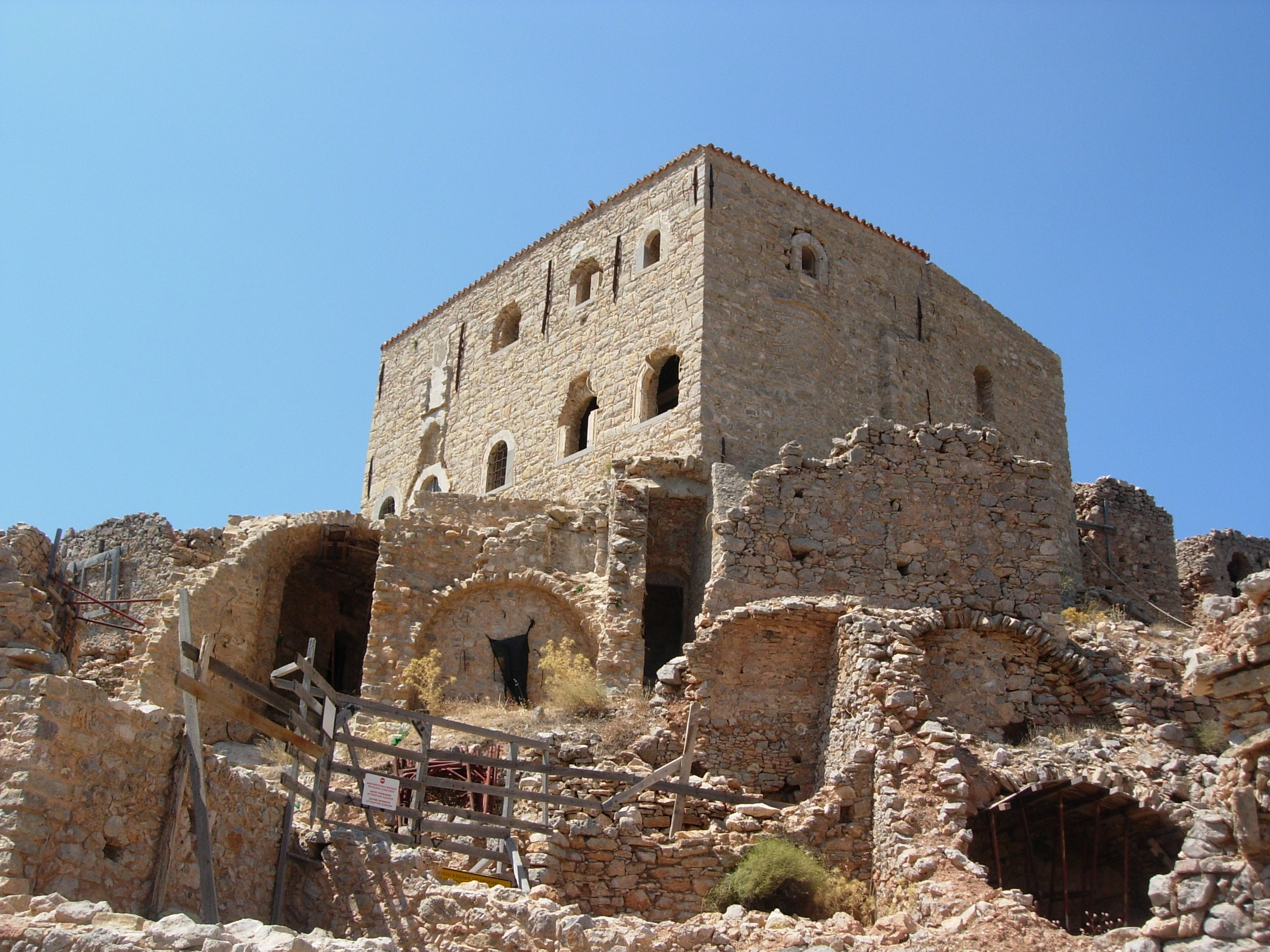
Building in the castle of Anavatos

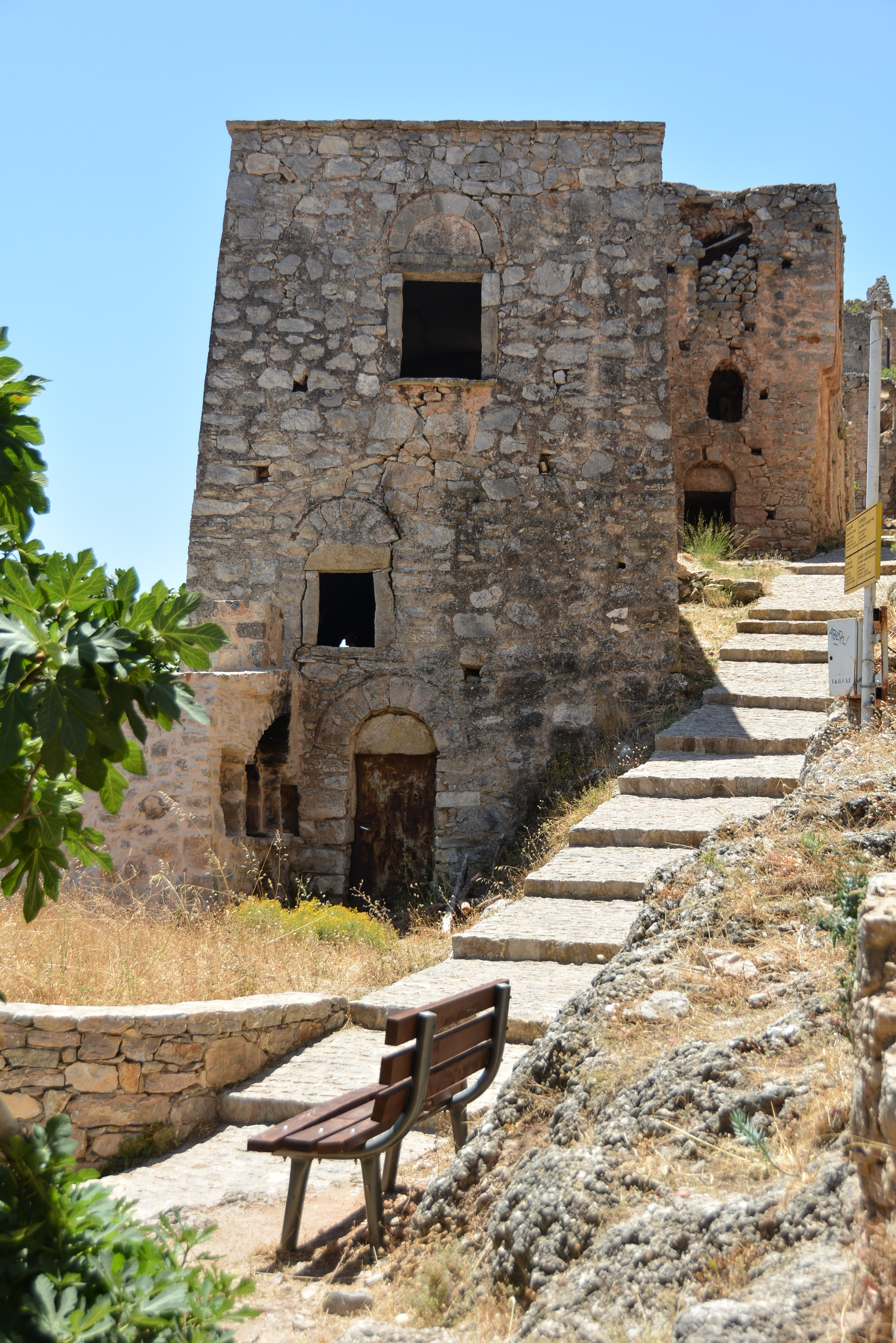
Road in Anavatos

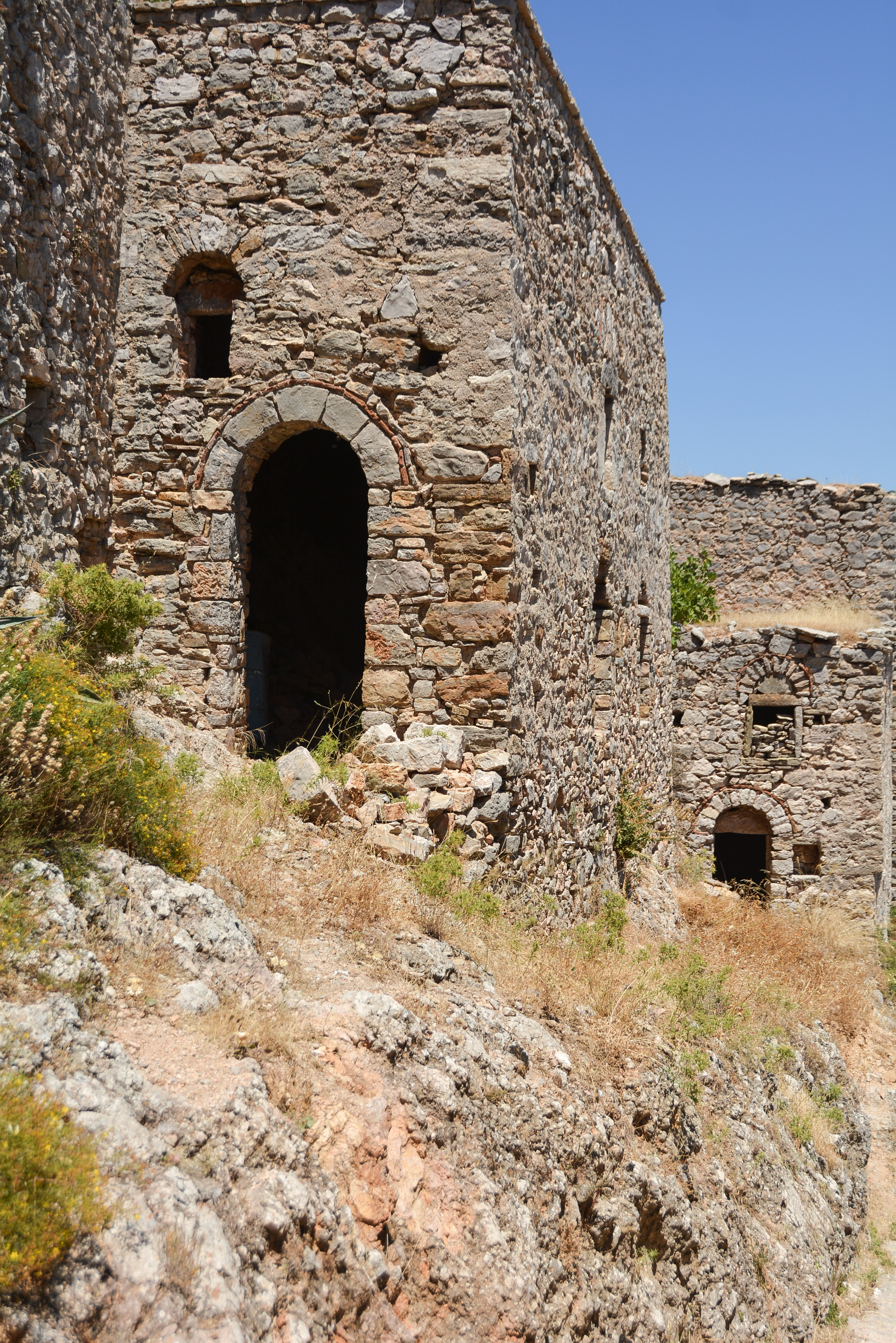
Abandoned houses in Anavatos

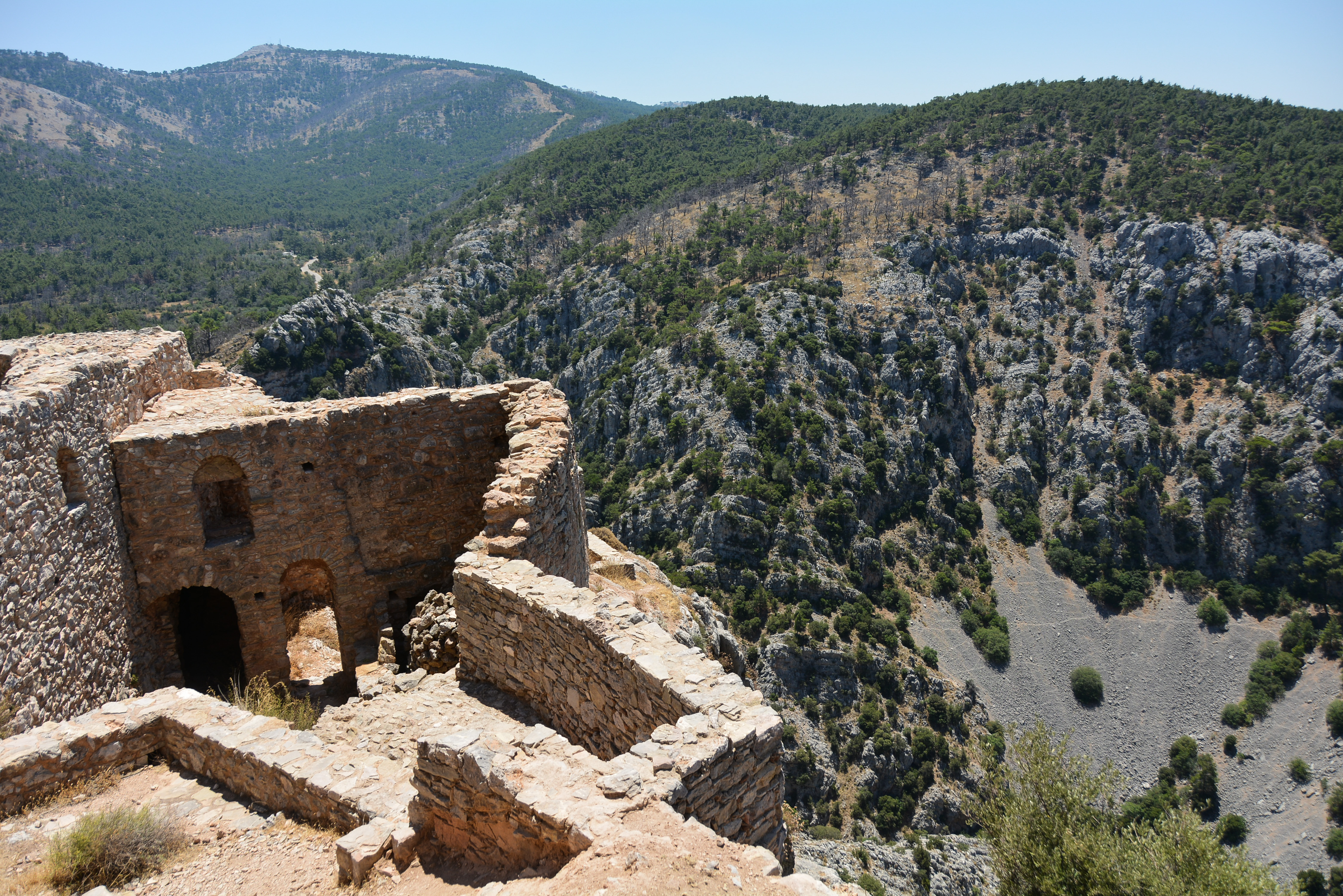
View from Anavatos

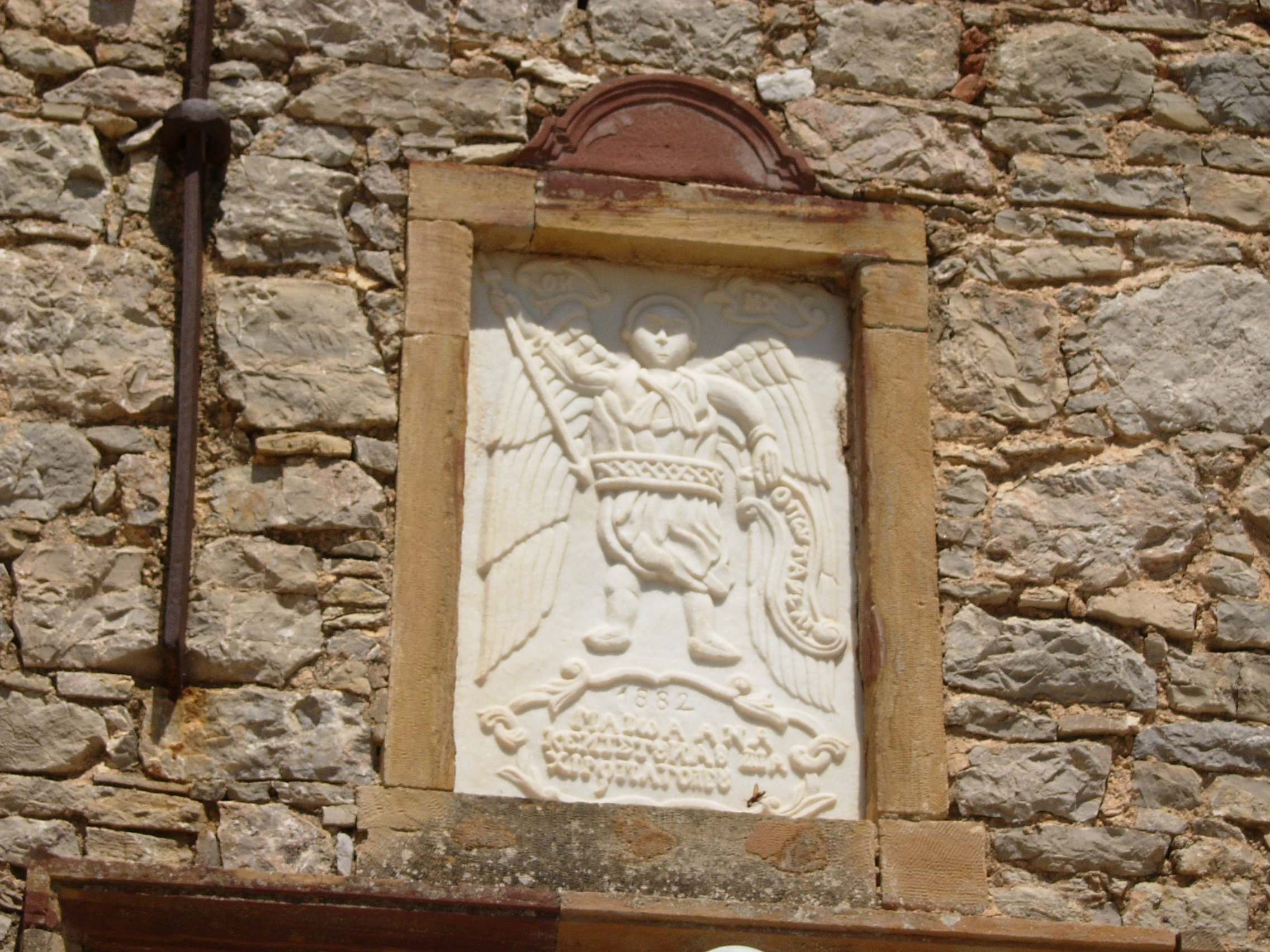
Relief in the temple of Taxiarches

== Sources ==
- Ανάβατος
