= Kardamyla =

Village in Chios, Greece

Kardamyla Καρδάμυλα
- Municipal unit
- Location within the regional unit

- Location within Greece
- Coordinates: 38°32′N 26°05′E
- Country: Greece
- Administrative region: North Aegean
- Regional unit: Chios
- Municipality: Chios

Area
  - Municipal unit: 182.5 km^{2} (70.5 sq mi)

Population (2021)
  - Municipal unit: 1,897
  - Municipal unit density: 10.39/km^{2} (26.92/sq mi)
  - Community: 1,526
- Time zone: UTC+2 (EET)
  - Summer (DST): UTC+3 (EEST)
- Postal code: 82300
- Vehicle registration: ΧΙ

Kardamyla (Greek: Καρδάμυλα) is a village and a former municipality on the island of Chios, North Aegean, Greece. Since the 2011 local government reform it is part of the municipality Chios, of which it is a municipal unit.

It is located in the northeastern corner of the island, opposite the island of Oinousses to the east. It has a land area of 182.480 km². It had a population of 1,897 in 2021. Kardamyla, the seat of the former municipality, is located on the coast of a small bay. The homes, shops and plateia of the village are on one side of the bay facing Agios Markos and cliffs which are located on the opposite side of the bay. On clear days, the island of Lesbos can be seen in the distance beyond the bay enclosure. It is a short boat ride from the neighbouring island of Oinousses. Both Oinousses and Kardamyla are known as the home villages of Greek ship-owners. The largest town in the municipal unit is Mármaron, part of the community of Kardamyla.

== Tourism ==
Sights in the village include "The V", a large white V painted on the cliffs facing the village. It was created after World War II to celebrate the victory of the Allies, and is kept painted white every year since. Kardamylitians are proud of it and many take on the challenge of cliff-climbing to it.
