= Chios (regional unit) =

Chios Περιφερειακή ενότητα Λέσβου
- Regional unit
- Municipalities of Chios

- Chios within Greece

- Location within Greece
- Coordinates: 38°25′N 26°0′E
- Country: Greece
- Administrative region: North Aegean
- Seat: Chios (town)

Area
  - Total: 904 km^{2} (349 sq mi)

Population (2021)
  - Total: 51,692
  - Density: 57.2/km^{2} (148/sq mi)
- Time zone: UTC+2 (EET)
  - Summer (DST): UTC+3 (EEST)
- Postal code: 82x xx
- Area code: 227x0
- Vehicle registration: ΧΙ
- Website: www.chios.gr

Chios (Greek: Περιφερειακή ενότητα Χίου, Greek pronunciation: [periferi.aˈci eˈnotita ˈçi.u]) is one of the regional units of Greece. It is part of the region of North Aegean. The capital of the regional unit is the town of Chios. The regional unit consists of the islands of Chios, Psara, Oinousses and some smaller uninhabited islands (including Antipsara), all in the Aegean Sea.

== Administration ==
The regional unit Chios is subdivided into 3 municipalities. These are (number as in the map in the infobox):

- Chios (1)
- Oinousses (2)
- Psara (3)

=== Prefecture ===
As a part of the 2011 Kallikratis government reform, the regional unit Chios was created out of the former prefecture Chios (Greek: Νομός Χὶου). The prefecture had the same territory as the present regional unit. At the same time, the municipalities were reorganised, according to the table below.

New municipality	Old municipalities	Seat
Chios	Chios (town)	Chios (town)
Chios	Agios Minas	Chios (town)
Chios	Amani	Chios (town)
Chios	Ionia	Chios (town)
Chios	Kampochora	Chios (town)
Chios	Kardamyla	Chios (town)
Chios	Mastichochoria	Chios (town)
Chios	Omiroupoli	Chios (town)
Oinousses	Oinousses	Oinousses
Psara	Psara	Psara

== See also ==
- List of settlements in the Chios regional unit
