= Nobility of Chios =

Hereditary aristocracy of the island of Chios

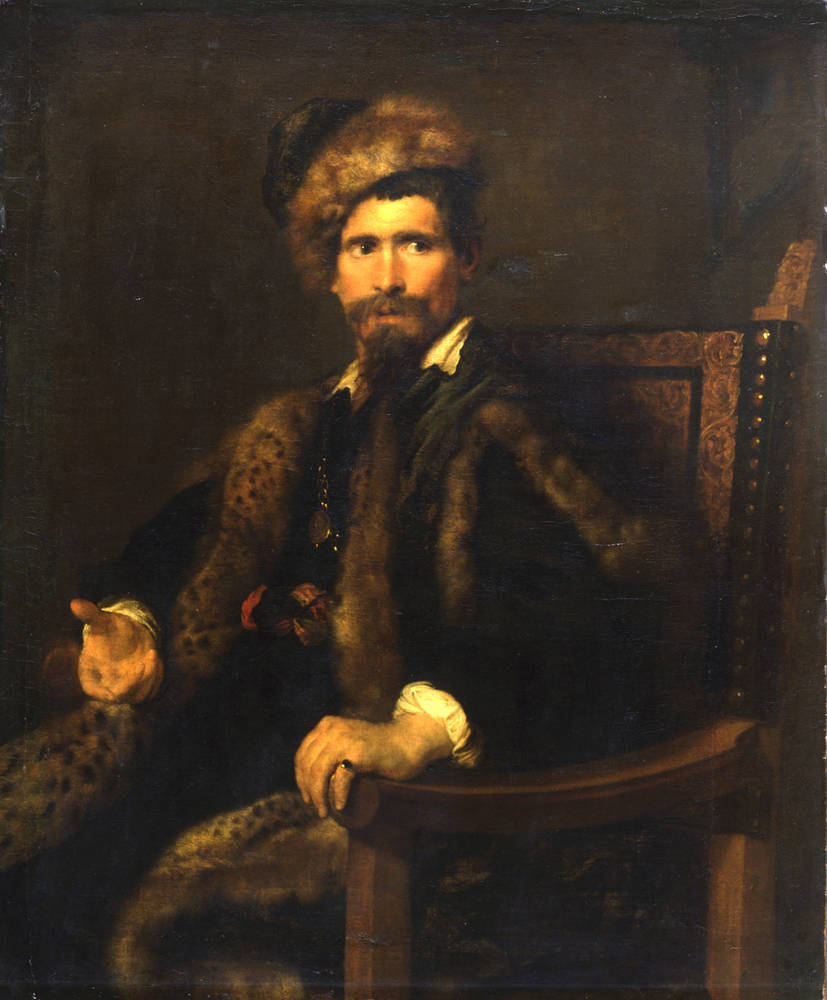
"Portrait of a gentleman in a fur coat" (Prince Rodocanachi-Giustiniani of Chios), Van Dyck c. 1628-32

The Nobility of Chios was a hereditary aristocratic class on the Greek island of Chios that flourished from the Byzantine period until the 20th century. Unique within the Eastern Mediterranean, the class was a distinct corporate entity formed by the fusion of indigenous Byzantine archons and the feudal lords who governed the island during the Genoese occupation (1346–1566).

Unlike the ephemeral "notables" (kodjabashis) in other regions of the Ottoman Empire—who, while powerful, did not constitute an aristocracy in the European feudal sense—the Chian nobility maintained a continuous, strictly endogamous caste structure recorded in the Libro d'Oro of Chios (Book of Gold) and protected by international treaties. Legally defined as Chrysobullati ("Holders of Golden Bulls"), this class enjoyed a semi-autonomous status, retaining feudal privileges—such as the right to bear arms and collect taxes—that were recognized by the Genoese authorities and subsequently tolerated by the Ottoman sultans. Beyond their local autonomy, their status as a hereditary aristocracy was formally recognized by foreign powers across centuries, explicitly documented through Papal wills, Italian legal protections, and 19th-century diplomatic dispatches from the British, French, and Russian courts.

Following the destruction of their physical base during the Massacre of Chios in 1822, surviving families dispersed to Western Europe. In the diaspora, they transformed from a landed aristocracy into a powerful commercial network that dominated global trade throughout the 19th and into the 20th centuries; especially the grain and cotton trade in London, Marseille, and Alexandria.

== Origins and legal status ==
=== Byzantine roots ===
The nobility of Chios traced its origins to the Byzantine period, asserting descent from the "greatest families of Byzantium" who established themselves on the island during the Komnenian and Palaiologan eras. By the 14th century, this class of landed archontes (lords) dominated the island's administration, holding high imperial offices and governing as virtual autocrats in the name of the Emperor.

Prominent figures from this period included Leon Kalothetos, the governor of the island and a close associate of Emperor John VI Kantakouzenos, who held the governorship until 1340. He was succeeded by Kaloyannis Zyvos (or Ziffo), who led the island's defense during the early stages of the Genoese encroachment. The status of these families was confirmed by the possession of "Golden Bulls" (chrysobulls)—imperial charters that granted them tax exemptions and vast estates in the Kampos. Families such as the Agelasto appeared in records as early as the 9th century, serving as imperial notaries and protospathaires.

=== First Genoese period (1304–1329) ===
The distinct character of the Chian aristocracy began to take shape during the short-lived Lordship of Chios established by the famous Genoese admiral Benedetto I Zaccaria in 1304. Justifying his seizure of the island as a necessary protection against Turkish piracy, Zaccaria established a feudal dominion that relied heavily on the cooperation of the local landed gentry. Unlike typical colonial conquests, the Zaccaria rule was legitimized through diplomatic ties to the Byzantine court; Benedetto's son, Benedetto II Paleologo-Zaccaria, was named for his mother's imperial house.

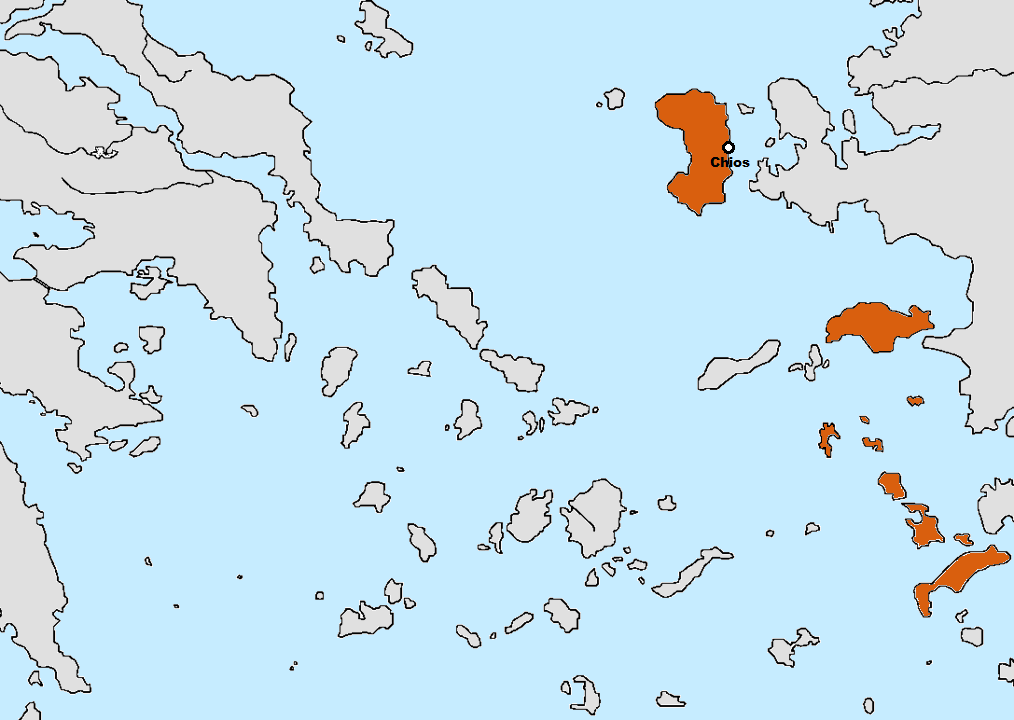
The Lordship of Chios under Martino Zaccaria

During this period, the indigenous archons successfully negotiated the preservation of their property rights and religious freedom. The Zaccaria lords, requiring local stability to maximize the profits of the mastic trade, formalized the privileges of the Greek nobility, allowing them to retain their estates in the Kampos while integrating them into a Western feudal hierarchy.

This era concluded in 1329 when the local aristocracy, led by the prominent archon Leo Kalothetos, colluded with Emperor Andronikos III Palaiologos to overthrow Martino Zaccaria and restore Byzantine rule. The swift restoration of imperial authority, facilitated by the local elite, cemented the nobility's reputation as the political brokers of the island—a power base they would retain when the Genoese returned permanently in 1346.

=== Second Genoese period (1346–1566) ===
When Genoese rule was re-established in 1346, the status of the nobility was formally codified in international law. The surrender of the island was negotiated not as a conquest of a common population, but as a treaty between peers: the Genoese admiral Simone Vignoso and the ruling archontes. The Treaty of 1346 was signed by the representatives of the mostly Genoese Chian aristocracy, including the Governor Kaloyannis Zyvos, the Great Falconer Argenti, the Grand Sakellarios Michael Coressi, the Protocomes Damalà, and the Syndic Georgio Agelasto.

Crucially, the treaty contained specific clauses protecting the indigenous nobility. Clause 5 of the capitulation explicitly "safeguarded the privileges and possessions... which this class acquired from purchase, inheritance or grants from the Byzantine Emperors with chrysobulls."

The island was subsequently governed by a chartered company known as the Maona of Chios and Phocaea (Maona di Chio e di Focea), which established a unique social stratification. The ruling class was not a monolithic entity but was divided into distinct tiers based on their relationship to the Maona corporation:

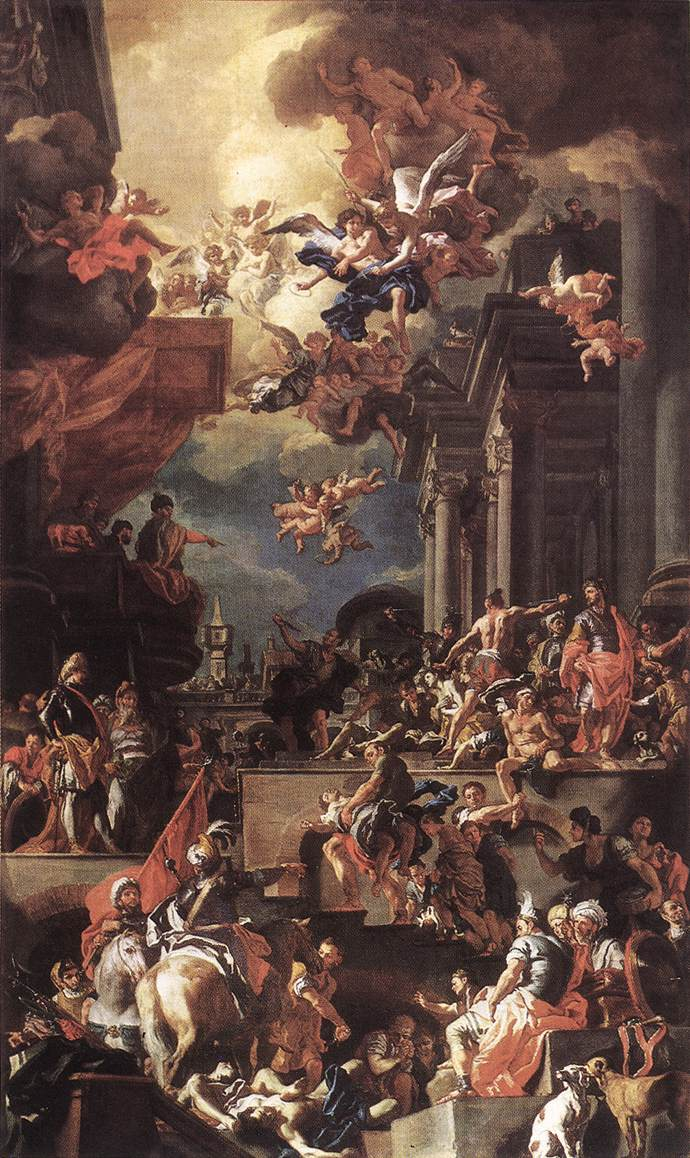
The Massacre of the Giustiniani at Chios by Francesco Solimena

- The Maonesi (Giustiniani): At the top of the hierarchy were the shareholders of the Maona, who adopted the collective surname Giustiniani and held exclusive political and administrative power.
- The Burghers (Latin Nobility): Below the shareholders but socially superior to the local population was the class of "Burghers" (Burgenses). This group consisted of Genoese aristocratic families (such as the Grimaldi and Ralli families) and families of Italian origin (such as the Argenti and Coressi families) who possessed feudal estates and noble status but were excluded from the administration of the Maona. While technically classified as "Latin Bourgeoisie" due to their exclusion from the Maona's dividends, they functioned socially as a high aristocracy, maintaining fortified towers and feudal privileges.
- The Greek Nobility: The indigenous Byzantine archontes (such as the Petrocochino, Rodocanachi, and Agelasto) formed the third tier. Over time, the strict barrier between the Latin and Greek nobilities eroded. The two groups intermarried frequently, fused their heraldic traditions, and by the end of the Genoese period, had mostly coalesced into a single class that would later be inscribed in the Libro d'Oro (Book of Gold).

=== Ottoman era (1566–1822) ===
After the Ottoman conquest in 1566, the nobility retained a significant degree of autonomy. The island was granted a privileged status, functioning as a "Little Genoa" within the Ottoman Empire. Uniquely, the nobility possessed the right to bypass the local Ottoman Governor (Pasha) entirely; they maintained permanent diplomatic representatives (Kapukehayas) in Constantinople who dealt directly with the Grand Vizier, effectively rendering the local Ottoman administration a figurehead. The administration was entrusted to the Demogerontia (Council of Elders), a body elected exclusively from the noble families of the Libro d'Oro, which managed the island's fiscal and legal affairs with a "prudent and fair administration" that fostered general prosperity.

While the majority of the class eventually assimilated into the Greek Orthodox faith, a distinct 'Latin' segment persisted, preserving the community's Genoese heritage. A census conducted in 1686 by the Abbot de Burgo recorded the specific Catholic families remaining on the island; of the dozens listed, eight specific houses—Castelli, Coressi, Damalà, Grimaldi, Maximo, Ralli, Salvago, and Vlasto—successfully maintained their identity and status to be codified among the final thirty-seven families of the Libro d'Oro. Members of the nobility were distinguished by the title "Misé" (derived from Messire), which was used in legal documents and public discourse to denote their rank.

Beyond local autonomy, the noble status of the Chian ruling class was explicitly recognized by foreign powers and the Vatican during the Ottoman era. In his 17th-century will, the Vatican librarian Leo Allatius established a Roman educational foundation for Chiot youths, legally mandating that candidates be selected exclusively by the Gentilhuomini del Governo di Scio (Gentlemen of the Government of Chios), providing formal Papal acknowledgment of the island's governing aristocracy.

Similarly, foreign diplomats routinely documented the class's status. Following the brief Venetian capture of Chios in 1694, the Venetian Captain General Antonio Zeno sent an official dispatch to the Senate detailing the island's "very ancient and very noble Greek families." French ambassadors, such as the Marquis de Nointel in 1673, formally recorded the local gentilshommes and noted their European-style social life.

The legal status of the Chiot nobility was actively defended in Italy; when a resident of Padua fraudulently attempted to pass himself off as a noble of Chios, local authorities prosecuted and publicly exposed him in 1694–1695.

== Economic basis ==
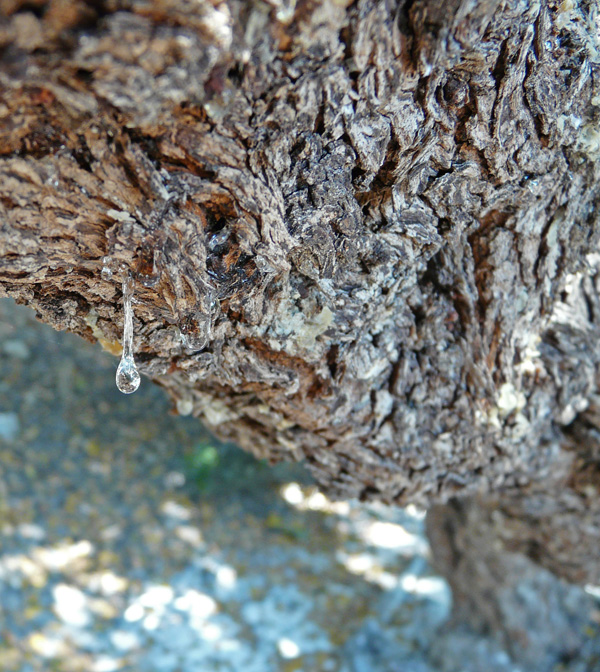
A single drop of mastic hangs from the underside of this branch on a mastic tree.

While the cultivation of mastic remained a state monopoly (controlled first by the Maona and then by the sultan's mother, the Valide Sultan), the private wealth of the nobility was largely built on the silk industry. By the Ottoman period, the island hosted over 1,200 looms, producing high-quality silks and brocades that were exported across the Mediterranean. This economic foundation allowed the Chian nobility to maintain a continuity of wealth and status that was rare among the Greek elites of the era, many of whom rose and fell within a few generations.

== Customs and privileges ==
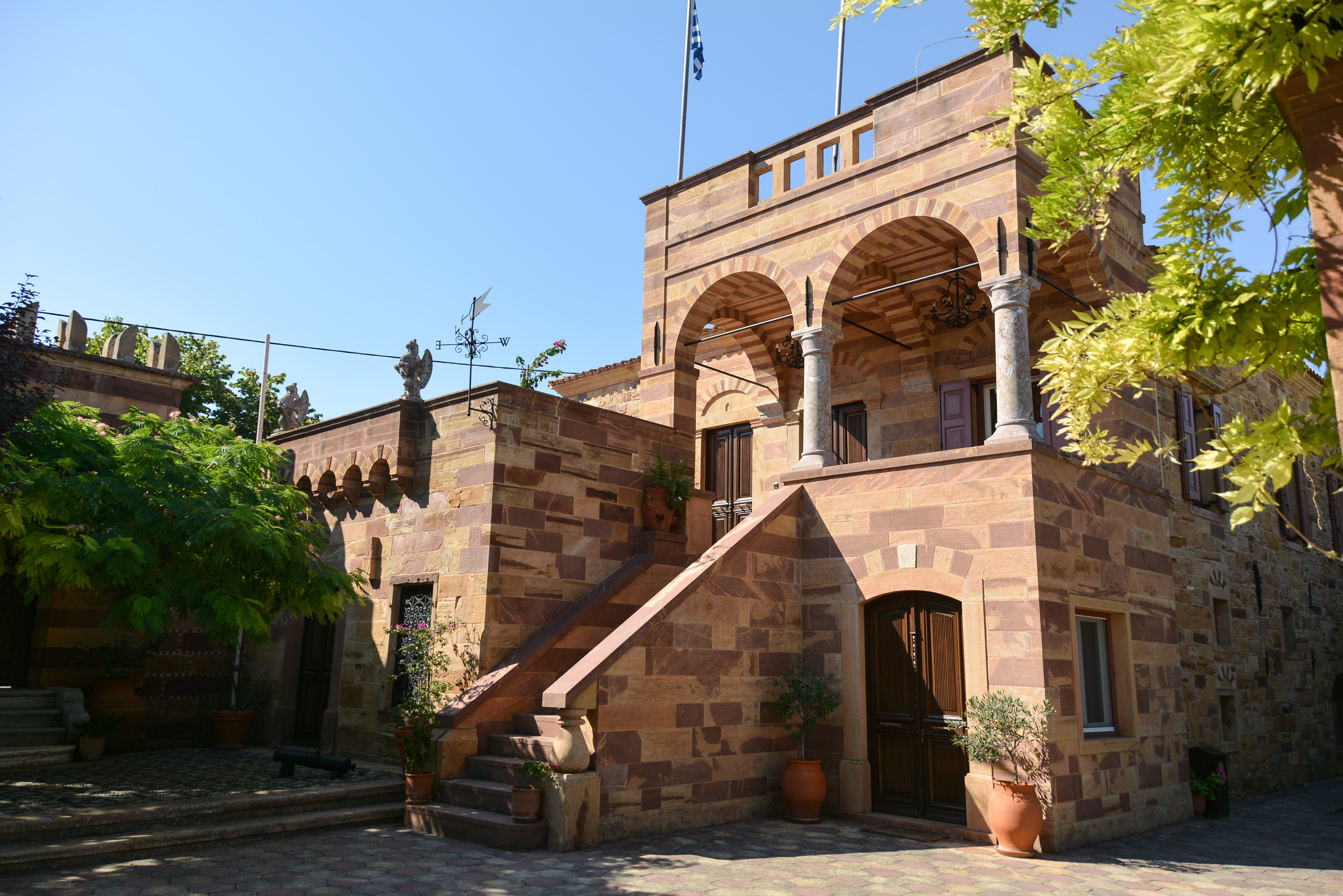
Argenti estate in the Kampos

The nobility maintained distinct social customs to differentiate themselves from the bourgeoisie and peasantry.

- Residence: In the city, they lived in the fortified citadel (Castro), leading to the designation "Castrini". In the countryside, they resided in the Kampos, an area of fortified estates (pyrgoi) and citrus orchards. The Chian estates were held in Fee Simple (absolute freehold), a rare deviation from Ottoman land law that protected their property from arbitrary confiscation.

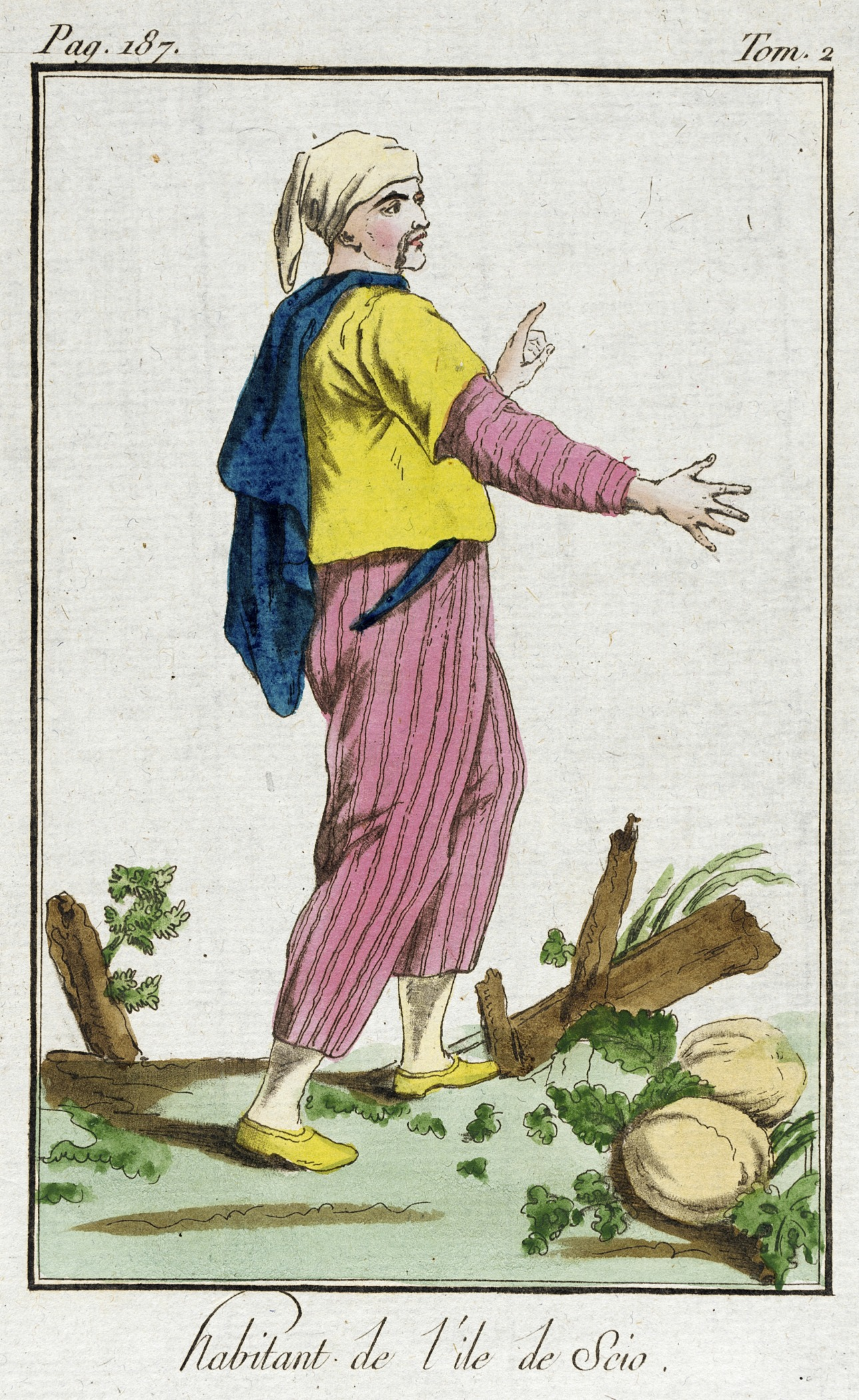
A nobleman c. 1700

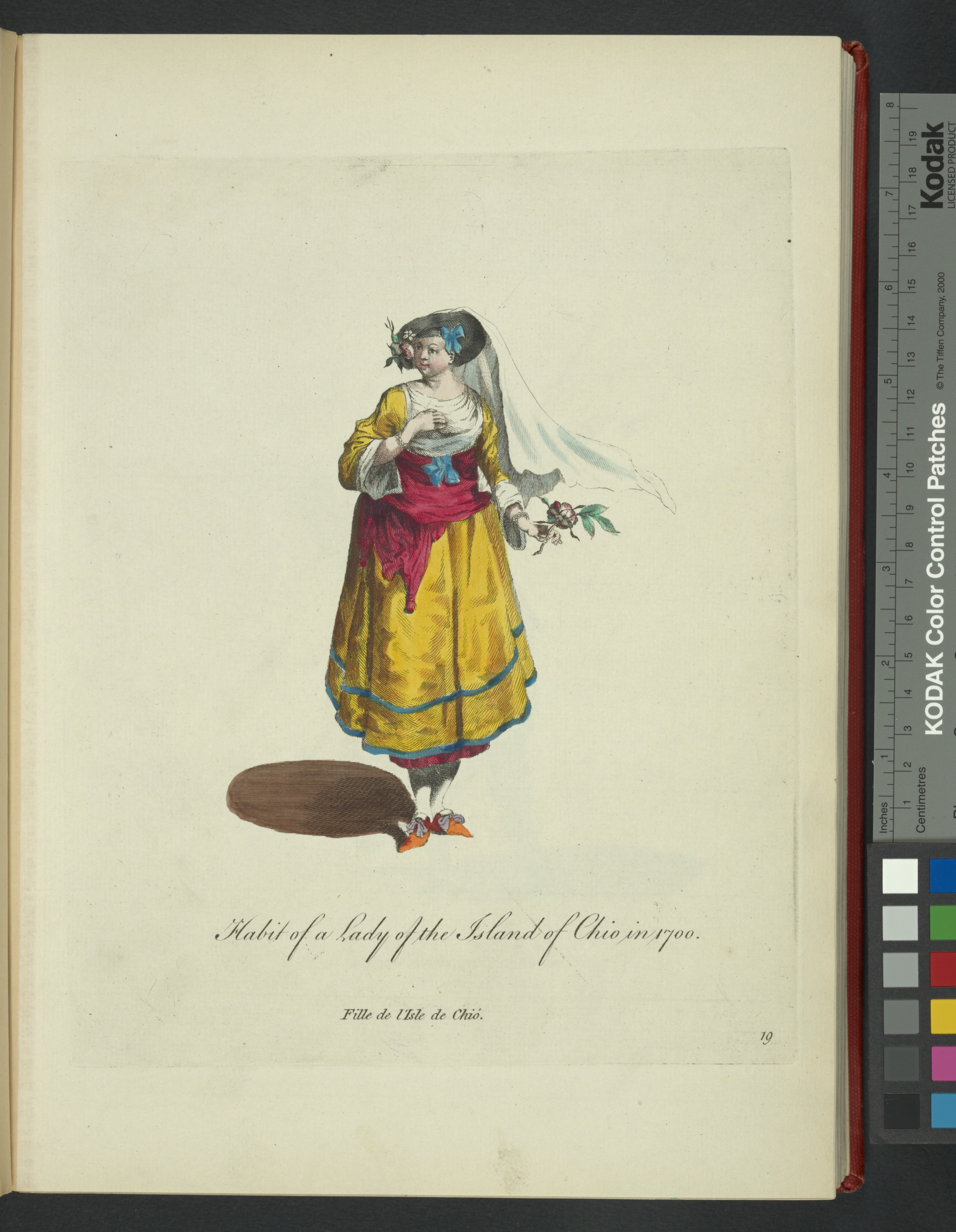
A noblewoman c. 1700

- Dress and Arms: Social distinction was enforced through strict sumptuary laws. Nobles possessed the "Right of the Sword"—the privilege to carry weapons in public, which was strictly forbidden to the subject population. They also held the exclusive right to wear yellow Morocco shoes, a yellow cape, and the kalpak (a noble fur headdress).
- Endogamy: The families practiced strict endogamy, rarely marrying outside their social class.
- Nobility of the Ledger: Unlike the aristocracies of Western Europe, where engagement in trade could lead to a loss of status (dérogeance), the Chian nobility viewed commerce as a noble duty. This custom, known as the "Nobility of the Ledger", allowed families to accumulate significant capital while retaining their feudal rank.
- Heraldic Monopoly: The class enforced a strict state-sanctioned monopoly on heraldry, where the usurpation of a coat of arms was considered a capital offense.

== Social structure and hierarchy ==
The Chian nobility was strictly stratified and statistically hyper-exclusive. At its height, the registered nobility comprised only thirty-seven families out of a population of approximately 120,000—a ratio of 1:3,200. By comparison, this made the Chian nobility significantly more exclusive than the contemporary aristocracies of Venice (1:700) or pre-revolutionary France (1:50).

The internal structure of the class demonstrated a remarkable continuity of form despite a shift in the criteria for precedence. Under the Genoese Maona of Chios and Phocaea, the aristocracy was stratified into three distinct tiers defined by political rights: the Maonesi (shareholders), the Burghers (Latin feudalists), and the Greek Archons. Following the Ottoman conquest in 1566, this tripartite structure was preserved but redefined based on religious assimilation and lineage. By the 18th century, the families were organized into a hierarchy of Byzantine Greek preference, divided into three tiers: the Pentada (The Five), the Dodekada (The Twelve), and the Eikosada (The Twenty).

A comparison of the leadership across these eras reveals the dramatic attrition of the Latin element. A census of the Genoese nobility on the island conducted in 1686 by the Abbot Giovanni Battista de Burgo recorded approximately eighty Catholic noble families, including branches of the Doria, Spinola, and Timoni. However, when the corporate structure of the Libro d'Oro finally crystallized and closed its ranks to new admittance, the vast majority of these lines had either emigrated or lost their standing.

Only eight of the eighty families recorded in 1686 successfully maintained their presence on Chios, their Genoese identity, and the Catholic faith with sufficient prominence to secure induction into the final thirty-seven families.

Consequently, the hierarchy shifted from a Latin-dominated administration to one defined by Orthodox Byzantine lineage:

- The Evolution of the Pentada: The "Old Pentada" of 1346 was dominated by families of Western origin, such as the Coressi and Damalà. By the 18th century, the new Pentada consisted almost exclusively of families of Byzantine origin, including the Mavrogordato, Petrocochino, and Schilizzi. The Argenti remained the only family to maintain its position in the highest tier from the Genoese conquest to the 20th century, having fully assimilated into the Greek Orthodox tradition.
- The Latin Demotion of Precedence: The noble houses that strictly maintained their Roman Catholic identity into the Ottoman era were largely concentrated in the lower tiers. Of the eight Latin lineages surviving from the 1686 census to the final codified Libro d'Oro, five—including the Castelli, Damalà, Maximo, Salvago, and Vlasto—were inducted into the third tier (Eikosada). The only Catholic families to appear in the second tier (Dodekada) were the Coressi, the Grimaldi, and the Ralli.

=== The Pentada (The Five) ===
The highest tier, comprising the dynasties that had fully assimilated into the Orthodox tradition and held the greatest commercial power. It consisted of four families of Byzantine origin and the Argenti, the sole surviving house of the Genoese conquest period to retain this rank.

The Pentada
| Family | Origin | Notable History & Status |
|---|---|---|
| Argenti | Italian | Distinct branch of the Italian Arienti family. Signatories of the 1346 Treaty with Genoa; inscribed in the Golden Book of Genoa in 1528. Produced saints (St. André Argenti) and martyrs of the Greek War of Independence. |
| Mavrogordato | Byzantine | Derived from the imperial court; name implies "Black Cord". Rose to prominence as Phanariotes; produced Hospodars (Princes) of Moldavia and Wallachia, including Alexander Mavrocordatos. |
| Petrocochino | Byzantine | First mentioned in Constantinople in 1397; established in Chio by the 15th century. Held the office of Protendikos (Defensor) of the island. Inscribed in the Golden Book of Genoa. |
| Rodocanachi | Byzantine | Claimed descent from the imperial Doucas family. Held vast estates in the 12th century; listed in the Golden Book of Genoa (1583). Notable for their later commercial empire in Livorno and Marseille. |
| Schilizzi | Byzantine | Originally from the Theme of the Thracesians; members held court titles like Curopalates and Drungary. Zannis Schilizzi was a key representative to the Sublime Porte in the 16th century. |

=== The Dodekada (The Twelve) ===
The second tier, representing a balance between the old Byzantine aristocracy (such as the Agelasto and Galati) and the few prominent families of Latin origin (such as the Grimaldi and Ralli) who managed to be placed in this tier despite the general decline of the Catholic element.

The Dodekada
| Family | Origin | Notable History & Status |
|---|---|---|
| Agelasto | Byzantine | Documented as imperial notaries in the 9th century and protospathaires in the 10th. Georges Agelasto was a syndic who signed the capitulation treaty with Genoa in 1346. |
| Calvocoressi | Chian / Genoese | A branch of the Coressi family that joined the Genoese albergo of the Calvi in 1538, adopting the name Calvo-Coressi. Produced distinguished scholars and physicians. |
| Condostavlo | Byzantine | Name derives from the military rank of Megas Konostaulos (Grand Constable). A branch (Calaroni) were noted hagiographers; another branch settled in Venice and Andros. |
| Coressi | Italian | Michel Coressi, a Megas Sakellarios, signed the 1346 Treaty. Inscribed in the Golden Book of Genoa; members served as Consuls of Venice in Chios. |
| Galati | Byzantine | Descended from the Galaton family of Constantinople (10th century). Served as ambassadors for the Chian community to the Ottoman court in the 16th century. |
| Grimaldi | Genoese | Branch of the House of Grimaldi. Remained in Chios after the Ottoman conquest, with many members converting to Orthodoxy while others remained Catholic. |
| Negroponte | Venetian / Genoese | Originated from the Zorzi family of Venice who became lords of Euboea (Negroponte). Lost their fiefs to the Turks and settled in Chios, intermarrying with the Genoese Giustiniani. |
| Prassacachi | Genoese / Ligurian | Likely derived from the noble Prassacordi family. Established in Chios by the 14th century. Founders of the Church of Panaghia Kalamoti. |
| Ralli | Genoese | Descended from the Norman-Byzantine house of Raoul (Ralles). Prominent in the 19th century as founders of the major trading house Ralli Brothers. |
| Scaramanga | Byzantine | Old Byzantine family; name appears in 16th-century Chian records. Notable for their role in the 1822 diaspora and subsequent commercial success in Russia and London. |
| Sevastopoulo | Byzantine | Name means "Son of the Sebastos" (an imperial title). Fled to Chios from the Peloponnese or Constantinople. Active in 19th-century diplomacy. |
| Vouro | Byzantine / Cretan | Likely originated from Rethymno, Crete. Georges Vouros was a key envoy to Sultan Selim II in 1567, securing privileges for the island. |

=== The Eikosada (The Twenty) ===
The third tier, comprising families of equal legal standing but lower political precedence. Notably, this tier contains the majority of the houses that retained a distinct Roman Catholic identity into the Ottoman era (such as the Castelli and Damalà), alongside other families of more recent arrival.

The Eikosada
| Family | Origin | Notable History & Status |
|---|---|---|
| Avierino | Byzantine | Fled to Lesbos then Chios (15th c.). A branch emigrated to Russia where they were recognized as hereditary nobility; Antoine Avierino attended the Tsarskoye Selo Lyceum. |
| Calouta | Byzantine | Originally Caloeidas. Michel Calouta was granted Genoese citizenship by Doge Battista Fregoso in 1479. |
| Carali | Byzantine | Descendants of the Coralli family. Notable patrons of letters in the 18th century; Michel Carali financed numerous publications. |
| Casanova | Genoese | Branch of the Fieschi family of Genoa. Converted to Orthodoxy in 1696 to avoid Ottoman persecution of Catholics. |
| Castelli | Genoese | Branch of the Giustiniani albergo. Maintained the Catholic faith longer than most; some branches later converted to Orthodoxy. |
| Chryssoveloni | Byzantine | Name appears in documents from the 16th century. Founded a major banking house in the 19th century; notable participation in the Greek War of Independence. |
| Damalà | Genoese | Descended from the Zaccaria Lords of Chios and Barons of Damala in Achaea. Signed the 1346 Treaty, then absent from 1346–1566. Converted to Orthodoxy in the early 19th century to avoid Ottoman persecution of Catholics. |
| Franghiadi | Peloponnesian? | Name implies Frankish origin or association. Metropolitan Platon Franghiadi was hanged by the Turks in 1822. |
| Maximo | Byzantine / Italian | Linked to the Massimo family of Rome. Listed in the Golden Book of Genoa. Remained partly Catholic. |
| Paspati | Byzantine | Originally from Caramania; name "Paspati" found in Byzantine records. Alexandre Paspati was a noted Byzantine scholar and linguist. |
| Paterii | Genoese / Ligurian | Noble family from Savona; inscribed in the Golden Book of Genoa. Members of the Maona of Chios and Phocaea. |
| Roïdi | Athenian | One of the oldest noble families of Athens. A branch settled in Chios in the 17th century; produced the famous author Emmanuel Rhoides. |
| Salvago | Genoese | Originating from Lombardy; inscribed in the Golden Book of Genoa. Prominent in the Greek community of Alexandria in the 19th century. |
| Scanavi | Byzantine? | First appears in Chios in 1607. Rose to great wealth as bankers in Constantinople; Nicholas Scanavi was a key financier of the island's defense. |
| Sechiari | Italian / Modenese | Originally from Modena. First mentioned in Chios in the 17th century; established major trading houses in London and Marseille. Historians such as Philip Argenti suggest they descend from the Genoese Zaccaria family. |
| Sgouta | Byzantine | Old Byzantine family; first mention in Chios in 1572. Included physicians and scholars educated at the University of Padua. |
| Vlasto | Cretan / Byzantine | Ancient noble family from Crete; leaders of the 1205 revolt against Venice. Settled in Chios in the 17th century; inscribed in the Golden Book of Genoa. |
| Ziffo (Zyvos) | Byzantine | From Rhodes; settled in Genoa in the 12th century, then Chios. Jean Zyvos was the military governor of Chios who signed the capitulation to Genoa in 1346. |
| Zizinia | Unknown | Arrived in Chios in the 17th century. Etienne Zizinia became a Count and was prominent in Egypt (Zizinia district in Alexandria). |
| Zygomala | Byzantine / Argive | Originated from Argos; settled in Nafplio then Chios. Produced scholars and Grand Logothetes of the Patriarchate. |

== The Exodus of 1822 ==
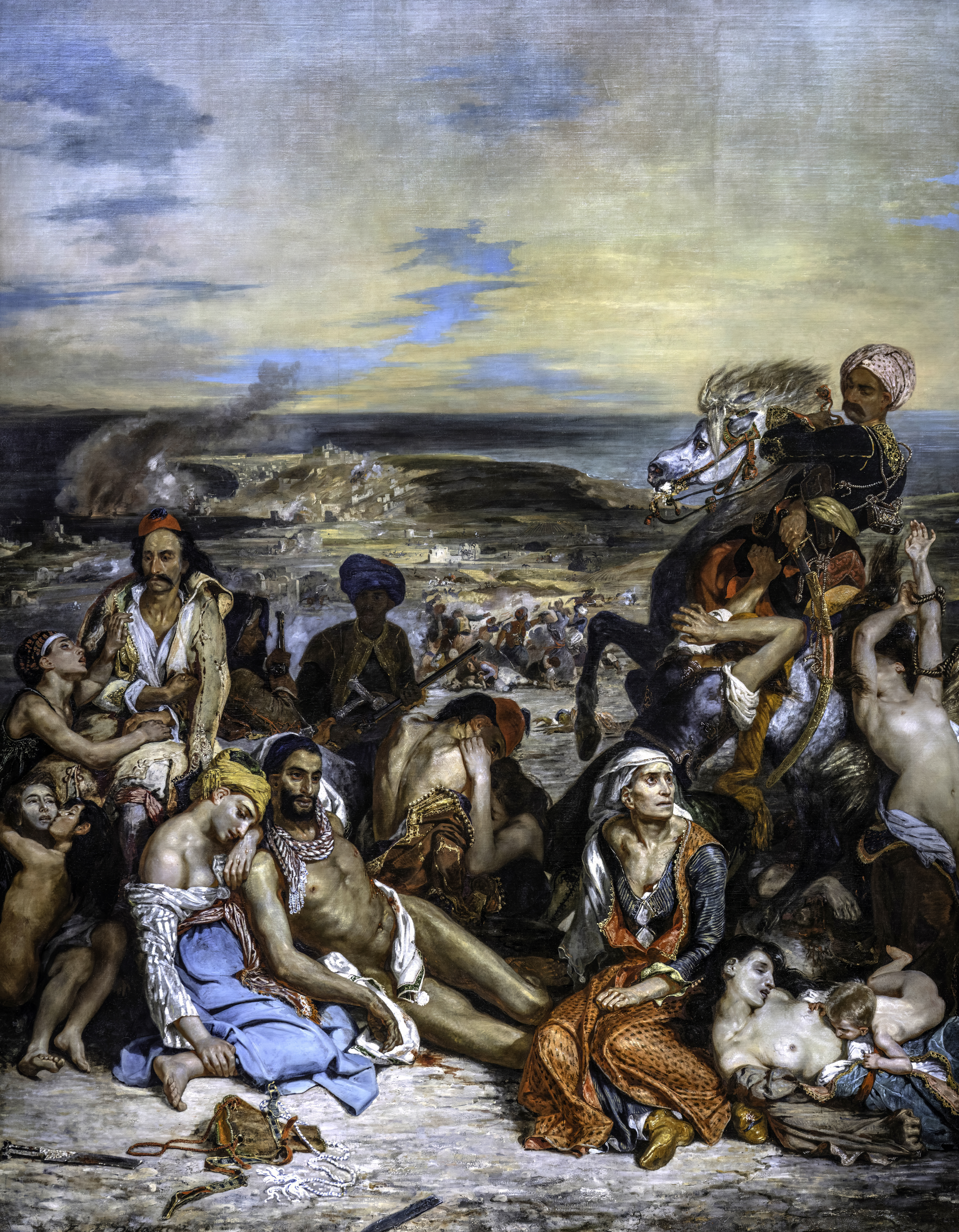
The Massacre at Chios by Eugène Delacroix. This, and the works of Lord Byron, did much to draw the attention of mainland Europe to the catastrophe that had taken place in Chios (1824, oil on canvas, 419 cm × 354 cm (165 in × 139 in), Musée du Louvre, Paris).

The Massacre of Chios in 1822 marked the destruction of the nobility's physical base on the island. Following the Ottoman reprisal for the Greek War of Independence, approximately eighty heads of the noble families—including the Metropolitan Platon Franghiadi and members of the Ralli, Schilizzi, and Scanavi families—were taken as hostages and hanged in the main square of Vounaki. Their ancestral estates in the Kampos and their mansions in the Castro were pillaged or burned. Survivors were forced to flee, often leaving behind all possessions, to the island of Syros, where they played a key role in founding the city of Ermoupoli, and to other European centers. This event forced a cultural shift; families that had maintained dual Latin-Greek identities or Catholic affiliations (such as the Casanova) fully Hellenized their names and integrated into the Orthodox faith to survive in the post-1822 Greek world.

During the crisis, the distinct status of the Chian elite was recorded in the official state papers of foreign governments. Diplomatic dispatches from the Dutch minister Gaspar Testa, the British ambassador Lord Strangford, and the Neapolitan consul-general Antonio Girardi explicitly utilized aristocratic terminology, reporting to their respective governments in 1822 and 1824 on the fate of the "Greek lords of the island" (seigneurs grecs), the "persons of rank," and the "great families" who had been forced into exile or enslaved. French Vice-Consul Céleste Étienne David likewise officially documented the nobles familles who had resided in the Castro.

== Diaspora and legacy ==
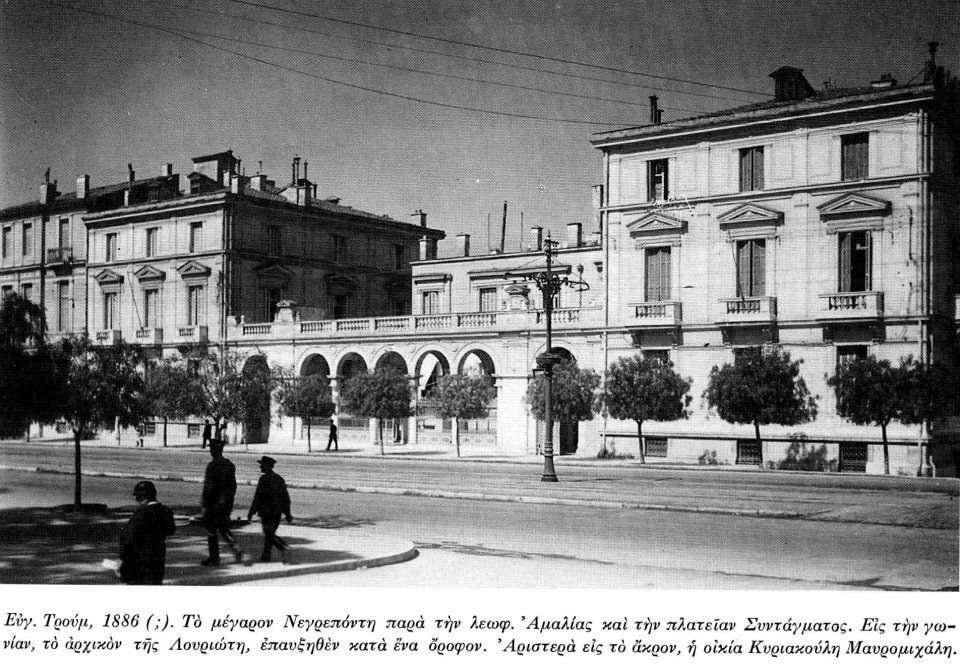
Negroponte Mansion in Athens

However, the corporate identity of the class survived in the diaspora. This network of interrelated families, sometimes referred to as the "Chiot Clan", dominated Mediterranean and global trade throughout the 19th century. In 1886, several families of the nobility—including the Agelasto, Argenti, Damalà, Galati, Mavrogordato, Petrocochino, Rodocanachi, Scaramanga, Schilizzi, Sevastopoulo, Vlasto, and Zizinia—were listed among the membership of the Baltic Exchange in London, reflecting their successful integration into the international maritime economy. The "Chiot network" had already begun to internationalize in the 18th century, establishing a presence in Smyrna, Constantinople, and Trieste.

=== Diaspora ===
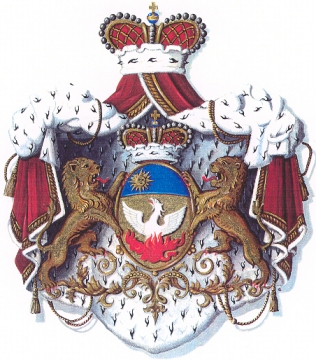
Coat of arms of the Mavrokordatos family

- London: The diaspora in London became highly influential in the financial sector. The Ralli family established Ralli Brothers, one of the most successful merchant houses of the Victorian era. Families such as the Argenti and Schilizzi also rose to prominence in the City, with members like Pandely Argenti serving as major benefactors to the Greek community.
- Marseille and France: A significant community established itself in Marseille, where the Rodocanachi, Zizinia, Scaramanga, and Damalà families became leaders in trade with the Levant.
- Russia: The Russian government recognized the noble status of Chian families. For example, Antoine Avierino was admitted to the exclusive Tsarskoye Selo Lyceum—an institution reserved for the high nobility—solely on the basis of his Chian descent. Other families, like the Mavrogordato, achieved high rank in the Imperial service, with members serving as Councilors of State and officers in the Imperial Guard.
- Austria: Several families were ennobled in the Austrian Empire. The Ralli family were created Barons, as were the Zizinia family.
- Italy: The Rodocanachi family established a commercial empire in Livorno, where they were eventually ennobled as Counts by the Kingdom of Italy. Historical recognition of Chian nobles in Italian states predated the 19th century; for instance, official documents in the state archives of Turin (Duchy of Savoy) explicitly recorded Chiot citizens with titles such as Gentillomo greco (Greek gentleman).
- Egypt: In Alexandria, families such as the Salvago, Zizinia, and Benachi played a pivotal role in the modernization of the Egyptian economy and the cotton trade. The Zizinia district in Alexandria is named after the family.

=== Legacy ===
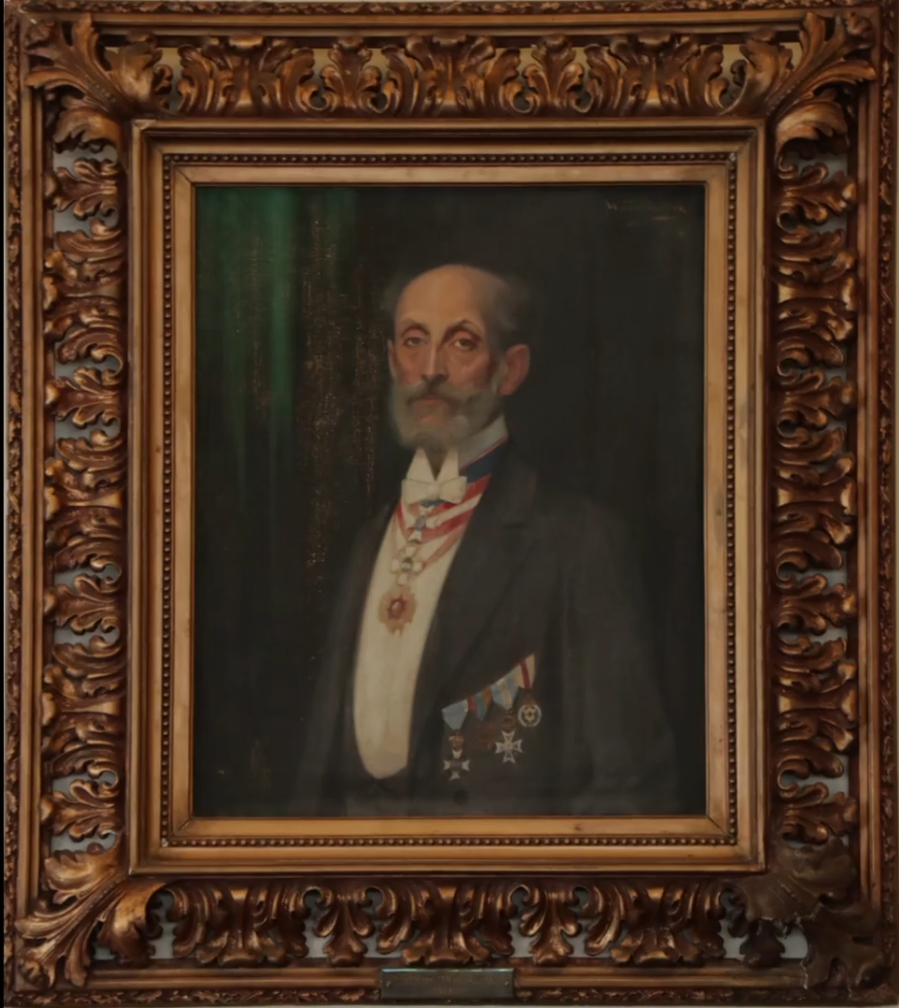
Portrait of Pavlos Damalà in white tie attire, found at the Omilos Ereton Rowing Club offices in Piraeus, Greece.

- Assimilation: Unlike other Greek diaspora groups that maintained close ties to the homeland, the Chian nobility in London and Liverpool often assimilated rapidly into the local aristocracy. Contemporary Greek observers noted with regret that by the third generation, many scions of these families had become "pseudo-English" or "pseudo-French," losing their language and distinct Orthodox identity.
- Nobility of the Ledger: In Austria and Italy, families invested heavily in land and titles rather than industrial production in Greece. The Ralli and the Rodocanachi acquired baronies and counties, building palatial residences such as the Palazzo Grassi in Venice and villas in Tuscany.
- Public Service in Greece: Some families reasserted their influence in the new Greek state through high civic office. For example, the Damalà family produced mayors of Ermoupoli, Chios, and Piraeus, and cultural benefactors who brought the first bicycles to Greece with King George I in 1869, and founded the oldest sporting institution in Greece and the Balkans with the Ereto Rowing Club in 1885.

== Restoration of 1859 ==
Despite their dispersal, the nobility maintained a strong sense of corporate identity. In 1859, the heads of thirteen surviving houses that maintained prominence returned to Chios to formally reconstitute the Cantouni, the historic noble assembly that had governed their social affairs before the massacre. This act was not merely symbolic; it was a substantive reassertion of the class's cohesion and their commitment to the island's institutions, operating "as it had been" prior to the catastrophe, lasting until the island's 1913 induction into the Kingdom of Greece. The families who signed the act of reconstitution included:

- Argenti
- Calvocoressi
- Chryssoveloni
- Damalà
- Mavrogordato
- Negroponte
- Paspati
- Petrocochino
- Ralli
- Rodocanachi
- Scanavi
- Scaramanga
- Zygomala

== Social perception and identity ==
The Chian nobility was historically the subject of distinct social perceptions within the broader Greek world, characterized by their immense wealth, insularity, and cosmopolitanism.

- The "Jewish" Analogy: Due to their strictly endogamous marriage practices and commercial dominance, the Chian families were frequently compared to the Jewish diaspora. The French historian Fustel de Coulanges, who visited the island in the 1850s, noted that "other Greeks do not want to accept that the Chians are of the same race as them," and reported that public opinion in rival ports like Syros and Smyrna was convinced that "the inhabitants of Chios constitute a Jewish colony." This perception was reflected in popular proverbs of the era, such as "Fifty Greeks make one Jew, and fifty Jews make one Chiot," highlighting their reputation for supreme business acumen.
- "Chiot Wealth": The reputation of the "rich Chian" was grounded in the reality of their dominance in global shipping and banking. By the mid-19th century, they had formed an "archontal oligarchy" of banking and navigation, controlling the grain trade from the Black Sea and the cotton trade from Egypt. The historian Mihail Dimitri Sturdza notes that even after their dispersion in 1822, the families maintained an "exclusivist matrimonial policy," marrying almost solely within their own group for over a century "as if they had never fled Chios."
- Distinct Identity: Unlike the Phanariotes, who sought integration into the Ottoman state bureaucracy and later the Greek royal court, the Chian nobles remained distinctly focused on commerce and private autonomy. As Sturdza observes, they "never manifested interest for high politics," preferring the independence of the "Nobility of the Ledger" to government service. Fustel de Coulanges described their power as a "flagrant usurpation" that was nonetheless respected by the population due to its ancient tradition, creating the perception of a "state within a state" that was culturally distinct from the mainland population.

== See also ==
- Lordship of Chios
- Maona of Chios and Phocaea
- Frankokratia
- Phanariotes
- Ralli Brothers

== Bibliography ==
- Argenti, Philip P. (1955). Libro d'Oro de la Noblesse de Chio. Vol. 1. London: Oxford University Press.
- Argenti, Philip P. (1958). The Occupation of Chios by the Genoese and their Administration of the Island 1346–1566. Cambridge University Press.
- Battista de Burgo, Giovanni (1686). Viaggio di cinque anni in Asia, Africa, & Europa del Turco. Milan: Giuseppe Cossuto.
- Instituto Luis de Salazar y Castro (1983). XV Congreso Internacional de las Ciencias Genealógica y Heráldica: Volumen Oficial. Madrid: Ediciones Hidalguía. ISBN 9788400054359.
- Karabelias, Giorgos (2011). Η οικονομική κρίση και ο καημός της ρωμιοσύνης [The Economic Crisis and the Grief of Romiosini].
- korinthia.net.gr (2021-01-29). "Σαν σήμερα το 1869 ήρθε στην Ελλάδα το ποδήλατο". korinthia.net.gr.
- Koukouni, Ioanna (2021). Chios dicta est... et in Aegæo sita mari: Historical Archaeology and Heraldry on Chios. Oxford: Archaeopress Publishing. ISBN 9781789697476.
- Miller, William (1908). The Latins in the Levant: A History of Frankish Greece (1204–1566). London: John Murray.
- Minoglou, Ioanna Pepelasis; Ioannides, Stavros (2004). "Market-Embedded Clans in Theory and History: Greek Diaspora Trading Companies in the Nineteenth Century" (PDF). Business History Conference. p. 21.
- Sturdza, Mihail Dimitri (1999). Grandes familles de Grèce: d'Albanie et de Constantinople.
