= Zaccaria (disambiguation) =

The Zaccaria family was an ancient and noble Genoese dynasty.

Zaccaria may also refer to:

== Given name ==
- Zaccaria Boveri or Boverius (1568–1638), Italian jurist and Capuchin Friar Minor
- Zaccaria Cometti (1937–2020), Italian footballer
- Zaccaria Delfino (1527–1584), Italian Roman Catholic cardinal, and bishop in modern-day Croatia
- Zaccaria della Vecchia (died 1625), Roman Catholic prelate, bishop of Torcello
- Zaccaria Giovanni Divanic (died 1562), Roman Catholic prelate, bishop of Pedena, Croatia
- Zaccaria Giacometti (1893–1970), Swiss professor of constitutional law
- Zaccaria de Moris (died 1517), Roman Catholic prelate, bishop of Terracina

== Surname ==
- Andronikos Asen Zaccaria (died 1401), Frankish lord of Achaea
- Anthony Zaccaria (1502–1539), leader of the Counter-Reformation
- Bartolomeo Zaccaria (died 1334), Marquess of Bodonitsa
- Benedetto I Zaccaria (c. 1235–1307), admiral of the Republic of Genoa
- Benedetto II Zaccaria (died 1330), co-Lord of Chios and other Aegean islands
- Catherine Zaccaria or Catherine Palaiologina (died 1462), daughter of the last Prince of Achaea, Centurione II
- Centurione I Zaccaria (1336–1376), noble in Achaea
- Centurione II Zaccaria (died 1432), Prince of Achaea
- Francesco Antonio Zaccaria (1714–1795), Italian theologian, historian, and writer
- Giuseppe Zaccaria (1930–1985), known as Pino Zac, Italian illustrator, cartoonist and animator
- John Asen Zaccaria (died 1469), son of the last Prince of Achaea, Centurione II
- Luke Zaccaria (born 1993), Australian track cyclist
- Manuele Zaccaria (died 1287/88), Genoese lord of Phocaea
- Maria II Zaccaria (fl. 1404), Princess of Achaia
- Martino Zaccaria, Lord of Chios 1314–1329, ruler of several Aegean islands
- Nicola Zaccaria (1923–2007), Greek bass
- Paleologo Zaccaria (died 1314), Lord of Chios and Phocaea and other Aegean islands
- Stephen Zaccaria, Latin Archbishop of Patras from 1404
- Tedisio Zaccaria, lord of Thasos, governor of Phocaea 1302–1307

== Other uses ==
- Zaccaria (company), an Italian pinball and arcade machine manufacturer
- San Zaccaria, Venice, a 15th-century former monastic church

== See also ==
- Zechariah (disambiguation)
- Zacharias (surname)
