= Zacharias (surname) =

The surname Zacharias and various related forms are derived from the Hebrew given name Zechariah. Notable people with this surname or its variants include:

== Medieval period ==
- Bartolomeo Zaccaria (d. 1334), Margrave of Bodonitsa
- Benedetto I Zaccaria (c. 1235–1307), Lord of Phocea and Chios
- Paleologo Zaccaria (d. 1314), Lord of Phocea and Chios
- Benedetto II Zaccaria (d. 1330), Lord of Phocea and Chios
- Martino Zaccaria (d. 1345), Lord of Phocea and Chios
- Nicolaus Zacharie (c.1400–1466), Italian composer
- Stephen or Stefano Zaccaria, Latin Archbishop and Baron of Patras (1405–1424)
- Zaharia family, Albanian noble family of the 14th and 15th century
- Abū Bakr Muhammad ibn Zakarīya al-Rāzi (865–925 AD), also known as Razi and Rhazes, Persian (Iranian) physician, philosopher and scholar

== Early Modern period ==
- Anthony Maria Zaccaria (1502–1539), Italian priest and Roman Catholic saint
- Francesco Antonio Zaccaria (1714–1795), Italian theologian and historian

== Modern times ==
=== Zacarías ===
- Miguel Zacarías (1905–2006), Mexican film director

=== Zaccaria ===
- Nicola Zaccaria (1923–2007), Greek opera singer

=== Zacharia ===
- Janine Zacharia, American journalist
- Katie Zacharia, American political commentator, briefly White House Press Secretary
- Paul Zacharia (born 1945), Indian writer and activist

=== Zachariae ===
- Karl Eduard Zachariae (1812–1894), German jurist

=== Zacharias ===
- Christian Zacharias (born 1950), German pianist and conductor
- Ernst Zacharias (1924–2020), German musician
- Helmut Zacharias (1920–2002), German violinist and composer
- Jerrold R. Zacharias (1905–1986), American scientist and engineer
- John Forney Zacharias (1837–1904), American surgeon
- Otto Zacharias (1846–1916), German biologist and popular scientific journalist
- Ravi Zacharias (1946–2020), Canadian-American author and Christian apologist
- Sascha Zacharias (born 1979), Swedish actress
- Thomas Zacharias (baseball) (died 1892), American baseball umpire
- Thomas Zacharias (high jump) (born 1947), German high jumper
- Willi Zacharias (1914–2006), Romanian handball player, Nordic combined skier, and cross-country skier

=== Zachary ===
- Chris Zachary (1944–2003), American baseball player
- Tom Zachary (1896–1944), American baseball player

=== Zachery ===
- James Zachery (1958–1994), American football player

=== Zachry ===
- Pat Zachry (born 1952), American baseball player

=== Zaharia ===
- Zaharia, dedicated article for the Albanian and Romanian variant of the name

=== Zaharias ===
- Mildred "Babe" Zaharias (1911–1956), versatile American athlete

=== Zakaria ===
- Fareed Zakaria (born 1964), Indian-American journalist
- Rafiq Zakaria (1920–2005), Indian politician and Islamic scholar

=== Zekaria ===
- Samia Zekaria (born 1955), Ethiopian diplomat

== See also ==
- Zacharias (given name), the main article about the name Zacharias and its many variants (Zechariah, Zachariah, Zachary, etc.)
- Zakariya, Arabic form of the name
- Zakaryan, Eastern Armenian form of the name
