= Leo Kalothetos =

14th-century Byzantine politician

Leo Kalothetos (Greek: Λέων Καλόθετος, fl. 1315–1363) was a provincial governor of the Byzantine Empire.

Kalothetos was a native of Chios, where he is mentioned for the first time in 1315. At the time, the island was a possession of the Genoese Zaccaria family, who held it de jure as a fief from the Byzantine Emperor, but practically as an independent domain. In 1328, Kalothetos fled the island and joined the Emperor Andronikos III Palaiologos at Didymoteichon. Together they planned the recovery of Chios by the Byzantines. Aided by a revolt of the local population and the treachery of Benedetto II Zaccaria, brother of the island's ruler Martino Zaccaria, a Byzantine fleet regained the island in 1329. Martino Zaccaria was captured, and Kalothetos was installed as the new governor of the island.

Kalothetos was an old friend of John Kantakouzenos, Andronikos III's closest friend and chief aide. Consequently, when the civil war between Kantakouzenos and the regency for John V Palaiologos broke out, he was dismissed by order of Alexios Apokaukos and replaced with Caloiane Civo. He fled to join Kantakouzenos, and is attested in 1345 with the rank of protosebastos, as an envoy to the megas stratopedarches John Vatatzes. He reappears in 1349, when he witnessed a treaty with the Republic of Venice in Constantinople. From 1348 until 1363, he was appointed governor of Old Phocaea. In 1358, he was involved in the affair of the Ottoman prince (şehzade) Halil, who was captured by Greek pirates and held in Phocaea in captivity. Kalothetos refused the demands of Emperor John V to release Halil, until he received in exchange 100,000 hyperpyra. At this time, Kalothetos held the rank of panhypersebastos.

== Sources ==
- Nicol, Donald M. (1993). The Last Centuries of Byzantium, 1261–1453 (Second ed.). London: Rupert Hart-Davis Ltd. ISBN 0-246-10559-3.
- Trapp, Erich; Walther, Rainer; Beyer, Hans-Veit; Sturm-Schnabl, Katja (1981). "10617. Καλόθετος Λέων". Prosopographisches Lexikon der Palaiologenzeit (in German). Vol. 5. Vienna: Verlag der Österreichischen Akademie der Wissenschaften. ISBN 3-7001-3003-1.
