= Benedetto Zaccaria =

Benedetto Zaccaria may refer to:

- Benedetto I Zaccaria (d. 1307), lord of Phocaea and Chios
- Benedetto II Zaccaria (d. 1330), lord of Chios
