= Lordship of Phocaea =

Byzantine lordship

The Lordship of Phocaea (Greek: Ηγεμονία της Φώκαιας) was founded after in 1275, when the Genoese nobleman Manuele Zaccaria received the twin towns of Old Phocaea and New Phocaea as a fief from the Byzantine emperor Andronikos II Palaiologos. The Zaccaria family amassed a considerable fortune from their properties there, especially the rich alum mines. The Zaccaria held the lordship until 1340, when it was repossessed by the Byzantines under Andronikos III Palaiologos.

== Lords of Old and New Phocaea ==
- 1275–1288 Manuele Zaccaria
- 1288–1304 Benedetto I Zaccaria
- 1304–1314 Benedetto II Zaccaria
- 1314–1331 Andriolo Cattaneo (he married Aeliana Zaccaria)
- 1331–1340 Domenico Cattaneo

== Governors of Old and New Phocaea ==
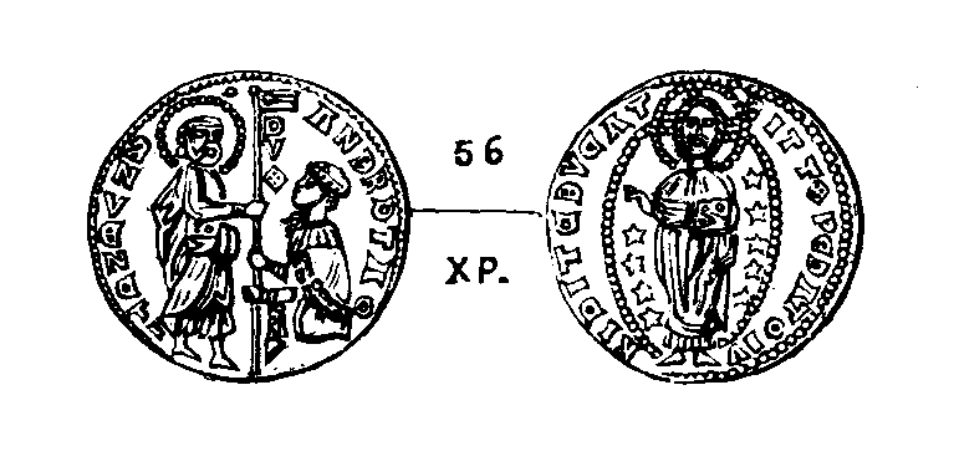
Ducat of Andriolo Cattaneo

- 1302–1307 Tedisio Zaccaria
- 1307 Nicolino Zaccaria
- 1307–1314 Andriolo Cattaneo
- 1329 Arrigo Tartaro

== Sources ==
- Ανέκδοτα νομίσματα και μολυβδόβουλλα των κατά τους μέσους αιώνας Δυναστών της Ελλάδος / υπό Παύλου Λάμπρου, Εν Αθήναις : Εκ του Τυπογραφείου αδελφών Πέρρη, 1880, pages 66–73
- Miller, William (1921). "The Zaccaria of Phocaea and Chios (1275-1329)". Essays on the Latin Orient. Cambridge: Cambridge University Press. pp. 283–298. OCLC 457893641.
