= Tedisio Zaccaria =

Tedisio Zaccaria was lord of Thasos and governor of Phocaea from 1302 to 1307. A descendant of the important Genoese family of Zaccaria, he was the son of Manuele Zaccaria and Clarisia Fieschi. His father was the brother of Benedetto I Zaccaria, the founder of Zaccaria fortunes in Byzantium and Latin Greece.

He was appointed governor of Phocaea by his uncle Benedetto I and remained in office after his death, when he became governor of the Lordship of Chios. In 1306 Tedisio campaigned in Thasos, where he captured the castle and made the island his fief. In 1307 Benedetto II Zaccaria decided to replace to Tedisio with a new governor.

The new governor, Andriolo Cattaneo, sent his son Domenico against Tedisio, and took over Phocaea. Tedisio then fled to Gallipoli where he sought the support of the Catalan Company. In 1307 he campaigned against Phocaea. After a siege he captured the city, but he was unable to keep it under control, and was forced to retreat to Thasos to defend his fief. The Catalan historian Ramon Muntaner refers in his Chronicle that the raid into the castle of Phokaia allowed Zaccaria to take with him the relics of the Holy Cross, a white shirt made by the Virgin Mary, and a codex with the Apocalypsis, all of them taken after the Turkish conquest into Pholaia from the tomb of Saint John, the author of the Gospel, in Ephesos. The fragments of the Holy Cross were given to the same Muntaner, as he was the Chancellor of the Catalan Company, while Zaccaria retained the other relics. Zaccaria remained lord of Thasos until 1313, when the island was reconquered by the Byzantines.

== Sources ==
- Miller, William (1921). "The Zaccaria of Phocaea and Chios (1275-1329)". Essays on the Latin Orient. Cambridge: Cambridge University Press. pp. 283–298.
