= Aimon of Rans =

Aimon de Rans was the lord of half of the Barony of Chalandritsa in Frankish Greece from 1311 to ca. 1316. After his victory over Ferdinand of Majorca at the Battle of Manolada, Louis of Burgundy, the new Prince of Achaea, gave the entire vacant barony to two of his Burgundian followers, Aimon of Rans and his brother, Otho. Otho died soon after, and Aimon sold the domain to Martino Zaccaria, Lord of Chios, and returned to his homeland.

== Bibliography ==
- Bon, Antoine (1969). La Morée franque. Recherches historiques, topographiques et archéologiques sur la principauté d'Achaïe [The Frankish Morea. Historical, Topographic and Archaeological Studies on the Principality of Achaea] (in French). Paris: De Boccard. OCLC 869621129.
- Topping, Peter (1975). "The Morea, 1364–1460". In Setton, Kenneth M.; Hazard, Harry W. (eds.). A History of the Crusades, Volume III: The Fourteenth and Fifteenth Centuries. Vol. 3. Madison and London: University of Wisconsin Press. pp. 141–166. ISBN 0-299-06670-3.
