= Colvocoresses =

Colvocoresses can refer to:

== People ==
- Alden Partridge Colvocoresses (1918–2007), cartographer and US Army officer
- George Colvocoresses (1816–1872), Greek-American Navy officer, father of George Partridge Colvocoresses
- George Partridge Colvocoresses (1847–1932), United States Navy real admiral

== Places ==
- Colvocoresses Bay, a bay formed by the right angle of the Budd Coast at Williamson Glacier
- Colvocoresses Reef, a wholly submerged atoll in the Indian Ocean

== See also ==
- Calvocoressi (disambiguation)
