= Simone Vignoso =

14th-century Genoese admiral

- Military career
- Allegiance: Republic of Genoa
- Service years: 1345–1350
- Conflicts: Genoese conquest of Chios

Simone Vignoso was a 14th-century Genoese admiral. In 1346 he led a fleet that conquered the island of Chios and the port of Phocaea, establishing the Genoese-run Maona of Chios and Phocaea company there. Nothing is known of him after 1350.

== Life ==
Simone Vignoso is first mentioned in 1345, as the admiral of a Genoese fleet intended to fight the Grimaldi, rebel Genoese nobles who had found refuge in Monaco. As the revolt failed and the nobles abandoned Monaco for Marseille, the fleet was redirected east, to defend Genoese trade interests in the routes leading to the Black Sea, and possibly relieve the Siege of Caffa.

Vignoso and his 29 galleys left Genoa in May, and arrived at the Venetian colony of Negroponte on the eastern coast of Greece on 8 June 1346. There the Genoese encountered the fleet of Humbert II of Viennois, part of the Second Smyrniote Crusade. Vignoso learned that Humbert aimed to capture the island of Chios, which from 1304 to 1329 had been a possession of the Genoese Zaccaria family. Humbert aimed to use Chios as a base for his anti-Turkish operations, and Pope Clement VI had already contacted the Byzantine empress-regent, Anne of Savoy, in order to allow use of the island for this purpose. Humbert tried to induce the Genoese to support his planned attack on Chios, promising lavish rewards. The Genoese not only refused, but attacked the crusader fleet, seized horses and equipment from it, and proceeded to attack Chios themselves. In this the Genoese were driven by politics—a joint venture against Chios would benefit chiefly Humbert and his Venetian allies, Genoa's traditional rivals—but also by the expectation of profit: the Genoese government had promised to reimburse the expenses of the private citizens who owned and equipped Vignoso's galleys, but until such time, the loot or other profits of the fleet would go to the ships' owners.

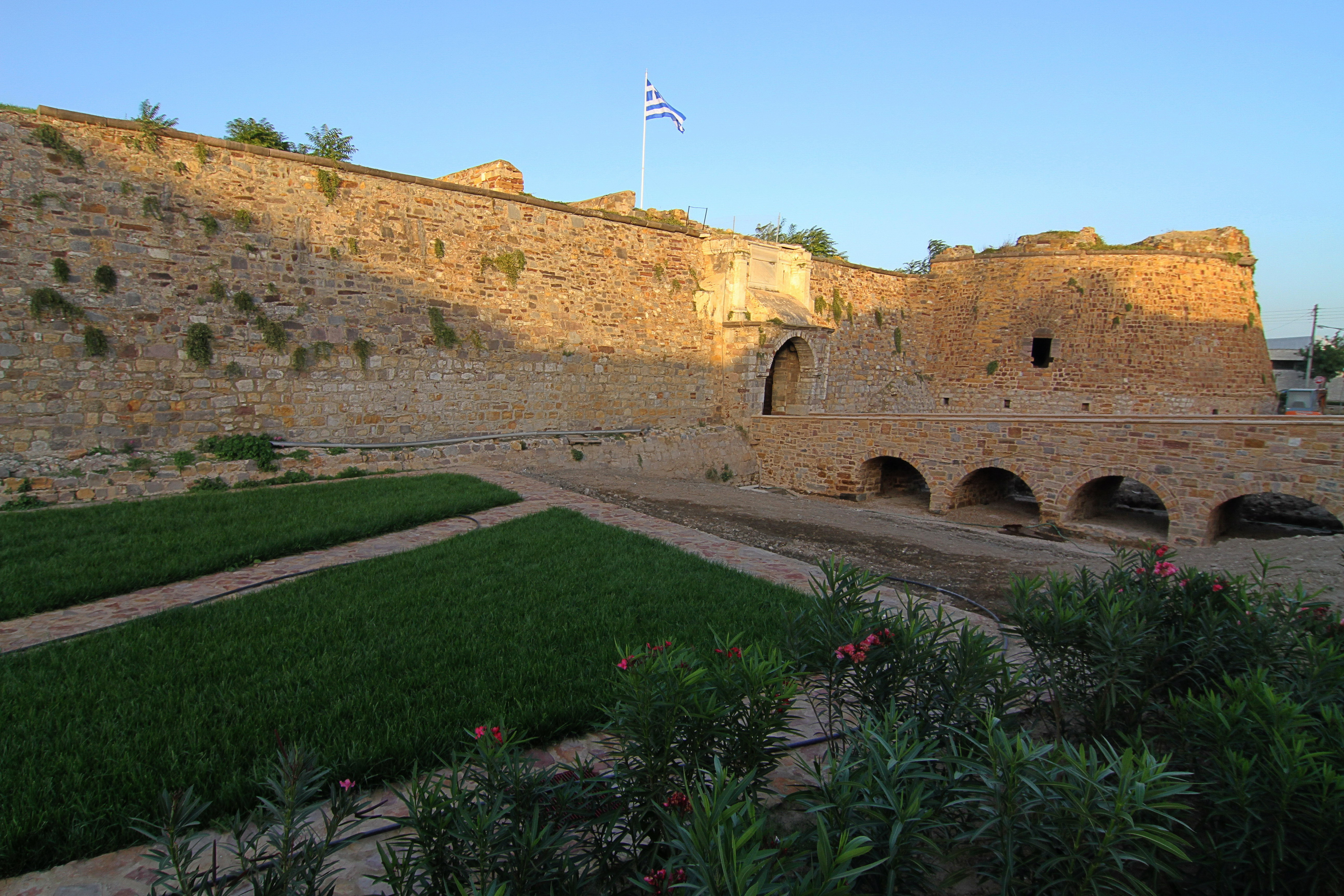
View of the citadel of Chios in 2013

The Genoese landed on Chios on 15 June, and captured the island within a week, apart from the citadel of the capital, which resisted until 12 September. The local Greeks initially rejected the Genoese calls for surrender with the cry "Death to the Genoese!", but they could not expect any support from the Byzantine government, who were in the throes of an exhaustive civil war. The surrender of the citadel was accompanied by a treaty between the local Greek archons and the Genoese, which offered very lenient terms to the Greek magnates: they swore an oath of allegiance to the Republic of Genoa, but were otherwise left in possession of their estates, their privileges conferred by the Byzantine emperors were left intact, and the Orthodox churches and clergy were placed in their care. The governor of the citadel, Caloianni Tzybos, was furthermore promised 7,000 hyperpyra over three years, and exempted from taxation along with his family.

Within another week, Vignoso occupied the ports of Old Phocaea and New Phocaea on the Anatolian coast, also formerly possessions of the Zaccaria, and centres of an extremely profitable trade due to their alum mines. Vignoso also aimed to capture the islands of Lesbos and Tenedos, but his exhausted crews refused to follow him. The former governor of the citadel of Chios, Tzybos, was named governor of Old Phocaea.

At Chios, Vignoso and the other stakeholders of the expedition formed a joint stock company to exploit their new possessions, the Maona of Chios and Phocaea, on 26 February 1347. A revolt by the Greek magnates in 1347 was suppressed, and their privileges suspended and possessions confiscated and distributed among the Genoese colonists and Maona shareholders. Vignoso himself was governor (podestà) of the Maona in 1350. Nothing further is known of him after.

The conquest of Chios gave Genoa crucial strategic bases in the Aegean, counterbalancing the long-established Venetian presence in the area, but antagonized both the Venetians and the Byzantines was one of the main precipitating factors for the outbreak of the Third Genoese–Venetian War.

== Sources ==
- Balard, Michel (2016). "The Genoese in the Aegean (1204–1566)". In Stuckey, Jace (ed.). The Eastern Mediterranean Frontier of Latin Christendom. London and New York: Routledge. pp. 117–133. ISBN 978-1-47242275-0.
- Miller, William (1921). "The Zaccaria of Phocaea and Chios (1275-1329)". Essays on the Latin Orient. Cambridge: Cambridge University Press. pp. 283–298.
- Musarra, Antonio (2020). Il Grifo e il Leone: Genova e Venezia in lotta per il Mediterraneo (in Italian). Bari and Rome: Editori Laterza. ISBN 978-88-581-4072-7.
- Setton, Kenneth M. (1976). The Papacy and the Levant (1204–1571), Volume I: The Thirteenth and Fourteenth Centuries. Vol. 1. Philadelphia: The American Philosophical Society. ISBN 0-87169-114-0.
- Vitale, Vito Antonio (1937). "VIGNOSO, Simone". Enciclopedia Italiana (in Italian).
