= Rodocanachi family =

Greek noble family

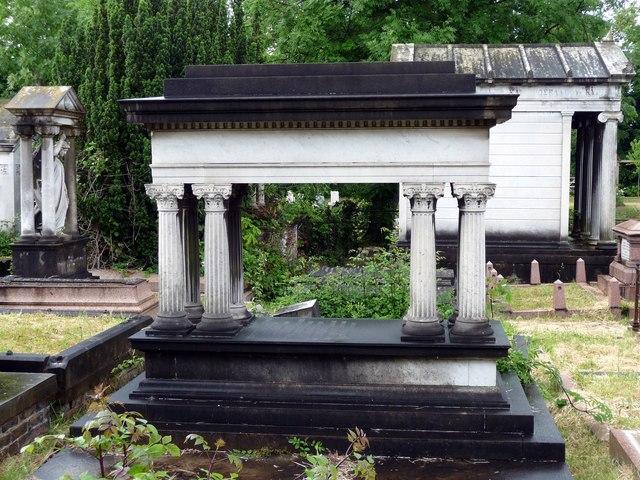
Rodocanachi family mausoleum in Greek Orthodox Cemetery, West Norwood Cemetery, London

The Rodocanachi family (Greek: Ροδοκανάκης, romanized: Rodokanakis) is the name of an old Greek Phanariote family, originating from the nobility of the island of Chios, whose members played important political role in the history of modern Greece, the Danubian Principalities and later in the United Kingdom.

== Notable members ==
- Constantine Rodocanachi (1635–1687), Ottoman-Greek physician, chemist, lexicographer and academic
- Demetrius Rhodocanakis (1840–1902), British-Greek merchant and pretender
- George Rodocanachi (1875-1944), British-born physician, World War II escape line leader.
- Jacques Rodocanachi (1882-1925), French fencer
- Michel Emmanuel Rodocanachi (1821-1901), Greek trader and banker of London
- Paolo Rodocanachi (1891-1958), Italian-born Greek painter
- Pierre Rodocanachi (born 1938), French fencer
