= Lordship of Chios =

Autonomous lordship the Aegean Sea

Lordship of Chios Χίος
- Genoese lordship in Byzantine territory
- 1304–1329
- Flag Coat of arms
- Capital: Chios
- Area
  - Coordinates: 40°38′N 22°57′E
- Government
  - Type: Feudal lordship
- Lord
  - 1304–1307: Benedetto I Zaccaria
  - 1307–1314: Benedetto II "Paleologo" Zaccaria
  - 1314–1329: Martino Zaccaria
- Historical era: Middle Ages
  - Established: 1304
  - Reconquest by the Byzantines: 1329
  - Capture of Chios by the Genoese: 1346
Preceded by	Succeeded by
Byzantine Empire	Byzantine Empire
- Today part of: Greece

The Lordship of Chios was a short-lived autonomous lordship run by the Genoese Zaccaria family. Its core was the eastern Aegean island of Chios, and in its height it encompassed a number of other islands off the shore of Asia Minor. Although theoretically a vassal of the Byzantine Empire, the Zaccaria ruled the island as a practically independent domain from its capture in 1304 until the Greek-Byzantines recovered it, with the support of the local Greek population, in 1329. The island would return to Genoese control in 1346 under the Maona of Chios and Phocaea.

== History ==
The lordship was founded in 1304, when the Genoese noble Benedetto I Zaccaria captured the Byzantine island of Chios. Benedetto, who was already lord of Phocaea on the coast of Asia Minor, justified his act to the Byzantine court as necessary to prevent the island's capture by Turkish pirates. The Byzantine emperor, Andronikos II Palaiologos, impotent to intervene militarily, accepted the fait accompli and granted him the island as a fief, initially for a period of 10 years, but which was then renewed at five-year intervals. Benedetto died in 1307 and was succeeded in Chios by his son, Benedetto II "Paleologo" Zaccaria. When he died in 1314, the island passed to his sons, Martino and his brother, Benedetto III. Chios was a small but wealthy domain, with an annual income of 120,000 gold hyperpyra. Over the next few years, Martino made it the core of a small realm encompassing several islands off the shore of Asia Minor, including Samos and Kos. Martino, with his small army and fleet, achieved considerable successes against the Turkish pirates, and won praise by his Latin contemporaries, the Pope, and Philip II, the titular Latin emperor of Constantinople, who in 1325 named him "King and Despot of Asia Minor".

Despite Martino's ties to the Latin Emperor, while Andronikos II reigned relations with the Byzantine Empire remained good, and the lease of Chios was renewed in 1324. At the same time, however, Martino's behaviour became increasingly assertive, and in ca. 1325 he ousted his brother as co-ruler of Chios. In 1328 the young and energetic Andronikos III Palaiologos succeeded his grandfather on the Byzantine throne. One of the leading Chian nobles, Leo Kalothetos, went on behalf of the Chian population to meet the new emperor and his chief minister, John Kantakouzenos, to propose a reconquest of the island. Andronikos III readily agreed, and, finding a pretext in Martino's unauthorized construction of a fortress, sailed with a large fleet against him. Martino barricaded himself in his castle, but after witnessing the defection of the native Greek population, and the surrender of his brother, he too decided to capitulate. Benedetto III was initially offered the right to govern the island in the emperor's name, but his demand to receive the same autonomy and rights as his brother was unacceptable to Andronikos III, and Kalothetos was named instead.

Chios returned to Byzantine control where it remained until 1346, when the Genoese Simone Vignoso captured it, taking advantage of the Byzantine civil war of 1341–1347. The island became the seat of the Maona di Chio e di Focea company, and fell under the rule of the Giustiniani family, who held it until 1566, when it finally capitulated to the Ottoman Empire.

== Lords ==
- 1304–1307 Benedetto I Zaccaria
- 1307–1314 Benedetto II "Paleologo" Zaccaria
- 1314–1329 Martino Zaccaria, with
- 1314 – ca. 1325 Benedetto III Zaccaria

== Sources ==
- Miller, William (1921). "The Zaccaria of Phocaea and Chios (1275-1329)". Essays on the Latin Orient. Cambridge: Cambridge University Press. pp. 283–298. OCLC 457893641.
- Nicol, Donald M. (1993). The Last Centuries of Byzantium, 1261–1453 (Second ed.). Cambridge: Cambridge University Press. ISBN 978-0-521-43991-6.
