= Manuele Zaccaria =

Manuele Zaccaria (died 1287/88) was the Genoese lord of Phocaea and its profitable alum mines, which he received as a fief from the Byzantine Emperor, from 1275 until his death in 1287/88. He was succeeded by his brother, Benedetto I Zaccaria.

His parents were Fulcone Zaccaria and one of his wives: Giulietta or Beatrice. Manuele married Clarisia Fieschi, and had four sons, Tedisio, Leonardo, Odoardo and Manfredo.

== Sources ==
- Miller, William (1921). "The Zaccaria of Phocaea and Chios (1275-1329)". Essays on the Latin Orient. Cambridge: Cambridge University Press. pp. 283–298.
- Trapp, Erich; Walther, Rainer; Beyer, Hans-Veit; Sturm-Schnabl, Katja (1978). "6494. Zαχαρίας Μανουήλ". Prosopographisches Lexikon der Palaiologenzeit (in German). Vol. 3. Vienna: Verlag der Österreichischen Akademie der Wissenschaften.
