= Maona of Chios and Phocaea =

Company)

Maona of Chios and Phocaea Maona di Chio e di Focea
- 1346–1566
- Flag Coat of arms
- Status: Protectorate of Genoa
- Capital: Chios
- History
  - Established: 1346
  - Disestablished: 1566
Preceded by	Succeeded by
Byzantine Empire	Ottoman Empire

Maona of Chios and Phocaea (Italian: Maona di Chio e di Focea; 1346–1566) was a maona formed to exact taxes for the Republic of Genoa from the island of Chios and port of Phocaea. Genoa sold the rights to their taxes to the maona, which raised funds from its investors to buy galleys and eventually re-conquer Chios and Phocaea.

== History ==
The Genoese authorities of Chios and their Greek subjects (who constituted the majority of island's population - 80%) were subjects of the Republic of Genoa. Initially, many of the Mahona associates and therefore members of the island's administration were citizens as well as inhabitants of Genoa. The members of the company for more than two centuries were entitled to the revenues deriving from the natural or economic resources of the island. In return they had to pay an annual tribute to Genoa.

After two years, the original shareholders that lived in Genoa sold their shares to some colonists that already lived in Chios or to some Genoese citizens that migrated to the island. These new members constituted the New Mahona that was also subsequently became known as the Mahona (or Maona) of the Giustiniani. Since the Republic was unable to redeem the island from the Giustiniani, Chios remained in their possession till its final fall to the Turks. In the mean-time the Mahonesi had to pay tributes to Genoa, at the beginning to the Byzantine emperor John V Palaiologos in 1363 and finally to the Turks.

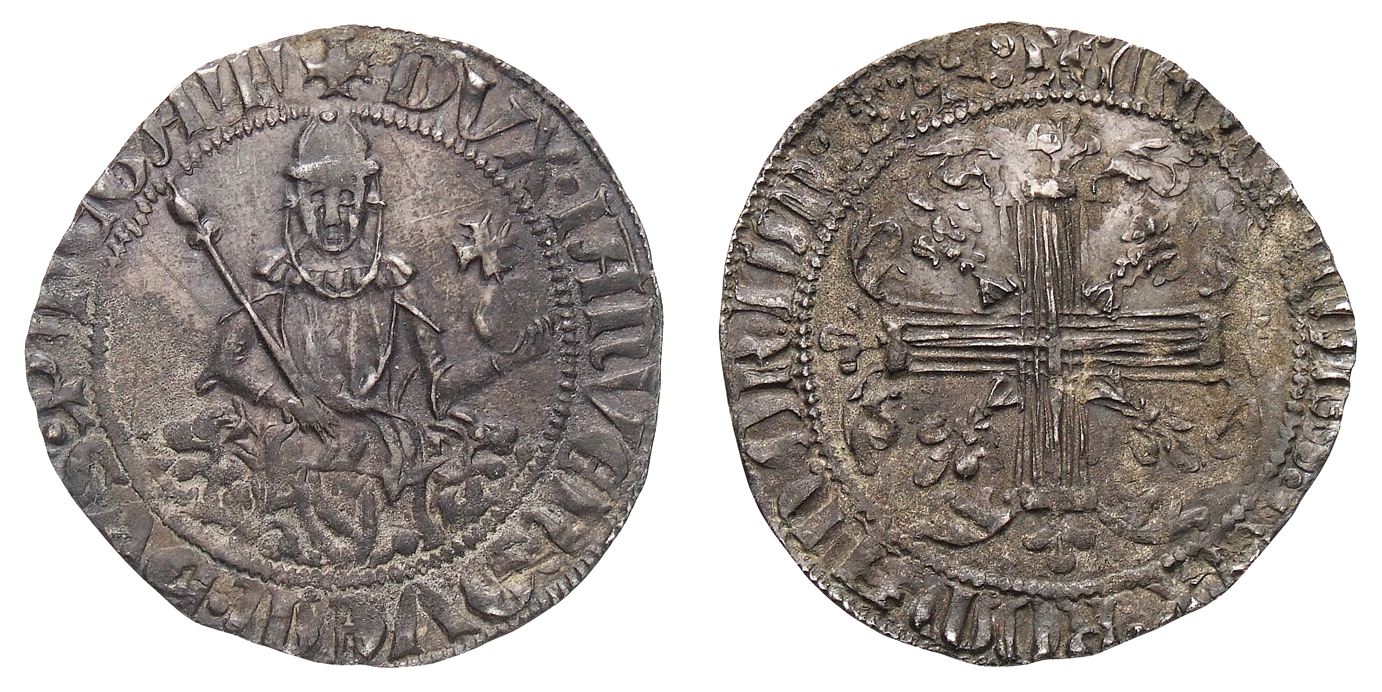
Silver coin minted by the Maona

The republic engaged to secure these citizens against all loss, and pledged a portion of the annual revenues of the state pay the interest on their advances. Each subscriber had paid down 400 Genoese livres; twenty-six galleys had been equipped by the commons and three by the nobles. Once the conquest of Chios was successfully achieved, the ship-owners then returned to Genoa and advanced the sum of 250,000 lire to cover the expenses of the campaign. After long deliberations, an agreement was concluded on 26 February 1347 between the Commune and the group of its creditors represented by the Genoese admiral Simone Vignoso. This association took the name of Maona of Chios. The debt owed to the ship-owners was repaid in shares, or "luoghi", to an amount of 203,000 Genoese lire.

This was less than the commanders of the ships demanded, but nonetheless they got property and the administration of Chios and Phocaea, in addition to the revenues provided by the "luoghi". The more-or-less forced benevolence of the ship-owners made up for the deficiencies of the state, which was then obliged to hand over public revenues to them to meet its obligations.

The Genoaese family of Giustiniani, with their Maona, governed Chios, appointing a commissioner and commanding 52 military Genuates (tribes from around Genoa) in the island: during these years (1346–1566), the trade revived and the island enjoyed huge prosperity. One of the trades were the Genoese slave trade. Chios was a base of the traffic of the Balkan slave trade, to which slaves were transported from the Balkans across the Adriatic Sea to the Aegean Sea, to Chios or Candia, from which they were sold on to either slavery in Spain in the West or slavery in Egypt in the South.

The Mahona of Chios ended its activities in 1566 when the Turks invaded and occupied the island. Admiral Piyale Pasha annexed it to the Ottoman Empire. His sultan had a good pretext for putting an end to the government of the Giustiniani, for the island served as a place of refuge for fugitive slaves and the refreshment of Christian corsairs.
