= Calvocoressi =

Calvocoressi is a surname, and may refer to:

- Gabrielle Calvocoressi (born 1974), American poet and academic
- Ion Calvocoressi (1919–2007), British Army officer and stockbroker
- Michel-Dimitri Calvocoressi (1877–1944), French music critic and musicologist
- Peter Calvocoressi (1912–2010), British historian, intelligence officer and politician
- Richard Calvocoressi (born 1951), British curator and art historian

== See also ==
- Colvocoresses (disambiguation)
