= Paleologo Zaccaria =

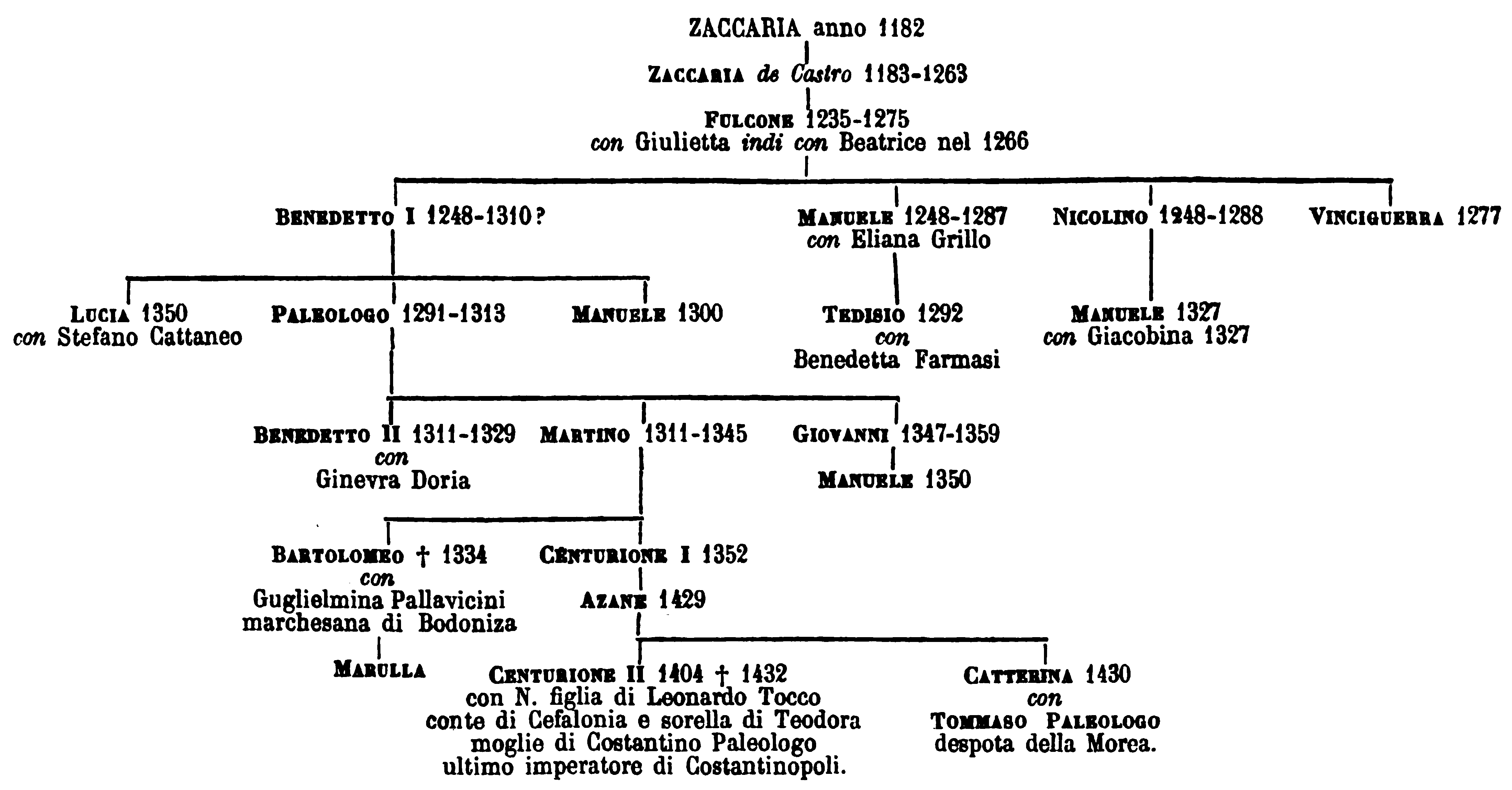
Family tree of the Zaccaria family in Latin Greece

Paleologo Zaccaria ( ? –1314) was the Lord of Chios and Phocaea, as well as other Aegean islands from 1307 until his death.

Paleologo was the son of Benedetto I Zaccaria Lord of Chios and Pocaea; his mother was a Palaiologina, sister of the Emperor Michael VIII. His first name is unknown, as is the first name of his mother. On the death of his father, he succeeded him.

The brothers Benedetto II Zaccaria and Martino Zaccaria were his sons (or his cousins, sons of Nicolino Zaccaria).

== Sources ==
- Miller, William (1921). "The Zaccaria of Phocaea and Chios (1275-1329)". Essays on the Latin Orient. Cambridge: Cambridge University Press. pp. 283–298. OCLC 457893641.
- Setton, Kenneth M. (general editor) A History of the Crusades: Volume III — The Fourteenth and Fifteenth Centuries. Harry W. Hazard, editor. University of Wisconsin Press: Madison, 1975.
- Setton, Kenneth M. Catalan Domination of Athens 1311–1380. Revised edition. Variorum: London, 1975.

Preceded by Benedetto I Zaccaria	Lord of Chios; 1307–1314	Succeeded by Martino Zaccaria and Benedetto II Zaccaria
