= Zaccaria =

Genoese noble family

- Parent family: de Castro
- Country: Republic of Genoa
- Etymology: Zaccaria de Castro
- Founded: c. 1235
- Founder: Fulcone Zaccaria (son of Zaccaria de Castro)
- Titles: Lord of Chios; Lord of Phocaea; Lord of Samos; Lord of Ikaria; Lord of Thasos; Noble and Patrician of Genoa; Admiral of Castile; Admiral of France; Hidalgo (in Castile)
- Estate: Zaccaria Palace, Genoa
- Cadet branches: Zaccaria de Damalà; Zacarías de Jerez

The Zaccaria family was a noble Genoese family that had great importance in the development and consolidation of the Republic of Genoa in the thirteenth and fourteenth centuries, and whose only surviving branch (Zaccaria de Damalà) produced the last ruling dynasty of the Principality of Achaea in Frankish Greece.

== History ==
The Zaccaria family, also named Zaccaria di Castro, through their descent from a branch of the older De Castro family from Gavi, which was further a branch of the viscounts of Carmandino, dating back to 952, was a very prominent family in the Republic of Genoa, which following the Treaty of Nymphaeum of 1261, were granted by Byzantine emperor Michael VIII Palaiologos important trading rights in the Empire of Nicaea, as a reward for the help received in the recovery of the Byzantine Empire, and, more generally, in an anti-Venetian function.

In this context, the Zaccaria assumed the lordship of Phocaea in 1275, first with Manuele then with his son Tedisio and, then, with Benedetto I Zaccaria, who also held high posts as admiral of the Republic in Genoa, and admiral of the Kingdoms of France and of Castille. Phocaea was an important commercial port, with its hinterland rich in alum, mineral at the time used for the tanning of leathers and fabrics.

In Genoa, they established intense relationships with the most important families of the aristocracy through marriages:

- Orietta Zaccaria married Reinaldo Spinola
- Velocchia Zaccaria married Nicoloso Doria
- Benedetto II "Paleologo" Zaccaria married Giacomina Spinola
- Argentina Zaccaria married Paolino Doria
- Eliana Zaccaria married Andreolo Cattaneo della Volta

The Zaccaria controlled all the alum trade: from extraction to transport to its transformation and sale mainly in Flanders.

After alternating events that saw the Zaccaria lose, at the hands of the Venetians, and reconquer Phocaea and the island of Chios, they also took possession of the island of Samos. Benedetto II, known as Paleologo, due to his mother's lineage, son of Benedetto Zaccaria, on his death in 1307, assumed the title of Lord of Phocaea and Chios.

He was succeeded in the title by his two sons, Martino Zaccaria, who would achieve further titular recognizion as King and Despot of Asia Minor from titular Latin Emperor Phillip III, and Benedetto III, their lordship reconfirmed and increased with the dominion of Samos, Tenedos, Marmora, Mytilene, and other territories.

After various events, he married in 1311 with Jacqueline de la Roche, the last heir of the Dukes of Athens, receiving as a dowry the baronies of Veligosti in Messenia and Damala on the Argolid Peninsula, he died in Smyrna in 1345. Upon his death, his eldest living son, Centurione I Zaccaria, inherited his father's titles which bolstered his position in Latin Greece, having already inherited the title of Baron of Damala from his elder brother, Bartolomeo Zaccaria, upon his death in 1334. Centurione was married to the daughter of Andronikos Asen, the son of Ivan Asen III of Bulgaria and Irene Palaiologina, daughter of Michael VIII Palaiologos. In 1364, Centurione assumed the office of Bailiff of Achaea, in which he ruled in the name of the absent princes until his death in the 1380s.

The Zaccaria de Damalà branch in Greece would end up in time outranking, outshining, and outliving the main Genoese branch of the Zaccaria family through their own merits and exploits, rising to become the last ruling dynasty of the Principality of Achaea, and would later become the prominent Damalas noble family in Chios and in the modern Kingdom of Greece.

=== Hypothesis of descent: the Sechiari family ===
In addition to the Damalas family, several historians and genealogists specializing in Greek aristocracy suggest that the Zaccaria lineage may have also survived in Chios under another surname. The prominent family of Greco-Byzantine archons, the Sechiari (Σεκιάρης), is theorized to be the direct descendant of the Genoese dynasty, following a linguistic alteration of the name under Ottoman rule.

The historian and genealogist Philip Argenti, in his work on the Libro d'Oro of the nobility of Chios, supports this thesis by highlighting the phonetic and historical evolution of the name: "It could well be, moreover, that the surname of the Sechiari is merely a deformation of the true vanished name. This would perhaps be, as several genealogists who, like us, study the origin of noble Greek families believe, the Turkish transcription of the name Zaccaria, of which we find no further trace in Greece from the 19th century onwards."

== See also ==
- Republic of Genoa
- Doria
- Adorno family
- Michael VIII Palaiologos
- House of Spinola
- Damalas
