= Benedetto I Zaccaria =

Genoese admiral (c. 1235 – 1307)

Benedetto I Zaccaria (c. 1235 – 1307) was an Italian admiral of the Republic of Genoa. He was the Lord of Phocaea (from 1288) and first Lord of Chios (from 1304), and the founder of Zaccaria fortunes in Byzantine and Latin Greece. He was, at different stages in his life, a diplomat, adventurer, mercenary, and statesman.

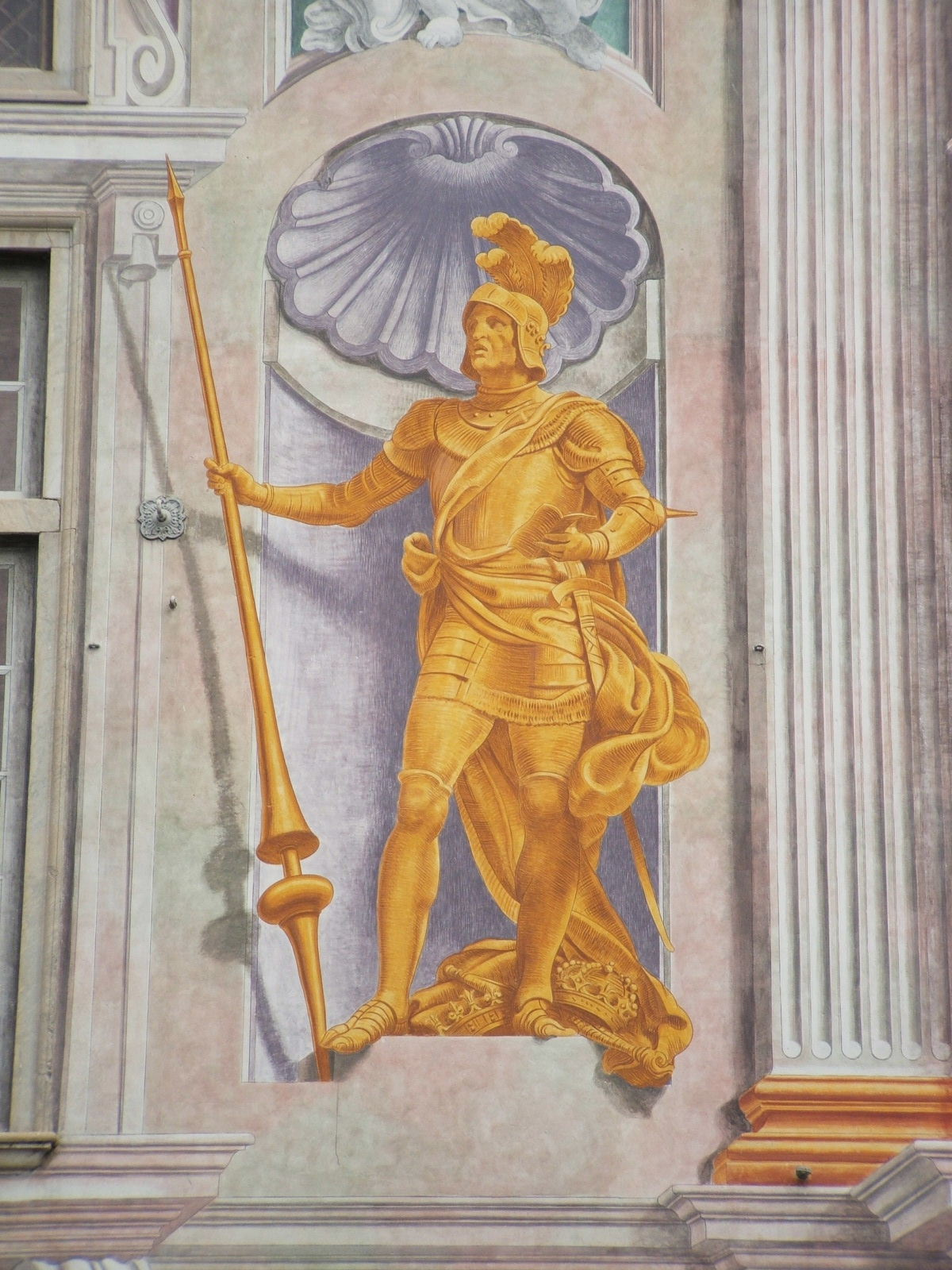
Benedetto Zaccaria, Genova-Palazzo San Giorgio

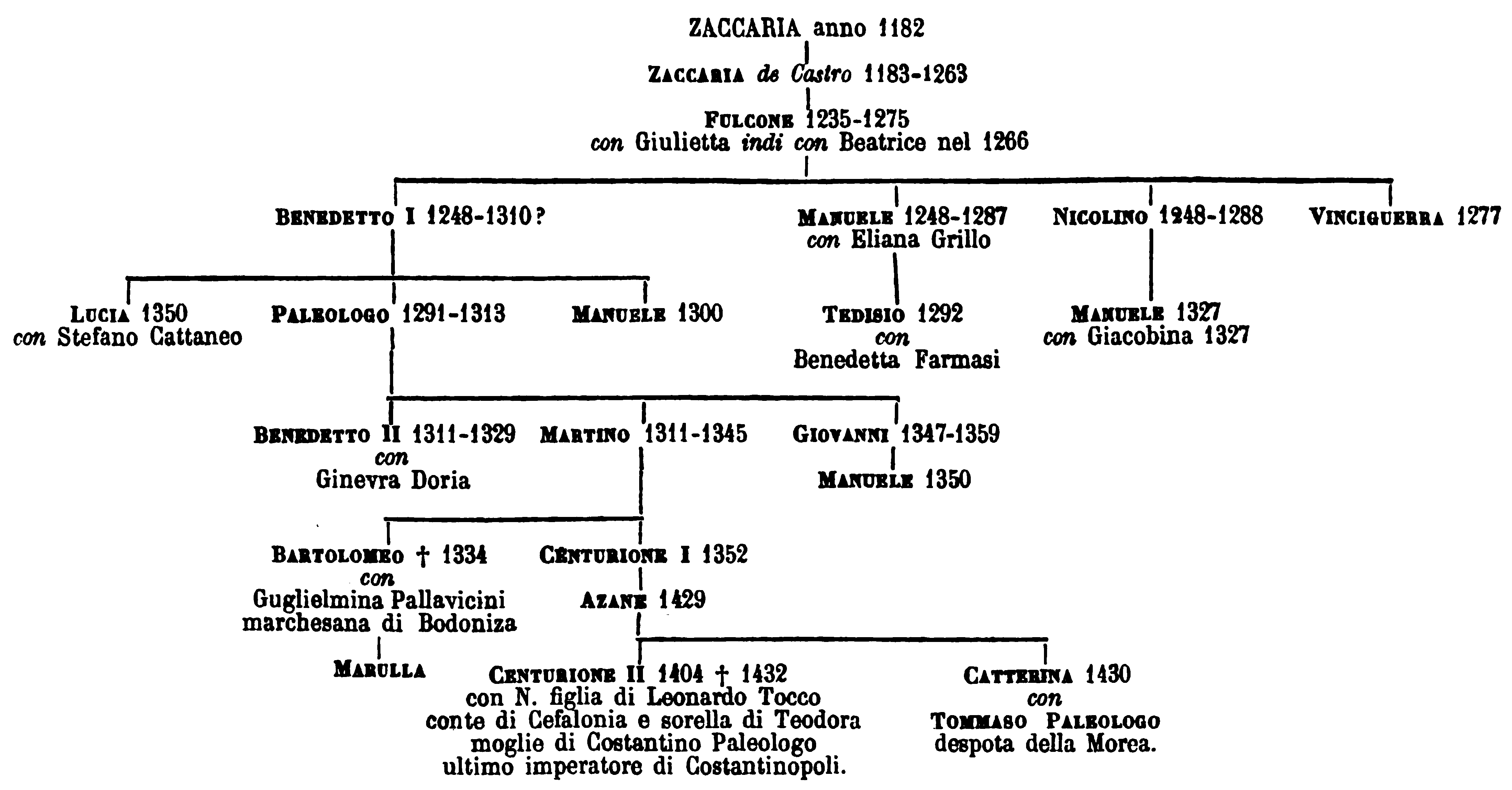
Family tree of the Zaccaria family in Latin Greece

Benedetto was the second son of Fulcone Zaccaria and one of his wives: Giulietta or Beatrice. Benedetto assisted his brothers Manuele and Nicolino, his nephew Tedisio, and his son Paleologo in their commercial enterprises.

Benedetto was captured by the Venetians in a battle off Tyre in 1258. In 1264, he was sent as a Genoese ambassador to the Byzantine court of Michael VIII Palaiologos. Although his mission was unsuccessful, his acquaintance with the emperor would stand him in good stead. After eleven years of negotiations which resulted in a renewed accord between the Empire and Genoa, Benedetto re-appeared in Constantinople with his brother Manuele in 1275. Benedetto married one of the emperor's sisters, while Manuele received control over the valuable alum mines of Phocaea. This was an extremely lucrative business, especially after Manuele acquired a near-monopoly after persuading Michael VIII to prohibit the import of alum from the Black Sea, even though this trade was also in the hands of Genoese merchants.

As an agent of the emperor, Benedetto acted as an ambassador to Peter III of Aragon in 1280–1282, and took part in the negotiations that led to the Byzantine–Aragonese alliance and the outbreak of the War of the Sicilian Vespers that ended the threat of an invasion of Byzantium by Charles I of Anjou.

Benedetto returned to Genoa in 1284 and was made an admiral. He was the principal commander of the Genoese fleet which defeated Pisa at the Battle of Meloria. He commanded a fleet of twenty galleys, separate from the main Genoese fleet and initially hidden from sight. His surprise attack led to a decisive Genoese victory and the permanent decline of Pisa's military and mercantile power.

He participated alongside the Castilians under Sancho IV in a victorious campaign against Morocco. At about the same time, he served Philip IV of France as an admiral, blocking the English and Flemish ports.

Before the Ottoman Turks and the Venetians, the Byzantine emperor Andronicus II Palaeologus appealed for his aid. In 1296, the Venetian admiral Ruggero Morosini razed Phocaea.

In 1302, Zaccaria was named admiral by Philip of France, in which capacity he conquered the island of Chios (1304), which had hitherto been in the hands of Moslem corsairs. At first, he gave the government of the island over to his nephew Tedisio. In 1304, he also occupied Samos and Cos, which were almost completely depopulated, and the emperor conceded him sovereignty over those islands and Chios for two years, under Byzantine suzerainty. It is from this date that Benedetto is accounted Lord of Chios and begins his career as a statesman and ruler. In 1306, Tedisio occupied Thasos, then a refuge for Greek pirates.

Zaccaria died in 1307 and his brother Manuele in 1309. His son Paleologo succeeded him in Chios and the rest of his possessions. Zaccaria's wife was an unnamed woman of some relation to the Palaeologi.

== Sources ==
- Miller, William (1921). "The Zaccaria of Phocaea and Chios (1275-1329)". Essays on the Latin Orient. Cambridge: Cambridge University Press. pp. 283–298.
- Nicol, Donald M. (1993) [1972]. The Last Centuries of Byzantium, 1261–1453 (Second ed.). Cambridge: Cambridge University Press. ISBN 978-0-521-43991-6.
- LOPEZ, Roberto S., Genova marinara nel Duecento. Benedetto Zaccaria ammiraglio e mercante, Messina-Milano, 1933.

New title	Lord of Chios; 1304–1307	Succeeded by Paleologo Zaccaria
Preceded by Manuele Zaccaria	Lord of Phocaea; 1287–1307	Succeeded by Nicolino Zaccaria
