= Benedetto II Zaccaria =

Benedetto II Zaccaria (died 1330) was the co-Lord of Chios, as well as many other Aegean islands from 1314 until c. 1325.

Benedetto II was the cousin of Paleologo Zaccaria, and succeeded him in Chios and other lands in the Aegean Sea together with his brother Martino. Sometime after 1325 the latter forced him to retire, in exchange for a pension. Benedetto asked for help from the Byzantine emperor, Andronikos III Palaiologos. In 1329, Martin was declared deposed and captured by an imperial fleet of 105 ships sent to Chios.

Benedetto was appointed as imperial prefect of the island. However, after he died childless, the island was annexed to the Byzantine Empire. Phocaea was recaptured by the Byzantines in 1334.

Benedetto married Ginevra Doria, daughter of Corrado Doria.

== Sources ==
- Miller, William (1921). "The Zaccaria of Phocaea and Chios (1275-1329)". Essays on the Latin Orient. Cambridge: Cambridge University Press. pp. 283–298. OCLC 457893641.
- Nicol, Donald M. (1993). The Last Centuries of Byzantium, 1261–1453 (Second ed.). Cambridge: Cambridge University Press. pp. 171–172. ISBN 978-0-521-43991-6.
- Setton, Kenneth M. (1976). The Papacy and the Levant (1204–1571), Volume I: The Thirteenth and Fourteenth Centuries. Philadelphia: The American Philosophical Society. ISBN 0-87169-114-0.

Preceded by Paleologo	Lord of Chios; 1314–ca. 1325 with Martino Zaccaria (1314–1329)	Succeeded by Martino Zaccaria
