= Phocaea =

Ancient Greek city in İzmir Province, Turkey

- Φώκαια (Greek) (in Greek); Foça (Turkish) (in Turkish)
- Phokaia
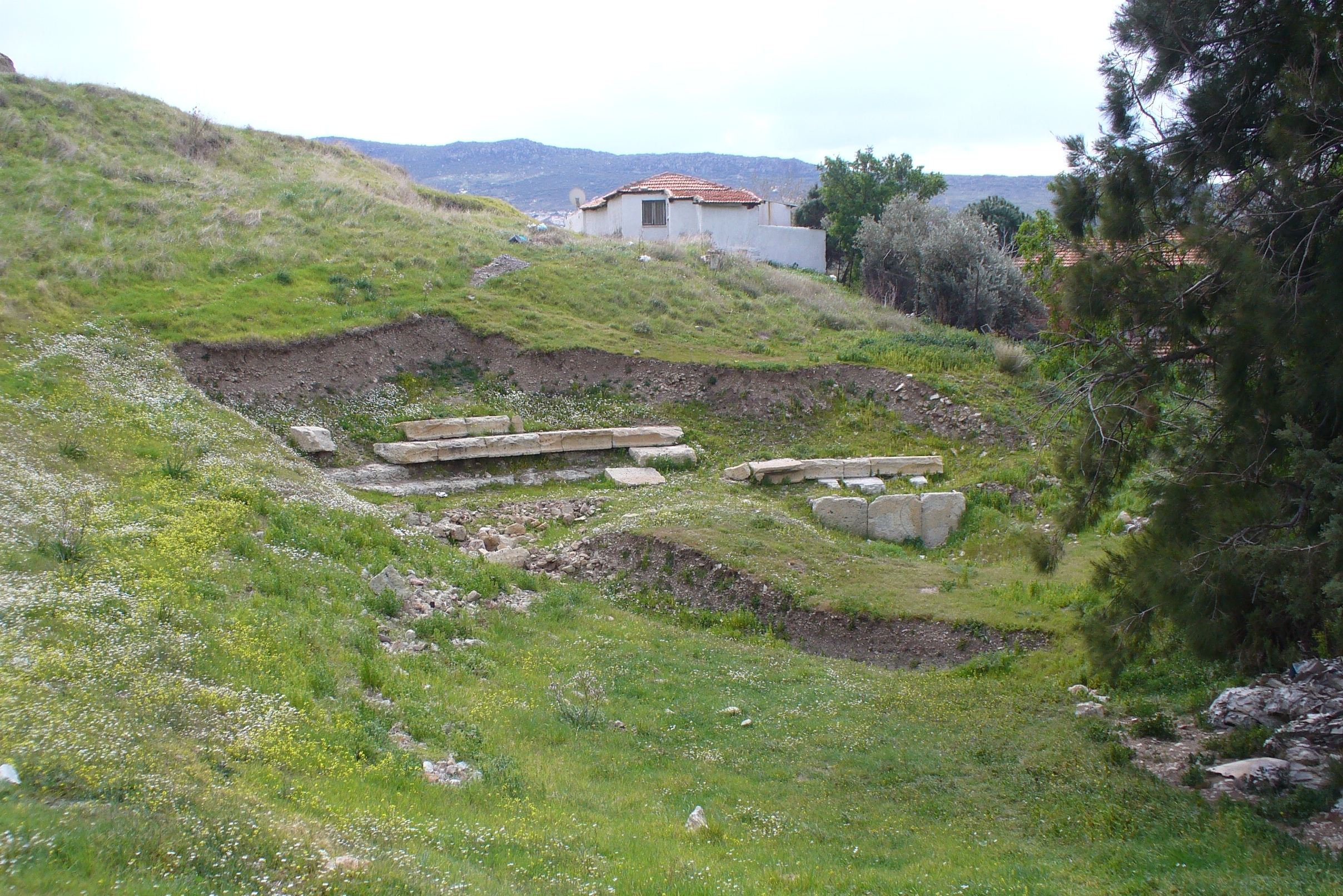
- The theatre of Phocaea

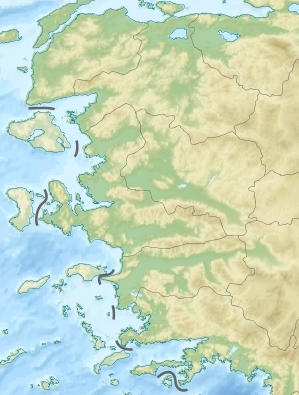
- Location within Western Turkey Location within Turkey
- 38°40′03″N 26°45′29″E
- Type: Settlement
- Location: Foça, İzmir Province, Turkey
- Region: Ionia

Phocaea or Phokaia (Ancient Greek: Φώκαια, Phókaia; modern-day Foça in Turkey) was an ancient Ionian Greek city on the western coast of Anatolia. Greek colonists from Phocaea founded the colony of Massalia (modern-day Marseille, in France) in 600 BC, Emporion (modern-day Empúries, in Catalonia, Spain) in 575 BC and Elea (modern-day Velia, in Campania, Italy) in 540 BC.

== Geography ==
Phocaea was the northernmost of the Ionian cities, on the boundary with Aeolis. It was located near the mouth of the river Hermus (now Gediz), and situated on the coast of the peninsula separating the Gulf of Cyme to the north, named for the largest of the Aeolian cities, and the Gulf of Smyrna (now İzmir) to the south.

Phocaea had two natural harbours within close range of the settlement, both containing a number of small islands. Phocaea's harbours allowed it to develop a thriving seafaring economy, and to become a great naval power, which greatly influenced its culture.

Recent archaeological surveys have shown that the city of Phocaea was large for the archaic period. Herodotus gives an idea of the size of Phocaea by describing the walls of Phocaea as having a length of several stadia.

A 4th century BC Persian tomb, known as Tas Kule (rock tower), stands (38°39′37″N 26°49′2″E) 7 km (4.3 mi) east of Phocaea along a main road. This funerary monument was carved out of solid rock with a lower 2.7 meters (8 ft 10 in) high rectangular story (9 by 6 meters (30 ft × 20 ft)) surmounted by a second 1.9 meters (6 ft 3 in) high story (3 by 3 meters (9.8 ft × 9.8 ft)). Four steps between the two levels suggest strong Persian influence and most archaeologists believe this tomb was built for a Persian aristocrat or local leader serving the Persians. Compare the style of the tomb of Cyrus.

== History ==
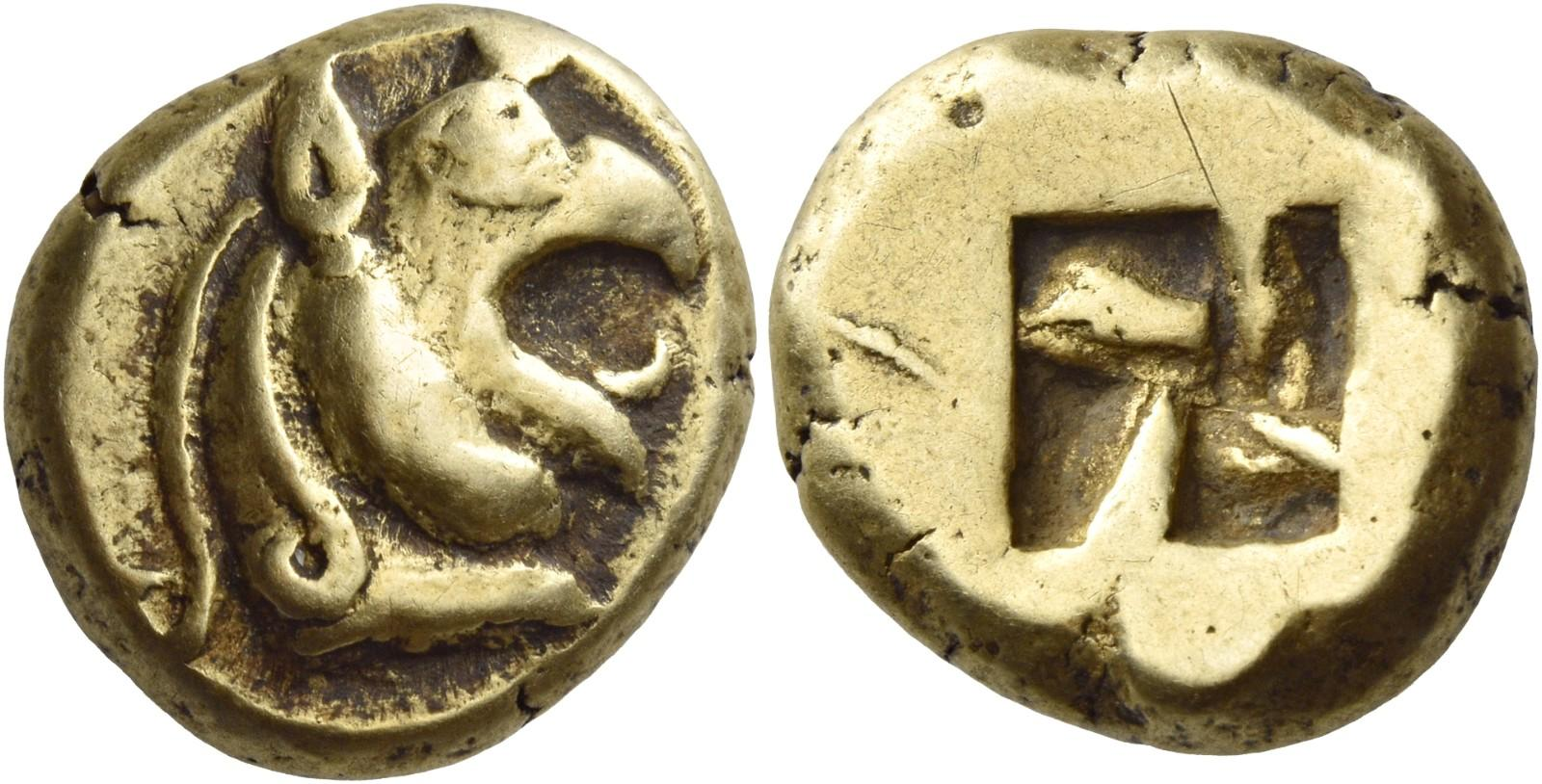
Stater coin from Phocaea with Griffin head; Circa 580 BC

The ancient Greek geographer Pausanias says that Phocaea was founded by Phocians under Athenian leadership, on land given to them by the Aeolian Cymaeans, and that they were admitted into the Ionian League after accepting as kings the line of Codrus. Pottery remains indicate Aeolian presence as late as the 9th century BC, and Ionian presence as early as the end of the 9th century BC. From this an approximate date of settlement for Phocaea can be inferred.

According to Herodotus the Phocaeans were the first Greeks to make long sea-voyages, having discovered the coasts of the Adriatic, Tyrrhenia and Spain. Herodotus relates that they so impressed Arganthonios, king of Tartessos in Spain, that he invited them to settle there, and, when they declined, gave them a great sum of money to build a wall around their city.

Their sea travel was extensive. To the south they probably conducted trade with the Greek colony of Naucratis in Egypt, which was the colony of their fellow Ionian city Miletus. To the north, they probably helped settle Amisos (Samsun) on the Black Sea, and Lampsacus at the north end of the Hellespont (now the Dardanelles). However, Phocaea's major colonies were to the west. These included Alalia in Corsica, Emporiae and Rhoda in Spain, and especially Massalia (Marseille) in France.

Phocaea remained independent until the reign of the Lydian king Croesus (circa 560–545 BC), when they, along with the rest of mainland Ionia, first, fell under Lydian control and then, along with Lydia (who had allied itself with Sparta) were conquered by Cyrus the Great of Persia in 546 BC, in one of the opening skirmishes of the great Greco-Persian conflict.

Rather than submit to Persian rule, the Phocaeans abandoned their city. Some may have fled to Chios, others to their colonies on Corsica and elsewhere in the Mediterranean, with some eventually returning to Phocaea. Many, however, became the founders of Elea, around 540 BC.

In 500 BC, Phocaea joined the Ionian Revolt against Persia. Indicative of its naval prowess, Dionysius, a Phocaean was chosen to command the Ionian fleet at the decisive Battle of Lade, in 494 BC. However, indicative of its declining fortunes, Phocaea was only able to contribute three ships, out of a total of "three hundred and fifty three". The Ionian fleet was defeated and the revolt ended shortly thereafter.

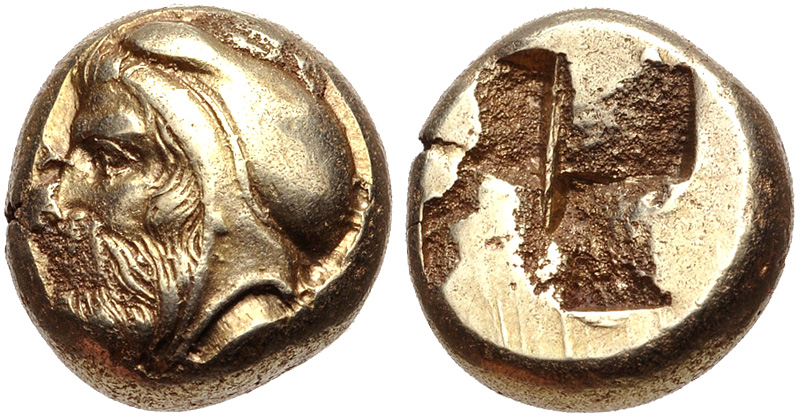
Coinage of Phokaia, Ionia, c. 478–387 BC. Possible portrait of Satrap Tissaphernes, with satrapal headress

After the defeat of Xerxes I by the Greeks in 480 BC and the subsequent rise of Athenian power, Phocaea joined the Delian League, paying tribute to Athens of two talents. In 412 BC, during the Peloponnesian War, with the help of Sparta, Phocaea rebelled along with the rest of Ionia. The Peace of Antalcidas, which ended the Corinthian War, returned nominal control to Persia in 387 BC.

In 343 BC, the Phocaeans unsuccessfully laid siege to Kydonia on the island of Crete.

During the Hellenistic period it fell under Seleucid, then Attalid rule. In the Roman period, the town was a manufacturing center for ceramic vessels, including the late Roman Phocaean red slip.

It was later under the control of Benedetto Zaccaria, the Genoese ambassador to Byzantium, who received the town as a hereditary lordship; Zaccaria and his descendants amassed a considerable fortune from his properties there, especially the rich alum mines. It remained a Genoese colony until it was taken by the Turks in 1455. It is a titular see of the Roman Catholic Church.

In 1914, Phocaea was the location of a massacre of ethnic Greek civilians by Turkish irregular bands.

== Coinage ==
Electrum coinage of Phocaea, 340–335 BC

Probably following the Lydians, the Phocaeans were among the earliest in the world to make and use coins as money. Its earliest coins were made of electrum, a naturally occurring alloy of silver and gold. The British Museum has a Phocaean coin containing the image of a seal dating from 600 to 550 BC.

== See also ==
- Cyme (Aeolis)
- 25 Phocaea, an asteroid named after the city
- List of ancient Greek cities
