= Chios =

Island in Greece

Chios Χίος
- Municipality
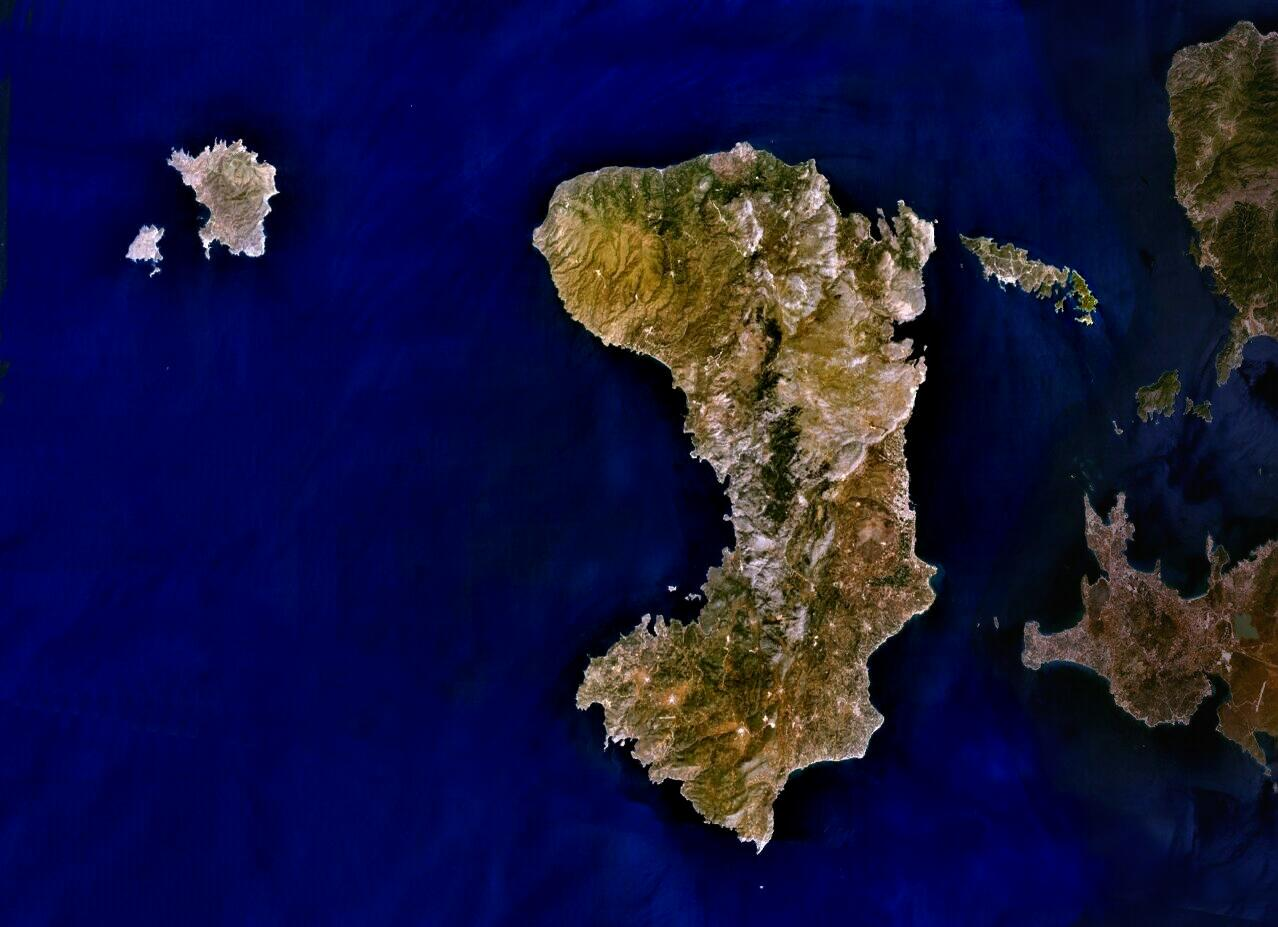

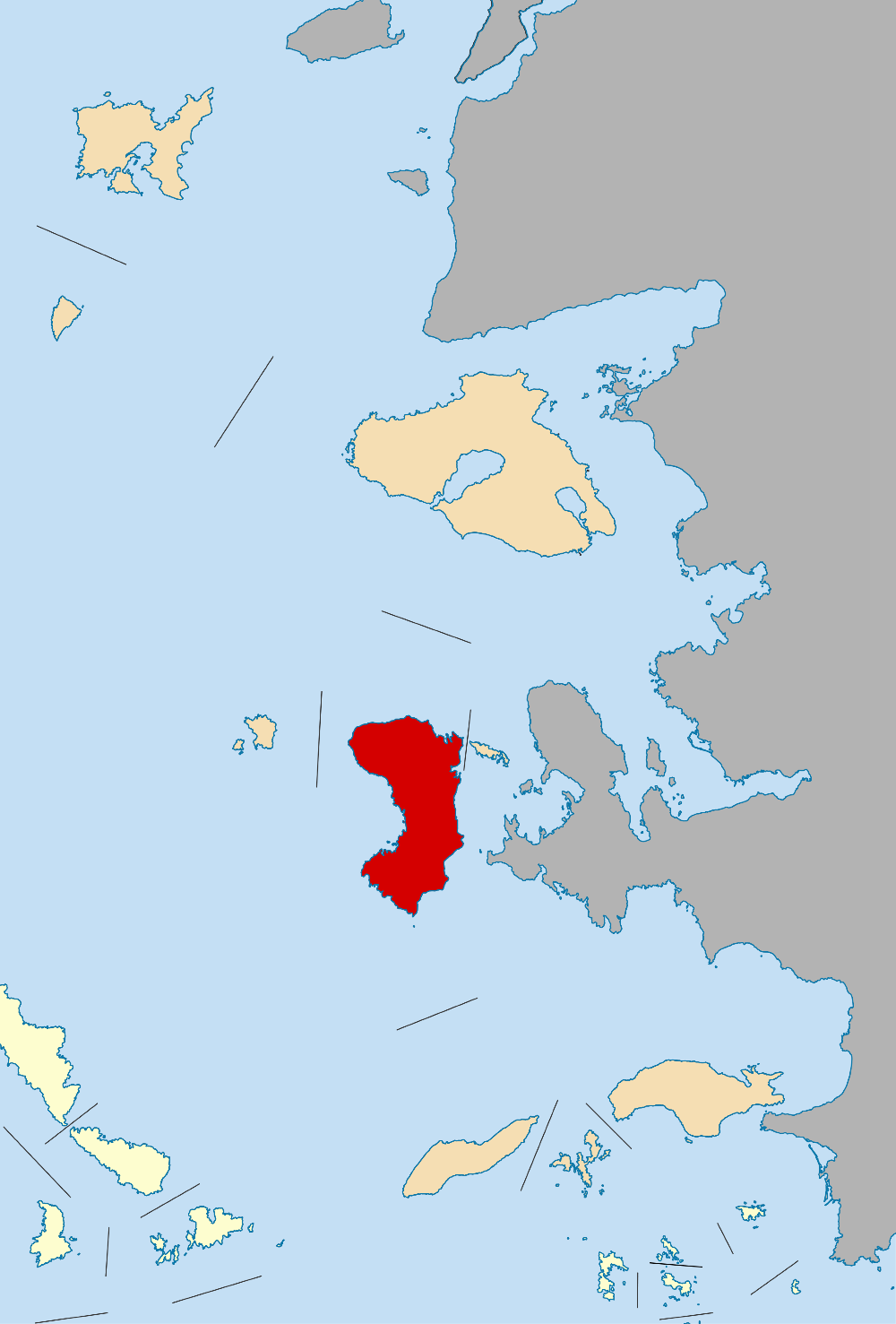

- Location within Greece
- Coordinates: 38°22′39″N 26°03′54″E
- Country: Greece
- Administrative region: North Aegean
- Regional unit: Chios
- Seat: Chios

Government
  - Mayor: Ioannis Malafis (since 2023)

Area
  - Municipality: 842.3 km^{2} (325.2 sq mi)
- Highest elevation: 1,297 m (4,255 ft)
- Lowest elevation: 0 m (0 ft)

Population (2021)
  - Municipality: 50,361
  - Density: 59.79/km^{2} (154.9/sq mi)
- Time zone: UTC+2 (EET)
  - Summer (DST): UTC+3 (EEST)
- Postal code: 82x xx
- Area code: 227x0
- Vehicle registration: ΧΙ
- Website: www.chios.gr

Chios (/ˈkaɪ.ɒs, ˈkaɪ.oʊs, ˈkiː-/; Greek: Χίος, romanized: Chíos [ˈçi.os]), also known as Scio in English, is the fifth largest Greek island, situated in the northern Aegean Sea, and the tenth largest island in the Mediterranean Sea. The island is separated from the Anatolian mainland by the Chios Strait. Chios is notable for its exports of mastic gum and its nickname is "the Mastic Island". Tourist attractions include its medieval villages and the 11th-century monastery of Nea Moni, a UNESCO World Heritage Site.

Administratively, the island forms a separate municipality within the Chios regional unit, which is part of the North Aegean region. The principal town of the island and seat of the municipality is Chios. Locals refer to Chios town as Chora (Χώρα literally means land or country, but usually refers to the capital or a settlement at the highest point of a Greek island).

The island was also the site of the Chios massacre, in which tens of thousands of Greeks on the island were massacred, expelled, and enslaved by Ottoman troops during the Greek War of Independence in 1822. Chios remained a part of the Ottoman Empire until 1912.

== Geography ==
Topographic map of Chios and Psara islands, situated in the Aegean Sea in Greece.

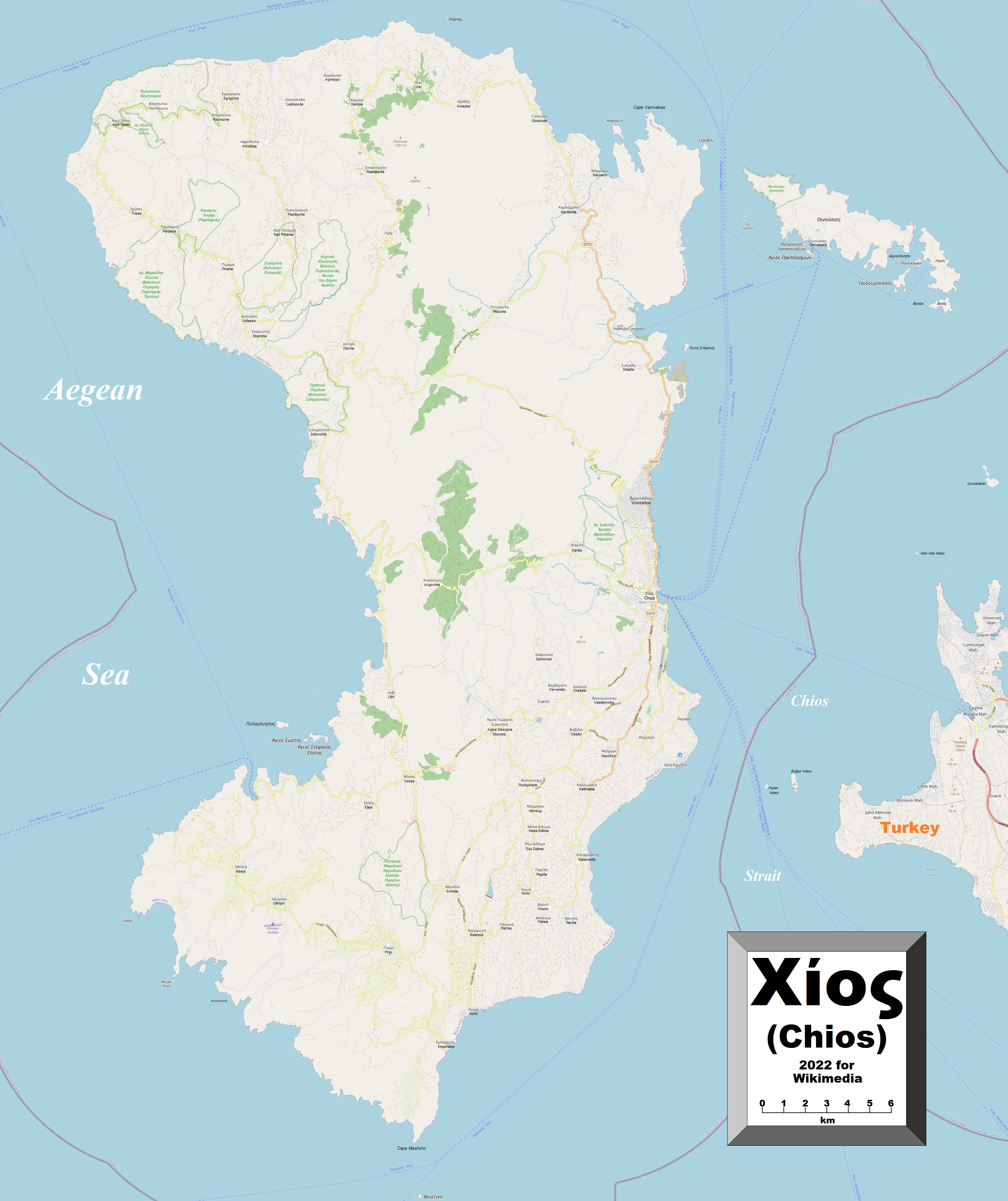
Detailed map of Chios

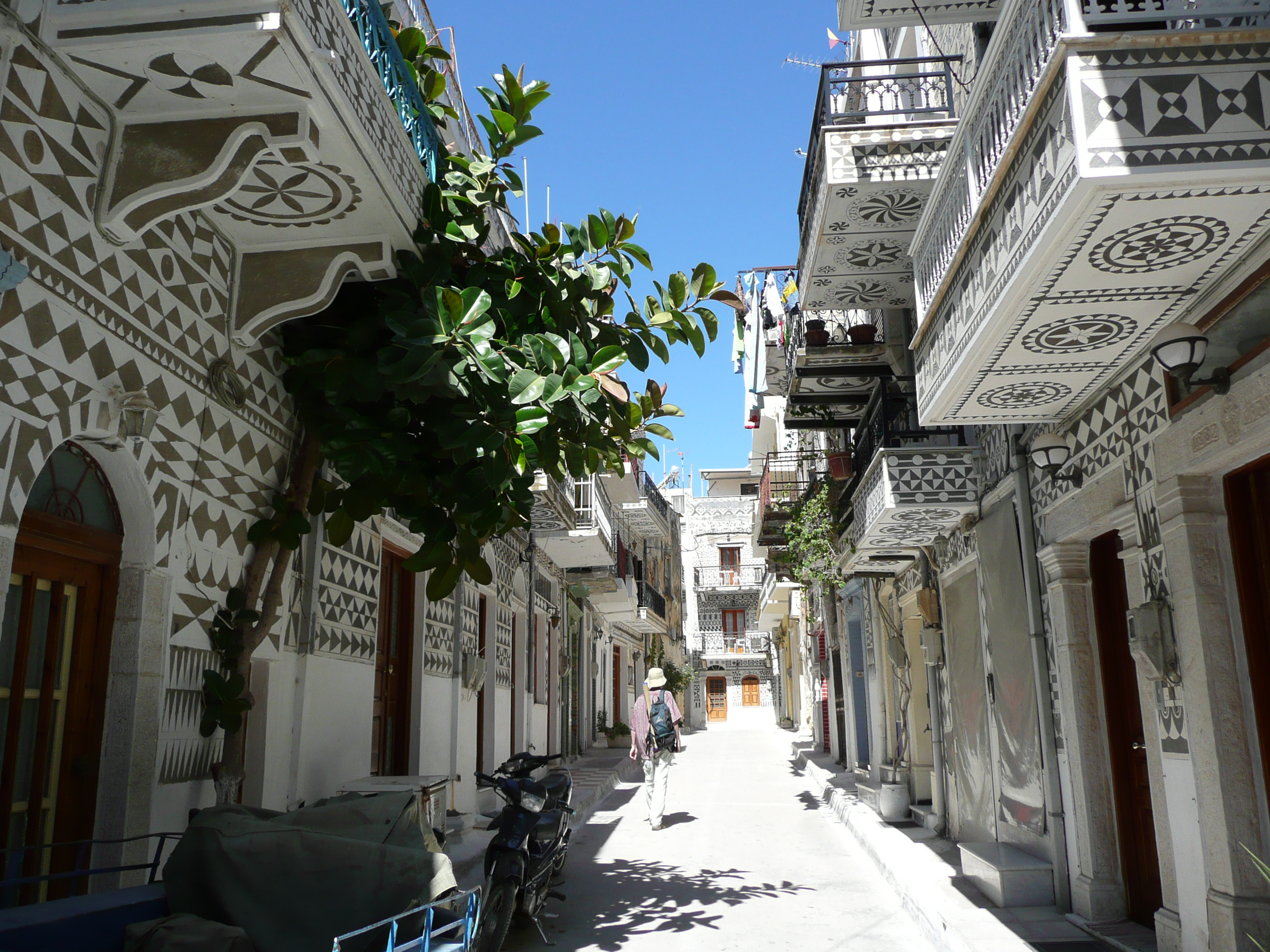
Buildings in Pyrgi covered with sgraffito (local name: Xistà)

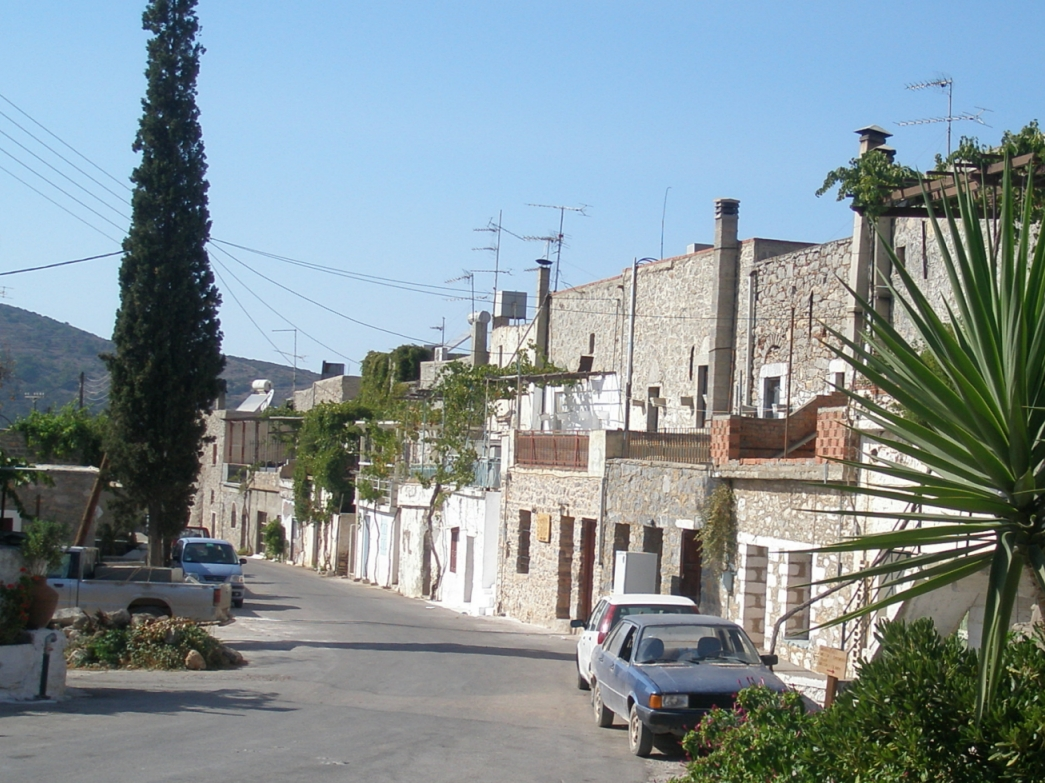
View of the village of Mesta

Chios island is crescent or kidney-shaped, 50 km (31 mi) long from north to south, and 29 km (18 mi) at its widest, covering an area of 842.289 km^{2} (325.210 sq mi). The terrain is mountainous and arid, with a ridge of mountains running the length of the island. The two largest of these mountains, Pelineon (1,297 m (4,255 ft)) and Epos (1,188 m (3,898 ft)), are situated in the north of the island. The center of the island is divided between east and west by a range of smaller peaks, known as Provatas.

=== Regions ===
Chios can be divided into five regions.

==== East coast ====
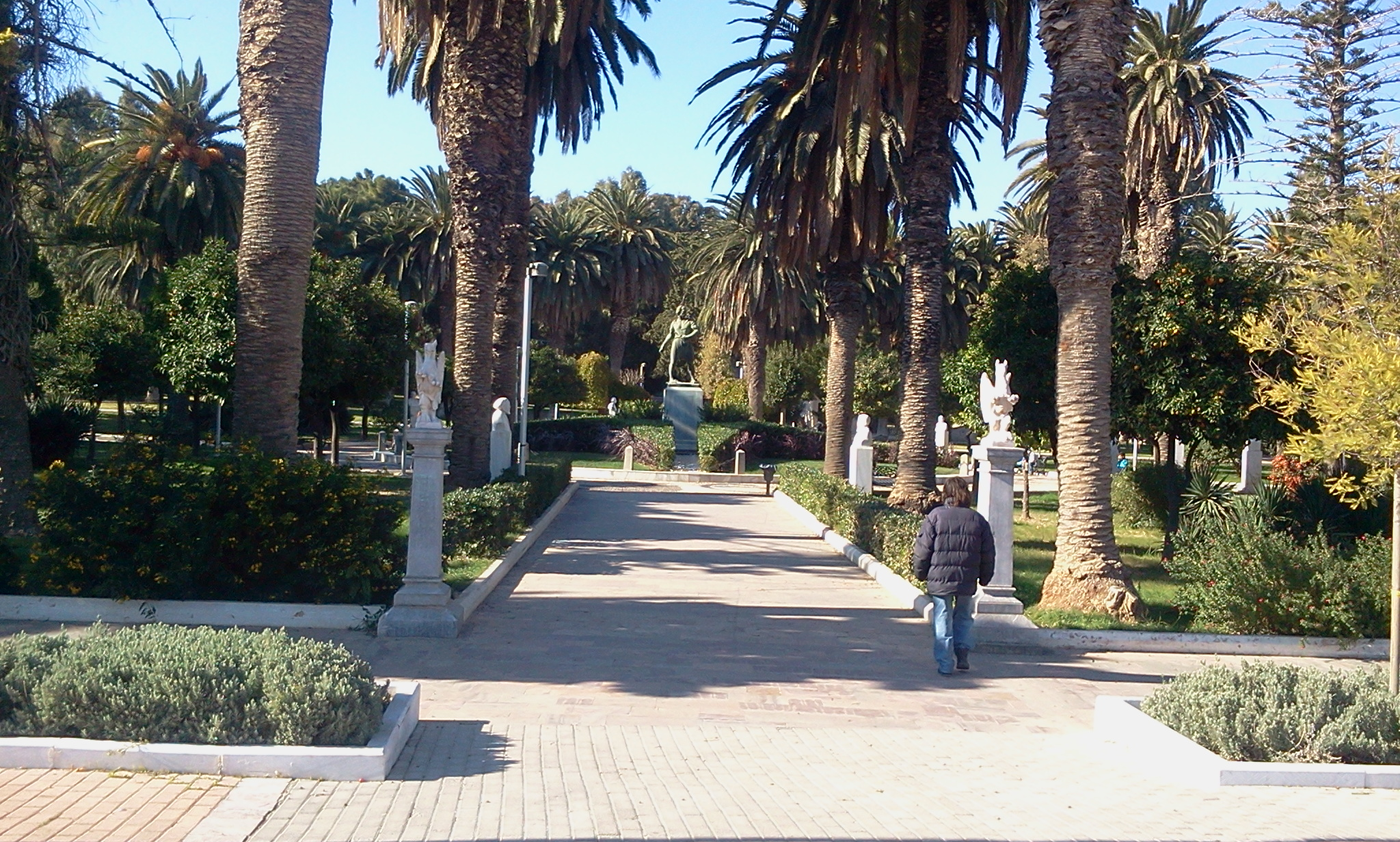
Chios Municipal Park, with a statue of Konstantinos Kanaris

Midway up the east coast lie the main population centers, the main town of Chios, and the regions of Vrontados and Kambos. Chios Town, with a population of 32,400, is built around the island's main harbour and medieval castle. The current castle, with a perimeter of 1,400 m (4,600 ft), was principally constructed during the time of Genoese and Ottoman rule, although remains have been found dating settlements there back to 2000 B.C. The town was substantially damaged by an earthquake in 1881, and only partially retains its original character.

North of Chios Town lies the large suburb of Vrontados (population 4,500), which claims to be the birthplace of Homer. The suburb lies in the Omiroupoli municipality, and its connection to the poet is supported by an archaeological site known traditionally as "Teacher's Rock".

==== Southern region (Mastichochória) ====
In the southern region of the island are the Mastichochoria (literally 'mastic villages'), the seven villages of Mesta (Μεστά), Pyrgi (Πυργί), Olympi (Ολύμποι), Kalamoti (Καλαμωτή), Vessa (Βέσσα), Lithi (Λιθί), and Elata (Ελάτα), which together have controlled the production of mastic gum in the area since the Roman period. The villages, built between the 14th and 16th centuries, have a carefully designed layout with fortified gates and narrow streets to protect against the frequent raids by marauding pirates. Between Chios Town and the Mastichochoria lie a large number of historic villages including Armolia (Αρμόλια), Myrmighi (Μυρμήγκι), and Kalimassia (Καλλιμασιά). Along the east coast are the fishing villages of Kataraktis (Καταρράκτης) and to the south, Nenita (Νένητα).

==== Interior ====
Directly in the centre of the island, between the villages of Avgonyma to the west and Karyes to the east, is the 11th century monastery of Nea Moni, a UNESCO World Heritage Site. The monastery was built with funds given by the Byzantine Emperor Constantine IX, after three monks, living in caves nearby, had petitioned him while he was in exile on the island of Lesbos. The monastery had substantial estates attached, with a thriving community until the massacre of 1822. It was further damaged during the 1881 earthquake. In 1952, due to the shortage of monks, Nea Moni was converted to a convent.

=== Climate ===
The island's climate is warm and moderate, categorised as temperate, Mediterranean (Köppen: Csa), with modest variation due to the stabilising effect of the surrounding sea. Average temperatures normally range from a summer high of 30 °C (86 °F) to a winter low of 7 °C (45 °F) in January, although temperatures of over 40 °C (104 °F) or below freezing can sometimes be encountered.

The island normally experiences steady breezes (average 3–5 m/s (6.7–11.2 mph)) throughout the year, with wind direction predominantly northerly ("Etesian" Wind—locally called the "Meltemi") or southwesterly (Sirocco).

Climate data for Chios town (23m)
Month	Jan	Feb	Mar	Apr	May	Jun	Jul	Aug	Sep	Oct	Nov	Dec	Year
Mean daily maximum °C (°F)	12.8 (55.0)	13 (55)	17.3 (63.1)	19.4 (66.9)	24.5 (76.1)	29.4 (84.9)	32 (90)	32.4 (90.3)	28.6 (83.5)	24.4 (75.9)	19.6 (67.3)	16.1 (61.0)	22.5 (72.4)
Mean daily minimum °C (°F)	7.2 (45.0)	8 (46)	10 (50)	11.8 (53.2)	15.5 (59.9)	20.9 (69.6)	23.3 (73.9)	24 (75)	20.5 (68.9)	16.6 (61.9)	13.4 (56.1)	10.7 (51.3)	15.2 (59.2)
Average precipitation mm (inches)	139.6 (5.50)	94.4 (3.72)	41.8 (1.65)	61.2 (2.41)	27.6 (1.09)	10.9 (0.43)	0.1 (0.00)	0 (0)	3.6 (0.14)	23.2 (0.91)	88.2 (3.47)	178 (7.0)	668.6 (26.32)
Source: (2019 – 2020 averages)

=== Geology ===
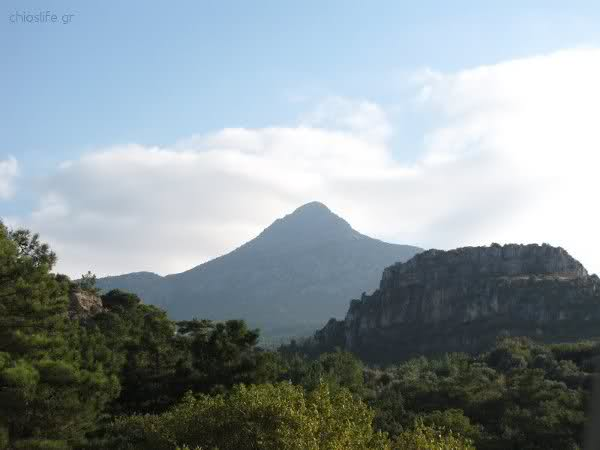
Mount Pelinaio

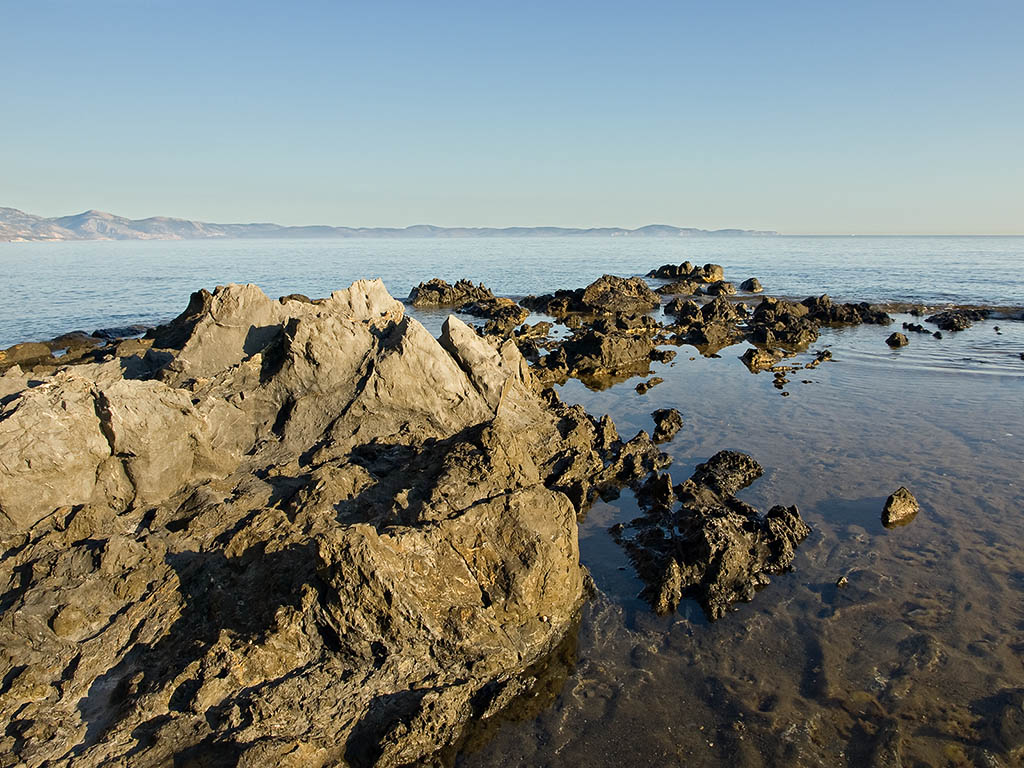
Rock of Saint Markella, patron saint of Chios

The Chios Basin is a hydrographic sub-unit of the Aegean Sea adjacent to the island of Chios. A kind of white dirt found near Pyrgi on the southern part of the island was famed as an astringent and cosmetic since antiquity as Chian earth (Latin: Chia terra; Greek: πηλομαιοτικο, pēlomaiotiko). Extracted around May each year, it was considered less valuable than the similar medicinal earth produced by Lemnos given that the Limnian earth was considered protective against venoms and poisons but nonetheless reputed to be "the greatest of all cosmetics... giv[ing] a whiteness and smoothness to the skin and prevent[ing] wrinkles beyond any of the other substances... for the same purposes."

== History ==
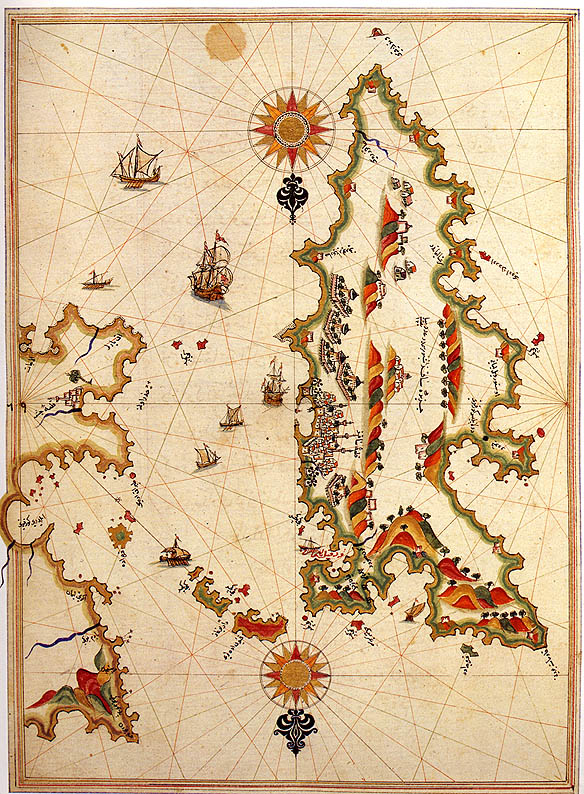
16th-century detailed map of Chios by Piri Reis

=== Etymology ===
The ancient writer Pausanias tells us that the poet Ion of Chios believed the island received its name from Chios, the son of Poseidon by a nymph of the island, who was born amidst snowfall (Ancient Greek: χιών chiōn 'snow'). Other ancient authors attributed the name to a nymph called Chione. Known as Ophioussa (Ὀφιοῦσσα, 'snake island') and Pityoussa (Πιτυοῦσσα, 'pine-tree island') in antiquity, during the later Middle Ages the island was ruled by a number of non-Greek powers and was known as Scio (Genoese), Chio (Italian) and Sakız (صاقيز in Ottoman Turkish). The capital during that time was Kastron (Κάστρον, 'castle').

=== Prehistoric period ===
Archaeological research on Chios has found evidence of habitation dating back at least to the Neolithic era. The primary sites of research for this period have been cave dwellings at Hagio(n) Galas in the north and a settlement and accompanying necropolis in modern-day Emporeio (also known as Emporio) at the far south of the island. Scholars lack information on this period. The size and duration of these settlements have therefore not been well-established.

The British School at Athens under the direction of Sinclair Hood excavated the Emporeio site in 1952–1955, and most current information comes from these digs. The Greek Archaeological Service has also been excavating periodically on Chios since 1970, though much of its work on the island remains unpublished.

The noticeable uniformity in the size of houses at Emporeio leads some scholars to believe that there may have been little social distinction during the Neolithic era on the island. The inhabitants apparently all benefited from agricultural and livestock farming.

It is also widely held by scholars that the island was not occupied by humans during the Middle Bronze Age (2300–1600), though researchers have recently suggested that the lack of evidence from this period may only demonstrate the lack of excavations on Chios and the northern Aegean.

By at least the 11th century BC the island was ruled by a monarchy, and the subsequent transition to aristocratic (or possibly tyrannic) rule occurred sometime over the next four centuries. Future excavations may reveal more information about this period. 9th-century Euboean and Cypriote presence on the island is attested by ceramics, while a Phoenician presence is noted at Erythrae, the traditional competitor of Chios on the mainland.

=== Archaic and Classical periods ===
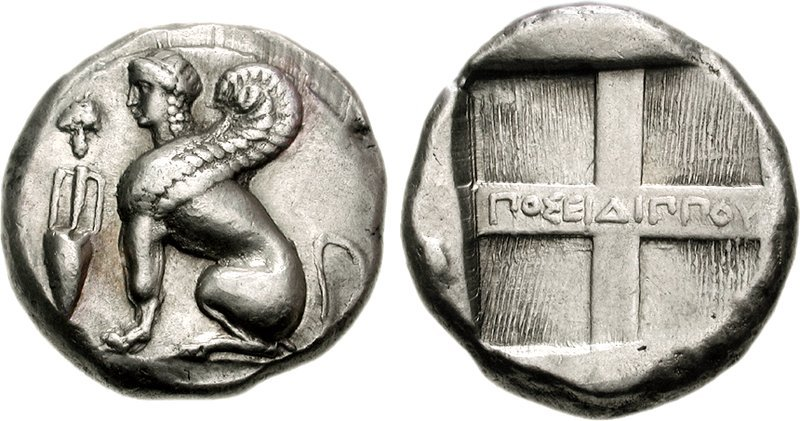
Tetradrachm from Chios, c. 380–350 BC

Pherecydes, native to the Aegean, wrote that the island was occupied by the Leleges, Pre-Greeks who were reported to be subjected to the Minoans on Crete. They were eventually driven out by invading Ionians.

Chios was one of the original twelve member states of the Ionian League. As a result, Chios, at the end of the 7th century BC, was one of the first cities to strike or mint coins, establishing the sphinx as its symbol. It maintained this tradition for almost 900 years.

In the 6th century BC, Chios' government adopted a constitution similar to that developed by Solon in Athens and later developed democratic elements with a voting assembly and people's magistrates called damarchoi.

In 546 BC, Chios was subjected to the Persian Empire. Chios joined the Ionian Revolt against the Persians in 499 BC. The naval power of Chios during this period is demonstrated by the fact that the Chians had the largest fleet (100 ships) of all of the Ionians at the Battle of Lade in 494 BC. At Lade, the Chian fleet doggedly continued to fight the Persian fleet even after the defection of the Samians and others, but the Chians were ultimately forced to retreat and were again subjected to Persian domination.

The defeat of Persia at the Battle of Mycale in 479 BC meant the liberation of Chios from Persian rule. When the Athenians formed the Delian League, which included Ionia, Chios joined as one of the few members who did not have to pay tribute but who supplied ships to the alliance.

By the fifth to fourth centuries BC, the island had grown to an estimated population of over 120,000 (two to three times the estimated population in 2005), based on the huge necropolis at the main city of Chios. It is thought that the majority of the population lived in that area.

In 412 BC, during the Peloponnesian War, Chios revolted against Athens, and the Athenians besieged it. Relief only came the following year when the Spartans were able to raise the siege. In the 4th century BC, Chios was a member of the Second Athenian League but revolted against Athens during the Social War (357–355 BC), and Chios became independent again until the rise of Macedonia.

=== Hellenistic period ===
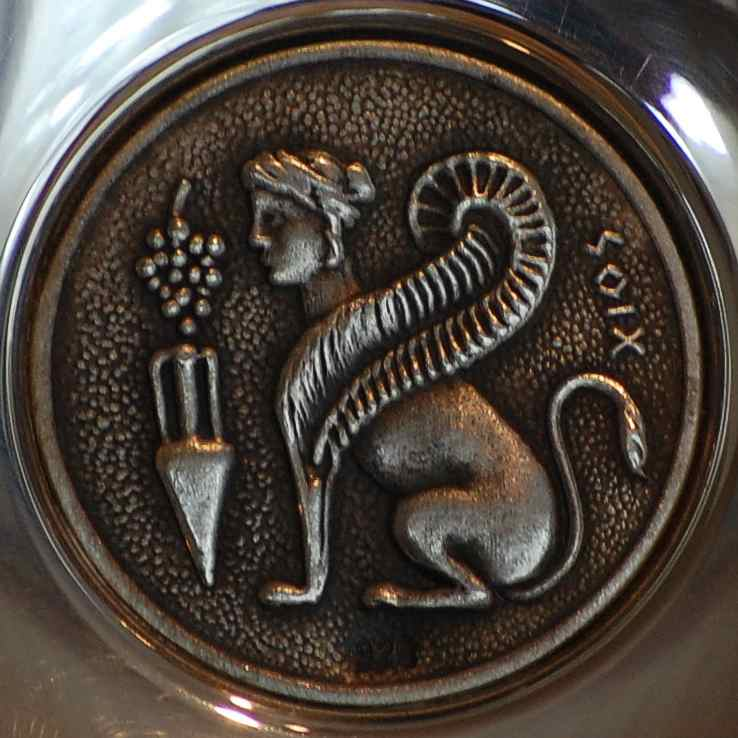
Reproduction of Sphinx (emblem of Chios).

Theopompus returned to Chios with the other exiles in 333 BC after Alexander the Great had invaded Asia Minor and decreed their return, as well as the exile or trial of Persian supporters on the island. Theopompus was exiled again sometime after Alexander's death and took refuge in Egypt.

During this period, the island also had become the largest exporter of Greek wine, which was noted for being of relatively high quality (see "Chian wine"). Chian amphoras, with a characteristic sphinx emblem and bunches of grapes, have been found in nearly every country with whom the ancient Greeks traded. These countries included Gaul, Upper Egypt, and Southern Russia.

=== Roman period ===
During the Third Macedonian War, thirty-five vessels allied to Rome, carrying about 1,000 Galatian troops, as well as a number of horses, were sent by Eumenes II to his brother Attalus. Leaving from Elaea, they were headed to the harbour of Phanae, planning to disembark from there to Macedonia. However, Perseus's naval commander Antenor intercepted the fleet between Erythrae (on the Western coast of Turkey) and Chios. According to Livy, they were caught completely off-guard by Antenor. Eumenes' officers at first thought the intercepting fleet were friendly Romans, but scattered upon realizing they were facing an attack by their Macedonian enemy, some choosing to abandon ship and swim to Erythrae. Others, crashing their ships into land on Chios, fled toward the city. The Chians however closed their gates, startled at the calamity. And the Macedonians, who had docked closer to the city anyway, cut the rest of the fleet off outside the city gates, and on the road leading to the city. Of the 1,000 men, 800 were killed, 200 taken prisoner.'

After the Roman conquest Chios became part of the province of Asia.

In the spring of 14 BC, King Herod of Judaea, known for his extensive architectural projects, funded the construction of a stoa on Chios, which had suffered destruction during the Mithridatic War. Additionally, he settled the outstanding taxes owed by the people of Chios to the Romans.

Pliny remarks upon the islanders' use of variegated marble in their buildings, their appreciation for such stone above murals or other forms of artificial decoration, and the cosmetic properties of the local earth. The marble from Chios, called marmor chium or "portasanta" today, became one of the most desirable and expensive in the Roman world and later. It has a pinkish coloured background containing yellow-orange, brown and grey spots of variable shape and size, separated by whitish or red veins. The name "portasanta" derives from the door jambs of St. Peter's Basilica, Rome, being made of this marble.

According to the Acts of the Apostles, Luke the Evangelist, Paul the Apostle and their companions passed Chios during Paul's third missionary journey, on a passage from Lesbos to Samos.

=== Byzantine period ===
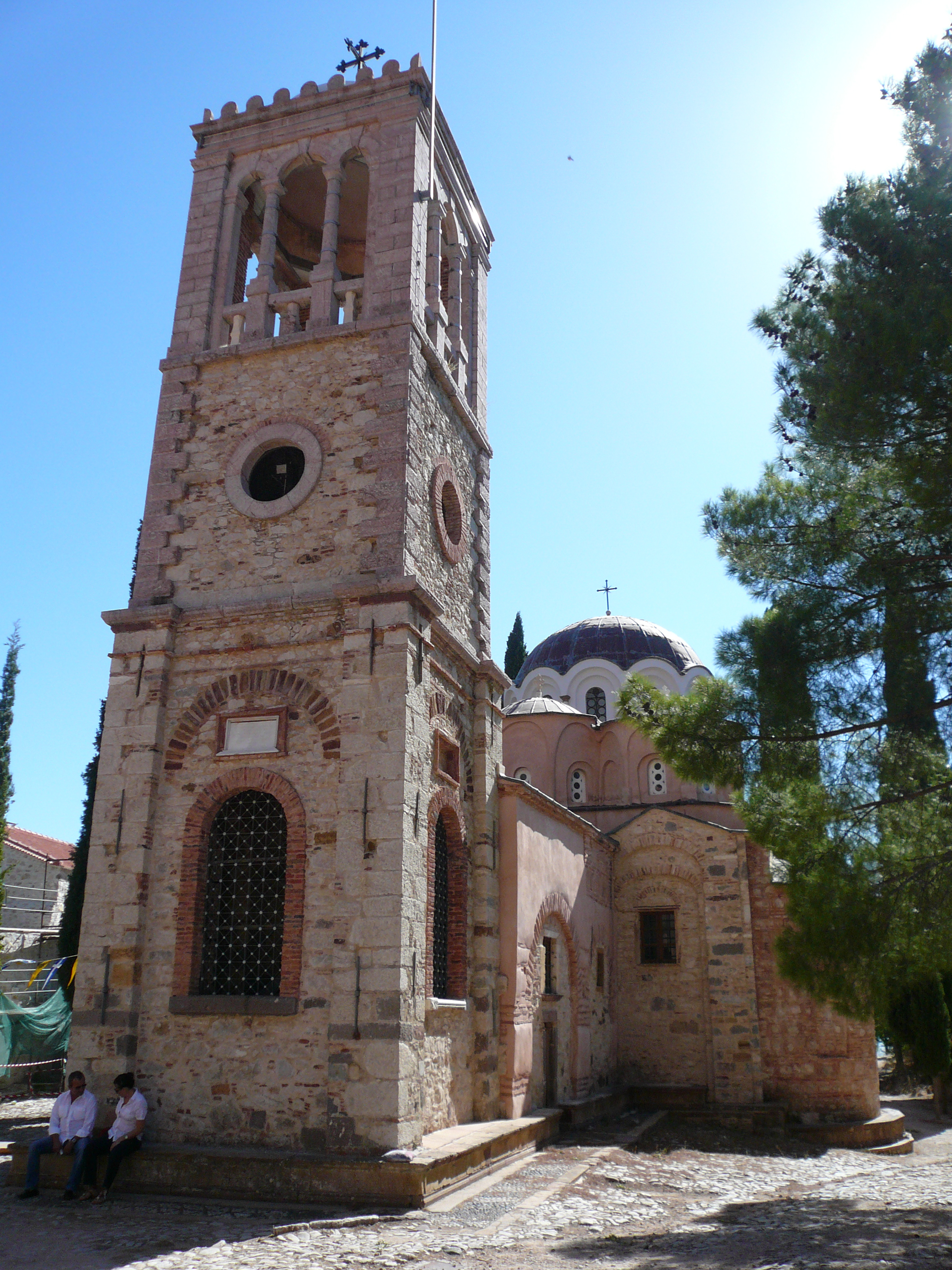
Nea Moni of Chios (11th century)

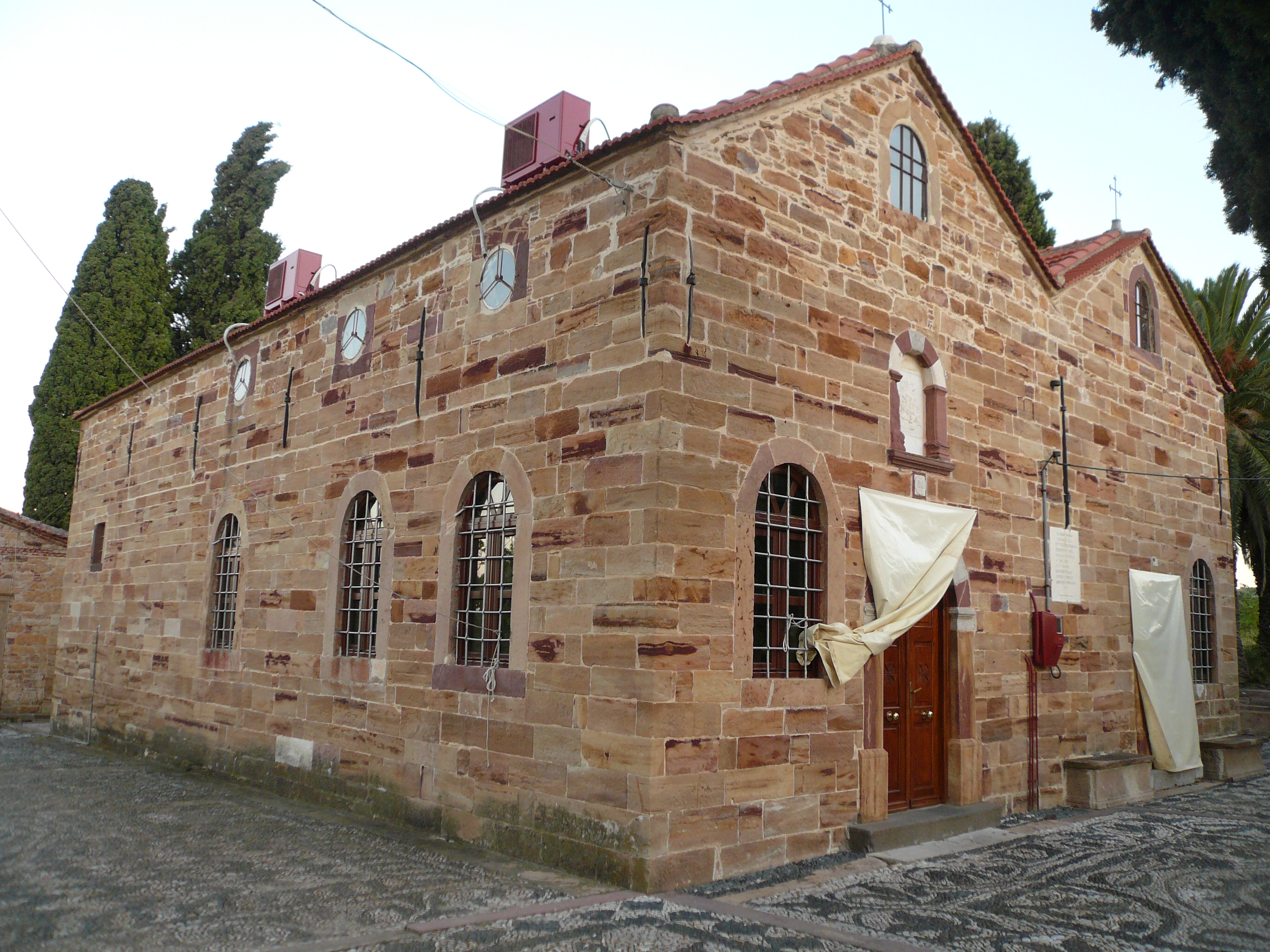
Byzantine Panagia Kokorovilia Church (13th century) in Kampos

After the permanent division of the Roman Empire in 395 AD, Chios was for seven centuries part of the Byzantine Empire. This came to an end when the island was briefly held (1090–97) by Tzachas, a Turkish bey in the region of Smyrna during the first expansion of the Turks to the Aegean coast. However, the Turks were driven back from the Aegean coast by the Byzantines aided by the First Crusade, and the island was restored to Byzantine rule by admiral Constantine Dalassenos.

This relative stability was ended by the sacking of Constantinople by the Fourth Crusade (1204) and during the turmoil of the 13th century the island's ownership was constantly affected by the regional power struggles. After the Fourth Crusade, the Byzantine empire was divided up by the Latin emperors of Constantinople, with Chios nominally becoming a possession of the Republic of Venice. However, defeats for the Latin empire resulted in the island reverting to Byzantine rule in 1225.

=== Genoese period (1304–1566) ===
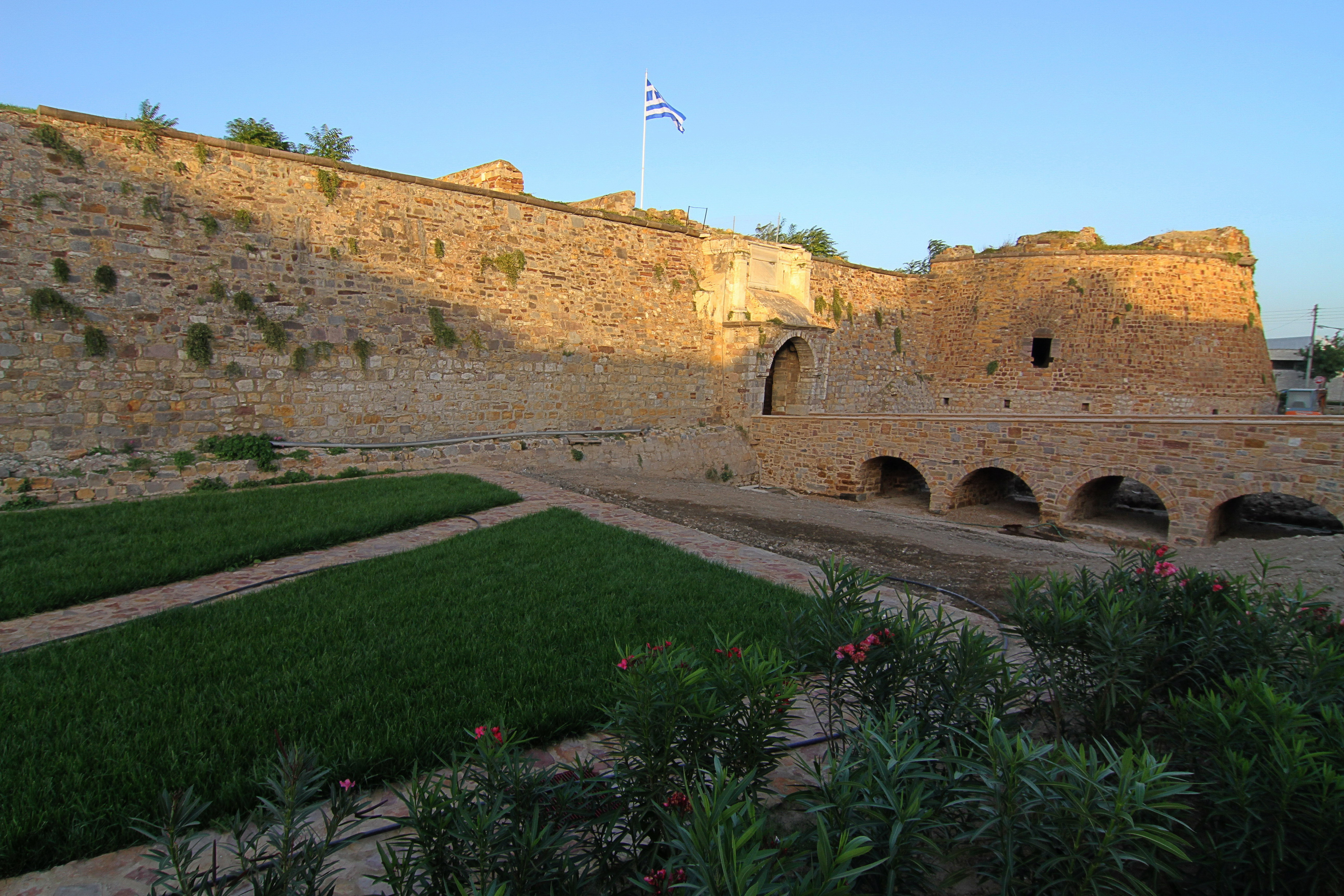
Castle of Chios

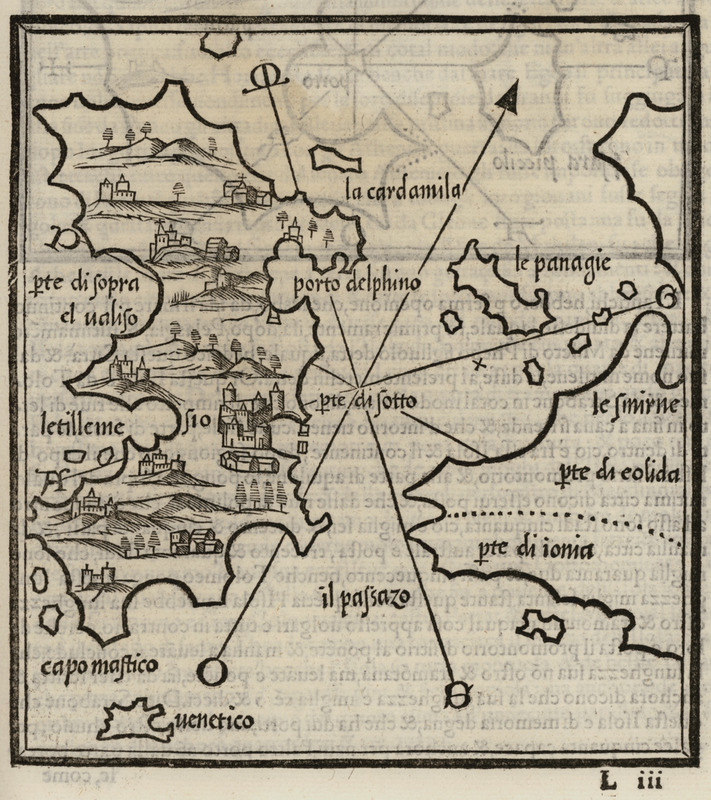
Chios map by Benedetto Bordone, 1547

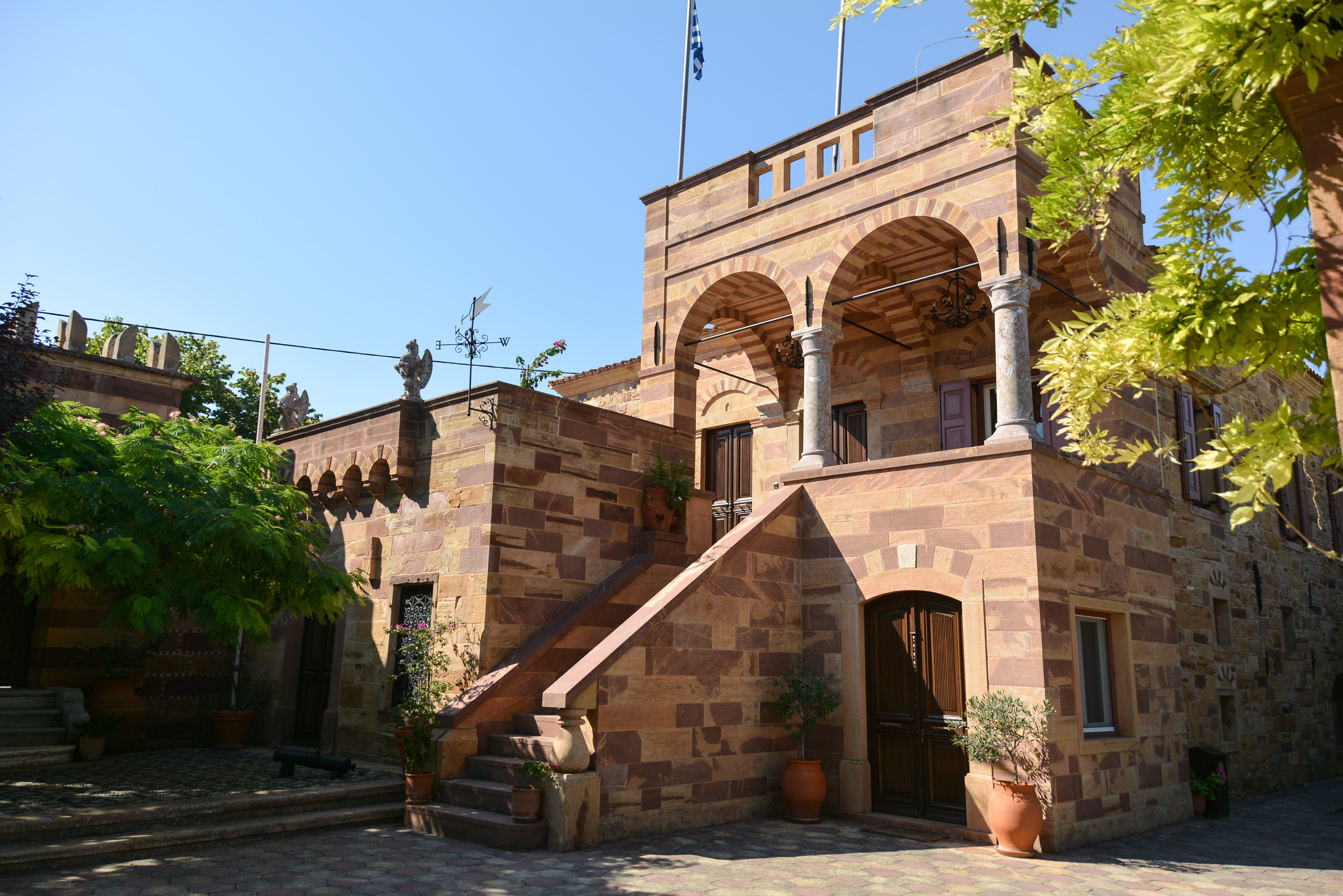
Building in Kampos

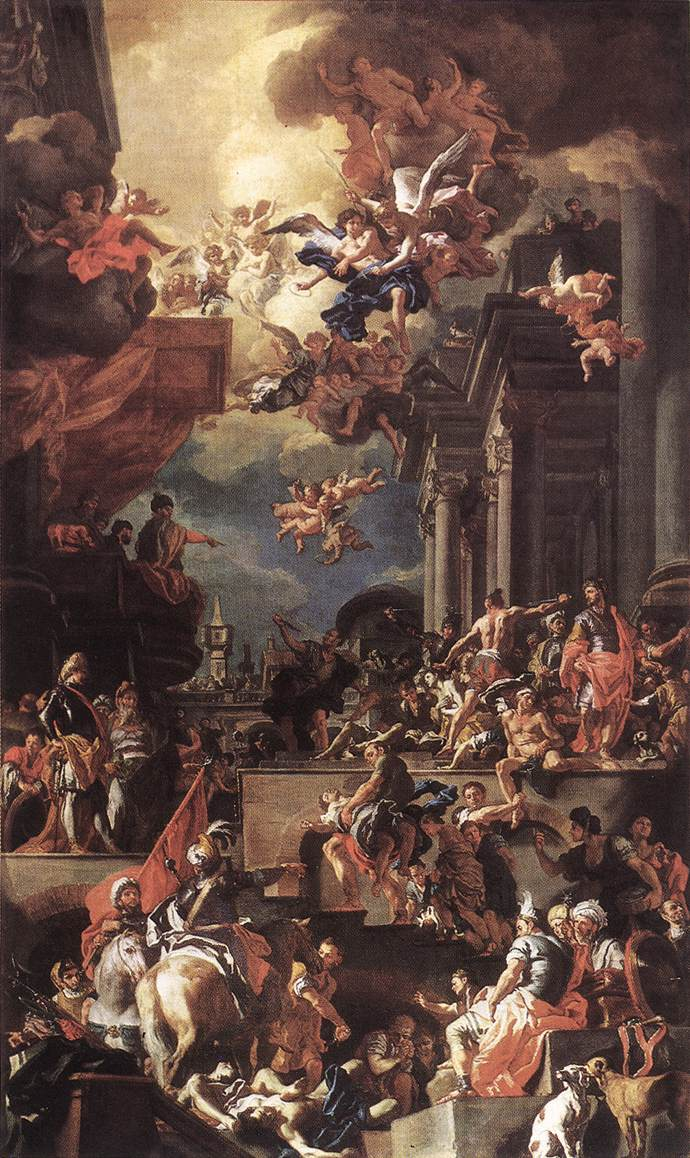
The Massacre of the Giustiniani at Chios by Francesco Solimena

The Byzantine rulers had little influence and through the Treaty of Nymphaeum, authority was ceded to the Republic of Genoa (1261). At this time the island was frequently attacked by pirates, and by 1302–1303 was a target for the renewed Turkish fleets. To prevent Turkish expansion, the island was reconquered and kept as a renewable concession, at the behest of the Byzantine emperor Andronicus II Palaeologus, by the Genovese Benedetto I Zaccaria (1304), then admiral to Philip of France. Zaccaria installed himself as ruler of the island, founding the short-lived Lordship of Chios. His rule was benign and effective control remained in the hands of the local Greek landowners. Benedetto Zacharia was followed by his son Paleologo and then his grandsons or nephews Benedetto II and Martino. They attempted to turn the island towards the Latin and Papal powers, and away from the predominant Byzantine influence. The locals, still loyal to the Byzantine Empire, responded to a letter from the emperor and, despite a standing army of a thousand infantrymen, a hundred cavalrymen and two galleys, expelled the Zacharia family from the island (1329) and dissolved the fiefdom.

Local rule was brief. In 1346, a chartered company or Maona (the "Maona di Chio e di Focea") was set up in Genoa to reconquer and exploit Chios and the neighbouring town of Phocaea in Asia Minor. Although the islanders firmly rejected an initial offer of protection, the island was invaded by a Genoese fleet, led by Simone Vignoso, and the castle besieged. Again rule was transferred peacefully, as on 12 September the castle was surrendered and a treaty signed with no loss of privileges to the local landowners as long as the new authority was accepted. The Maona was controlled by the Giustiniani family.

The Genoese, being interested in profit rather than conquest, controlled the trade-posts and warehouses, in particular the trade of mastic, alum, salt and pitch. Other trades such as grain, wine oil and cloth and most professions were run jointly with the locals. After a failed uprising in 1347, and being heavily outnumbered (less than 10% of the population in 1395), the Latins maintained light control over the local population, remaining largely in the town and allowing full religious freedom. In this way the island remained under Genoese control for two centuries. A notable Genoese inhabitant from this period was Christopher Columbus who lived in Chios in the 1470s before his voyages to the Americas. In 1566, when Genoa lost Chios to the Ottoman Empire, there were 12,000 Greeks and 2,500 Genoese (or 17% of the total population) in the island.

=== Ottoman period: economic prosperity and the Great Destruction ===
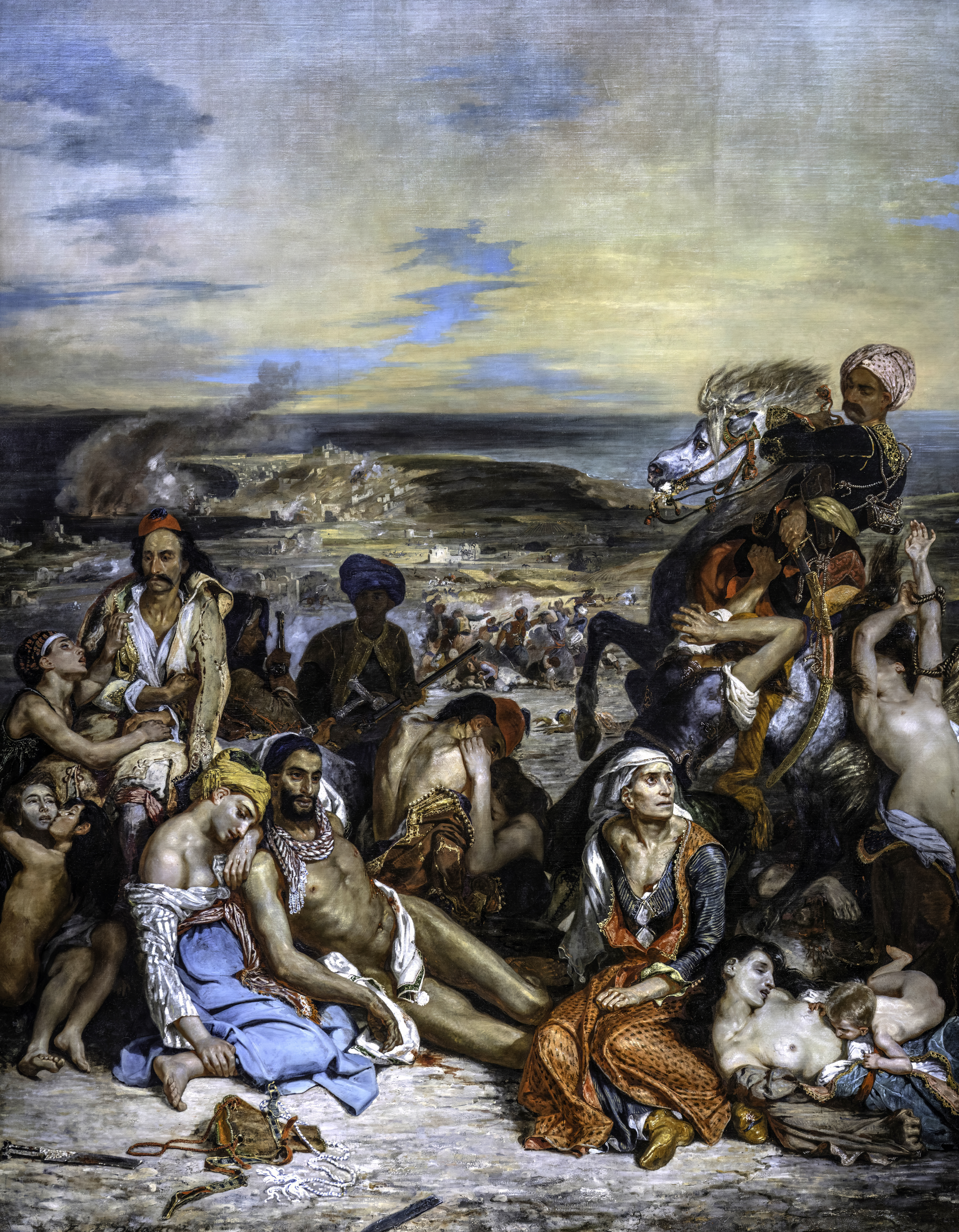
The Massacre at Chios by Eugène Delacroix. This, and the works of Lord Byron, did much to draw the attention of mainland Europe to the catastrophe that had taken place in Chios (1824, oil on canvas, 419 cm × 354 cm (165 in × 139 in), Musée du Louvre, Paris).

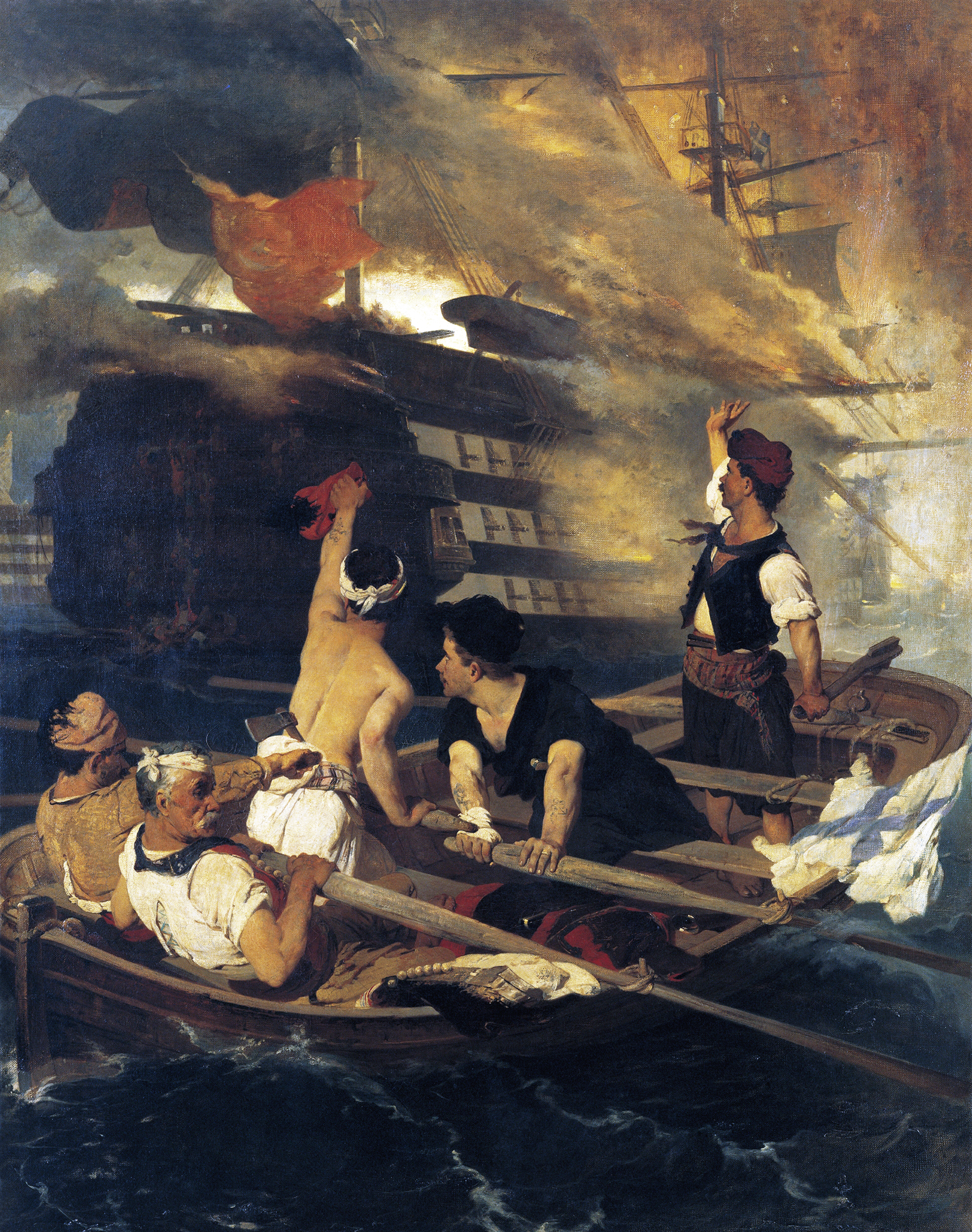
"The blowing up of the Nasuh Ali Pasha's flagship by Konstantinos Kanaris", painted by Nikiphoros Lytras (143 cm × 109 cm (56 in × 43 in). Averoff Gallery). Kanaris blew up the flagship as a revenge for the massacre.

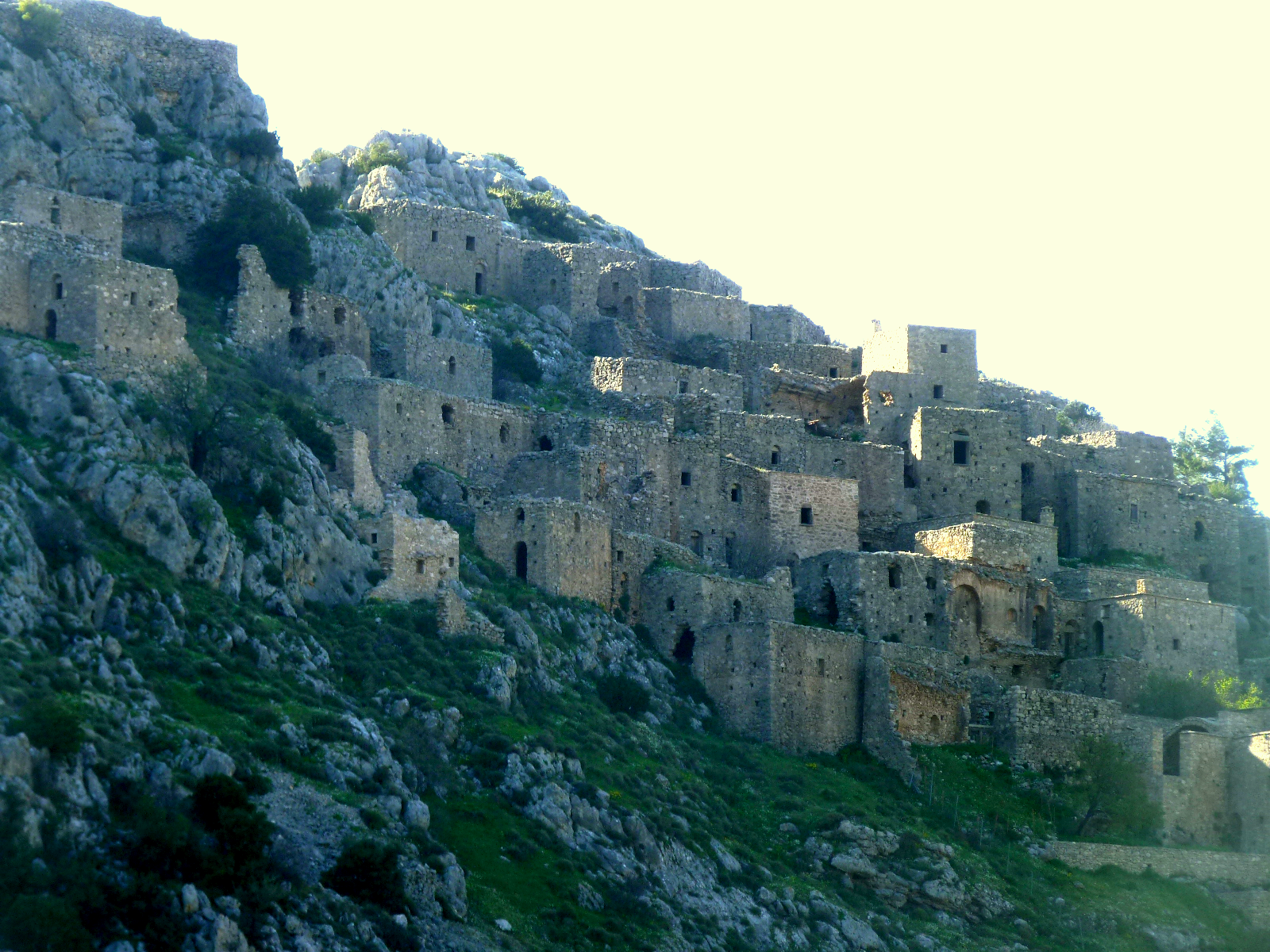
Anavatos abandoned village

In April 1566, the island of Chios was captured by the Ottoman Empire after the surrender to Piyale Pasha. Subsequently, the Genoans were sent to the capital and after some time upon the request of the French ambassador they were allowed to return with a firman.

During Ottoman rule, the government and tax gathering again remained in the hands of Greeks and the Turkish garrison was small and inconspicuous.

As well as the Latin and Turkish influx, documents record a small Jewish population from at least 1049 AD. The original Greek (Romaniote) Jews, thought to have been brought over by the Romans, were later joined by Sephardic Jews welcomed by the Ottomans during the Iberian expulsions of the late 15th century.

The mainstay of the island's famous wealth was the mastic crop. Chios was able to make a substantial contribution to the imperial treasury while at the same time maintaining only a light level of taxation. The Ottoman government regarded it as one of the most valuable provinces of the Empire.

When the Greek War of Independence broke out, the island's leaders were reluctant to join the revolutionaries, fearing the loss of their security and prosperity. However, in March 1822, several hundred armed Greeks from the neighbouring island of Samos landed in Chios. They proclaimed the revolution and launched attacks against the Turks, at which point islanders decided to join the struggle.

Ottomans landed a large force on the island consequently and put down the rebellion. The Ottoman massacre of Chios expelled, killed or enslaved thousands of the inhabitants of the island. It wiped out whole villages and affected the Mastichochoria area, the mastic growing villages in the south of the island. It triggered also negative public reaction in Western Europe, as portrayed by Eugène Delacroix, and in the writing of Lord Byron and Victor Hugo. In 1825, Thomas Barker of Bath painted a fresco depicting the Chios Massacre on the walls of Doric House, Bath, Somerset. Finally, Chios was not included in the modern Greek state and remained under Ottoman rule.

The 1881 Chios earthquake, estimated as 6.5 on the moment magnitude scale, damaged a large portion of the island's buildings and resulted in great loss of life. Reports of the time spoke of 5,500–10,000 fatalities.

Remarkably, despite the terrible devastation, in the later 19th century Chios emerged as the motherland of the modern Greek shipping industry. Indicatively, while in 1764, Chios had 6 vessels with 90 sailors on record, in 1875 there were 104 ships with over 60,000 registered tonnes, and in 1889 were recorded 440 sailing ships of various types with 3,050 sailors. The dynamic development of Chian shipping in the 19th century is further attested by the various shipping related services that were present in the island during this time, such as the creation of the shipping insurance companies Chiaki Thalassoploia (Χιακή Θαλασσοπλοΐα), Dyo Adelfai (Δυο Αδελφαί), Omonoia (Ομόνοια) and the shipping bank Archangelos (Αρχάγγελος) (1863). The boom of Chian shipping took place with the successful transition from sailing vessels to steam. To this end, Chian ship owners were supported by the strong diaspora presence of Chian merchants and bankers, and the connections they had developed with the financing centers of the time (Istanbul, London), the establishment in London of shipping businessmen, the creation of shipping academies in Chios and the expertise of Chian personnel on board.

=== In independent Greece ===
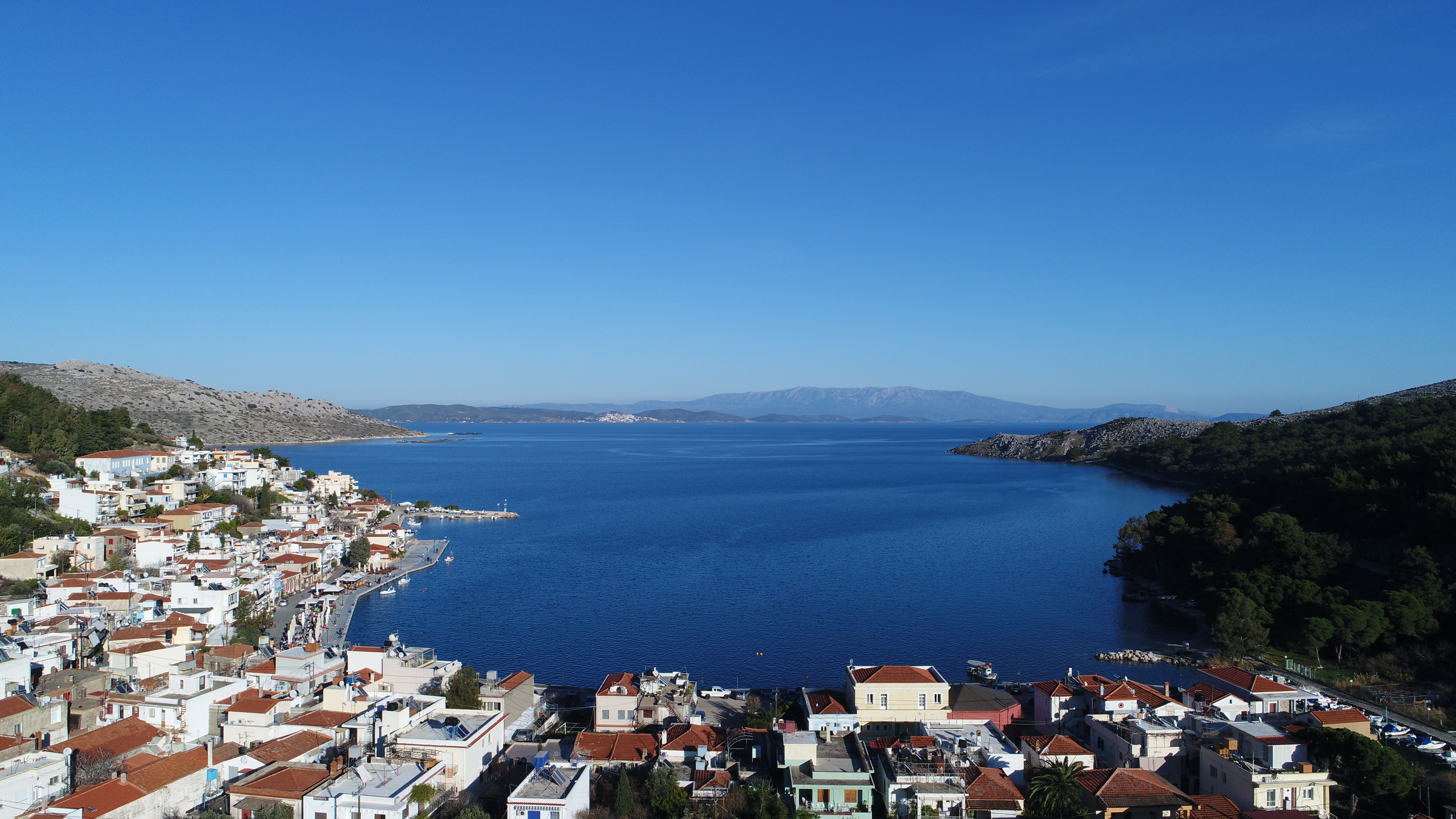
The port of Lagada

Chios joined the rest of independent Greece after the First Balkan War (1912). The Greek Navy landed at Chios in November 1912 and took control of the island after a series of clashes that lasted for over a month. The Ottoman Empire recognized Greece's annexation of Chios and the other Aegean islands by signing the Treaty of London (1913).

Although Greece was officially neutral, the island was occupied by the British during World War I, on 17 February 1916. This may have been due to the island's proximity to the Ottoman Empire and the city of İzmir in particular.

It was affected also by the population exchange between Greece and Turkey after the Greco–Turkish War of 1919–1922, with the incoming Greek refugees from Asia Minor settling in Kastro (previously a Turkish neighborhood) and in new settlements hurriedly built south of Chios town.

The island saw some local violence during the Greek Civil War setting neighbour against neighbour. This ended when the final band of communist fighters was trapped and killed in the orchards of Kampos and their bodies driven through the main town on the back of a truck. In March 1948, the island was used as an internment camp for female political detainees (communists or relatives of guerillas) and their children, who were housed in military barracks near the town of Chios. Up to 1300 women and 50 children were housed in cramped and degrading conditions, until March 1949 when the camp was closed and the inhabitants moved to Trikeri.

The production of mastic was threatened by the Chios forest fire that swept the southern half of the island in August 2012 and destroyed some mastic groves.

By 2015, Chios had become a transit point for refugees and asylum seekers entering the EU from Turkey. A reception and identification centre was formed at VIAL near the village of Chalkeio, however, in 2021 the Greek government announced a new closed reception centre will be built in a more isolated location at Akra Pachy near the village of Pantoukios.

== Demographics ==
Historical population
Year	Pop.	±%
2001	51,773	—
2011	51,390	−0.7%
2021	50,361	−2.0%

== Government ==
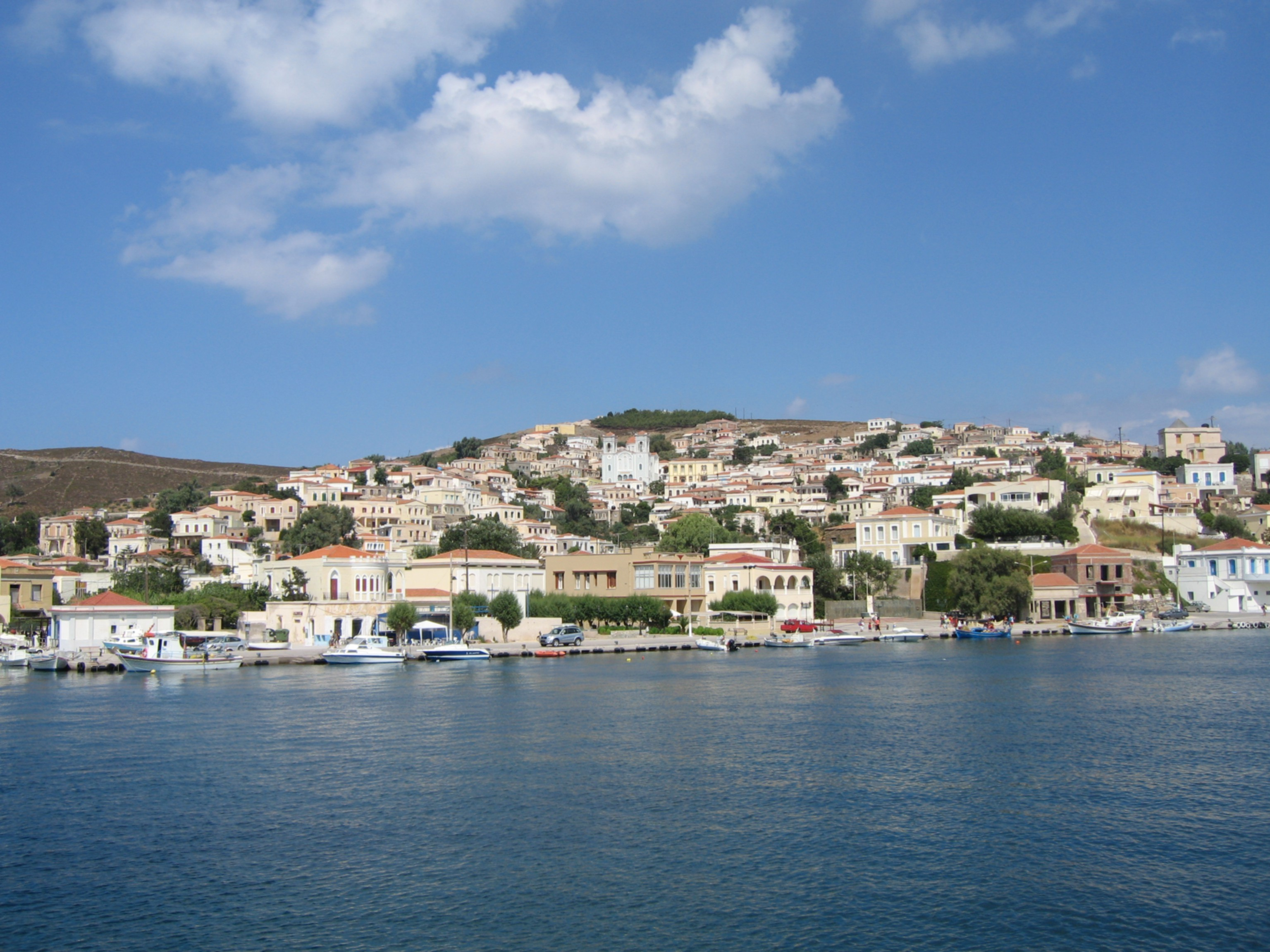
View of Oinousses

The present municipality Chios was formed at the 2011 local government reform by the merger of the following 8 former municipalities, that became municipal units:

- Agios Minas
- Amani
- Chios (town)
- Ionia
- Kampochora
- Kardamyla
- Mastichochoria
- Omiroupoli

== Economy ==
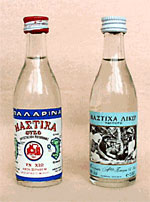
Bottles of Chios mastiha alcoholic beverages: Masticha Ouzo (left) and Masticha Liqueur (right).

=== Commerce ===
The local merchant shipping community transports several locally grown products including mastic, olives, figs, wine, mandarins, and cherries.

=== Cuisine ===
Local specialities of the island include:

- Kordelia, pasta
- Malathropita
- Neratzopita
- Mastello (cheese)
- Valanes, type of pasta
- Sfougato, type of omelette
- Mamoulia (dessert)
- Masourakia (dessert)
- Mastiha (drink)
- Souma (drink)

=== Antimony mines ===
Sporadically for some time during the early 19th century to 1950s there was mining activity on the island at Keramos Antimony Mines.

=== Transport ===
Chios is served by one national road to the east, the EO75, and 23 numbered provincial roads, the latter of which make up most of the road network in Chios. The island is also served by one regional airport, Chios Island National Airport, which is named after the ancient Greek poet Homer.

== Culture ==
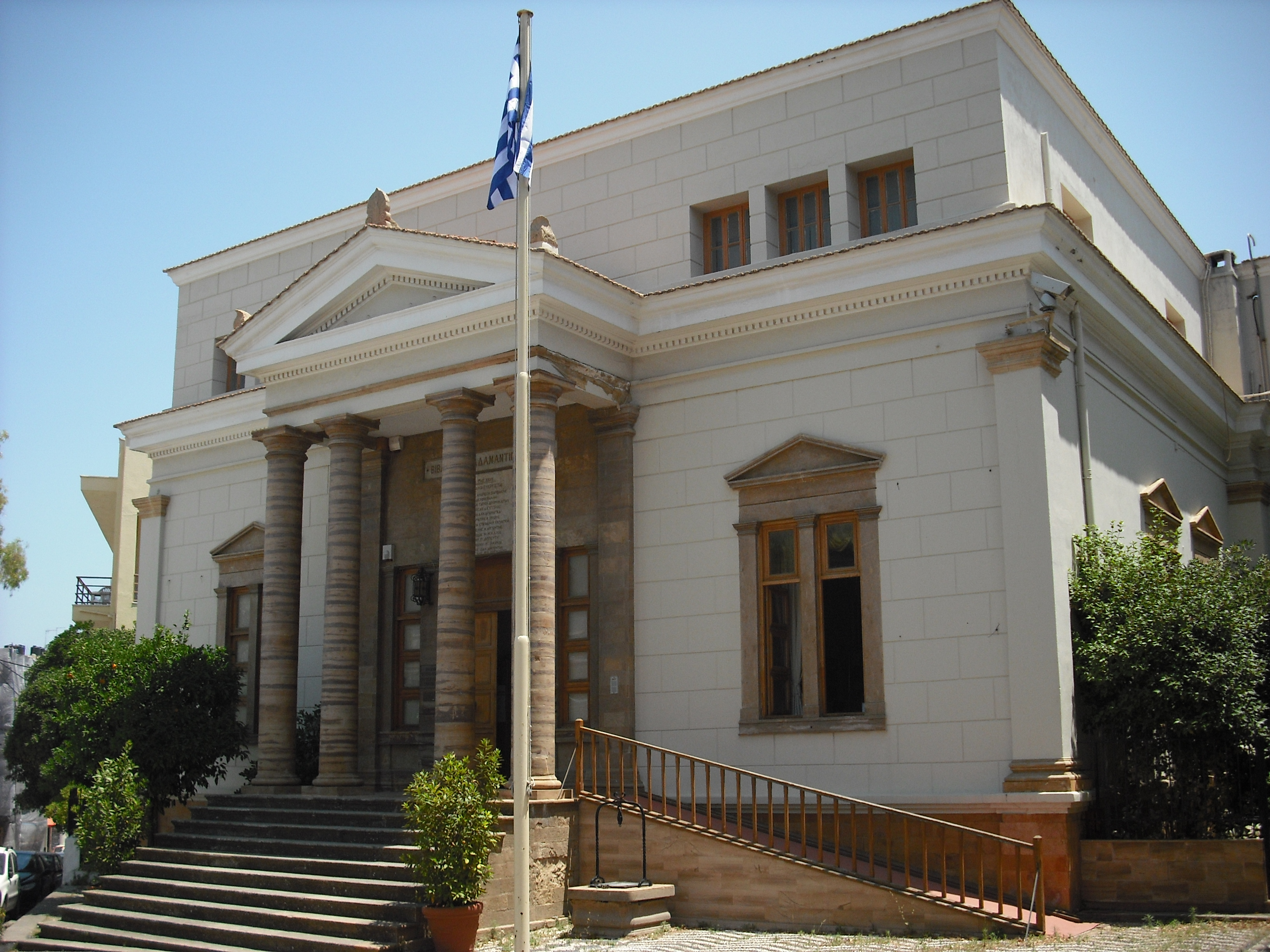
Adamantios Korais public library of Chios town.

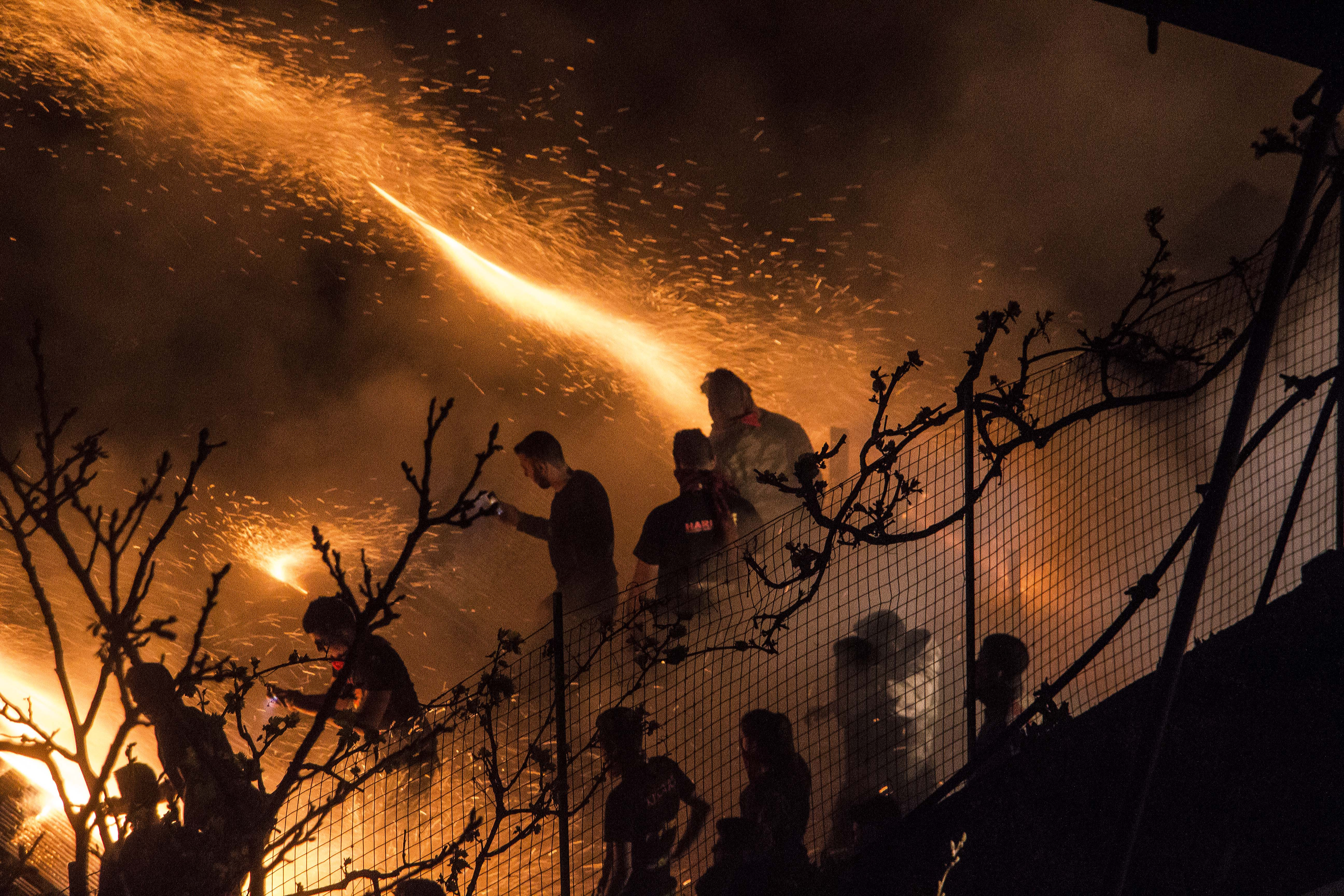
Rouketopolemos (Rocket war), Vrontados

- Nea Moni is a monastery with fine mosaics from Constantine IX's reign and a World Heritage Site.
- An ancient inscription (at Chios Archaeological Museum) from a fifth-century funerary monument for Heropythos the son of Philaios, traced his family back over fourteen generations to Kyprios at the tenth century BC, before there were any written records in Greece.

Forts

- Castle of Chios, a Byzantine fort built in the 10th century
  - St. George's church

Museums

- Chios Byzantine Museum
- The Chios Mastic Museum
- Archaeological Museum of Chios
- Chios Maritime Museum

Traditions

- The town of Vrontados is home to a unique Easter celebration, where competing teams of locals gather at the town's two (rival) churches to fire tens of thousands of homemade rockets at the other church's bell tower while the Easter service is going on inside the churches, in what has become known as rouketopolemos.

Sports

- F.C. Lailapas (Chios town)
- NC Chios, water polo
- Panchiakos GS

Media

- Alithia TV
- Chiakos Laos, newspaper
- Politis, newspaper
- Dimokratiki, newspaper

=== Twin town, sister cities ===
Chios is twinned with:

- Çeşme, Turkey
- Ermoupoli, Greece
- Polykastro, Greece
- Ortona, Italy
- Brezno, Slovakia
- Genoa, Italy (since 1985)
- Guiyang, China

== Notable natives and inhabitants ==
A native of Chios is known in English as a Chian.

=== Ancient ===
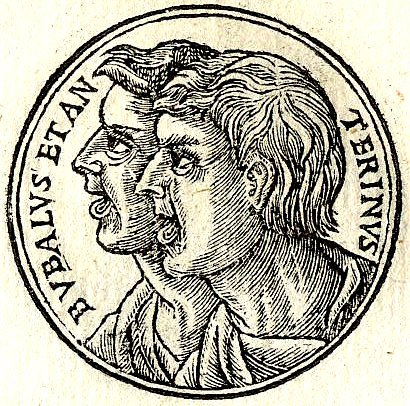
Bupalus and Athenis, sons of Archermus

- Homer (8th century BC), poet. See History of the Pelopennesian War by Thucydides, section 3.104.5, wherein Thucydides quotes Homer's self-reference: "A blind old man of Scio's rocky isle."
- Glaucus of Chios (c. 700 BC), Greek sculptor in metal
- Homeridae
- Oenopides (c. 490 – c. 420 BC), mathematician and geometer
- Ion of Chios (484–421 BC), tragedy writer
- Hippocrates of Chios (c. 470 – c. 410 BC), notable mathematician, geometer and astronomer
- Likymnios of Chios (5th century – 4th century BC), Greek sophist and dithyrambic poet
- Metrodorus of Chios (4th century BC), Greek philosopher
- Theopompus of Chios (378 – c. 320 BC), rhetorical historian
- Erasistratus of Chios (304–250 BC), pioneering anatomist, royal physician and founder of the ancient medical school of Alexandria, who discovered the linking between organs through the systems of veins, arteries and nerves
- Aristo of Chios (c. 260 BC), Stoic philosopher
- Claudia Metrodora (c. 54–68 AD), public benefactor

=== Medieval ===
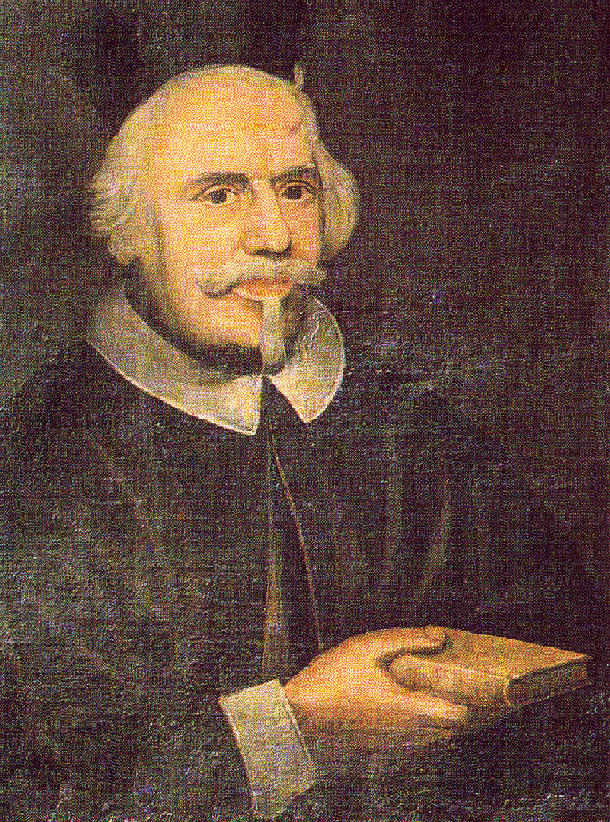
Leo Allatius

- Saint Markella (14th century), martyr and saint of the Greek Orthodox church
- Leo Kalothetos (1315–1363), provincial governor of the Byzantine empire
- Leonard of Chios (15th century), Greek Dominican scholar
- Giovanni Giustiniani (1418–1453), died during the Fall of Constantinople and buried in Chios
- Matrona of Chios (* 15th century, † before 1455), saint of the Greek Orthodox church
- Andreas Argenti (saint) († 1465 n. Chr.), neomartyr of the Orthodox Church
- Andrea Bianco (15th century), Genoese cartographer resided on Chios
- In 1982, Ruth Durlacher hypothesised that Chios was Christopher Columbus's birthplace. Columbus himself said he was from the Republic of Genoa, which included the island of Chios at the time. Columbus was friendly with a number of Chian Genoese families, referenced Chios in his writings and used the Greek language for some of his notes. 'Columbus' remains a common surname on Chios. Other common Greek spellings are: Kouloumbis and Couloumbis.
- Vincenzo Giustiniani (Dominican) (1516–1582), cardinal
- Vincenzo Giustiniani (1564–1637), Italian banker and art collector
- Francisco Albo (16th century), pilot of Magellan expedition, the first circumnavigation of the Earth
- Leo Allatius (Leone Allacci) (c. 1586–1669), Greek Catholic scholar and theologian
- Constantine Rodocanachi (1635–1687), Ottoman Greek academic, chemist, lexicographer, and physician to Charles II of England

=== Modern ===
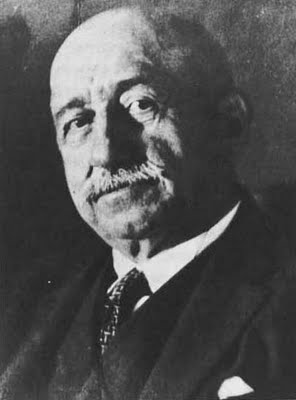
Ioannis Psycharis, major promoter of Demotic Greek

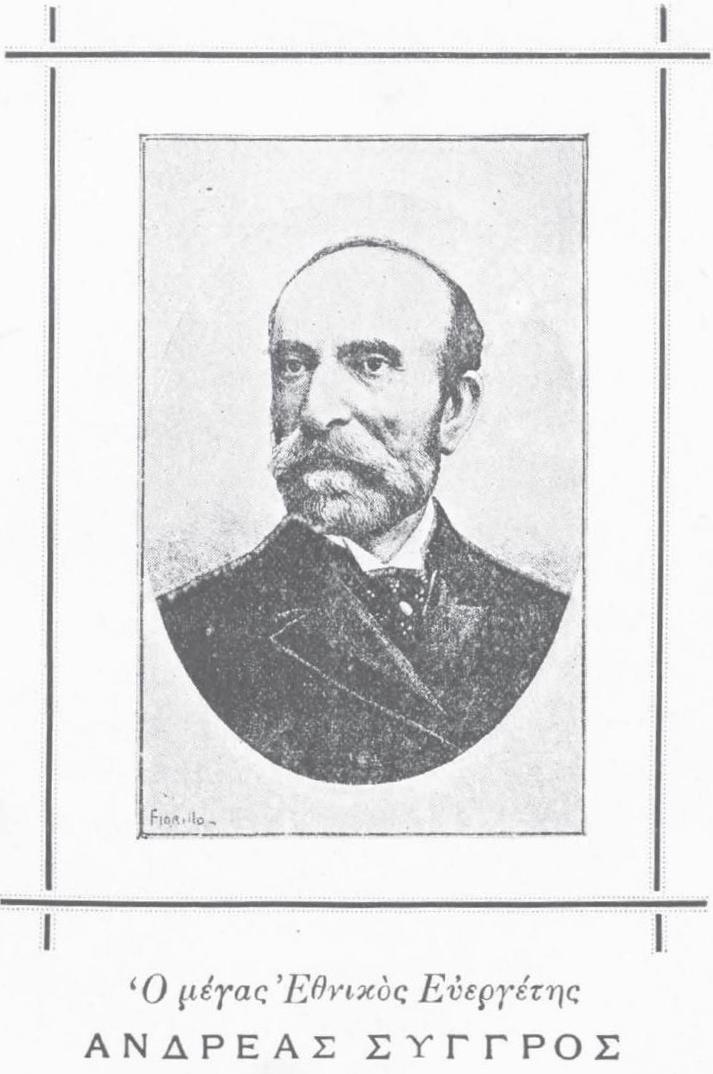
Andreas Syggros

- Rodocanachi, noble family
- Scylitzes, noble family of Byzantine descent
- Mavrokordatos, noble, then princely family in Eastern Europe
- Negroponte, noble family
- Damalas, princely family, former rulers during the Frankokratia
- Rallis, noble family of which the famous Ralli Brothers/Ralli baronets descend from
- Athanasios Parios (1722–1813), Greek hieromonk and notable theologian, philosopher, educator, and hymnographer of his time
- Macarius of Corinth (1731–1805), metropolitan bishop of Corinth, mystic and spiritual theological writer
- Nikephoros of Chios (ca. 1750–1821), abbot of Nea Moni monastery, theological writer and orthodox saint
- Eustratios Argenti (theologian) (1685–1762), theological writer and medical doctor
- Eustratios Argenti (national hero) (1767‒1798), executed with Rigas Velestinlis
- Alexandros Kontostavlos (1789–1865), politician
- Christophorus Plato Castanis (1814–1866), Ottoman Greek academic, author and classicist, as well as former slave, orphan and refugee to the United States
- Alexandros Georgios Paspatis (1814–1891), linguist, historian and physician, researcher of the Romani language and of the history and culture of the Roma people
- George Colvocoresses (1816–1872), military officer
- Mustapha Khaznadar (1817–1878), was Prime Minister of the Beylik of Tunis
- Michel Emmanuel Rodocanachi (1821–1901), trader and banker of London
- Andreas Syggros (1830–1899), banker, descended from Chios
- George Glarakis (1789–1855), politician, Minister of Education (1838)
- Patriarch Constantine V of Constantinople (1833–1914)
- Ibrahim Edhem Pasha (1819–1893), Ottoman Grand Vizier
- Namık Kemal (1840–1888), one of the principal founders of modern Turkish literature, served as a sub-prefect (exiled in practical terms) of Chios from 1886 to his death on the island in 1888
- Osman Hamdi Bey (1842–1910), Ottoman painter, archaeologist
- Ioannis Psycharis (1854–1929), philologist, descended from Chios
- Ambrosios Skaramagas, merchant
- Konstantinos Amantos (1874–1960), Byzantine scholar, professor at the University of Athens, member of the Athens Academy
- Stylianos Miliadis (1881‒1965), painter
- Kostia Vlastos (1883–1967), banker, of the old Vlastos family
- John D. Chandris (1890–1942), Greek shipowner
- Stavros Livanos (1891–1963), shipping magnate
- Ioannis Despotopoulos (1903–1992), architect
- Kostas Perrikos (1905–1943), Greek Resistance figure, leader of PEAN
- Yiannis Carras (1907–1989), shipowner
- Adamantios Lemos (1916–2006), actor
- Andreas Papandreou (1919–1996), politician, Prime Minister of Greece
- Mikis Theodorakis (1925‒2021), composer, born on the island
- Jani Christou (1926–1970), composer
- George P. Livanos (1926–1997), Greek shipowner
- Petros Molyviatis (1928–2025), politician
- Stamatios Krimigis (1938), NASA space scientist
- Takis Fotopoulos (1940), political philosopher
- Adamantios Vassilakis (1942‒2021), diplomat
- Dimitris Varos (1949‒2017), author, poet, journalist
- Mark Palios (1952, of Chian descent), former professional footballer and former chief executive of the English Football Association
- Matthew Mirones (1956), New York politician
- Nikos Pateras (1963), shipowner
- Angeliki Frangou (1965), shipowner
- John Sitaras (1972), fitness professional
- Ioannis Fountoulis (1988), water polo player

== See also ==
- Chian wine
- Chian diaspora
