= Chian wine =

Chian wine /ˈkaɪ.ən/ was a product of the Greek island of Chios. It was among the most prized wines in classical antiquity and, according to Theopompus and Greek mythology, was the first red wine, then called "black wine".

== Greece ==
Chian wine was exported in great quantities to ancient Athens starting around the 5th century BC, as attested by the large number of Chian amphorae discovered in modern-day excavations there. It was later characterized by Plutarch and Athenaios as having been an expensive luxury good in classical Greece, though they may have exaggerated somewhat, as inscriptions on excavated amphorae seem to suggest a moderate price of two drachmas per chous versus about two to ten obols per chous for local wine. Athenaios also quotes Hermippus praising Chian wine's quality in the 5th century BC, and Strabo some centuries later considered wine from the Chian district of Ariusium to be the finest in Greece.

== Rome ==
Before the 1st century AD, Chian wine was rare and expensive in ancient Rome. It was mainly prescribed in small quantities for medicinal purposes, as was then often done with rare food and drink, and was otherwise considered an extreme luxury: Horace, writing in the 1st century BC, had his character Nasidienus in the Satires serve Chian wine at an excessively sumptuous dinner party. After about the 1st century AD, it became more common at the increasingly lavish private and public festivities of Rome, as well as continuing to be well regarded for medicinal purposes, and was ranked among the finest wines by Galen and Pliny.

== See also ==
- Ancient Greece and wine
