= Keramos Antimony Mines (Chios) =

Coordinates: 38°33′13.1″N 25°56′18.6″E

The mines of Keramos are 19th and 20th century mines which were located in the northern part of Chios island, Greece and nowadays is out of use. The mines are best known for extracting stibnite ore for antimony production. A number of remnants of these mines (shafts, galleries, surface workshops) are still present in the region.

The location of Keramos was mined in some scale in the mid 19th century but is not clear if it was for metal ore or just a rock mine. Either way, the mines were systematically used in the 1890s when a French metallurgist engineer A. Pelloux assayed the metal ore identity and quality during his vacations. French and Greek companies utilise them for few years each, until 1954.

== History ==
The mining activity started in 1897 after a French mining company named "Societe Anonyme des Mines de Keramos" acquired the rights 2 years earlier. The company was owned by Giovanni B. Serpieri 's heirs, the same family that owned Lavrion silver mines.

The man that led that facility was the same man that recommended the stibnite mining, A. Pelloux, and served as general manager until 1908 when the production was judged not viable.

After a 40-year hiatus, in 1949, the mining rights were reassigned by the Greek government to "Greek Mining Companies" (Ancient Greek: Ελληνικαί Μεταλλευτικαί Επιχειρήσεις) owned by Bodossaki company. That project was part of "Marshall Plan" to revive Greek economy after second world war. but this act was also short lived since the mines were essentially abandoned in 1954.

Ever since structural entities of the mines industrial site were slowly turned to ruins. Greek government gave partially some small extend permits for mining to "Chios Mines Ltd" (Ancient Greek: Μεταλλεία Χίου Ε.Π.Ε.) between 1954 – 1970 but without any real investment involved the Greek government decided the exception of mining in all Chios with a 1987 law.
