= Vrontados =

Vrontados Βροντάδος
- Community
- Location within Greece
- Coordinates: 38°25′N 26°8′E
- Country: Greece
- Administrative region: North Aegean
- Regional unit: Chios
- Municipality: Chios
- Municipal unit: Omiroupoli
- Elevation: 42 m (138 ft)

Population (2021)
  - Community: 5,270
- Time zone: UTC+2 (EET)
  - Summer (DST): UTC+3 (EEST)

Vrontados (Greek: Βροντάδος) is a small coastal town located at the eastern part of the island of Chios in Greece. With a population of about 5,300, the town hosts the seat of the municipal unit of Omiroupoli.

== Information ==
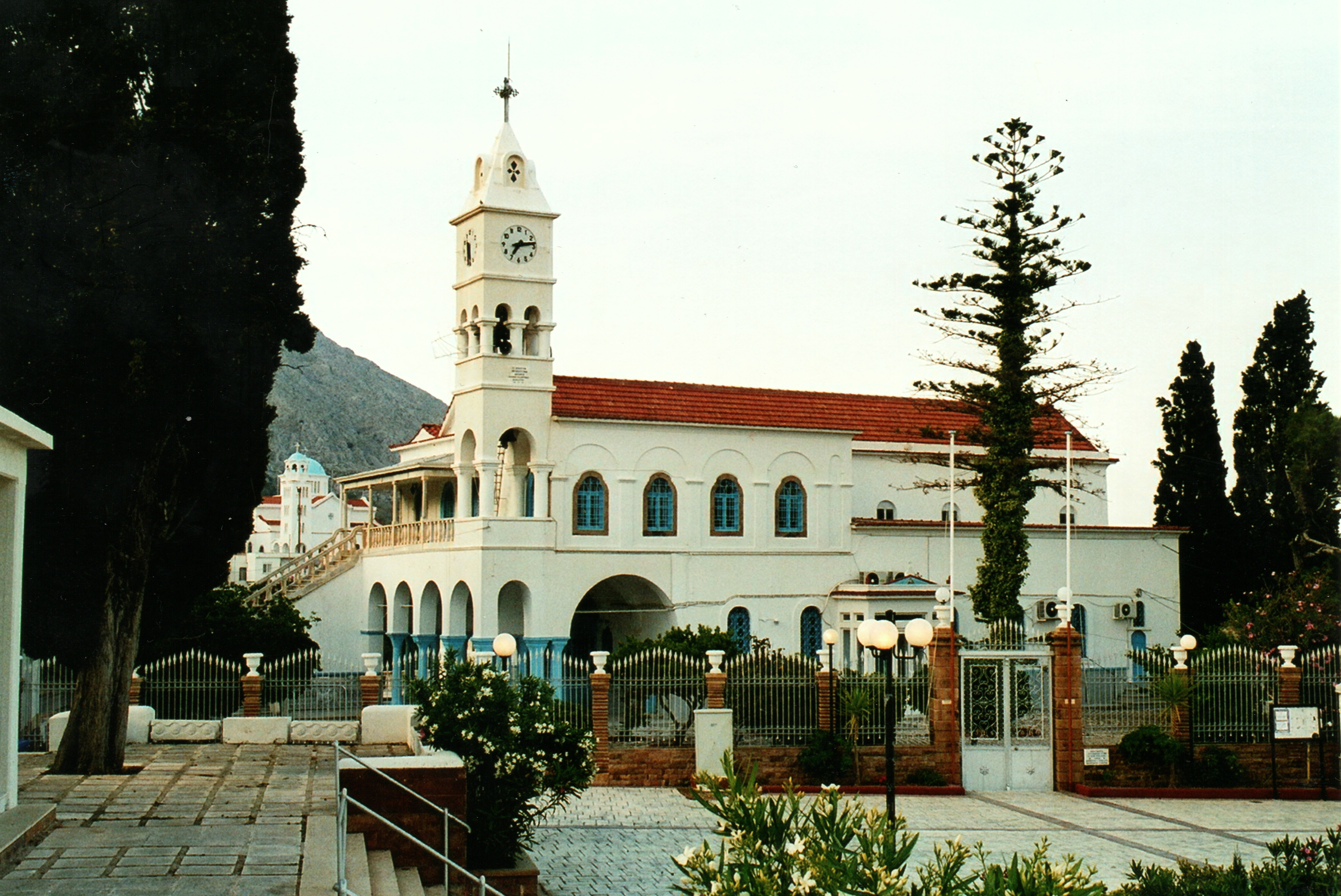
Church in Vrontados

The town has a strong tradition in merchant seafaring and is currently the home of various important Greek ship owners. Due to its proximity to the city of Chios (the island's capital), modern Vrontados is considered a sort of a suburb of the capital. Vrontados purportedly gets its name from the loud noise thunder (Greek: βροντή, vrontí) makes as it echoes from the nearby mountain Aepos.

== Customs ==
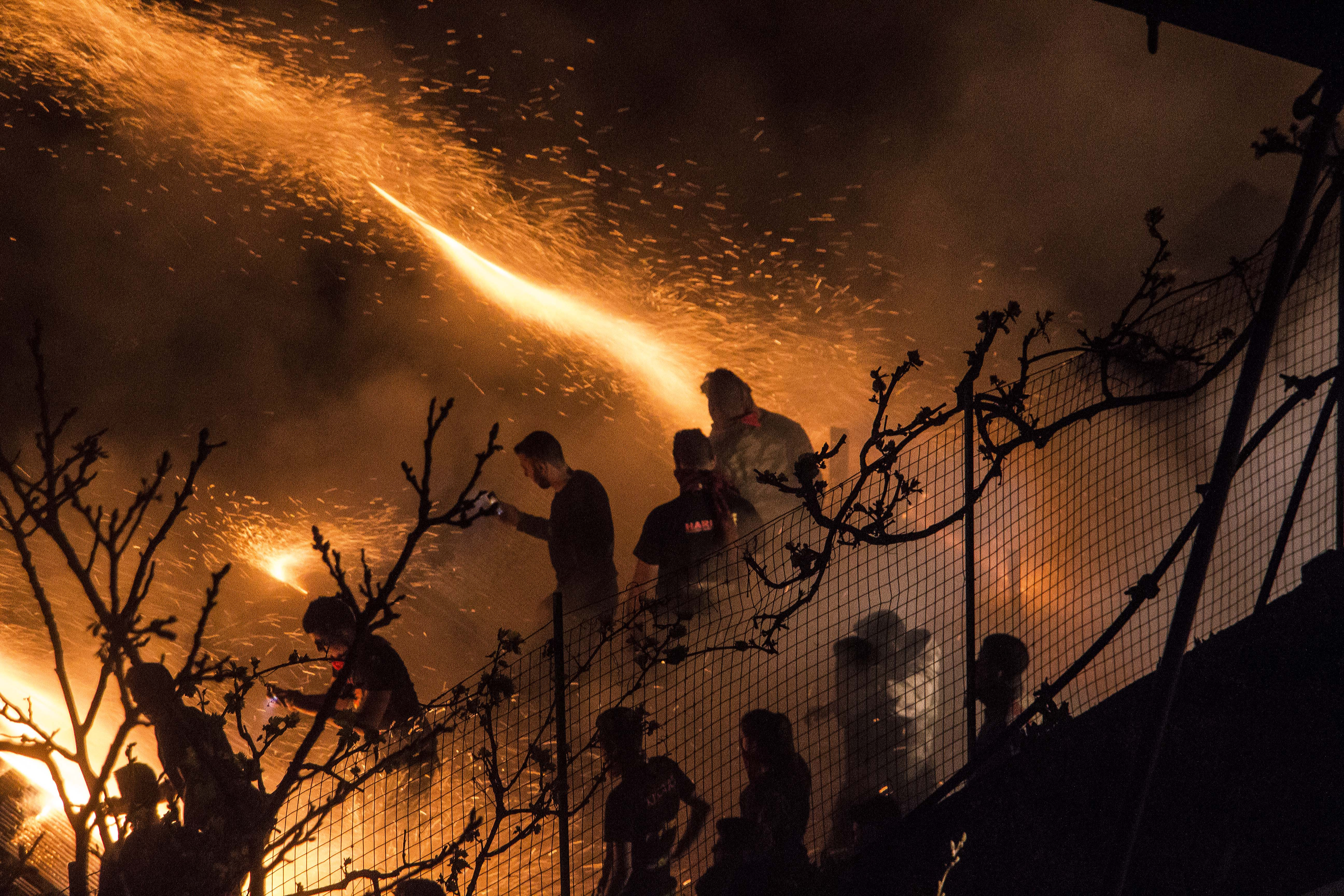
The rouketopolemos on Easter, 2015

Vrontados is best-known for its unique Easter custom of the rouketopolemos ("rocket war"). Every Easter, the two Eastern Orthodox parishes of Saint Mark's and Panagia Erithiani, fire skyrockets at each other. Whoever hits the opposing church's bell tower first wins the war.

== Historical references ==
The legendary Poet Homer was supposedly born or at least lived for a long time in Chios. On the north side of the Vrontados coast is the so-called "Homer's stone", a rather uncomfortable natural rock throne where according to the legend the poet sang and taught.

According to tradition, Christopher Columbus visited Vrontados in order to study nautical charts and get information from experienced Vrontadian seamen who would help him on his voyages to the Americas.

== Notable natives and inhabitants ==
- Stamatios Krimigis (1938) space scientist

== See also ==
- List of settlements in the Chios regional unit
