= Hellenic Physical Society =

Greek nonprofit organization

- Ένωση Ελλήνων Φυσικών
- Abbreviation: ΕΕΦ
- Formation: 1930; 96 years ago
- Type: Scientific
- Purpose: To develop scientific research, pedagogy, and professional code of conduct in Physical Sciences, in Greece and abroad.
- Headquarters: Grivaion 6, Athens, 10680, Greece
- Members: 3,056 (as of 2020)
- Official language: Greek
- Website: https://eef.gr

The Hellenic Physical Society (Greek: Ένωση Ελλήνων Φυσικών) is a not-for-profit membership organization of professionals in physics and related disciplines. Its mission is to develop scientific research, pedagogy, and professional code of conduct in Physical Sciences, in Greece and abroad. Since January 1970, the Hellenic Physical Society (ΕΕΦ) is a member of the European Physical Society

== History ==
The Hellenic Physical Society was founded in 1930, in Athens, where it is headquartered. According to a report by Europhysics News, ΕΕΦ had 1,050 members in 1974, while in 2020, its members were 3,054.

== Activities ==
The Hellenic Physical Society is active in research and pedagogy in physics, by organizing conferences, seminars, outreach events, and by publishing physics-related educational and scientific publications, such as conference proceedings. The Society participates in various international networks of scientific associations, such as the European Physical Society and the Balkan Physical Union, and seeks to further expand communication and international cooperation in physics. The Society offers awards to distinguished physicists for their contribution to education and science, such as Giorgos Grammatikakis, and Stamatios Krimigis. ΕΕΦ is also involved with the advancement of teaching physics in secondary education.

== Criticism ==
The Hellenic Physical Society has faced criticism for endorsing activities and claims considered pseudoscientific. A notable dispute involved a five-year legal case with the fact-checking website Ellinika Hoaxes, which questioned the scientific validity of certain EEP-endorsed events and statements. The lawsuit filed by the EEP was dismissed by both the Athens Court of First Instance and the Court of Appeal, which ruled the articles constituted fair criticism. Critics argue these activities undermine the credibility of science and physics education in Greece, while the EEP maintains that its educational contributions are often overlooked.

The Board of Directors of the Hellenic Physical Society (HPS) unanimously decided (meeting on May 4 2026) that “the HPS, in accordance with its institutional role, does not issue opinions on matters that lack sufficient documentation (recorded data, statistical analysis, mathematical processing, validation of predictions)”

The Board of Directors of the Hellenic Physical Society (HPS), at its meeting on 04-05-2026, unanimously decided to proceed with the publication of the following text:

“The promotion and dissemination in Greece of the Physical Sciences and their applications, as well as the improvement of the position of its members through informing society and the state about them” is the purpose of the HPS (Statute, Article 1).
Therefore, the HPS, in accordance with its institutional role, does not issue opinions on matters that lack sufficient documentation (recorded data, statistical analysis, mathematical processing, validation of predictions).
In the past, the HPS was subject to negative public criticism (Kathimerini, Ellinika Hoaxes) because some of its members participated in discussions on insufficiently substantiated issues.
The members of the HPS, of course, express personal opinions on all matters, as active citizens who contribute to public dialogue.
The demanding distinction of scientific discourse from philosophical reflection, artistic creation, and theology constitutes a prerequisite for the harmonization and synthesis of human experience.
