= Claudia Metrodora =

Graeco Roman public benefactor

Claudia Metrodora (fl. c. 54 – 68 AD) was a Graeco-Roman public benefactor. A resident of the island of Chios, Metrodra was able to benefit the city when she held magistracies and stephanophoros. Metrodora was the daughter of Claudius Kalobrotos of Teos, and the adopted daughter of Skytheinos of Chios.

Details saved from a fragmentary inscription from Ephesus reveal that Claudia Metrodora paid from her own finances to provide public meals, erected public baths, held the honorary rank of gymnasiarch on four occasions, provided supplies of liver oil twice for public consumption, and was honoured as a basileia of the Ionian League.

== Sources ==
- R van Bremen, The Limits of Participation (1996)
- Kearsley, Roy, "Women in Public Life in the Roman East: Iunia Theodora, Claudia Metrodora and Phoebe, Benefactress of Paul," Tyndale Bulletin 50/2 (1999), p. 189 - 211.
