= Stamatios Krimigis =

Greek-American space exploration scientist (b. 1938)

Stamatios M. Krimigis
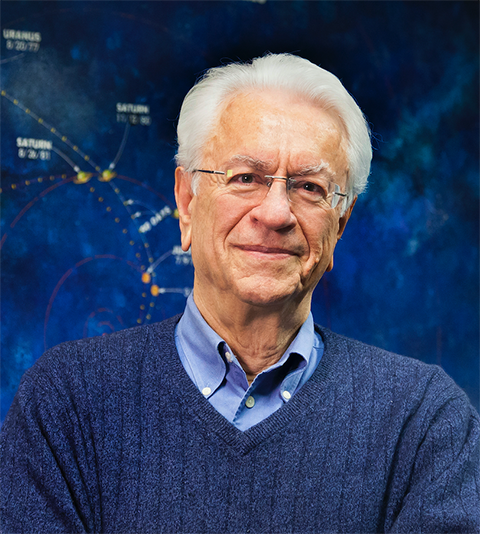
- Born: Stamatios Mike Krimigis; September 10, 1938 (age 87); Vrontados, Chios, Greece
- Citizenship: Greece; United States
- Employer: Applied Physics Laboratory
- Scientific career
- Thesis: An interplanetary diffusion model for the time behavior of intensity in a solar cosmic ray event (1965)
- Doctoral advisor: James Van Allen

Stamatios (Tom) Mike Krimigis (Greek: Σταμάτιος Κριμιζής; born September 10, 1938) is a Greek-American space physicist, who contributed to multiple space probe missions. He has contributed to exploration missions to almost every planet of the Solar System. In 1999, the International Astronomical Union named the asteroid 8323 Krimigis (previously 1979 UH) in his honor.

== Biography ==
Stamatios Krimigis was born September 10, 1938 in Vrontados, Chios, Greece, where he completed his early education. He then moved to the United States to further his studies. Krimigis studied physics at the University of Minnesota (BSc 1961) and at the University of Iowa (MSc 1963, Ph.D. 1965). His PhD advisor was renowned space scientist James Van Allen.

He is Head Emeritus of the Space Department at the Johns Hopkins Applied Physics Laboratory in Laurel, Maryland. He holds the Chair of Science of Space at the Academy of Athens, Greece, and serves as the president of the Greek National Council for Research and Technology.

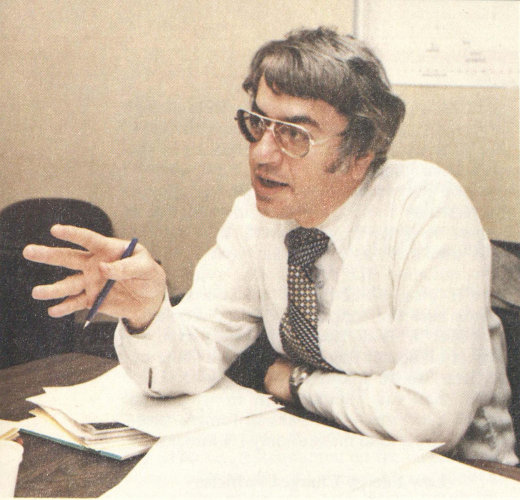
Krimigis in c. 1980

Krimigis led or participated in space physics experiments on space probe mission to all nine classical planets. He worked on 21 instruments for various NASA and European Space Agency missions. His Low Energy Charged Particle Experiment (LECP) instrument flies aboard both Voyager spacecraft; on Voyager 1, LECP data was essential to determining that a spacecraft had left the solar system for the first time in 2012. Krimigis also participated in establishing NASA's Discovery Program of low-cost planetary missions, as well as the New Frontiers program, for which the APL-built New Horizons to Pluto was the first mission. He is also a co-investigator on the Parker Solar Probe, launched in 2018.

He is co-investigator for LAN/HI-SCALE on Ulysses solar polar orbiter, EPIC on GEOTAIL, EDP for Galileo mission, TRD on Mariner 3, and for the LECR on Mariner 4. Krimigis has also worked on the Cassini, Advanced Composition Explorer, the Mariner 5, MESSENGER and New Horizons programs.

In 1986, Krimigis briefed Ronald Reagan on the AMPTE mission. He also met with Mikhail Gorbachev in 1987 and George W. Bush in 1990 to discuss space exploration.

In 2016, Krimigis received NASA's highest service honor, the NASA Distinguished Public Service Medal, for his lifelong efforts to advance space exploration and science.

In 2017, Krimigis's contributions to the Voyager program were highlighted in the documentary film "The Farthest."

== Research contributions ==
Krimigis's research has focused on the study of the magnetospheres of planets and the heliosphere.

Krimigis's publication record spans from "Interplanetary diffusion model for time behavior of intensity in a solar cosmic ray event," published in the Journal of Geophysical Research in 1965, to "Search for the exit: Voyager 1 at heliosphere's border with the galaxy," published in Science in 2013. Krimigis has published nearly 600 articles in scientific journals and books, on solar observations, planetary magnetospheres, and the charged particles in the interplanetary space. Krimigis has over 21,000 citations.

== Honors and awards ==
- Fellow, APS, AGU, AAAS, AIAA
- Lifetime Achievement Award, Johns Hopkins Applied Physics Laboratory (2004)
- Member of the Academy of Athens, Chair of Science of Space (2004)
- COSPAR Space Science Award (2002)
- Smithsonian Institution Trophy (2002)
- Aviation Week and Space Technology Laurels in Space Award (1996, 2001)
- NASA Medal for Exceptional Scientific Achievement (1981, 1986)
- Basic Sciences Award, International Academy of Astronautics (1994)
- Council of European Aerospace Societies Gold Medal (2011)
- National Air and Space Museum Lifetime Achievement Trophy Award (2015)
- Hellenic Physical Society Award, for major contributions to science in Greece and abroad (May 11, 2015)
- American Astronomical Society Space Flight Award (2015)
- NASA Distinguished Public Service Medal (2016)
- International Academy of Astronautics von Karman Award (2017)
- Homeric Award from the Chian Federation of America (2005)
- Over 40 NASA and ESA Group Achievement Awards
