= Omiroupoli =

Omiroupoli Ομηρούπολη
- Municipal unit
- Location within the regional unit

- Location within Greece
- Coordinates: 38°24′N 26°7′E
- Country: Greece
- Administrative region: North Aegean
- Regional unit: Chios
- Municipality: Chios

Area
  - Municipal unit: 155.015 km^{2} (59.852 sq mi)
- Elevation: 40 m (130 ft)

Population (2021)
  - Municipal unit: 7,045
  - Municipal unit density: 45.45/km^{2} (117.7/sq mi)
- Time zone: UTC+2 (EET)
  - Summer (DST): UTC+3 (EEST)
- Postal code: 822 00
- Area code: 22710
- Vehicle registration: ΧΙ
- Website: www.homeroupolis.gr

Omiroupoli (Greek: Ομηρούπολη) is a former municipality in the central part of on the island of Chios, North Aegean, Greece. Since the 2011 local government reform it is part of the municipality Chios, of which it is a municipal unit.

Tradition claims that epic poet Homer (Όμηρος) was born and lived here, thus the name of the municipal unit.

== Description ==
The municipal unit has an area of 155.015 km^{2}. Population 7,045 people (2021 census). The seat of the municipality was Vrontados (pop. 5,270), the second largest town on the island (after Chios (town)). The next largest towns are Lagkáda, Karyaí, and Sykiáda.

== Historical population ==
Year	Population
1991	7,477
2001	7,335
2011	7,527
2021	7,045

== See also ==
- List of settlements in the Chios regional unit
