= Chios (mythology) =

In Greek mythology, Chios (/ˈkaɪ.ɒs/; Ancient Greek: Χίος) may refer to two possible eponyms of the island of Chios:

- Chios, one of the Oceanids as a daughter of the Titan Oceanus possibly by his sister-wife, Tethys.
- Chios, son of Poseidon and an unnamed Chian nymph. He received his name from the heavy snowfall that occurred while his mother was in labour (cf. Ancient Greek χιών chiōn "snow").

The island could as well have taken its name from the nymph Chione, or simply from the snowy weather.
