= Rouketopolemos =

Firework-themed festival in Vrontados, Greece

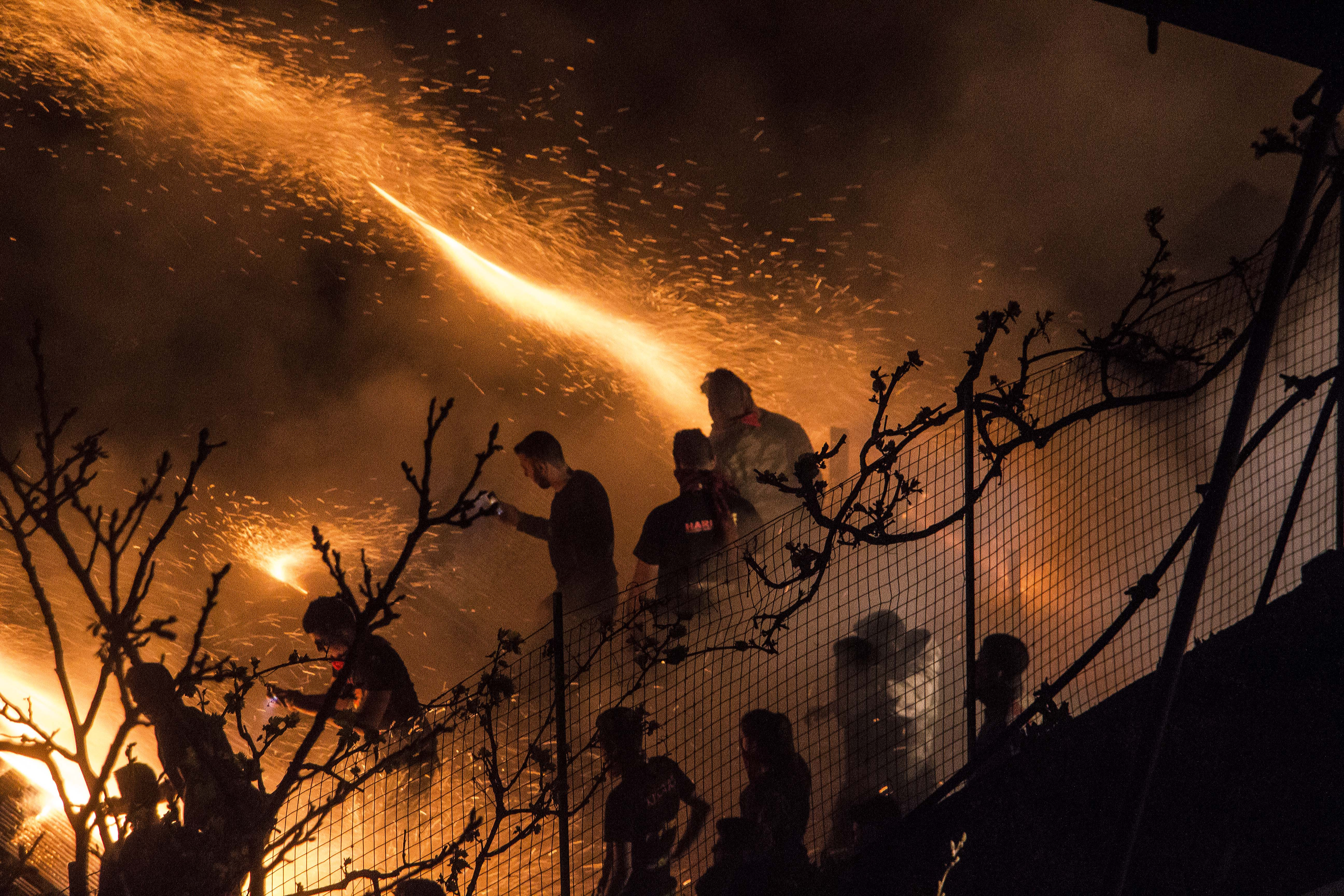
Rouketopolemos in 2015

Rouketopolemos (Greek Ρουκετοπόλεμος, literally 'rocket war') is a local traditional event held annually at Easter in the town of Vrontados (Βροντάδος), on the Greek island of Chios in the eastern Aegean Sea. It is a variation of the Greek custom of lighting fireworks at the Paschal Vigil on midnight of Easter Sunday. Two rival church congregations in the town stage the annual "battle" by each firing tens of thousands of homemade rockets at the opposing church, aiming especially for the belfry.

== Background ==
The event is held on Orthodox Easter Day as defined by the Julian calendar, which falls later in the year than the date of Easter determined with the Gregorian calendar in Western Christianity.

The exact origins of this tradition are unclear, but local legend holds that it dates back to the Ottoman period. According to folklore, real cannons were once used, until Ottoman authorities prohibited these in 1889.

== Description ==
Rockets are fired between two rival parishes, Saint Mark's and Panagia Ereithiani, built on two hilltops about 400 meters apart. During the battle, direct hits on the belfries are supposedly counted the next day to determine the winner, but each parish invariably claims victory. The result of this apparent disagreement is both parishes agree to settle the score the following Easter, and the custom is thus perpetuated. The churches and nearby buildings are extensively boarded up and protected with metal sheets and mesh for the occasion.

The skyrockets are homemade, comprising a head loaded with a gunpowder-based propellant, tied to a wooden guide stick. These rockets are then lined by the hundreds and fired from angled, grooved platforms.

== Criticism ==
Several residents regularly express dismay at the explosive nature of the custom, but it is a source of significant seasonal tourist revenue for the area.

The event was cancelled in 2016 due to complaints of property damage from some locals, but was revived in 2017 with new regulations on the duration of the battle and number of rockets launched.
