= Stylianos Miliadis =

Greek painter

Stylianos Miliadis Στυλιανός Μηλιάδης
- Born: 1881; Chios (now in Greece)
- Died: 1965; Piraeus, Greece
- Occupation: painter

Stylianos Myliadis (Greek: Στυλιανός Μηλιάδης, 1881-1965) was a Greek painter of the Munich School.

== Biography ==
He was born in the island of Chios, which belonged to the Ottoman Empire until 1912. Early on he moved to Piraeus where he took his first lessons from the distinguished painter Konstantinos Volanakis. He subsequently went to Munich, where he studied in the Walter Thor painting academy and in the Royal Bavarian Academy, among others under Nikolaos Gyzis. He returned to Piraeus for a short while, but then left for Paris to study in the Fine Arts School. In the event, he remained there for 27 years. During this period, he was honoured with prizes in exhibitions at Bordeaux and Versailles. Following his return to Greece, he continued taking part in various exhibitions.

He is considered one of the most important Greek artists; his impressionistic landscape paintings in particular are considered exemplary.
