= Giorgos Grammatikakis =

Greek physicist and politician (1939–2023)

- Γιώργος Γραμματικάκης
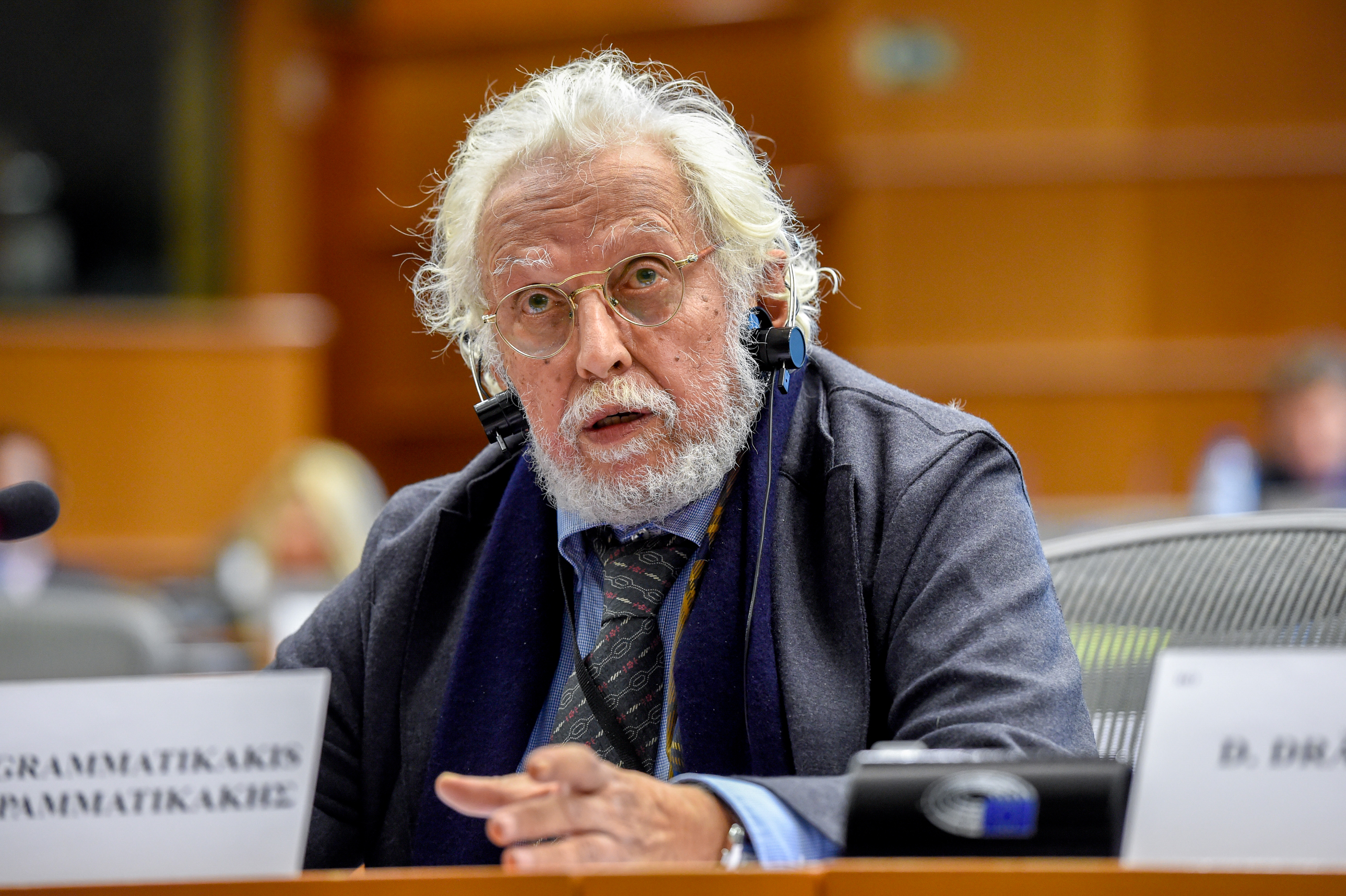

Member of the European Parliament for Greece
- In office 2 July 2014 – 2 July 2019

Personal details
- Born: 21 May 1939; Heraklion, Greece
- Died: 25 October 2023 (aged 84); Heraklion, Greece
- Resting place: Agios Konstantinos Cemetery, Heraklion
- Political party: To Potami
- Spouse: Eva Grammatikaki
- Children: 2
- Profession: Physicist

Giorgos Grammatikakis (Greek: Γιώργος Γραμματικάκης; 21 May 1939 – 25 October 2023) was a Greek physicist, writer, and the dean emeritus of the University of Crete. In 2014, he was elected as a member of the European Parliament (MEP).

== Life ==
Giorgos Grammatikakis was born in Heraklion, Greece on 21 May 1939.

=== Academic career ===
He studied Physics at the University of Athens and at the Imperial College London. In 1982, he was appointed professor of Physics at the University of Crete. Interested in the structure of matter and cosmology, he was engaged in the NESTOR Project, an international scientific collaboration to deploy a neutrino telescope on the sea floor off Pylos. In 1990 he was elected rector of the University of Crete. He was reelected in 1993. Grammatikakis also served as chairman of the Ionian University in Corfu. On 26 May 2010, he was honoured by the Hellenic Physical Society for his contributions to education and science.

Grammatikakis was a successful author of popular science books on cosmology and physics:

- "Η κόμη της Βερενίκης", 1990/2006, ISBN 960-7309-24-3, made into a TV series "Αναζητώντας την Βερενίκη" by ERT1.
- "Κοσμογραφήματα", 1999, ISBN 960-7478-26-6
- "Η αυτοβιογραφία του φωτός", 2006, ISBN 960-524-207-9, English translation, 2024, ISBN 978-3-031-56916-6 ISBN 978-3-031-56917-3
- "Συνομιλίες με το φως", 2009, ISBN 978-960-6882-01-2
- "Ένας αστρολάβος του ουρανού και της ζωής", 2012, ISBN 978-960-524-394-4

Grammatikakis was a member of the board of directors of the former state-owned broadcasting corporation ERT and was vice president of the Greek National Opera.

=== Member of the European Parliament ===
In the 2014 European Parliament election, he was elected as one of two MEPs on the list of the newly founded political party The River. He affiliated with the parliamentary group of the Progressive Alliance of Socialists and Democrats (S&D) and was a member of the Committee on Culture and Education and the Delegation to the EU-Russia Parliamentary Cooperation Committee.

=== Death ===
After a brief hospitalization due to respiratory failure, Grammatikakis died in his hometown, Heraklion, on 25 October 2023, at the age of 84. His funeral took place on 27 October at the Metropolitan Cathedral of Agios Minas. His remains were interred in the cemetery of Agios Konstantinos in Heraklion on the same day.
