= Dimitris Varos =

Greek poet, journalist, and photographer

Dimitris Varos (Greek: Δημήτρης Βάρος; 1949 – 7 September 2017, Athens) was a Greek poet, journalist, and photographer.

== Career ==
He has been director and editor-in-chief of many Greek national newspapers, including Chiakos Laos, Acropolis, Ethnos, Proti, Ethnos tis Kyriakis, Typos tis Kyriakis and many national magazines. He was the director of print and electronic publications at Technoekdotiki that publishes 7 monthly magazines.

Dimitris Varos was also the creator of a number of printing media in Greece such as "Ethnos tis Kyriakis", "TV Ethnos", "Time Out", "Ergasia", "New Gen", "IQ", "Pame Athina", "Relax", "Helliniki Naftiliaki", "Kefaleo", "Car & Truck", "Logistics & management", "Ecotec" and others.

As a poet he published four books and his poetry was translated into English. Parts of one of those books (“Thirasia”) were set to music by Greek composer Giannis Markopoulos in his music CDs “Electric Theseus”, “Unities”, “Daring Communications”, “50 years" Giannis Markopoulos and performed by Pavlos Sidiropoulos and the group “Nei Epivates” in the ancient theater Herodion in Athens. Lyrics of Dimitris Varos were also used by rock group “Vox” in their third CD.

== Publications ==
- We are Greeks. 2012, Bookstars Editions. ISBN 9786185015244 Humour
- Phryne (Φρύνη). 2000, Kastaniotis Editions. ISBN 960-03-2821-8 Greek poetry
- Thirasia (Θηρασία). 1997, Kastaniotis Editions. ISBN 960-03-1902-2 Greek poetry
- Andromeda (Ανδρομέδα), Chios Art-lovers Association Editions. Greek poetry
- O stranger (Ω ξειν), Independent edition. Greek poetry

== Notes ==
<Interview>: http://www.pirenesfountain.com/archives/issue_03/showcase.html
