= Giovanni Giustiniani =

Genoese noble and captain (1418–1453)

Giovanni Giustiniani Longo
- Protostrator
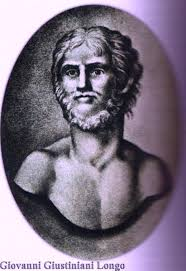
- Image of Giovanni Giustiniani
- Born: 1418
- Died: 1 June 1453 (aged 34-35)
- Wars and battles: Fall of Constantinople

Giovanni Giustiniani Longo (Greek: Ιωάννης Λόγγος Ιουστινιάνης, romanized: Iōánnēs Lóngos Ioustiniánēs; Latin: Iovianus Iustinianus Longus; 1418 – 1 June 1453) was a Genoese nobleman, mercenary captain, and defender of Constantinople during its siege in 1453. He was instrumental in its defense and commanded 700 men, as well as leading the land forces protecting the city.

== Family and early life ==
Giustiniani was a member of the powerful House of Giustiniani and was probably native to the island of Chios. Although little is known of his origin, Giustiniani was known to be a mercenary soldier, which indicates that he was likely not the first born son of his family, as mercenary nobles typically chose that life due to not being owed the family inheritance.

== The state of Byzantium in 1400 ==
The Eastern Roman Empire, also known as the Byzantine Empire, had endured from 330 AD all the way to the fifteenth century. While it was originally a major power in the Eastern Mediterranean that outlasted many neighboring and competing empires, it had declined significantly in both influence and territory approaching the middle of the fifteenth century. Its many conflicts with neighboring states had seen its borders slowly pushed back. The loss that had the most influence on the state of Byzantium at the time of its fall was its temporary dissolution in 1204 when European crusaders conquered the city of Constantinople and drove the remaining Byzantine loyalists out of their seat of power. Though it was eventually reclaimed, and imperial authority restored, it would decidedly put an end to Byzantium's status as a major military power. Byzantium now only retained limited regional influence and had to contend with an Islamist neighbor known as the Ottoman Empire looking to expand west into their territory.

By the time of the final siege of Constantinople, the Byzantine Empire had been reduced to a single city. A city that, while impressively resilient against attack, had been sacked and conquered before by both internal Byzantine rebellions and the aforementioned crusaders. What made those conquests different than what the Byzantines faced in 1453 is that Byzantium had other land still under their control to regroup in and launch a re-conquest from. In 1453, there was essentially nothing else but Constantinople; No buffer territory before the city and neither the resources nor the staging ground to retake the city if it was lost. Their ability to set up defenses against future attacks were also heavily hampered due to the fact that the empire was financially in a crisis and was unable to raise money through taxation because of Venetian resident's threats of evacuation if trade was further taxed which would have crippled its economy. Furthermore, the harsh conditions created in the city due to the previously listed factors had created factionalism. This ranged from religious and ethnic tensions to the formation of outright loyalist and separatist factions. By the time of the siege, there were pro-Byzantines, pro-Ottomans and neutral factions all occupying the same city.

== Opposing forces ==
The final factor that sets up the context of the state of Constantinople was the death of Ottoman Sultan Murad II, who had pursued a generally peaceful coexistence with Byzantium towards the end of his life. When he died, his son Mehmed II succeeded him and with a new ruler came a new Ottoman foreign diplomacy policy regarding the Byzantine Empire, though this change would only come after an initial renewal of the peace treaty between the two empires.

== Mercenary demand and motives ==
Giustiniani's presence during the defense can be deduced by the state of Italian city state rivalries and how it drove Italian mercenaries abroad. When there was conflict within what would be constituted as modern-day Italy between city states, the employment of mercenaries was not only commonplace, but the preferred method of fielding soldiers. But with the conflicts within Italy somewhat winding down and the local governments shifting to standing armies, the need for mercenaries in Italy had essentially dried up. In order to continue operating in large mercenary companies, Italian soldiers for hire would have to hire themselves out to foreign conflicts wherever there happened to be fighting and a side willing to hire them. Furthermore, for the mercenaries from the Italian city-states, Christian Byzantines made practical sense as an avenue for their employment; both for money and the shared religion.

Though practical business needs likely accounted for most mercenaries that ended up in Constantinople, there are also other rationales which likely drew mercenaries into service. The city hosted a rather large Venetian civilian population, and smaller populations from the region such as a neighborhood of Genoese civilians. For a Venetian or Genoese mercenary, it was very likely to have prior relationships within Constantinople; and this applied to any group who had a section of their population within Constantinople. As a result, mercenaries could be drawn to the job not only by the practical needs of their job, but also a need to protect people they knew. Furthermore, there is a precedent for mercenary nobles convicted of crimes to be sent to defend a Christian stronghold in order to seek redemption. While Giovanni Giustiniani, the mercenary put in charge of Constantinople's defense, never left a surviving testimony as to why he elected to serve at the Siege of Constantinople, we can deduce that much like other mercenaries at the time the context behind his decision had to do with one or several of these three explanations. Reportedly, the emperor Constantine XI had promised him sovereignty over the island of Lemnos in case of victory.

The Byzantine Empire had a long history of dealing with internal rebellions from native born military officers. This trend of rebellion alongside a streak of seeming incompetence bred active distrust between the Emperor and his military officers. As a result of which the Byzantines had begun heavily relying on mercenaries from the thirteenth century onwards. Although rebellions by mercenaries were not an uncommon occurrence, the frequency was considerably less than native born rebellions. That may be a possible reason for his promotion as the leader of the defense instead of a native-born officer; both fear of rebellion and two centuries of trust built hired mercenary officers. In addition, the thirteenth century was the advent of military professionalism in mercenary companies that transformed them from simple sell sword hordes to groups of professional soldiers with an updated understanding of the modern military technology. With that in mind, it is reasonable to assume that the Emperor sought a mercenary to lead the defense not only due to trust issues, but also a professional mercenary was more likely to understand military technology vital to properly organize the defense.

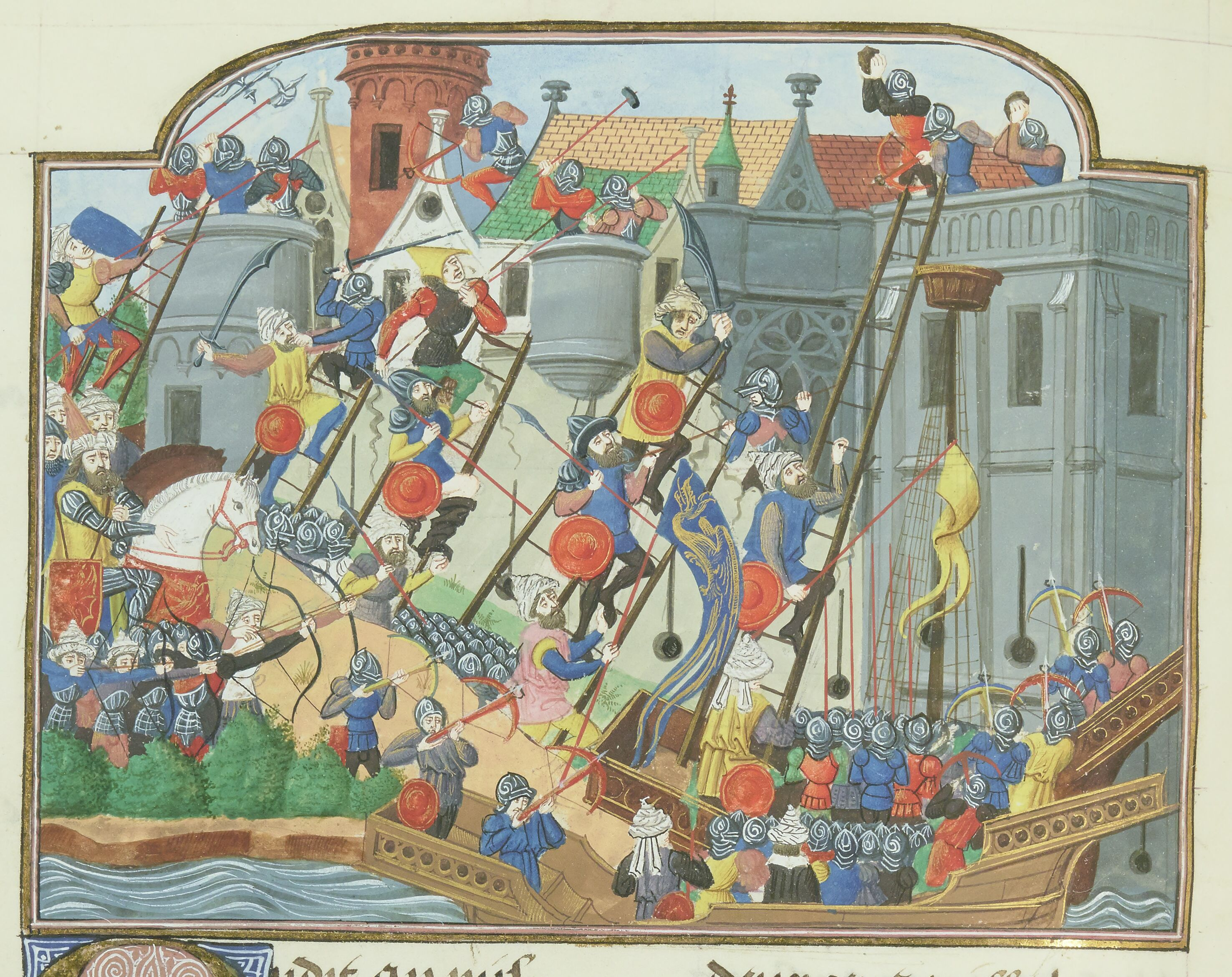
Siege of Constantinople as depicted after the event

== Siege of Constantinople ==
Upon hearing of the plight of Constantinople, Giustiniani (along with 700 men from Chios and Genoa) sailed to defend the city, arriving in late January to prepare for the siege. Constantine XI strategically placed this contingent to the right of his own position, and appointed Giustiniani to the rank of Protostrator. This placed him as the leader of the city's defense, and while it is clear why such a position would go to a mercenary, it is less clear why Giustiniani specifically was selected. One potential explanation comes from the fact that many of the defenders present were Venetian and there was also a quite large Venetian civilian population that was discontent with Constantine's rule. The last time the city fell out of Byzantine control is when a group of European crusaders, that had many Venetians among them, took it in 1204. So, it is not out of the question that Constantine was wary of selecting a Venetian to lead the defense in case they attempted a military coup with civilian support afterwards. Following this line of logic, Giustiniani was from The Republic of Genoa, which the Venetians seemed to be prejudiced against. Selecting Giustiniani meant that Constantine had a Protostrator who would not aid the Venetians in the event they attempted to launch a coup, and that they also would find themselves with fewer volunteers to assist in their own potential coup as there were comparatively fewer Genoese mercenaries and civilians than Venetians.

Once selected as Protostrator, he was tasked with training soldiers, reinforcing fortifications, and generally preparing for the imminent attack. Learning from the siege of 1422, he directed the defense efforts at the outer walls, with Archbishop Leonardo di Chio's suggestion that the inner walls defence would not be prioritized due to their supposed disrepair. During this stage, there was no manpower deficiency, though it became clear that there would only be 8,000-9,000 people to defend Constantinople. Noting that the city lacked funds to pay its defenders, Constantine used church jewelry and silverware to mint coins to pay the soldiers. Giustiniani was placed on the right of the most strategic and lowest lying section of the walls, between St. Romanos and Charisius. Immediately, he reorganised the army, trained the city's recruits in modern weaponry, and removed men who had fled to monasteries with the hope of escaping military duties, instead directing them to Constantinople's defensive efforts. Giustiniani also reinforced the wall's most critical points with his 700 Genoese mercenaries.

Upon Sultan Mehmed's arrival on April 6, Giustiniani began commanding sorties to counterattack the Ottoman position. These are recorded as being very successful, and resulted in the destruction of Ottoman troops, siege works and artillery. However, sorties were gradually abandoned due to their high death rates. His approach regarding wall repairs was also a hindrance to the Ottomans; his strategy involved cushioning the blow of artillery fire by covering the walls in soft surfaces, and then filling gaps created by cannonballs with debris (which turned out to be highly effective as the cannonballs would simply sink into the rubble). This tactic was impressive both due to its effectiveness given his limited resources, but also the fact this was his first time actively defending against the range and quantity of artillery the Ottomans were using. Giovanni had to contend with a massive, 6-meter-long cannon supported by a few dozen large cannons and 500 smaller artillery pieces, one of the largest artillery barrages in history at the time. The unprecedented nature of the Ottoman artillery meant that Giustiniani likely neither knew the extent of his enemy's artillery nor knew how to defend against artillery on that scale, but rather he came up with defensive plans during the siege. The quick thinking displayed in such a solution likely indicates that Giustiniani's defense was as effective as it was because he was an adaptive leader. Throughout the siege, Giustiniani and his men repaired the damaged walls, plugging gaps with soldiers to repel assaults when necessary. He also made use of small artillery pieces containing grapeshot, projectiles and items to drop on attackers attempting to scale the walls.

The first assault occurred on 18 April, with a detachment of Janissaries and archers being sent towards a breach in the middle section of the walls. Giustiniani and his men were able to repel this attack after 4 hours due to the narrow front — as the breach had been a small one, the Ottoman troops were unable to take advantage of their superior numbers.

By late May, dwindling supplies and manpower coupled with the knowledge that no relief army would save Constantinople caused tensions to run high, and amidst this Giustiniani and Notaras (the Byzantine chief minister) are reported to have had a falling out.

== Death ==
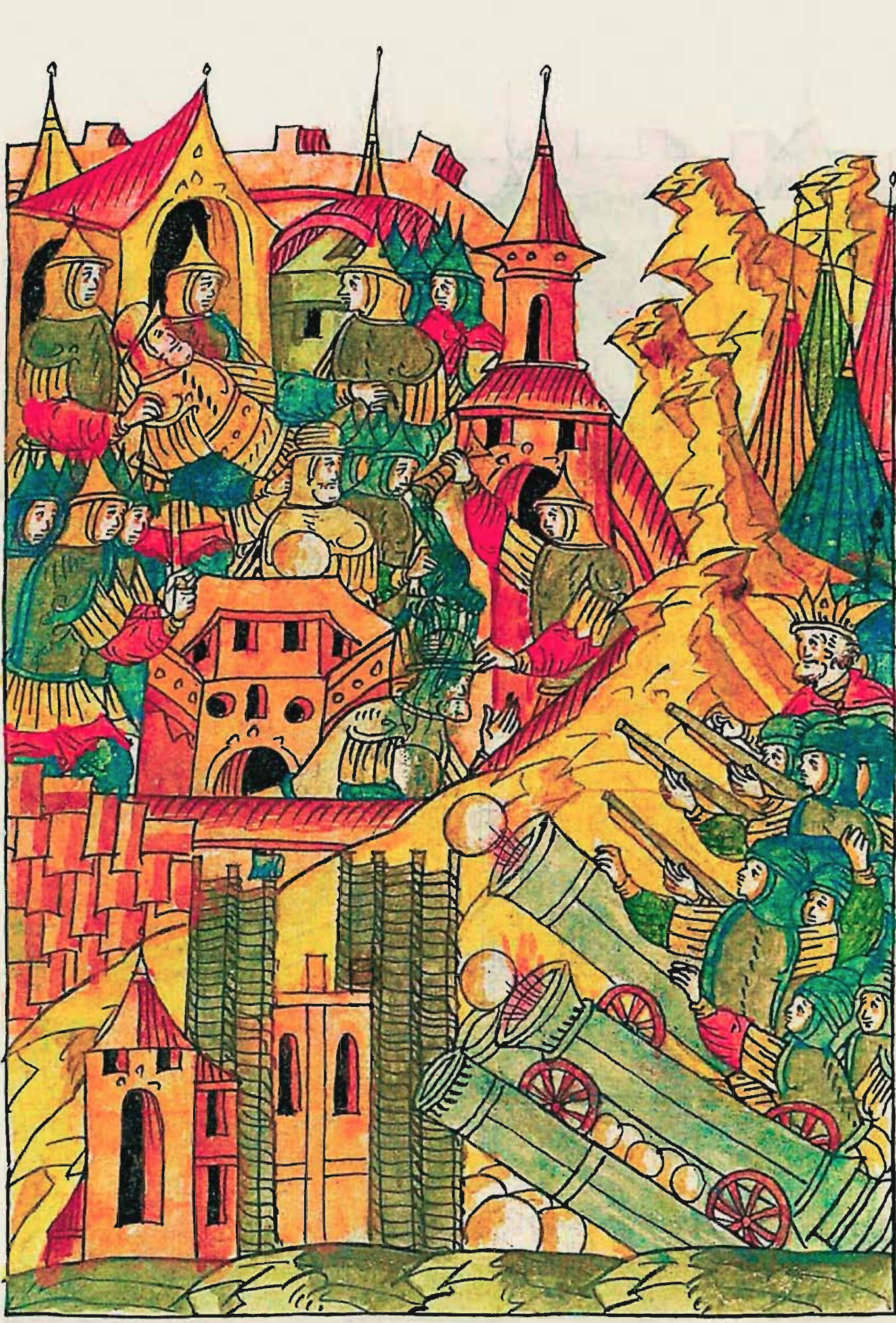
Wounding of Giustiniani during the siege of Constantinople (Russian miniature, 1560s)

In the early hours of 29 May, the final Ottoman assault began, with the most numerous forces concentrated in the center of the walls. The first wave of troops, Christian troops provided by vassals of Mehmed, attempted to scale the improvised stockades erected by Giustiniani's men, but were unsuccessful. A second wave proceeded to attack, most notably at a breach near the St. Romanos gate, but were once again repelled by early morning. The last wave consisted of elite Janissaries, who assaulted the wall and by this point were faced by no more than 3,000 exhausted troops led by Giustiniani.

Giustiniani's downfall came during this assault, when a cannon or crossbow bolt severely wounded his arm, chest or leg, forcing a retreat from his combat station. As he exited the battle, the defenders' morale was severely weakened and men began to flee in panic. Giustiniani was taken to his ship with hopes of his wounds being cared for, and as it became known that Constantinople had fallen, fled alongside his men. Sources hostile towards the Genoese (such as the Venetian Nicolò Barbaro), however, report that he was only lightly wounded or not wounded at all, but, overwhelmed by fear, simulated the wound to abandon the battlefield, determining the fall of the city. These charges of cowardice and treason were so widespread that the Republic of Genoa had to deny them by sending diplomatic letters to the Chancelleries of England, France, the Duchy of Burgundy and others.

Giustiniani succumbed to his wounds on 1 June, and was taken to the Genoese island of Chios. He was laid to rest in the church of San Domenico within the Castle of Chios, on a site today occupied by the former Bayrakli Mosque. His tomb is lost, possibly destroyed in the 1881 earthquake, but several descriptions of its inscription survive.

== Primary sources ==
The most prevalent primary source which mentions Giovanni Giustiniani is Nicolò Barbaro's The Siege of Constantinople in 1453 in which he gives his own eyewitness account of what occurred during the fall of Constantinople. The work covers both the siege itself and the immediate aftermath with Barbaro's biases laid clear upon the page. Giustiniani appears in the text under the name Zuan Zustignan and is portrayed as a coward that fled his post and lied to the populace about the Ottomans breaking in to spread panic. Barbaro's recollection of Giustiniani's defense of the wall is contested by other historians as it is misleading in the details it leaves out and likely false as he is the only source which says that Giustiniani caused mass panic. But due to his source being a primary source, his otherwise accurate depiction of the fall of Constantinople, and his status as being one of the first people to write about Giovanni Giustiniani, his source often merits discussion when Giustiniani is mentioned by name.

== Historiography ==
The first relevant secondary source to Giovanni Giustiniani's story came around in 2006 with William Caferro's John Hawkwood an English Mercenary in Fourteenth-Century Italy. And while it has no direct mention of Giustiniani in it, it does exposit about Italian mercenaries in the fourteenth century and provide some potential background for Giustiniani's life before the fall of Constantinople. It mentions that, in Italy, the practice of mercenary companies had largely fallen out of favor by the 1400s in favor of standing armies and individual captains leading a smaller host of mercenaries. While not being directly about him, it gives more information about how since mercenary work was scarcer in Italy there was a need for travel and what potential organizational structure he fit into before arriving at Constantinople. And the idea that mercenary companies no longer had as good of a chance at business in Italy and thus would have to find work elsewhere is supported by a more convincing source stating that Giustiniani arrived in Constantinople with 700 men; a company's worth. The corroboration between the two sources renders Caferro's thoroughly convincing.

Continuing the trend of tangentially related scholarly releases is the 2009 The Employment of Large Groups of Mercenaries in Byzantium in the Period ca. 1290-1305 as Viewed by the Sources by Savvas Kyriakidis. The record covers the Byzantine habit of largely relying on mercenaries and introduces the logic as to why and some examples of how hiring mercenaries played out for the Byzantines. But the part relevant to Giustiniani is how the record mentions that one of the reasons mercenaries had become such a relied upon force is that the Byzantine leadership lacked trust in native military leaders due to a mixture of incompetence and the threat of rebellion. Which offers insight as to why a mercenary who only arrived recently to the defense may be selected to lead over native officers who would seem to have more of a stake in the cities defense. With the principles laid out in Kyriakidis’ work fitting rather well to Giustiniani's promotion, their argument for Byzantine mercenary reliance becomes very compelling. For a long stretch of time, Giovanni Giustiniani was almost completely absent from the historical record in terms of direct references, with only records about mercenaries offering insight into what those direct references don't say outright.

Though the streak of vocationally related publications would come to an end in 2011 with another direct reference to Giovanni Giustiniani and mark the beginning of more recent interpretations of his role in history. Marios Philippides and Walter Hanak's The Siege and Fall of Constantinople in 1453 Historiography, Topography and Military studies is a book containing a staggeringly comprehensive look at the fall of Constantinople that draws on many original Greek sources. It also mentions Giustiniani quite a few times as it lays out evidence for questions otherwise left unanswered by previous records. Such as explanations of what he was doing before the siege, framing him as a potential corsair, or potentially invited there by the Emperor himself; though the author doesn't seem particularly convinced by the evidence of an invitation. It also takes significant time to rebuff Barbaro's claim that Giustiniani left without being injured, not only directly countering the claim but providing several pages of other sources which cite that he was injured though they differ in how they claim he was hurt. It is thoroughly compelling and well argued. Unfortunately, the fountain of information provided by this text doesn't start a trend, as the next entry which mentions Giovani only passingly mentions him within the greater context of discussing the defense of Constantinople. While the newer interpretations do contest some claims of the previous sources, mostly all they do is expand upon previous information or contain roughly the same amount as previous; there is no real shift in debate.

== Portrayals ==
- Giustiniani is played by Kemal Ergünenç in the Turkish film İstanbul'un Fethi (1951)
- Cengiz Coşkun plays Giustiniani in the Turkish film Fetih 1453 (2012). In the film, he is killed by Ulubatlı Hasan (İbrahim Çelikkol) during the last day in the siege of Constantinople.
- He appears as a protagonist in Andrew Novo's novel Queen of Cities
- He appears as a major character in Mika Waltari's novel The Dark Angel
- He appears as a major character in the historical novel Porphyry and Ash by Peter Sandham
- He is portrayed by Birkan Sokullu in the Turkish historical docuseries Rise of Empires: Ottoman (2020)
- Giovanni Giustiniani was portrayed by Luka Peroš in the Turkish historical series Mehmed: Sultan of Conquests. In the series, he is shown to be in love with Anna Notaras and is killed before the Fall of Constantinople.

== See also ==
- Fall of Constantinople
