= Notaras family =

Greek aristocratic family

The Notaras family is an old Greek aristocratic family.

== History ==
Tracing their origins back to the Byzantine period from Monemvasia, together with Loukas Notaras as the last megas doux of the Byzantine Empire, they gave several religious to the Greek Orthodox Church, several politicians to the Greek kingdom and a dynasty of artists to Romania.

== Notable members ==
- Saint Gerasimus of Kefalonia (1506–1579), patron-saint of Greek island Kefalonia
- Saint Macarius Notaras (1731-1805), Metropolitan of Corinth and co-composer of the Philokalia
- Blessed Dositheus II Notaras (1641–1707), Greek Orthodox Patriarch of Jerusalem
- Chrysanthus Notaras (1655/1660-1731), Patriarch of Jerusalem
- Loukas Notaras (1402–1453), the last megas doux of the Byzantine Empire
- Anna Notaras (died 1507), daughter of Loukas Notaras, the last megas doux of the Byzantine Empire
- Ioannis Notaras (died 1827), general in the Greek War of Independence
- Panoutsos Notaras, political leader in the Greek War of Independence
- Jacob Notaras (c. 1439–1491)
