= Cathedral of St. Nicholas, Chios =

Coordinates: 38°22′22″N 26°07′54″E

Cathedral of St. Nicholas
- Καθεδρικός Ναός Αγίου Νικολάου
- The Cathedral of St. Nicholas in the town of Chios
- Location: Chios, Greece
- Country: Greece
- Denomination: Roman Catholic

History
- Status: Cathedral
- Dedication: Saint Nicholas

Architecture
- Years built: 1720, Rebuilt 1826–1840

Administration
- Diocese: Chios

The Cathedral of St. Nicholas is a Roman Catholic church in the town of Chios, Greece. Dedicated to Saint Nicholas, (Note: Sources differ as to whether the dedication is to Saint Nicholas of Bari or Saint Nicholas of Myra.) it is the cathedral of the Roman Catholic Diocese of Chios.

The present church stands on the site of a former Franciscan church of the same name and has served as the seat of the island's Roman Catholic community since 1720. Destroyed during the massacres of 1822, it was rebuilt over the following decades, the reconstruction being completed in 1840.

== Background ==
Under Genoese rule the Roman Catholic community of Chios centred on a cathedral within the Castle of Chios, the fortified quarter on the north side of the harbour. The cathedral in use at the time of the Ottoman conquest of 1566 was dedicated to Saints Peter and Paul. After the Catholics were displaced from the Kastro around the time of the failed Florentine raid of 1599, the sacraments were administered in the suburban church of Santa Maria di Travena; in 1613 the Ottomans converted Saints Peter and Paul into a mosque, and Santa Maria di Travena became the cathedral. Santa Maria was in turn converted into a mosque following the Ottoman return after the brief Venetian occupation, leaving the Catholic community without a cathedral.

== Franciscan church ==
The Franciscans were established in Chios by 1369. By 1555 they held a church of San Nicolò in Katoparichia, one of the suburbs outside the Kastro. In the closing years of the sixteenth century the church was given to the order by Pantaleo Cosma, who had bought it from the Orthodox into whose hands it had passed. A bequest by Pupussa Canessa, the income from which was intended for the upkeep of San Nicolò, became the subject of prolonged litigation between the Observant Franciscans, the Jesuits and the episcopal court in the early seventeenth century.

San Nicolò remained the principal church of the Franciscans, passing from the Observants to the Riformati by 1667. After the Ottoman reconquest of the island in 1695 its walls and roof were destroyed and the site was confiscated to the Sultan's treasury.

== Establishment as the cathedral ==
Proposals to make San Nicolò the Catholic cathedral were put forward in 1706 and 1718. Permission to rebuild on the site of the Franciscan church was granted in April 1720, (Note: The date of the firman is recorded as either 20 April or 26 April 1720.) a concession generally credited to the imperial envoy Graf von Virmont. The Catholic community came to regard the emperor Charles VI as the restorer of its liberties, with some credit also given to the Chian exile Saverio Giustiniani. (Note: Most accounts place the rebuilt cathedral on the site of the former Franciscan church of San Nicolò, though one locates the third Catholic cathedral of Chios in Frangoparichia.)

The cost of construction far exceeded the community's resources. The burden was placed on twenty leading men, from whom varying sums were demanded by twelve assessors, and disputes followed when several of those assessed secured the protection of powerful Ottomans and refused to pay. In 1737 the bishop and community appealed to Pope Clement XII for help in paying off the debts incurred during the building works. Under Ottoman rule the cathedral was the only parish church of the town of Chios, its clergy installed and removed by the bishop at his discretion.

== Destruction and reconstruction ==
The cathedral was burnt during the massacres of 1822. Two years later the French vice-consul persuaded the Pasha to remove the Ottoman tradesmen who had occupied its approaches. Permission to rebuild was secured in 1826—reportedly through bribery—while the Franciscan church of San Antonio served as the parish church in the interim; the bishop is said to have officiated in the Capuchin chapel after 1836. The reconstruction of the cathedral was completed in 1840, under Bishop Ignazio Giustiniani. Some fittings from the earlier church were preserved in the rebuilt cathedral.

The church was badly damaged by the earthquake of 1881 and was subsequently repaired by Fidele Abbate. In that earthquake the Catholic community, by then much reduced in size, lost only five of its members.

== Architecture and interior ==
The church is of a single-nave plan. Its high altar is dedicated to Saint Nicholas of Myra, patron of sailors, and bears a Western-style image of the saint vested as a bishop. Two side altars are dedicated respectively to the Dormition of the Virgin and to the Crucifixion together with Saint Anthony of Padua. To the right of the altar stands the episcopal throne, bearing the arms of Bishop Nikolaos Charikiopoulos (1917–1939).

Several pieces survive from the earlier, Genoese-era church. The most notable is a grey marble tabernacle, an inscription on which records that it was made for Giovanni Antonio Campi-Giustiniani in 1462; its front is carved in relief with an ogival crocketed niche flanked by twisted Corinthian columns and a tympanum depicting the enthroned Christ, a composition resembling work in the church of Santa Maria di Castello at Genoa. A vestry of the cathedral holds a low marble relief of the Virgin and Child beneath a shell canopy, of markedly Byzantine character and probably the work of a local sculptor of the late Genoese period or later, while above the outer gate are reused reliefs of cherubs in bluish marble, apparently taken from a building of the late fifteenth century.

Above the main entrance is a choir loft containing a French-built harmonium that reached Chios in the early twentieth century. The cathedral also holds a collection of relics.

== Present day ==
The Cathedral of St. Nicholas remains the cathedral and parish church of the Latin Church Diocese of Chios, a suffragan see in the ecclesiastical province of Naxos, Andros, Tinos and Mykonos. The diocese has had no resident bishop since the death of Nikolaos Charikopoulos in 1939 and has since been governed by apostolic administrators; since 2021 the role has been held by Josif Printezis, Archbishop of Naxos, Andros, Tinos and Mykonos. The Catholic community of the island is small, and the cathedral continues to serve as its principal place of worship.

== Bibliography ==
- Argenti, Philip P. (1970). The Religious Minorities of Chios: Jews and Roman Catholics. New York: Cambridge University Press.
- Hasluck, F. W. (1910). "The Latin Monuments of Chios". The Annual of the British School at Athens. 16: 137–184. JSTOR 30096437.
