= Castle of Chios =

Medieval citadel on the Greek island of Chios

- Κάστρο της Χίου
- Chios, North Aegean
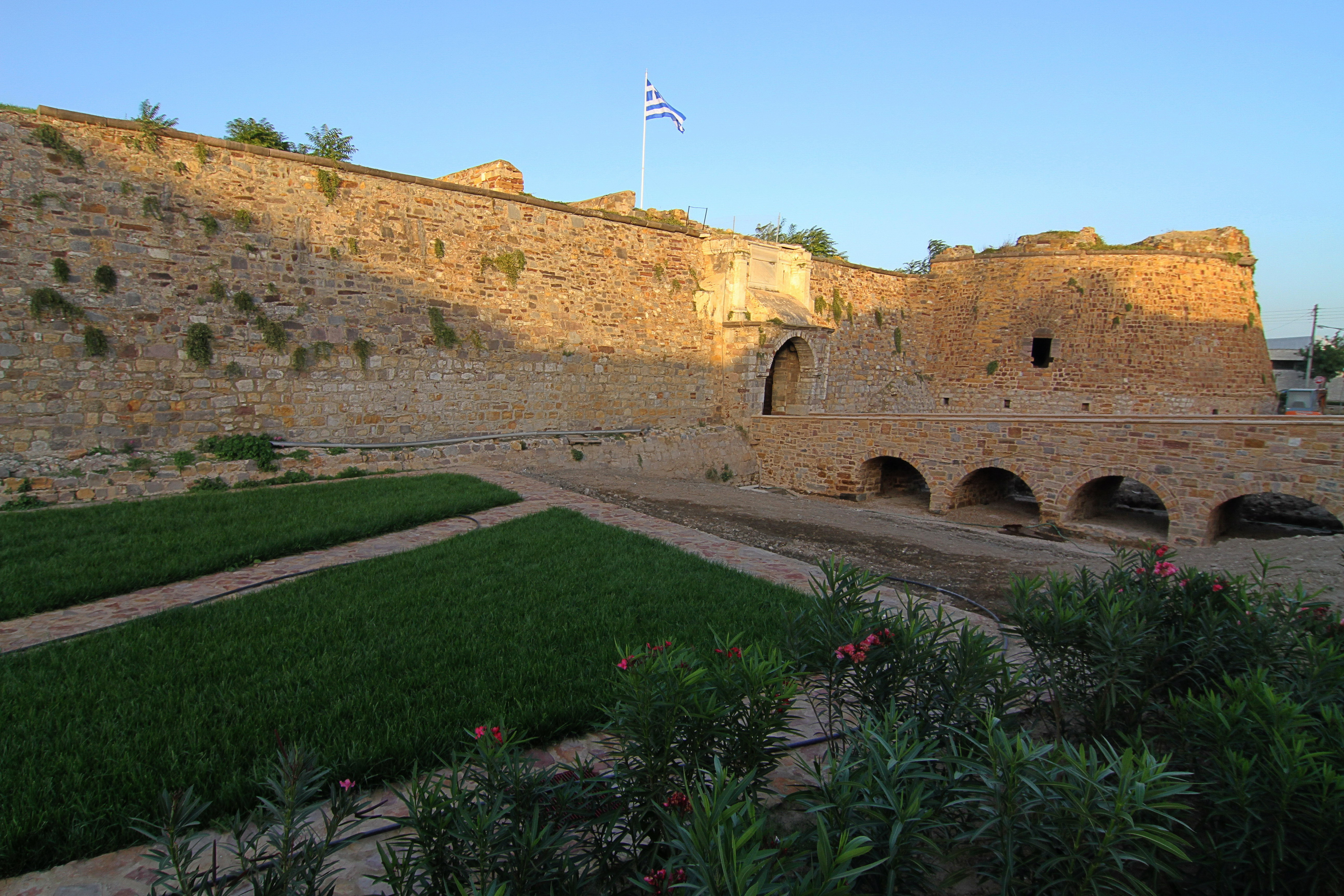
- View from outside the castle (2013)

Site information
- Type: citadel
- Owner: Greek Ministry of Culture
- Controlled by: Byzantine Empire 10th century–1204, 1225–1304, 1329–1346; Zaccaria family1305–1329; Republic of Genoa 1346–1566; Republic of Venice 1694–1695; Ottoman Empire 1566–1912
- Open to the public: Yes
- Condition: Preserved

Location
- Location within Greece
- Coordinates: 38.374°N 26.137°E

Site history
- Built by: Byzantine Empire
- Materials: hewn stone (ashlar)

The Castle of Chios is a medieval citadel in Chios town on the Greek island of Chios.

== Layout and history ==
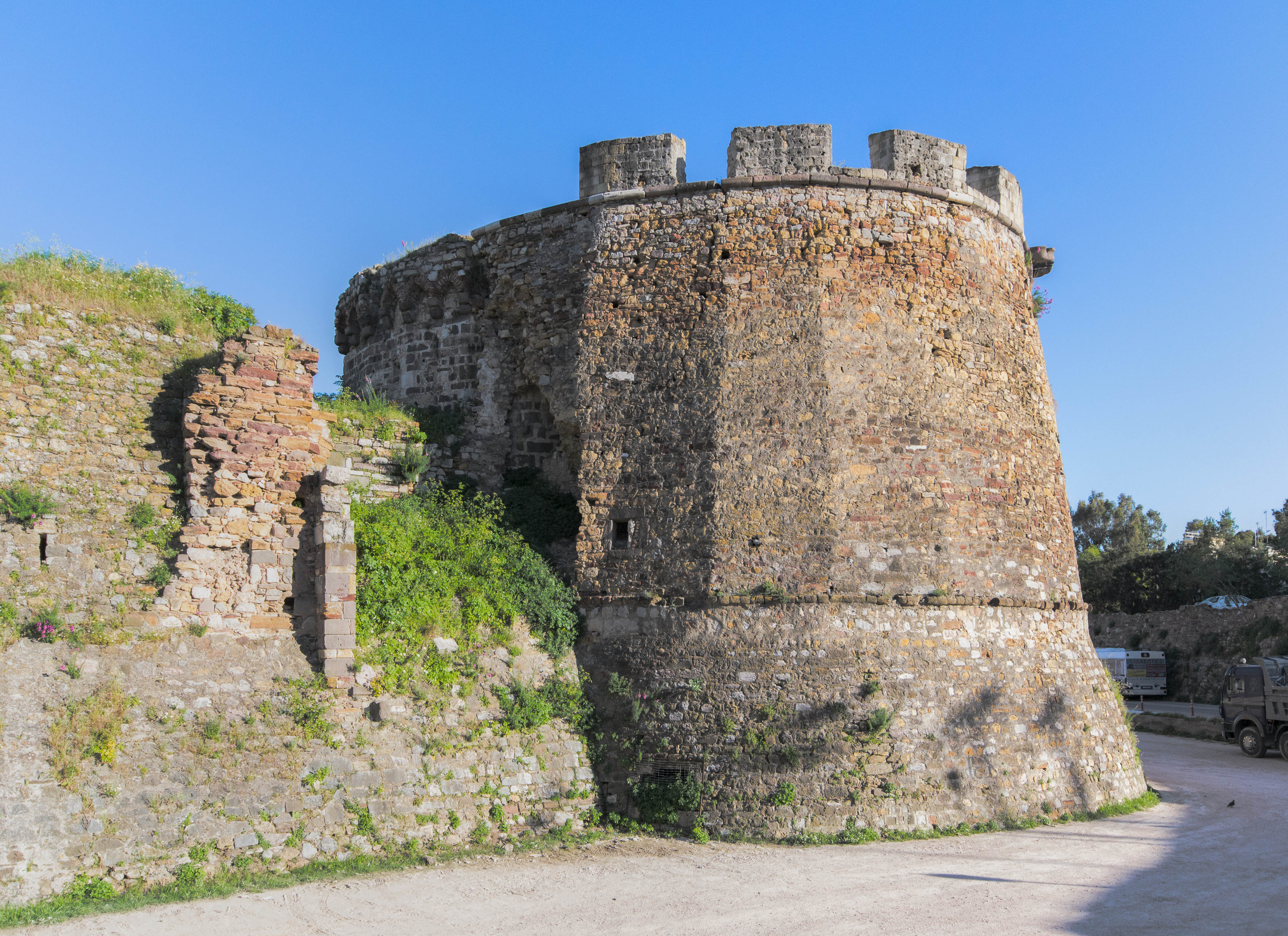
Eastern tower of the Genoese castle in Chios (2012).

The castle stands at the northern end of the harbour, which originally extended as far as its southern wall. Its eastern side fronts the sea, while the northern and western sides are of greater thickness and were defended by a wide artificial moat, now dry. The building is low and solidly constructed of reddish-brown local stone. It consists of an inhabited area surrounded by a large stone wall structure with various fortifications purposed to defend the enclosed population and properties against naval attack and siege.

The castle was first constructed in the medieval period, with an initial phase begun in the 10th century by the Byzantines. The structures surviving today belong to later construction and expansion carried out when the Genoese, who held commercial concerns on the island, ruled it during the 14th to 16th centuries. The surviving fortifications date from the Genoese and Venetian periods; the earliest date recorded by inscription is 1404, and the latest before the Ottoman conquest is 1522.

A fundamental topographical distinction is presumed between the Kastro—the fortified area on the north side of the harbour, inhabited by the garrison, officials and, in the earlier period, much of the Genoese aristocracy, together with the Jewish community—and the borghi, the districts of the town lying outside the castle walls.

=== Construction and sieges ===
The walls of the castle collapsed in an earthquake in 1389, which also damaged many of the houses within it. The defences were rebuilt from their foundations in 1401 and 1402, the work being entrusted to the Ragusan architect Leonardo d'Andrea, who raised a second wall within the first, constructed a triple outwork and excavated a double moat. The walls were patched up repeatedly throughout the Genoese period. (Note: The fortifications were further strengthened around 1427, according to an inscription formerly in the fortress recorded by later writers.)

The Genoese garrison withstood a major Venetian assault in 1430, after which the castle—and especially the walls facing the harbour—was again extensively refortified, reportedly at a cost of 100,000 scudi financed by Genoa as a loan to the Giustiniani. The rebuilt walls of reddish local stone were ringed by a stronger moat and furnished with towers (torrioni), mortar emplacements and other defensive works of the newer type. (Note: Sources differ on the date of the Venetian attempt. One account places a Venetian assault under Andrea Mocenigo in 1430; another dates the Venetian attempt to capture Chios to 1431, when the bombardment of the walls by five heavy mortars quickly reduced the older outer walls, after which the defenders withdrew behind inner walls built in 1401 and protected by a double moat, and successfully resisted; a third refers to the reconstruction "alla moderna" as having followed the siege of 1433.) This reconstruction included a refacing of the northern and western walls, the inner towers predating the work, while the perpendicular sea and harbour walls were left untouched. Further fortification work was carried out in 1522, as recorded by an inscription on the wall facing the harbour.

The castle had three main gates: the Porta Maggiore on the site of the present entrance, described as a triple gate; the northern postern, built or rebuilt in 1522; and a water-gate on the harbour, known only from prints and early descriptions. The harbour itself was defended by two small forts at the ends of the moles, one of which, later known as the Burdj, served the garrison during the siege of 1827.

=== Venetian occupation of 1694–1695 ===
In September 1694 a Venetian fleet under Antonio Zeno captured Chios, holding it until February 1695. The Venetians found that the Turks had done nothing to keep the fortifications up to date, and set about reconstructing the defences. Because only one tower was wide enough to accommodate heavy artillery, the towers at the north-east (afterwards called the "Torrione Zeno") and south-west were rebuilt, the parapets of the northern and western walls raised and strengthened, and the main gate rebuilt, probably preserving its original lines as a triple gate. A planned series of earthworks beyond the moat was abandoned for lack of time. The Venetian bombardment caused considerable ruin among the houses within the citadel.

=== Saint George's church ===
Aghiou Georgiou Frouriou (Saint George of the Fortress) Church is located on the main street of the castle, Aghiou Georgiou Frouriou street. There was initially a Byzantine church on the site, dating back to the 10th or 11th century. During the Genoese period the castle contained a parish church of San Giorgio, which gave its name to a district of the town and was extensively repaired and altered in 1520. Piyale Pasha, an Ottoman admiral, converted the building into the Eski ("Old") Mosque upon the Ottoman capture of the island in 1566. The mosque was reconstructed after the 1881 earthquake and later became the contemporary church of Aghios Georgios.

=== Bayrakli Mosque ===
The Bayrakli Mosque (also called the Hamidiye Mosque), a smaller former mosque within the citadel, has been identified as probably occupying the site of the Genoese church of San Domenico, later known as Santa Maria di Castello. According to a copy of an inscription formerly in that church, the Genoese commander Giovanni Giustiniani Longo, a defender of Constantinople in 1453, was buried there. The present mosque building dates to 1891–1892.

=== Turkish baths ===
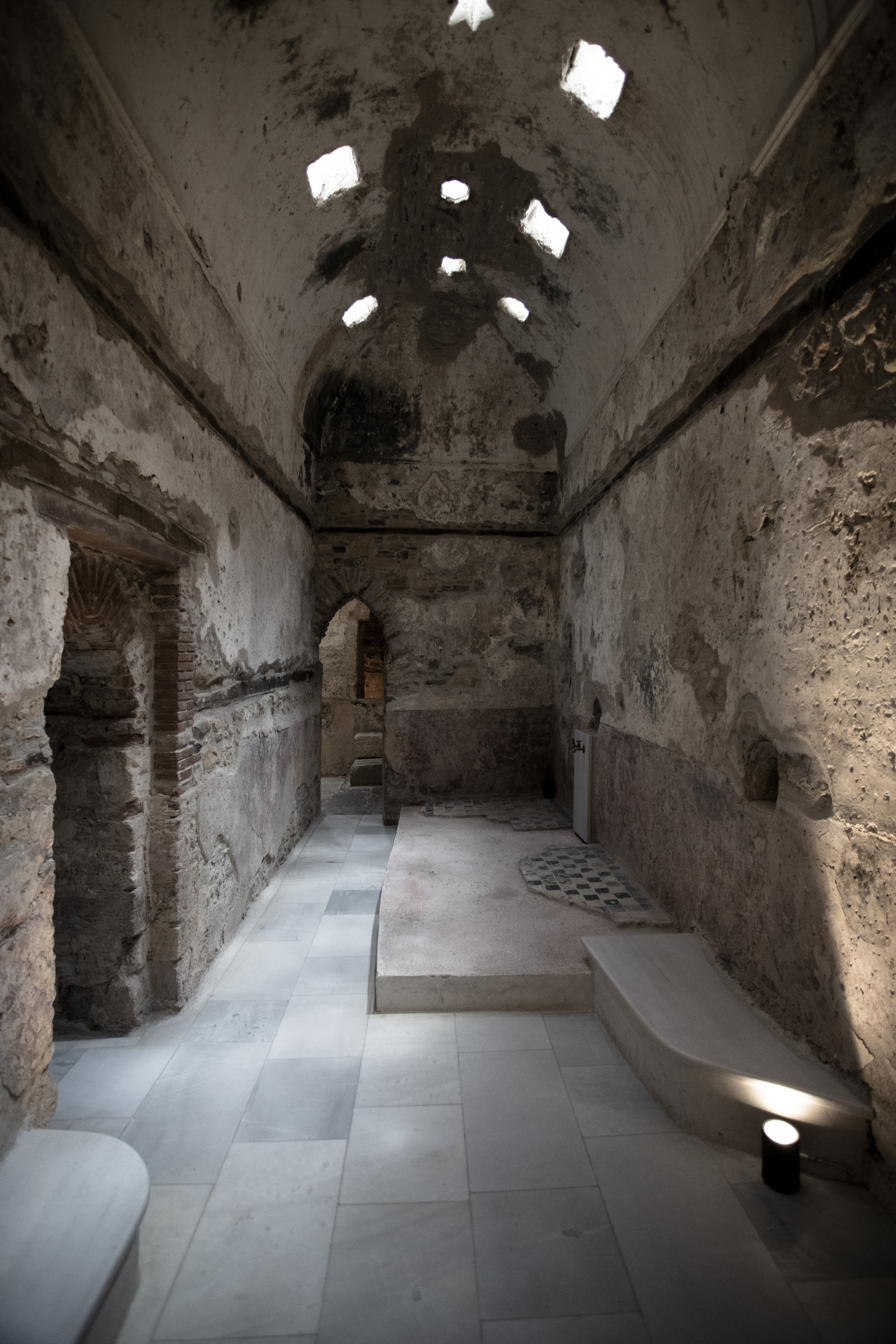
Ottoman baths (corridor)

In the north of the castle area, there are Turkish baths with typical vaulted roofs. Just after the entrance, the Kria Vrisi tank is on the right hand. It is a large semi-underground water reservoir with vaults forming four quarters divided by a cross on its roof that is supported by eight shafts. Then Chian press of the time mentions that in 1920 the Mayor of Chios and architect Dim. Tselepidis had set out its cleaning. “The pumping of water was originally performed through a large dome-roofed elevated arcade that was extending all along the eastern part of the tank and later on through a short cistern in its southeast corner.” Professor Char. Bouras mentioned about the tank.

== See also ==
- Giovanni Giustiniani
