= Anna Notaras =

Greek printer (died 1507)

Anna Notaras Palaiologina (Greek: Ἄννα Νοταρᾶ Παλαιολογίνα; died 8 July 1507) was a prominent Byzantine leader-in-exile in decades following the fall of Constantinople in 1453, serving as a center of the Greek community in Venice in the late 15th and early 16th century.

Anna was a daughter of Loukas Notaras, the last megas doux of the Byzantine Empire. Some documents also refer to her as widow of the last emperor, Constantine XI Palaiologos, though contemporary documents makes no mention of such a marriage.

== Background ==
Anna Notaras Palaiologina was born into the wealthy Byzantine aristocracy when the Byzantine Empire was at its point of terminal decline. Her father was Loukas Notaras, one of the richest noblemen and a high official in the empire. Loukas served as the empire's last megas doux, under emperors John VIII Palaiologos and Constantine XI Palaiologos. Loukas Notaras died in the aftermath of the fall of Constantinople in 1453.

It is not clear when Anna left Constantinople. Donald Nicol believes she was sent away by her father to Rome for safety some years prior to 1453, alongside her sisters Theodora and Euphrosyne. It is also possible that she fled from the fall of Constantinople itself; the passenger manifest of a Genoese ship which escaped the siege on the morning of 29 May 1453 includes two entries for the family name Notaras.

== Life in Italy ==
Anna's exact whereabouts before 1459 are not certain, but in that year she appeared in Italy and made claim to the Notaras family inheritance, held at the Bank of Saint George in Genoa. The fate of this large inheritance had become a diplomatic question during the six years following the death of Loukas Notaras. She had her younger brother, Jacob Notaras, disinherited on the grounds that he had converted to Islam while in captivity. She lived for a time in Rome before eventually settling in Venice, where she became the center of the Greek community in Venice.

She repeatedly petitioned the Republic to allow the construction of an Orthodox church within Venice (something not granted until 1539) and when the Council of Ten prevaricated, she badgered them into a compromise, allowing her to build an oratory within her own sizable Casa and hold Orthodox services within it from 1475. In 1498, the Venetian Senate finally granted their Greek community the right to found the Scuola di San Nicolò dei Greci, a confraternity which aided members of that community. Although Anna Notaras died in 1507, prior to the completion of San Giorgio dei Greci, she left three icons in her will to the church, where they remain today.

In 1499, the first exclusively Greek printing press in Venice began operation under the direction of Nikolaos Vlasto and Zacharias Kalliergis. The first product of the press was the Etymologicum Magnum and the dedication at the front thanks the ‘most modest lady Anna, daughter of…Loukas Notaras’ who had defrayed its cost.

In 1472 Anna began negotiations with the council of Siena to take possession of the old castle of Montauto and the surrounding lands in order to found a commune where Greeks could live "according to their laws and customs". In their correspondence with her, the council referred to her as the widow of the last Byzantine emperor, Constantine XI Palaiologos (r. 1449–1453), but this was untrue. There is no mention of such a marriage in any other contemporary source, especially in the writings of George Sphrantzes, his chancellor. Although the legal contract was drawn up, the commune project went no further.

A friend of Cardinal Bessarion, Anna also recovered several Greek manuscripts from the east. In 1470 she acquired a 12th-century manuscript Catena of Job written for the Grand Duke of Cyprus. On March 2, 1489, Zabeta, widow of her brother Jacob, filed a petition before the judges of the Venetian Procurator alleging that Jacob had shortly before his death in Ancona, sent to his sister Anna "a box of law books of different kinds, both on parchment and on paper" of great value. She demanded that Anna hand over these works to her, or be ordered to pay her the sum of 120 ducats. Anna acknowledged receipt of this box but contended that most of the books had actually been bought by herself and been lent to Jacob. Anna won this court case and on 8 May 1490, Anna filed a petition against Zabeta, alleging that she had entered the Ca Notaras and stolen a valuable copy of Petrarch, which Anna had bought from Thomas Palaiologos in 1462, during his visit to Venice, which she valued at 51 ducats. The judge ruled in Anna's favour again.

== Fictional portrayals ==
- Anna Notaras appears as a central character in The Dark Angel by Mika Waltari - where she fictionally dies, dressed in a soldier's clothes, during the final battle of the Fall of Constantinople.
- She also appears in Porphyry and Ash by Peter Sandham.
- Emel Özcan plays Anna in the Turkish series Mehmed: Fetihler Sultanı, where it's shown she had an affair with Giovanni Giustiniani but had to end up marrying Demetrios Palaiologos after her lover's death.
