= Osmaniye Mosque =

Former mosque in Chios, Greece

- Τζαμί Οσμανιέ
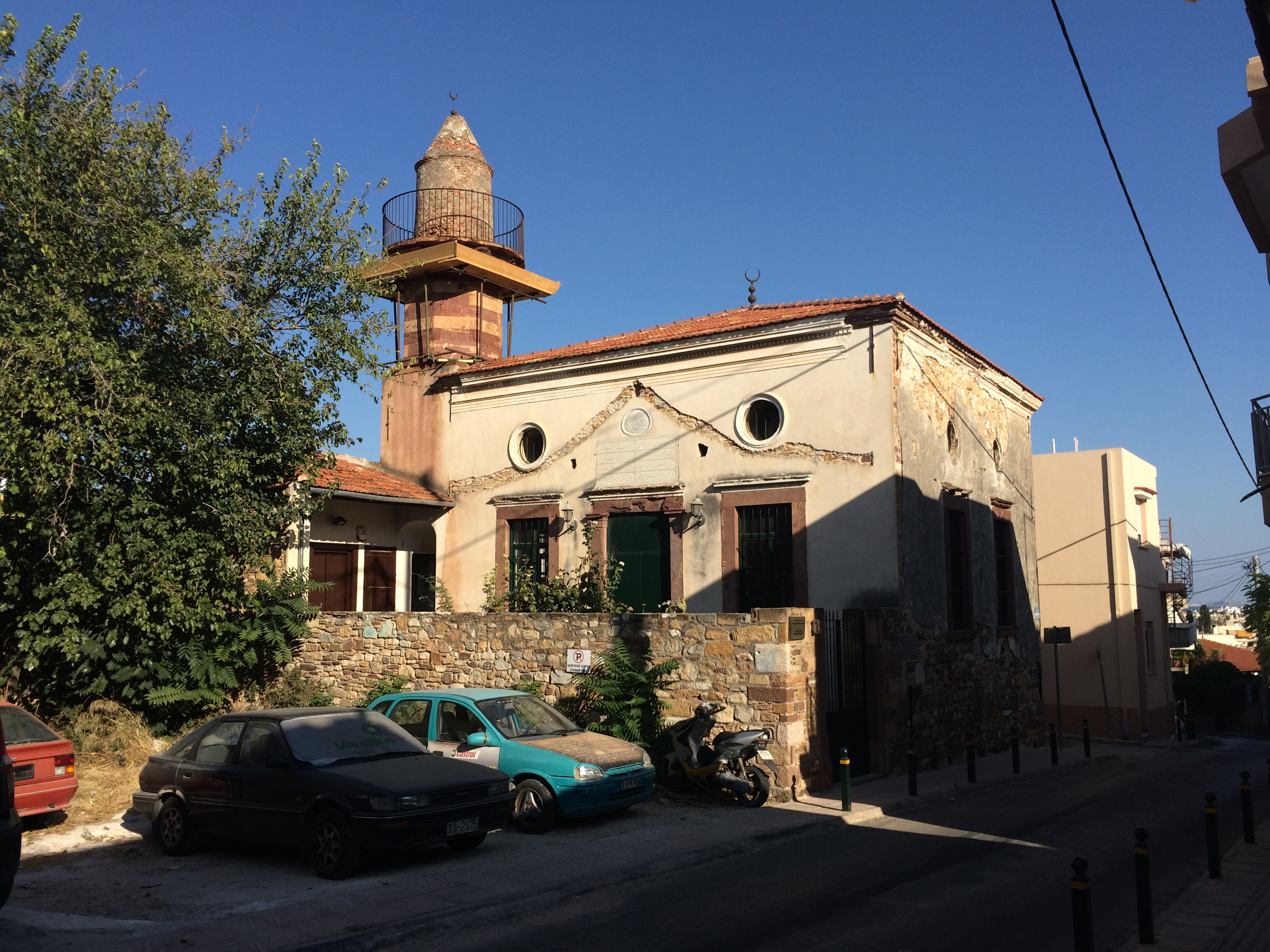

- Location of the former mosque in Greece

Religion
- Affiliation: Islam (former)
- Ecclesiastical or organizational status: Mosque (c. 1892–1912)
- Status: Abandoned (as a mosque); Repurposed (for cultural use)

Location
- Location: Chios, North Aegean
- Country: Greece
- Interactive map of Osmaniye Mosque
- Coordinates: 38°22′22″N 26°08′10″E

Architecture
- Type: Mosque
- Style: Ottoman
- Founder: Sultan Abdülhamit II
- Groundbreaking: 1891
- Completed: 1892

Specifications
- Length: 25 m (82 ft)
- Width: 15 m (49 ft)
- Minaret: 1
- Materials: Brick; stone; marble

The Osmaniye Mosque (Greek: Τζαμί Οσμανιέ, Turkish: Osmaniye Camii), also locally known as the Frangomachala Mosque (Greek: Τζαμί του Φραγκομαχαλά, lit. 'Mosque of the Frankish Quarter') is a former mosque located on eponymous island, in the North Aegean region of Greece. The mosque was built in 1892 during the Ottoman era, was abandoned in 1912, and the building was subsequently repurposed for cultural use.

== History ==
The mosque's construction started in 1891 on the orders of Sultan Abdülhamit II, when Chios city was serving as the capital of the Vilayet of the Archipelago. The construction was completed in 1892. The marble inscription (kitâbe) over the door of the mosque mentions this information. It was prepared by the Turkish artist Feyzî.

The mosque was officially registered by Greek Ministry of Culture as a cultural landmark on January 21, 1983. In 1997, the mosque was repaired and renovated by the Greek government and made available for hosting exhibitions and various cultural events.

== Architecture ==
The mosque has a rectangular plan with an 8 by 10 metres (26 by 33 ft) floor plan and a 8 by 8 metres (26 by 26 ft) main prayer hall. It has a roof-floor, an inlet port and also a gallery on the west side which serves to access the minaret. The minaret is octagonal and is located on the northeastern corner of the mosque. In addition, there is a historical Turkish building connected to the minaret and is an outbuilding to the mosque which contained service rooms during Turkish rule.

The Osmanie Mosque was built in the same period as another Turkish mosque which still survives, the Hamidiye Mosque, in Chios and shows similarities in architectural style.

== See also ==
- Islam in Greece
- List of former mosques in Greece
- Ottoman Greece
