= Chios (town) =

Capital of the island of Chios, Greece

Chios Χίος
- Municipal unit
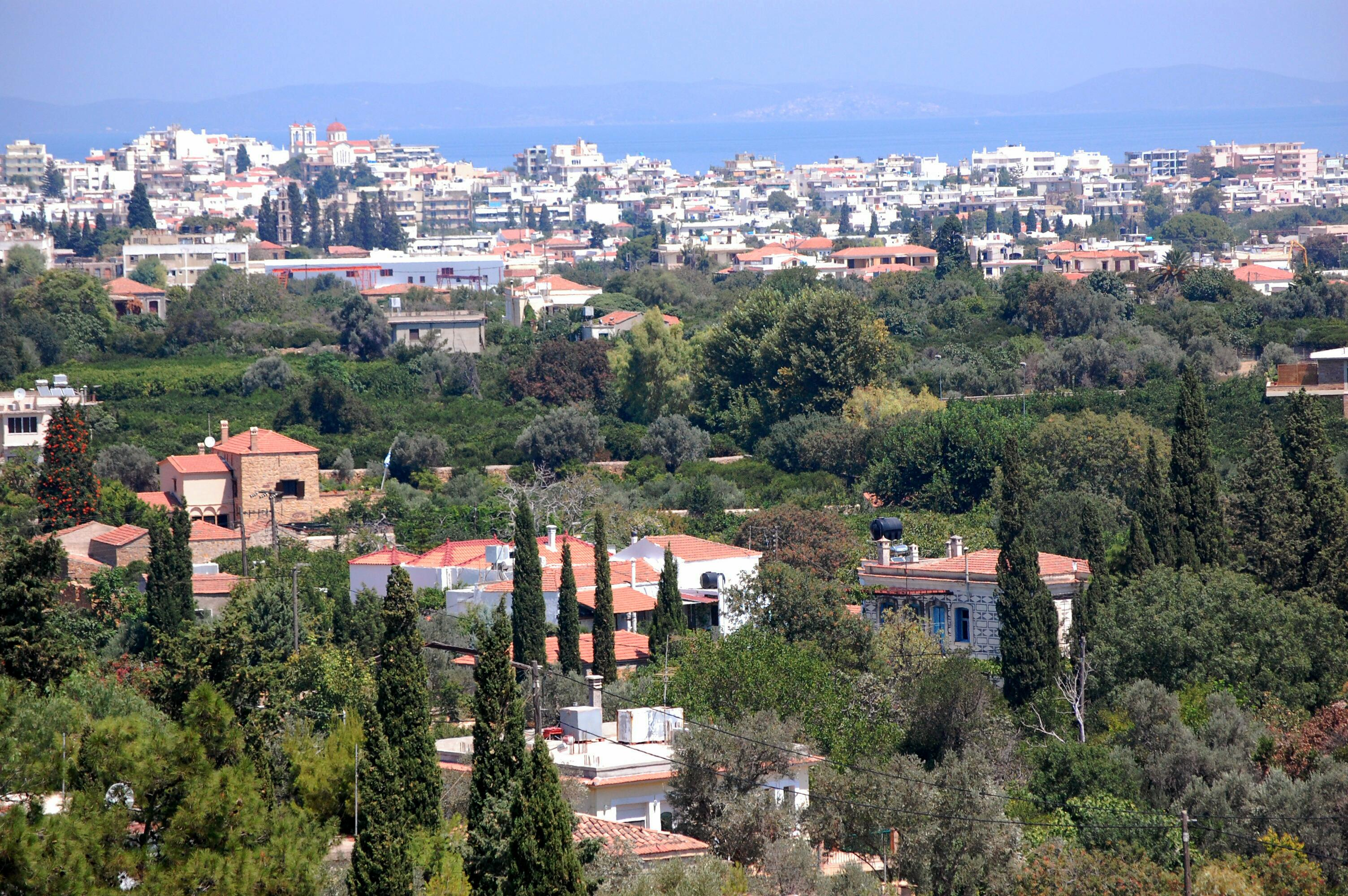
- Chios town

- Seal

- Location within the regional unit

- Location within Greece
- Coordinates: 38°22′21″N 26°08′15″E
- Country: Greece
- Administrative region: North Aegean
- Regional unit: Chios
- Municipality: Chios

Area
  - Municipal unit: 22.823 km^{2} (8.812 sq mi)
- Elevation: 20 m (66 ft)

Population (2021)
  - Municipal unit: 27,015
  - Municipal unit density: 1,183.7/km^{2} (3,065.7/sq mi)
- Demonym(s): Chiot (Greek: Χιώτης, -ισσα "Chiotis")
- Time zone: UTC+2 (EET)
  - Summer (DST): UTC+3 (EEST)
- Postal code: 821 00
- Area code: 22710
- Vehicle registration: ΧΙ
- Website: http://www.chioscity.gr

Chios (Greek: Χίος) is the main town and a former municipality on the Greek island of Chios in the North Aegean. Since the 2011 local government reform, it is part of the municipality Chios, of which it is a municipal unit. The municipal unit has an area of 22.823 km^{2}. It is located on the eastern coast of the island facing the Turkish coastal town of Çeşme. The town has a population of 27,015 (2021) and is the administrative capital and main port of both the island and of the regional unit of Chios. Chios town is one of eight municipal units on the island.

The city is often locally referred to as Chora (Χώρα; lit. 'town') or Kastro (Κάστρο; 'castle') to distinguish it from the entirety of the island with which it shares the name.

North of Chios lies the suburb of Vrontados, while the Chios Island National Airport and town of Karfas lie a few kilometres south of the centre.

== History ==
Originally the site of an ancient settlement, the town was first built at the north side of a natural harbour. By the 16th century, the Byzantine walled town had been further fortified by the Genoese rulers into a massive medieval castle, the "Kastro".

The current town has expanded out from the Kastro, and the port in the last 200 years. After the devastating earthquake of 1881, the town was substantially rebuilt in neoclassical style, although much of the quayside and outskirts are more modern. The promenade and buildings on it, architechnically were influenced by the nearby Smyrna on Asia minor coast. In 1885 the population was circa 13.000.

Although the population is relatively stable, the town continues to expand with suburbs being built to the north and south. Nevertheless, the centre of the town is still concentrated between the port and castle where the administration, several museums, the main shopping street "Aplotaria", and the municipal gardens lie.

== Districts ==
- Aplotariá (Aplotaria Street)
- Agia Marina
- Bella Vista (promenade)
- Bournias
- Kastro
- Neapoli (Tabakika)
- Fragoparikia
- Vounaki (Vounakiou Square)
- Varvasi

== Landmarks ==
- Archaeological Museum of Chios
- Bayrakli Mosque, Chios
- Byzantine Museum of Chios (former Mecidiye Mosque)
- Castle of Chios
- Korais Library
- Palace of Giustiniani
- Maritime Museum of Chios
- Metropolitan Church of Chios (Agion Viktoron)
- Osmaniye Mosque
- Cathedral of St. Nicholas, Chios

== Gallery ==
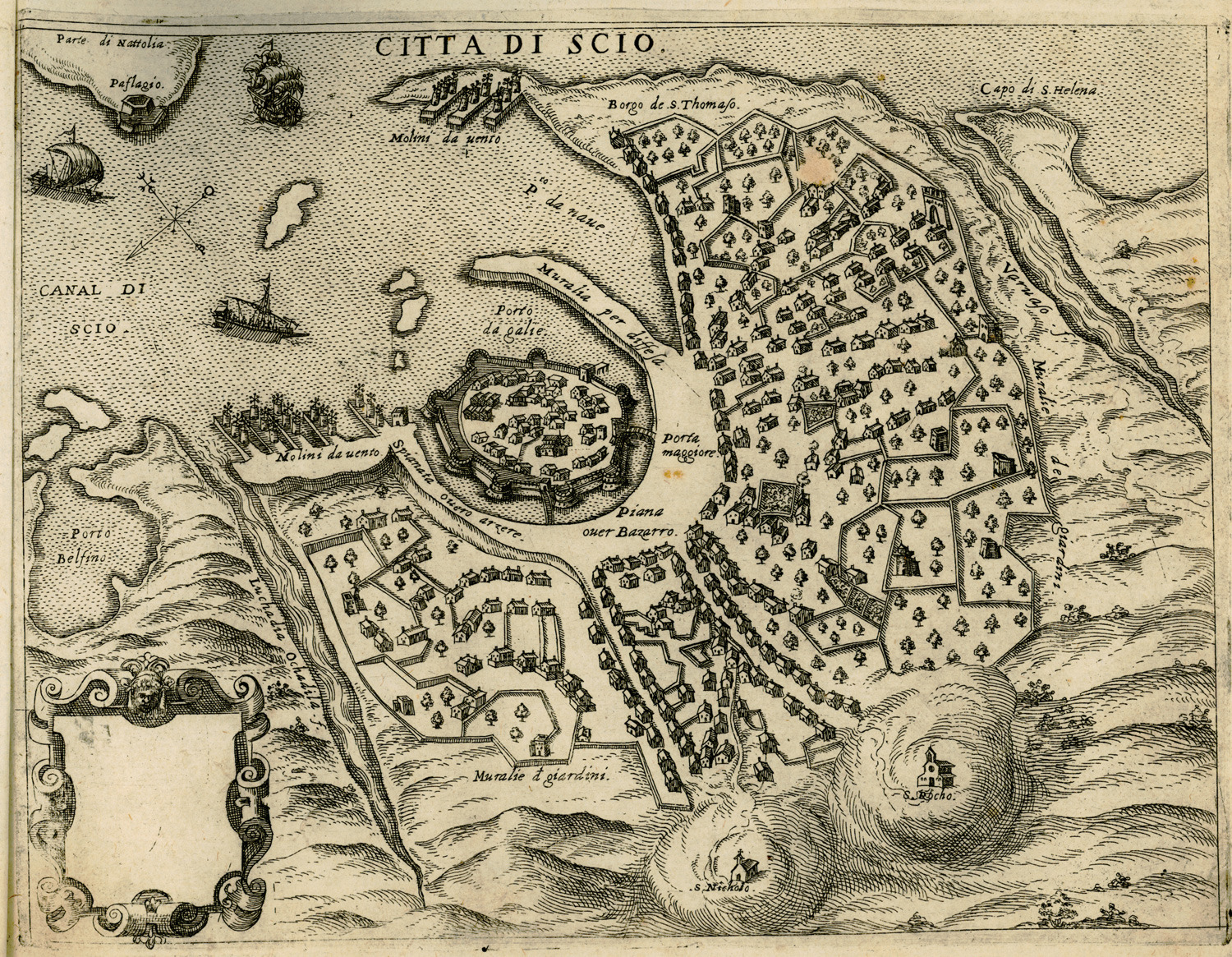
Map of Chios town, 1574

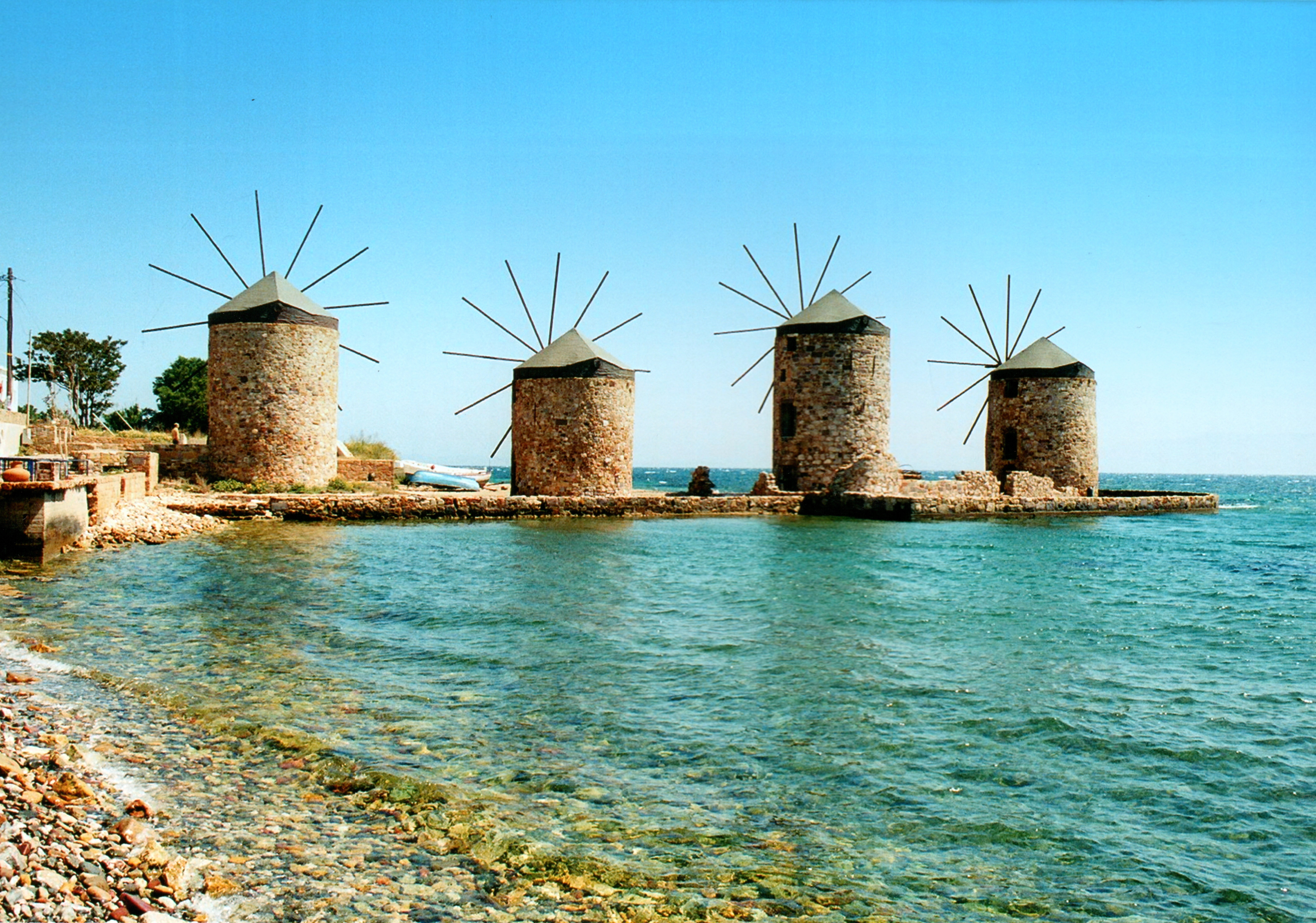
Windmills at the port

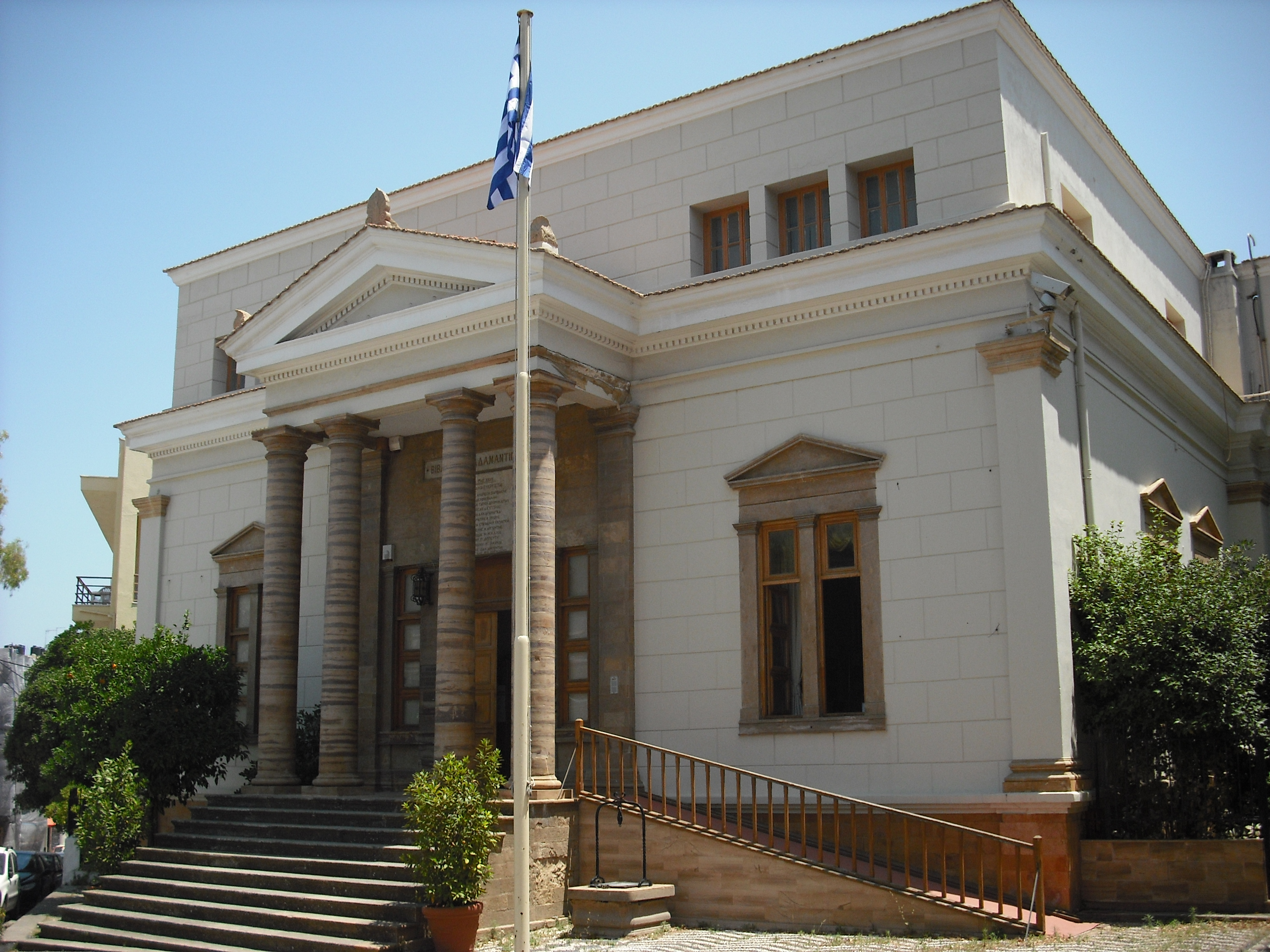
Adamantios Korais public library

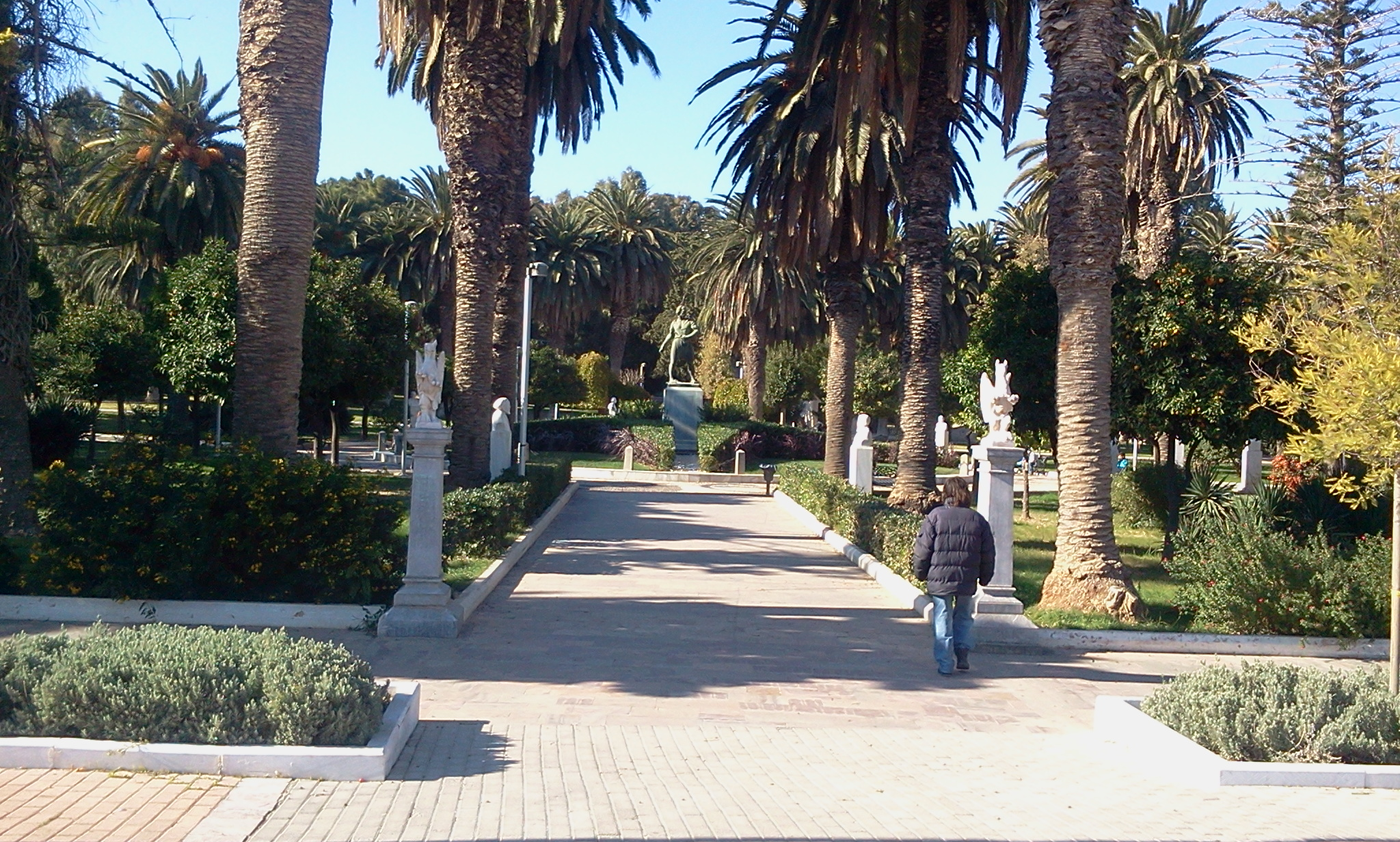
Municipal park, with a statue of Konstantinos Kanaris

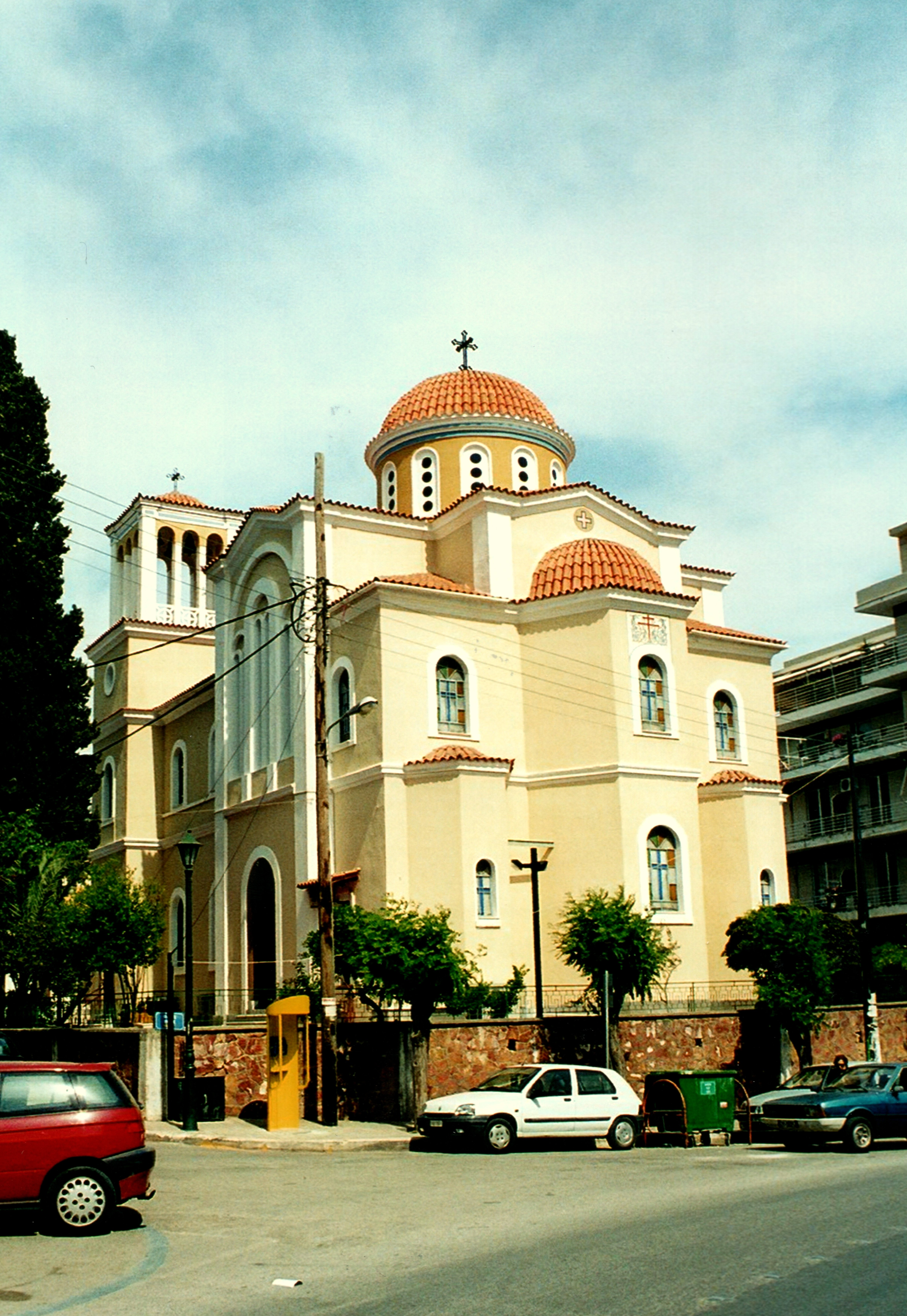
Metropolitan Cathedral of the town

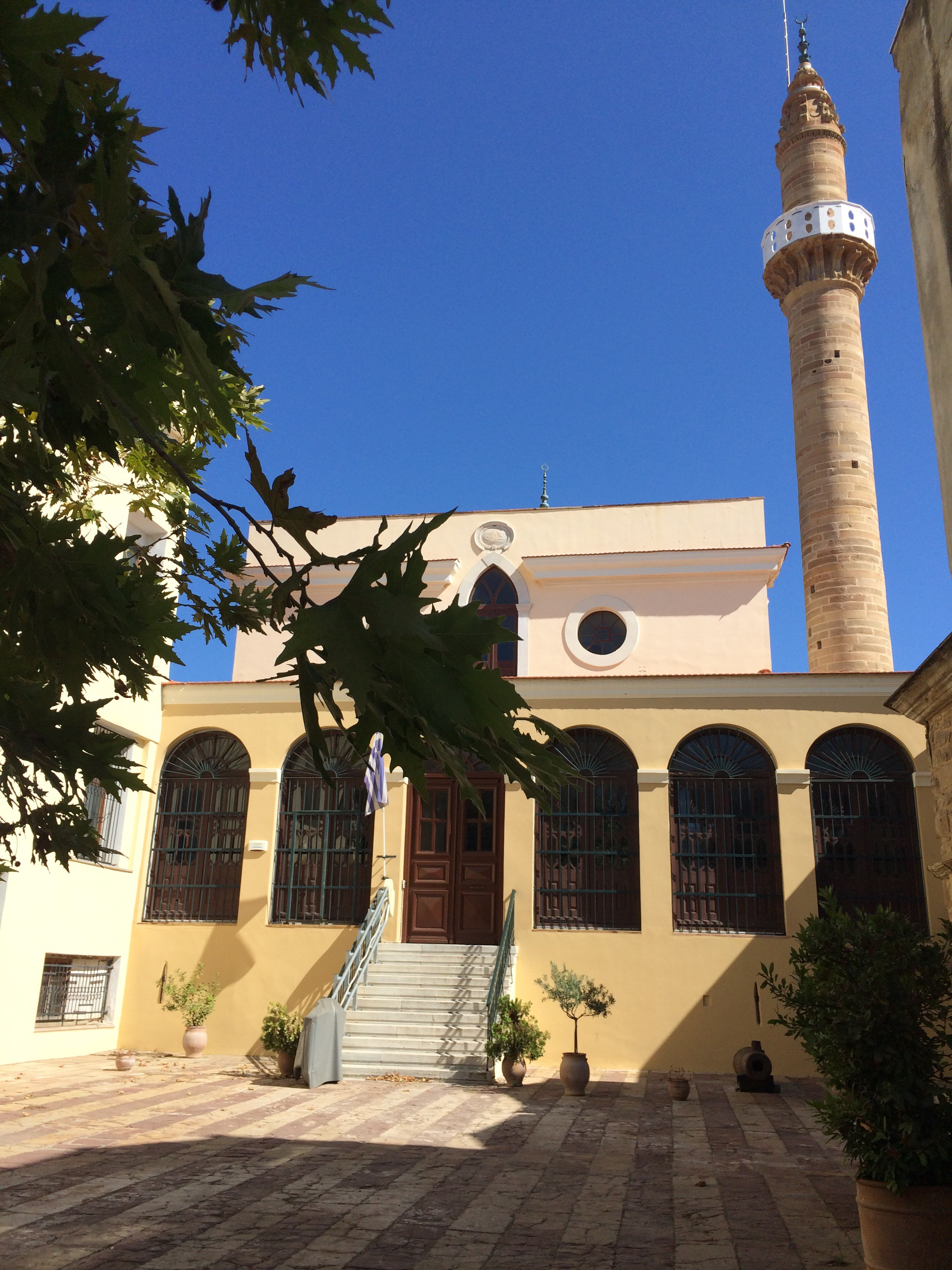
Mecidiye mosque

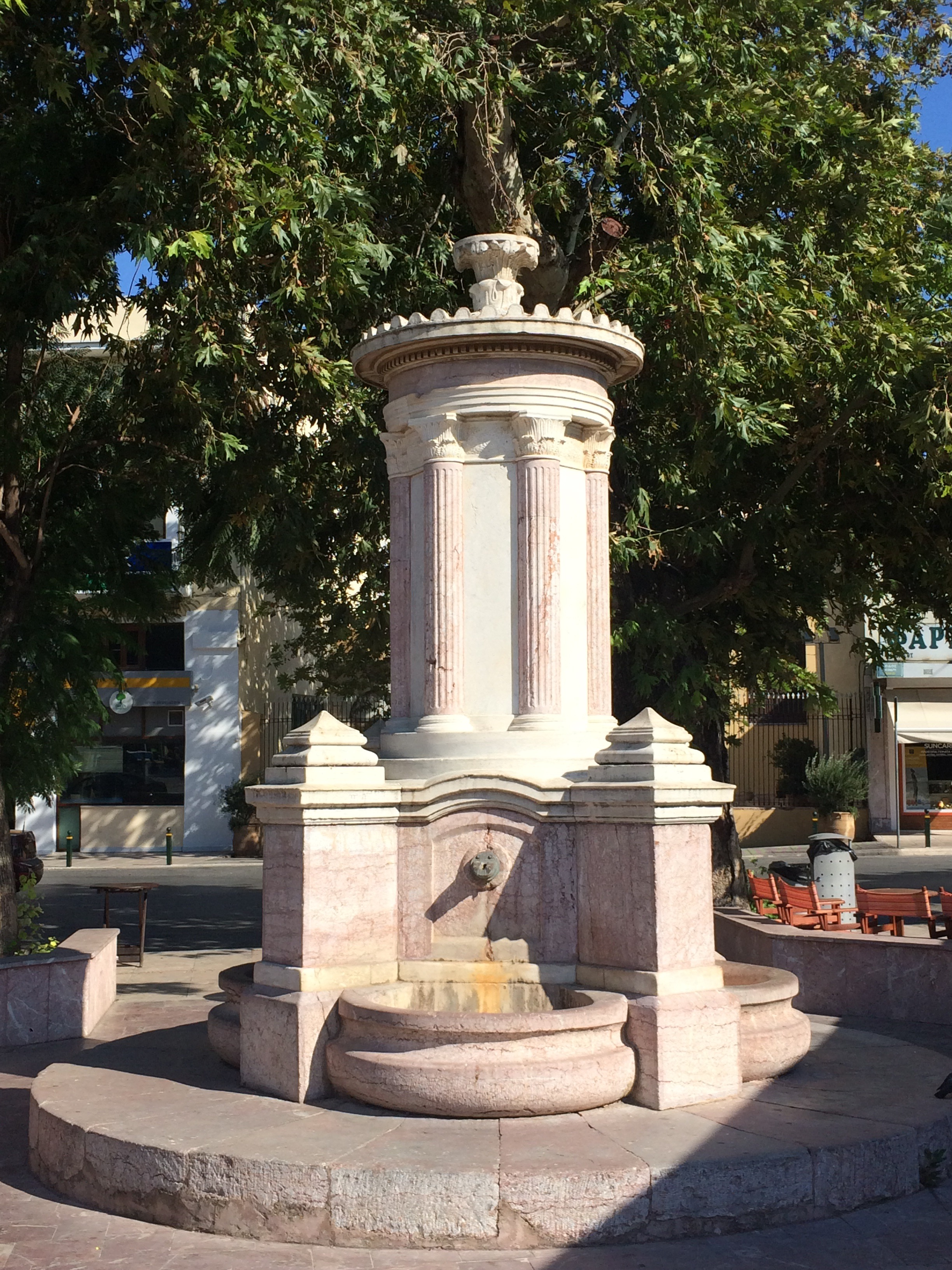
Abdul Hamid Ottoman fountain

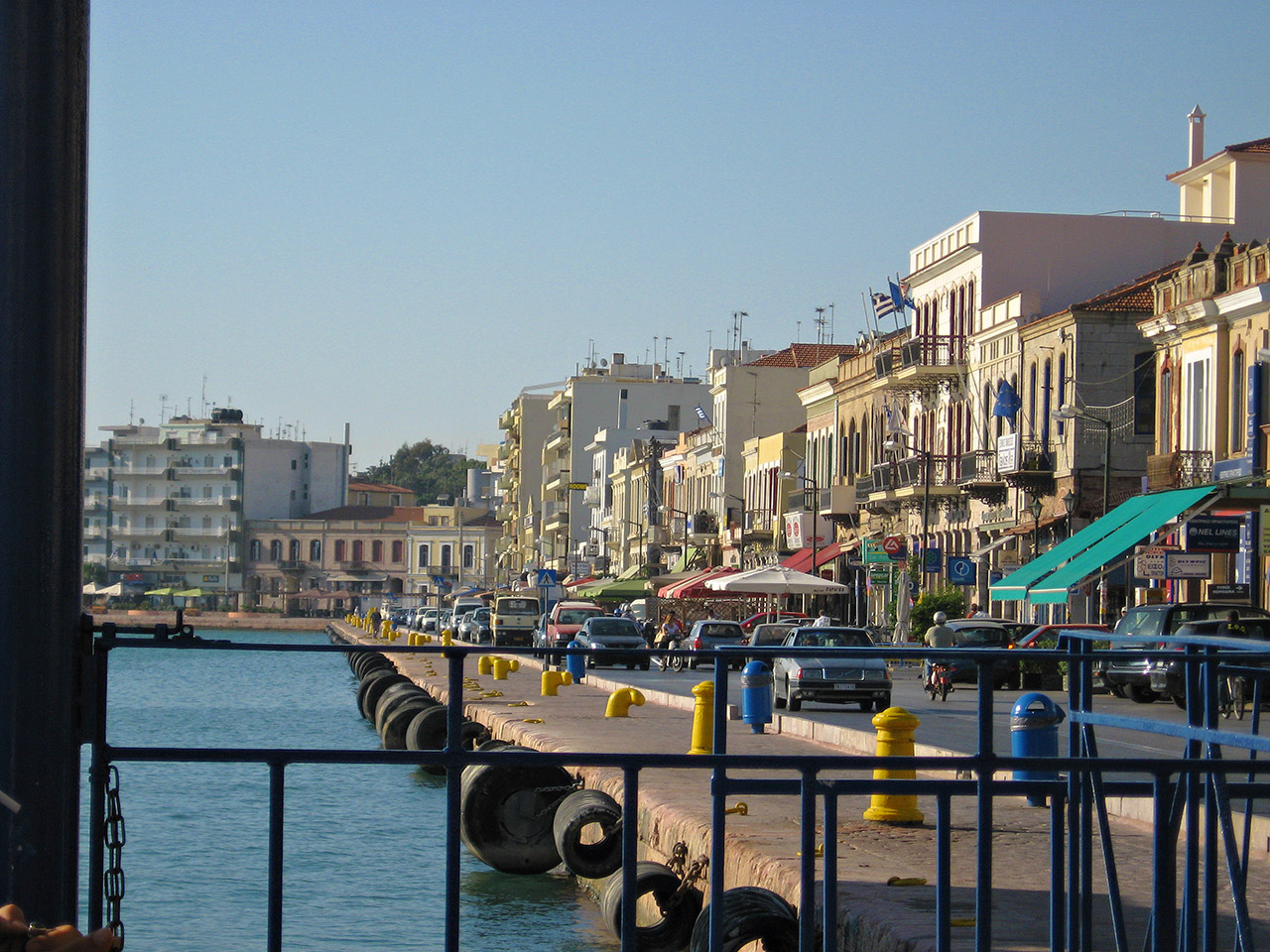
View of the promenade
