= Antonio Zeno =

Antonio Zeno may refer to:

- Antonio Zeno (bishop) (died 1503), Italian Roman Catholic bishop
- Antonio Zeno (died 1403), Italian nobleman from Venice and one of the Zeno brothers
