= Loukas Notaras =

Byzantine writer and official

Megas doux
- In office c. 1441–1453
- Monarch: Constantine XI Palaiologos

Mesazon
- In office 1435–c. 1453
- Monarch: Constantine XI Palaiologos John VIII Palaiologos

Personal details
- Born: 5 April 1402
- Died: 1453 (aged 50–51) Constantinople
- Children: Anna Notaras; Jacob Notaras; Helena; Theodora

Military service
- Allegiance: Byzantine Empire
- Years of service: c. 1424–1453
- Battles/wars: Fall of Constantinople

Loukas Notaras (Greek: Λουκᾶς Νοταρᾶς; 5 April 1402 – 3 June 1453) was a Byzantine Greek statesman who served as the last megas doux or grand duke (commander-in-chief of the Byzantine navy) and the last mesazon (chief minister) of the Byzantine Empire, under emperors John VIII Palaiologos and Constantine XI Palaiologos.

== Biography ==
Loukas Notaras was descended from a Greek family originally from Monemvasia; his earliest ancestor whom we can identify in the surviving sources was one sebastos Paul, who captured the island of Kythera from the Venetians for the Emperor Michael VIII Palaiologos in 1270. Other members of the Notarades can be identified over the following decades. In the middle of the 14th century one branch relocated to Constantinople, where they rose to political and social prominence by supporting Andronikos IV Palaiologos, who was rebelling against his father John V Palaiologos, and then, after Andronikos's death, by supporting his son John VII Palaiologos.

Loukas Notaras' father was Nicholas Notaras, a wealthy merchant in Galata, who served as envoy to emperor Manuel II Palaiologos in Italy, France, and England; he held the citizenships of Genoa and Venice. His mother's name was Euprepeia. Little is known of her, other than that she died before 1412, and was buried in the Xanthopoulon Monastery in Constantinople. Loukas had at least one brother, John, who served as epi tes trapezes, was captured in a skirmish during the 1411 siege of Constantinople and decapitated. Nicholas ransomed his son's head and buried it with the rest of his remains in a public funeral.

In 1424, Notaras was one of three emissaries—along with Manuel Melachrenos and George Sphrantzes—who negotiated a treaty of friendship between Emperor John VII Palaiologos and Sultan Murad II of the Ottoman Turks at the end of the Ottoman Interregnum. His continued importance as an imperial official is attested by his presence at the marriage of the future Emperor Constantine XI Palaiologos to Caterina Gattilusio 27 July 1441.

The famous phrase "I would rather see a Turkish turban in the midst of the City (i.e., Constantinople) than the Latin mitre" (Greek: κρειττότερον ἐστὶν εἰδέναι ἐν μέσῃ τῇ Πόλει φακιόλιον βασιλεῦον Τούρκου, ἢ καλύπτραν λατινικήν) is attributed to him by Doukas, but although it does reflect the views of the party hostile to the Union of the Churches established by the Council of Florence, the attribution to Notaras is probably wrong. Indeed, Notaras worked with his emperor Constantine XI to secure Catholic aid by whatever avenues they could find while simultaneously attempting to avoid riots by the Orthodox faithful. Unfortunately for his memory, this pragmatic middle course led to his vilification by both sides of the debate, attacks which were not lessened by the intense politicking going on among the late Imperial hierarchy. Constantine's close friend and personal secretary George Sphrantzes, for instance, seldom has a charitable word for Notaras and Sphrantzes' antipathy was repeated in turn by Edward Gibbon.

=== Fall of Constantinople ===
During the 1453 siege of Constantinople, Notaras led the troops along the north-western Sea Wall. Some accounts of the siege have him deserting his post after the Ottoman banner was raised on the tower above the Kerkoporta, but this may have been politically motivated slander. In any case, he was able to hold the Sea Wall—which had been the point of entry of all earlier successful attacks on the city—against the Turks until the breach of the land walls rendered his efforts moot.

=== Death ===
Notaras, his Palaiologos wife and his eldest son were all captured by the Turks and originally granted clemency in the name of reestablishing order and in exchange for much of Notaras's fortune, which he had the sense to invest abroad in Venice in the form of dowries for his children. Nonetheless, he was executed shortly after along with his son and son-in-law. This may have simply been due to the Sultan rethinking the wisdom of allowing a noble with ties to the Vatican and Venice to live; Gibbon believes he was caught already in the middle of such intrigue. Another explanation is that Mehmet sexually desired Notaras's 14 year old third son Jacob, and when Notaras refused to hand him over, the furious Sultan ordered their deaths.

According to Makarios Melissenos, known as "Pseudo Sphrantzes", who wrote an unreliable (probably apocryphal) eyewitness account of the Fall of Constantinople, Mehmed's final words to Notaras before he ordered his execution:

Inhuman half-breed dog, skilled in flattery and deceit! You possessed all this wealth and denied it to your lord the emperor and to the City, your homeland? And now, with all your intrigues and immense treachery, which you have been weaving since youth, you are trying to deceive me and avoid that fate you deserve. Tell me, impious man, who has granted possession of this City and your treasure to me? [Notaras answered that God was responsible.] Since God saw it fit to enslave you and all the others to me, what are you trying to accomplish here with your chattering, criminal? Why did you not offer this treasure to me before this war started or before my victory? You could have been my ally and I would have honoured you in return. As things stand, God, not you, has granted me your treasure.

== Family ==
The widow of Notaras, who was on her sickbed during the final Ottoman assault, died a slave along the way to Adrianople, the former Ottoman capital; she was buried near the village of Mesene. Two members of Notaras' family were on the passenger list of a Genoese ship that escaped the fall of the city. His daughter Anna became the focal point of the Byzantine expatriate community in Venice. Two other daughters, Helena Notaras and Theodora Notaras, also survived the fall and joined their sister in exile. Helena Notaras (who later took the monastic name of Euphrosyne) had married the heir to Ainos, Giorgio Gattilusio in 1444.

== Writings ==
A collection of Lucas Notaras's letters in Latin has been published in Greece under the title Epistulae. It includes Ad Theodorum Carystenum, Scholario, Eidem, Ad eundem and Sancto magistro Gennadio Scholario. He figures as a character in the book Johannes Angelos by the Finnish author Mika Waltari (1952, Eng. translation The Dark Angel, 1953). In the novel he is depicted as leader of a group of Byzantine nobles who vainly try to collaborate with the enemy after the fall of Constantinople.

== In popular culture ==
- In the 1951 Turkish film İstanbul'un Fethi, Notaras was played by Vedat Örfi Bengü.
- In the 1952 historical novel Johannes Angelos by Mika Waltari
- In the 1973 novel The Camp of the Saints (French: Le Camp des Saints) by Jean Raspail, as the ancestor or namesake of the fictional "Captain Luke Notaras" who does not rescue, but steers his ship through, shipwrecked Indian migrants in the Arabian Sea
- In the 2012 Turkish film Fetih 1453, Notaras was played by Naci Adıgüzel.
- In the 2019 historical novel Porphyry and Ash
- In the 2020 historical fiction docuseries Rise of Empires: Ottoman, Notaras was played by Osman Sonant.
- In the 2024 Turkish historical fiction series Mehmed: Fetihler Sultanı, Notaras was played by Fikret Kuşkan, Osman Soykut, and Ozman Sirgood.

== Sources ==
- Babinger, Franz (1978). Mehmed the Conqueror and His Time. Bollingen Series 96. Translated from the German by Ralph Manheim. Edited, with a preface, by William C. Hickman (1978 ed.). Princeton, New Jersey: Princeton University Press.
- "Le rachat des Notaras apres la chute de Constantinople ou les relations 'étrangères' de l'élite Byzantine au XVe siecle", by Thierry Ganchou, in Migrations et diasporas méditerranéennes (Xe-XVIe siecles), Paris 2002.
- Magoulias, Harry, ed. (1975). Decline and Fall of Byzantium to the Ottoman Turks, by Doukas. An Annotated Translation of "Historia Turco-Byzantina" by Harry J. Magoulias, Wayne State University. Detroit: Wayne State University Press. ISBN 978-0-8143-1540-8.
- Nicol, Donald M. (1993) [1972]. The Last Centuries of Byzantium, 1261–1453 (Second ed.). Cambridge: Cambridge University Press. ISBN 978-0-521-43991-6.
- Norwich, John Julius (1995). Byzantium: The Decline and Fall. Vol. 3. Viking Press. ISBN 978-0-679-41650-0.
- Philippides, Marios; Hanak, Walter K. (2011). The Siege and the Fall of Constantinople in 1453: Historiography, Topography and Military Studies. Ashgate Publishing, Ltd. ISBN 978-1-4094-1064-5.
- Philippides, Marios (2018). Constantine XI Dragaš Palaeologus (1404–1453): The Last Emperor of Byzantium. Routledge. ISBN 978-1-351055406.
- Setton, Kenneth M. (1978). The Papacy and the Levant (1204–1571), Volume II: The Fifteenth Century. Vol. 2. Philadelphia: The American Philosophical Society. ISBN 0-87169-127-2.
- Trapp, Erich; Beyer, Hans-Veit; Walther, Rainer; Sturm-Schnabl, Katja; Kislinger, Ewald; Leontiadis, Ioannis; Kaplaneres, Sokrates (1976–1996). Prosopographisches Lexikon der Palaiologenzeit (in German). Vienna: Verlag der Österreichischen Akademie der Wissenschaften. ISBN 3-7001-3003-1.
