= Jacob Notaras =

Byzantine aristocrat

Jacob Notaras (Greek: Ιάκωβος Νοταράς; c. 1439 – c. 1491), also known as Jacopo and erroneously called Isaac, was a Byzantine aristocrat who survived the fall of Constantinople in 1453. Having got attention of the Ottoman ruler Mehmed the Conqueror as an adolescent, he was confined to the seraglio until he escaped in 1460. He later became one of the leaders of the Byzantine diaspora in Italy.

== Captivity ==
Jacob Notaras was the youngest son of Loukas Notaras, an "enormously wealthy" aristocrat from Constantinople who served as the Megas Doux and grand admiral to the last Byzantine emperors.

When Constanintople fell to the Ottoman ruler Mehmed II, Jacob was 14 years old. Many boys and girls were taken as slaves during the fall of Constantinople, including by the Sultan himself. The Ottoman official Tursun Beg wrote: "After having completely overcome the enemy, the soldiers began to plunder the city. They enslaved boys and girls and took silver and gold vessels, precious stones and all sorts of valuable goods and fabrics from the imperial palace and the houses of the rich... Every tent was filled with handsome boys and beautiful girls." According to Nicolas de Nicolay, slaves were displayed naked at the city's slave market, and young girls could be purchased.

Jacob was said to have caught the attention of the Sultan when the conqueror visited the house of Notaras. Three days afterwards, Loukas Notaras was executed along with his son and son-in-law, while Jacob was taken by the Sultan. Critobulus confirms that Mehmed II took slaves during the fall of Constantinople and noted that: "As for the Sultan, he was sensual rather than acquisitive, and more interested in people than in goods. Phrantzes, the faithful servant of the Basileus, has recounted the fate of his young and good-looking family. His three daughters were consigned to the Imperial harem, even the youngest, a girl of fourteen, who died there of despair. His only son John, a fifteen-year-old boy, was killed by the Sultan for having repelled his advances."

American researcher Walter G. Andrew doubts the authenticity of this story, citing the similarities with the earlier story of Saint Pelagius, while others like English historian Steven Runciman accept the story's validity. It is worth mentioning that such acts were not uncommon for the Sultan, as one of the concubines (sex slaves) in the Ottoman Imperial harem of Mehmed II was Çiçek Hatun, who was herself referred to as a slave-girl captured during the fall of Constantinople.

Jacob Notaras stayed in the seraglio until 1460 and then escaped from Adrianopolis to Italy, where he reunited with his three sisters: Anna, Theodora and Euphrosyne. He later married Elizabeth Zampetis, and apparently was unhappy with his personal life.

== Bibliography ==
- Babinger, Franz (1992). Mehmed the Conqueror and His Time. Princeton University Press. pp. 95–97. ISBN 0-691-01078-1.
- Philippides, Marios; Hanak, Walter K. (2011). The Siege and the Fall of Constantinople in 1453: Historiography, Topography, and Military Studies. Ashgate Publishing, Ltd. pp. 255–256. ISBN 978-1-4094-1064-5.
