= Bayrakli Mosque, Chios =

Former mosque in Chios, Greece

Bayrakli Mosque
- Μπαϊρακλί Τζαμί
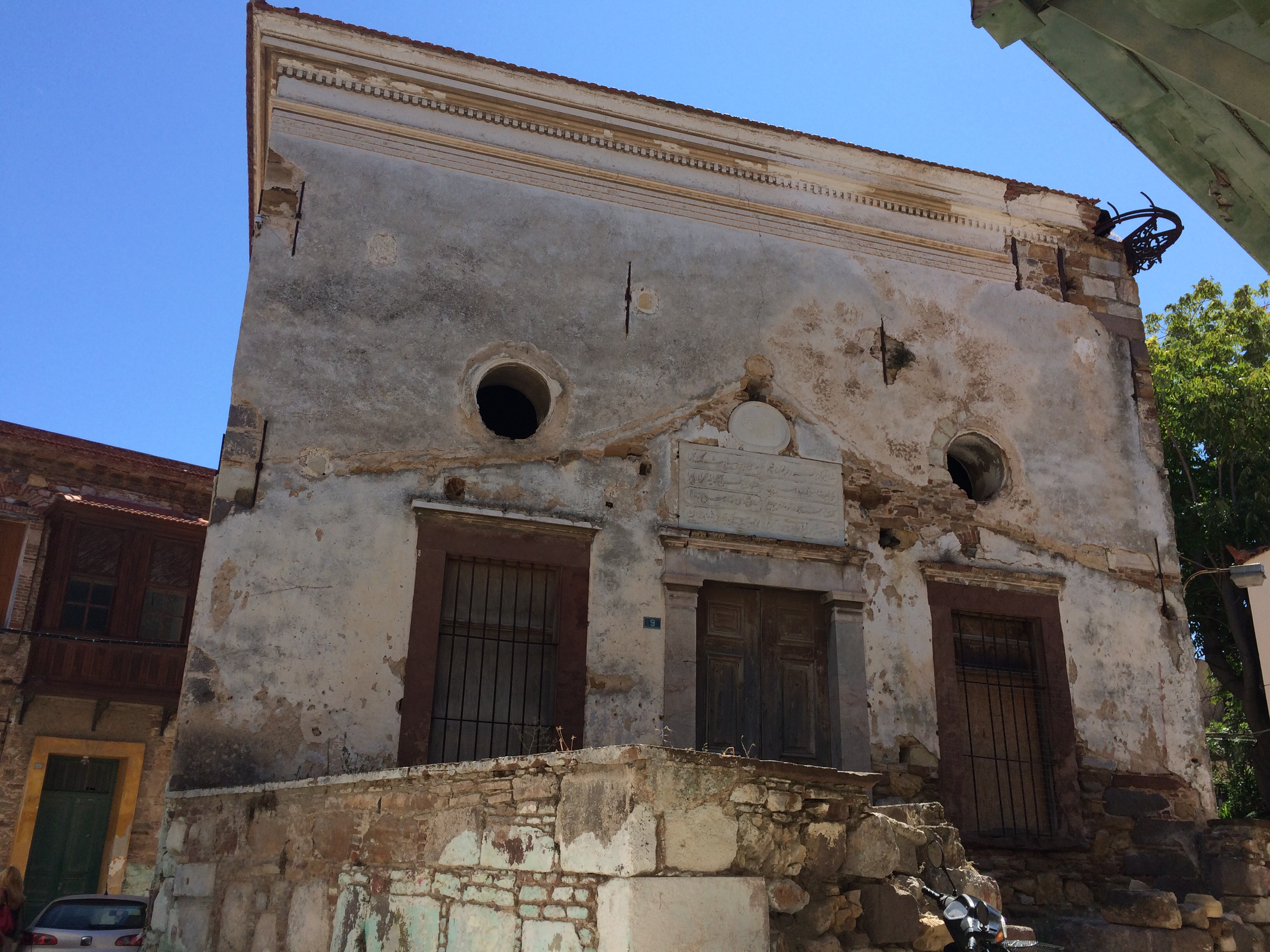
- The former mosque 2017

- Location of the former mosque in Greece

Religion
- Affiliation: Islam (former)
- Ecclesiastical or organizational status: Mosque (1892–1920s)
- Status: Abandoned (as a mosque); Repurposed (for cultural purposes)

Location
- Location: Chios, North Aegean
- Country: Greece
- Interactive map of Bayrakli Mosque
- Coordinates: 38°22′22″N 26°08′10″E

Architecture
- Type: Mosque
- Style: Ottoman
- Founder: Abdul Hamit II
- Completed: 1892
- Materials: Stone; brick

The Bayrakli Mosque (Greek: Μπαϊρακλί Τζαμί, from Turkish: Bayraklı Camii, lit. 'Mosque of the Flag-bearer') also known as the Hamidiye Mosque (Greek: Τζαμί Χαμηδιέ) is a former mosque on the island of Chios, in the North Aegean region of Greece. Built in 1892 during the Ottoman-era, it is one of the three surviving former mosques on the island, the other two being the Osmaniye Mosque and the Mecidiye Mosque, all three no longer used for Islamic worship.

== History ==
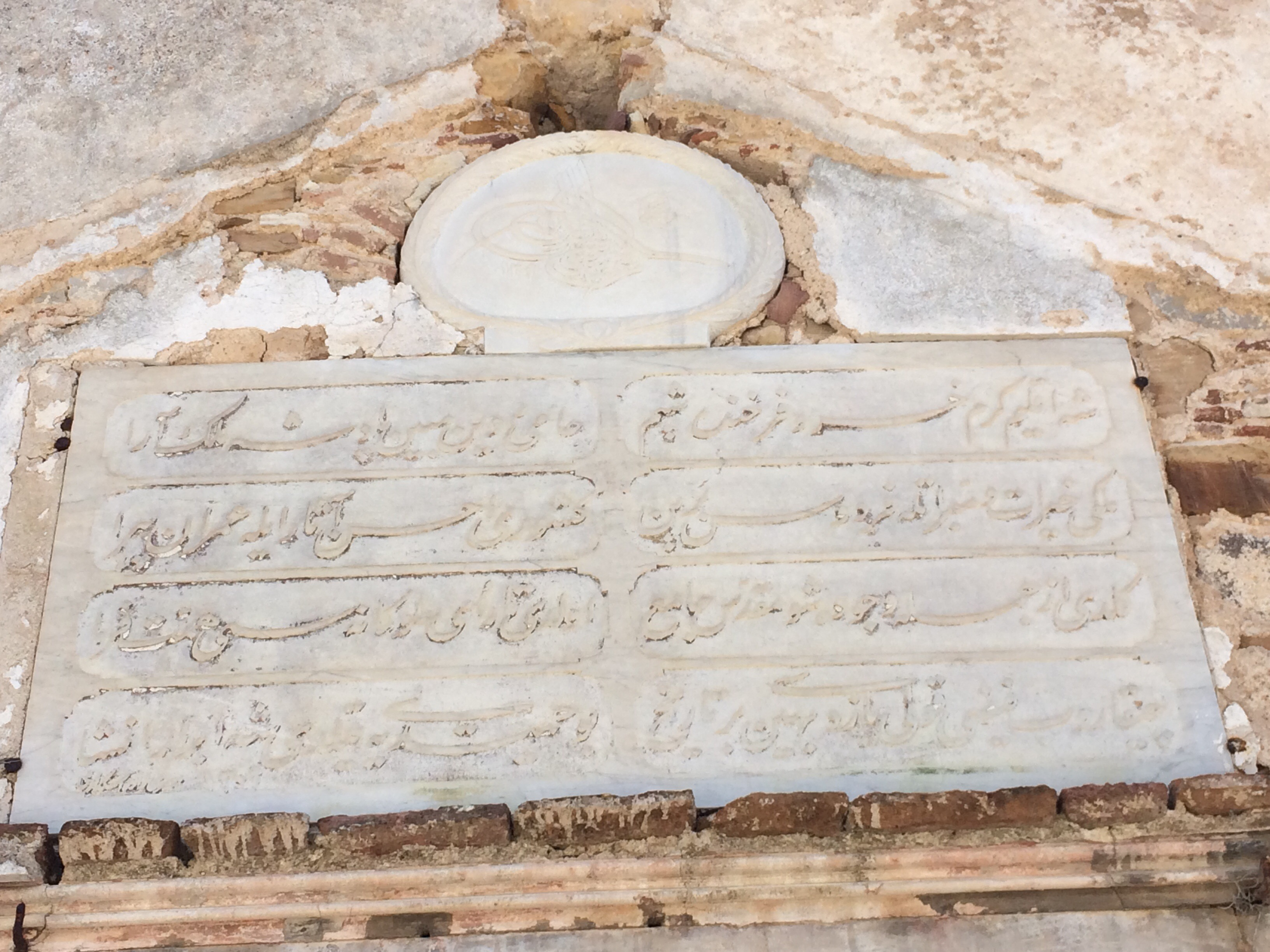
The inscription above the door.

The mosque stands inside the fortress of the old town of Chios, on Saint George Street, on the site of the ancient city. A local tradition holds that an old Genoese Catholic church formerly occupied part of the site. A scholarly identification along similar lines has been proposed: on the basis of a marble fragment found opposite the ruined mosque and the building's depiction as a church on an early plan of the citadel, it has been suggested that the mosque probably occupies the site of the church of San Domenico, later known as Santa Maria di Castello, which was the principal Dominican church within the fortress. According to a copy made by Girolamo Giustiniani of an inscription formerly in that church, the Genoese commander Giovanni Giustiniani Longo was buried there. A patrician of Genoa and a member of the Maona of Chios, he commanded part of the defence of Constantinople and died of a wound received during the siege; the original inscription does not survive and is known only through Giustiniani's transcription.

When the Ottomans captured Chios in 1566, all the churches in the citadel were reportedly converted into mosques except that of the Dominicans. The present mosque was built later, in 1891–1892, by order of Sultan Abdülhamit II, when Chios was part of the Ottoman Empire and the Vilayet of the Archipelago, as recorded by the marble inscription above the doorframe. Several materials taken from ancient buildings were used in its construction.

Following the Armenian Genocide, the Treaty of Lausanne and the exchange of populations between Turkey and Greece in the early twentieth century, the building no longer functioned as a mosque but housed a displaced Armenian family, whose initials that they carved in the stone can still be seen. It was eventually sold to a bank, which donated it to the Greek Ministry of Culture. The Greek Ministry of Culture registered the building on March 5, 1999, and for some time, it functioned as a repair shop for electronic devices. Renovations works on the mosque began in 2018 and finished in 2023, when the mosque was made available to the public once more as a monument.

There have been calls for the former mosque to be given back to the Muslim community as a prayer center, although as of November 2023, it has not been implemented.

== Architecture ==
The mosque has a rectangular floor plan and covered with a roof, while the main prayer area was torn down. Above the mihrab, the panel reads "Küllema dehale aleyha Zekeriyya el-mihrab" ("each time Zacharias goes in the altar where Mary takes place"), referring to Virgin Mary and the visits of High Priest Zacharias to Solomon's Temple.

During the renovation works that were completed by 2023, large parts of the interior decoration were reconstructed, while the exterior was systematically preserved.

The Bayrakli Mosque was built during the same time as another Ottoman mosque in Chios, the Osmaniye Mosque, and thus shares some similarities in architectural style.

== See also ==
- Islam in Greece
- List of former mosques in Greece
- Ottoman Greece

== Bibliography ==
- Konuk, Neval (2008). Ottoman architecture in Lesvos, Rhodes, Chios and Kos islands. Ankara: The Center for Strategic Research. ISBN 978-9757307693.
- Hasluck, F. W. (1909–1910). "The Latin Monuments of Chios". The Annual of the British School at Athens. 16: 137–184.
