= The Dark Angel (Waltari novel) =

1952 novel by Mika Waltari

- First edition (Finnish)
- Author: Mika Waltari
- Original title: Johannes Angelos
- Cover artist: Björn Landström
- Genre: Historical novel
- Publisher: WSOY
- Publication date: 1952
- Publication place: Finland

The Dark Angel (original title Johannes Angelos) is a novel by Finnish author Mika Waltari about a hopeless love affair and the Fall of Constantinople. The Finnish version was originally published in 1952, with an English edition being published in Great Britain in 1953.

== Plot ==
The narrator is Jean Ange, alias John Angelos, born in Avignon. Prior to the events of the novel, he had been a friend of Sultan Murad II and then also of his son, Mehmed II; but once Mehmed had begun his march to Constantinople, Ange fled there.

The novel begins as Jean Ange meets Anna Notaras in Constantinople and they fall instantly in love. At first Ange is unaware of her identity, but later he realises she is the daughter of megas doux Lucas Notaras.

Ange is committed to fight to the death on the side of the Christians against the Islamic Ottoman forces. Nevertheless, his prior relationship with Mehmed earns him constant distrust from both Latin and Greek Christians.

In the final part of the book, Jean Ange is seen to be an unreliable narrator who had concealed from the reader - and from everybody he met including his beloved Anna - the vital information that he was born in Avignon to exiled Royal Byzantine parents and actually had a valid dynastic claim on the Byzantine imperial throne. On his way to Constantinople, he had passed through the Ottoman camp - and Mehmed had let him proceed, hoping that he would press his claim and ignite a civil war inside the besieged city. But in fact, Jean kept his secret and revealed to no one his ancestry.

Constantinople ultimately falls under Mehmed's attack, and Anna dies while in the disguise of a soldier. Only then does Jean press his claim on the throne against Mehmed, who, astonished at Jean's defiance and having looked forward to socialising with him, is left with little choice but to order him put to death.

Anna Notaras is a real historical character. In actuality, she did not die during the Fall of Constantinople but escaped and lived to a ripe old age as a major member of the Greek community in Italy.

== Research and writing ==
The novel, written in a diary format, was inspired by a real diary by Niccolò Barbaro describing the 1453 siege of Constantinople. The character of Angelos especially had his basis on a marginal note in red ink mentioning a Greek traitor for the Turks by the name of Angelo Zacaria. Scholar Panu Rajala visited Biblioteca Nazionale Marciana, which held both a copy and the original, and read from the checkout list that Mika Waltari was the fourth one to be allowed to examine the book, on 7 November 1952.

Waltari abandoned an early draft, closer to his previous novels in structure, which was published posthumously in 1981 as Nuori Johannes.

== Reception ==
Time praised Waltari as an "anything but clumsy" novelist with his portraiture of the battle environment, and likened the fractures forming in Constantinople's walls to the growing division between Christians, leading to irreparable ruination. Daily News foresaw it for many readers as "the most powerful and skillful of the historical novels of Mika Waltari". The New York Times, while regarding The Dark Angel as falling short of Waltari's previous historical fiction and reliant on its subject matter for gaining readership, nevertheless commended the handling of all minor characters and "Mr. Waltari's understanding of the interplay of motives that permit Mohammed II, complete with satellites, to overthrow the ancient capital".
