= The Conquest of Constantinople =

- Directed by: Aydin Arakon
- Starring: Sami Ayanoğlu
- Release date: 1951
- Running time: 95 minutes
- Country: Turkey
- Language: Turkish

The Conquest of Constantinople (Turkish: İstanbul'un Fethi) is a 1951 Turkish adventure film directed by Aydın G. Arakon. It was the first film of the "Ottomans v. Byzantines" genre which became very popular in Turkey. The film depicts the Fall of Constantinople (1453). It was shown in the United States in 1954.

== Cast ==
- Sami Ayanoğlu as Sultan Mehemed Han
- Turan Seyfioğlu as Ulubatlı Hasan
- Filiz Tekin as Fatma
- Reşit Gürzap as Çandarlı Halil Paşa
- Cahit Irgat as İmparator Konstantinos
- Vedat Örfi Bengü as Natoras Lukas
- Nubar Terziyan as Kostanzo
- Neşet Berküren as Zagnos Paşa
- Müfit Kiper as Sarıca Paşa
- Ercüment Behzat Lav as Bizans Elçisi
- Eşref Vural as Mustafa
- Turan Seyfioğlu as Ulubatlı Hasan
- Cem Salur as Hızır Bey
- Kemal Ergüvenç as Komundan Jüsinyoni
- Atıf Avcı as Yuvanis
- Sait Yaşmaklı as Molla Gürâni
- Vedat Karaokçu as Şair Ahmet Paşa
- Kemal Tözem as Oduni Mahmut Paşa
- Türkan Can as Antonina

== See also ==
- List of Islamic films
