= Patriarch Gregory =

Patriarch Gregory or Catholicos Gregory may refer to:

Constantinople

- Gregory of Nazianzus, Patriarch in 379–381
- Gregory II of Constantinople, Patriarch in 1283–1289
- Gregory III of Constantinople, Patriarch in 1443–1450
- Gregory IV of Constantinople, Patriarch in 1623
- Gregory V of Constantinople, Patriarch in 1797–1798, 1806–1808 and 1818–1821
- Gregory VI of Constantinople, Patriarch in 1835–1840
- Gregory VII of Constantinople, Patriarch in 1923–1924

Alexandria

- Patriarch Gregory of Cappadocia, Patriarch in 339-345
- Patriarch Gregory I of Alexandria, Patriarch in 1243–1263
- Patriarch Gregory II of Alexandria, Patriarch in 1316–1354
- Patriarch Gregory III of Alexandria, Patriarch in 1354–1366
- Patriarch Gregory IV of Alexandria, Patriarch in 1398–1412
- Patriarch Gregory V of Alexandria, Patriarch in 1484–1486

Bulgaria

- Gregory of Bulgaria, Patriarch c. 940 – c. 960

Armenian Apostolic Church

- Gregory the Illuminator (c. 257 – c. 331), patron saint and first official head of the Armenian Apostolic Church
- Grigoris (catholicos), 4th-century catholicos of Caucasian Albania and martyr
- Gregory II the Martyrophile (1066–1105)
- Grigor III Pahlavuni (1093–1166), Catholicos Gregory III of Cilicia (1113–1166)
- Gregory IV the Young (1173–1193)
- Gregory V of Cilicia (1193–1194)
- Gregory VI of Cilicia (1194–1203)
- Gregory VII of Cilicia (1293–1307)
- Gregory VIII of Cilicia (1411–1418)
- Gregory IX of Cilicia (1439–1446)
- Gregory X of Armenia (1443–1465)
- Gregory XI of Armenia (1536–1545)
- Gregory XII of Armenia (1576–1590)

Armenian Catholic Patriarchs of Cilicia

- Gregory Petros V Kupelian (1788–1812)
- Gregory Petros VI Djeranian (1815–1841)
- Gregory Petros VIII Derasdvazadourian (1844–1866)
- Gregorio Pietro XV Agagianian (1895-1971), Armenian Catholic Patriarch of Cilicia in 1937-1962
- Gregory Peter XX Ghabroyan (1934–2021), Armenian Catholic Patriarch of Cilicia since 2015

== See also ==
- Gregory IV of Athens, Metropolitan of Athens in 1827–1828
- Pope Gregory (disambiguation)
- Saint Gregory (disambiguation)
- Gregory (disambiguation)
- Gregory (given name)
