= Patriarch Gregory of Alexandria =

Patriarch Gregory of Alexandria may refer to:

- Patriarch Gregory I of Alexandria, Greek Patriarch of Alexandria in 1243–1263
- Patriarch Gregory II of Alexandria, Greek Patriarch of Alexandria in 1316–1354
- Patriarch Gregory III of Alexandria, Greek Patriarch of Alexandria in 1354–1366
- Patriarch Gregory IV of Alexandria, Greek Patriarch of Alexandria in 1398–1412
- Patriarch Gregory V of Alexandria, Greek Patriarch of Alexandria in 1484–1486
