= Patriarch Nicholas of Alexandria =

Patriarch Nicholas of Alexandria may refer to:

- Patriarch Nicholas I of Alexandria, Greek Patriarch of Alexandria in 1210–1243
- Patriarch Nicholas II of Alexandria, Greek Patriarch of Alexandria in 1263–1276
- Patriarch Nicholas III of Alexandria, Greek Patriarch of Alexandria in 1389–1398
- Patriarch Nicholas IV of Alexandria, Greek Patriarch of Alexandria in 1412–1417
- Patriarch Nicholas V of Alexandria, Greek Patriarch of Alexandria in 1936–1939
- Patriarch Nicholas VI of Alexandria, Greek Orthodox Patriarch of Alexandria in 1968–1986
