= Patriarch Mark of Alexandria =

Patriarch Mark of Alexandria may refer to:

- Patriarch Mark I of Alexandria, ruled in 43–68
- Patriarch Mark II of Alexandria, ruled in 141–152
- Patriarch Mark III of Alexandria, Greek Patriarch of Alexandria in 1180–1209
- Patriarch Mark IV of Alexandria, Greek Patriarch of Alexandria in 1385–1389
- Patriarch Mark V of Alexandria, Greek Patriarch of Alexandria in 1425–1435
- Patriarch Mark VI of Alexandria, Greek Patriarch of Alexandria in 1459–1484
