= Patriarch Nicholas =

Patriarch Nicholas may refer to:

- Nicholas I of Constantinople, Ecumenical Patriarch in 901–907 and 912–925
- Nicholas II of Constantinople, Ecumenical Patriarch in 984–996
- Nicholas III of Constantinople, Ecumenical Patriarch in 1084–1111
- Nicholas IV of Constantinople, Ecumenical Patriarch in 1147–1151
- Patriarch Nicholas I of Alexandria, Greek Patriarch of Alexandria in 1210–1243
- Patriarch Nicholas II of Alexandria, Greek Patriarch of Alexandria in 1263–1276
- Patriarch Nicholas III of Alexandria, Greek Patriarch of Alexandria in 1389–1398
- Patriarch Nicholas IV of Alexandria, Greek Patriarch of Alexandria in 1412–1417
- Nicholas I Zaya, patriarch of the Chaldean Catholic Church in 1839–1847
- Nicholas (Ziorov), primate of the Orthodox Church in America 1891–1898
- Patriarch Nicholas V of Alexandria, Greek Patriarch of Alexandria in 1936–1939
- Patriarch Nicholas VI of Alexandria, Greek Orthodox Patriarch of Alexandria in 1968–1986
