= Gerasimov =

Gerasimov (Russian: Гера́симов) or Gerasimova (feminine; Гера́симова) is a Russian surname, derived from the given name Gerasim. Notable people with the surname include:

- Aleksei Gerasimov, multiple people
- Aleksandr Mikhailovich Gerasimov (1881–1963), Russian/Soviet painter
- Aleksandr Viktorovich Gerasimov (born 1969), former Russian professional football player
- Dmitry Gerasimov (1465–1536), Russian translator, diplomat, and philologist
- Egor Gerasimov (born 1992), Belarusian tennis player
- Elena Gerasimova (born 2004), Russian artistic gymnast
- Gennadi Gerasimov (1930–2010), Soviet diplomat
- Ivan Aleksandrovich Gerasimov (born 1985), Russian footballer
- Ivan Aleksandrovich Gerasimov (also Herasymov in Ukrainian) (1921–2008), Soviet military general and Ukrainian politician
- Kirill Gerasimov (born 1971), Russian professional poker player
- Konstantin Grigorievich Gerasimov (1912–1985), Russian soloist with the Alexandrov Ensemble
- Mikhail Mikhaylovich Gerasimov (1907–1970), Soviet archaeologist and anthropologist
- Mikhail Prokofyevich Gerasimov (1889–1937), Russian/Soviet poet
- Sergey Gerasimov, multiple people
- Vadim Viktorovich Gerasimov (born 1969), co-developer of the famous videogame Tetris
- Valentin Pavlovich Gerasimov (born 1940), Russian politician
- Valery Vasilyevich Gerasimov (born 1955), Chief of the General Staff of Russia
- Vitaly Petrovich Gerasimov (born 1977), Russian general
- Vladimir Vladimirovich Gerasimov (born 1975), Russian professional football coach and former player
- Vladimir Dmitriyevich Gerasimov (born 1989), Russian professional footballer

== See also ==
- Gerasimov Institute of Cinematography
- Gerasimov Merchant Shop
