= Gerasimos =

Gerasimos (Greek: Γεράσιμος), latinised as Gerasimus and sometimes anglicised as Gerassimos, is a Greek given name derived from "γέρας" ("géras", "gift of honour, prize, reward"). The suffix -ιμος gives the meaning "the one who deserves honour".

== Saints ==
- Gerasimus of the Jordan, monk and abbot of the 5th century; saint
- Gerasimos, Abbot of the Monastery of Saint Symeon, Christian author in Arabic, 12th/13th century; saint
- Gerasimos of Euripos, Orthodox monk, disciple of Gregory of Sinai, missionary in Greece during Frankish occupation (c. 1320s); saint
- Gerasimus of Kefalonia, and monk of the 16th century from the Greek island of Kefalonia; saint

== Orthodox patriarchs and bishops ==
=== Patriarch Gerasimus ===
Patriarch Gerasimus or Patriarch Gerasimos may refer to:

==== Patriarchs of Constantinople ====
- Gerasimus I of Constantinople, Ecumenical Patriarch in 1320–1321
- Gerasimus II of Constantinople, Ecumenical Patriarch in 1673–1674
- Gerasimus III of Constantinople, Ecumenical Patriarch in 1794–1797

==== Patriarchs of Alexandria ====
- Patriarch Gerasimus I of Alexandria, ruled in 1620–1636
- Patriarch Gerasimus II (Palladas) of Alexandria, Greek Patriarch of Alexandria in 1688–1710
- Patriarch Gerasimus III of Alexandria, ruled in 1783–1788

==== Other Orthodox patriarchs ====
- Gerasimus I, Serbian Patriarch, Archbishop of Peć and Serbian Patriarch in 1574–1586
- Gerasimus I of Jerusalem, Greek Orthodox Patriarch of Antioch and later Greek Orthodox Patriarch of Jerusalem in the late 19th century

=== Orthodox bishops ===
- Metropolitan Gerasimos Avlonites, Greek Orthodox bishop of the Diocese of Arcadia in Crete in the 18th century
- Gerasimos Michaleas, bishop of the Greek Orthodox Church of America in the 21st century

== Given name ==
More at "See also: #Related articles"

- Gerasimos Vokos, a Greek writer
- Gerasimos Arsenis, a Greek politician
- Gerasimos Skiadaresis, a Greek actor

== See also ==
=== Related names; similarly sounding names ===
- Gerasim, slavicised form of Gerasimos, for instance Russian: Герасим; IPA: [ɡʲɪˈrasʲɪm])
- Gherasim, Romanian form of Gerasimos
- Erasmus (disambiguation), Latin name derived from Greek: ἐράσμιος (erásmios, “lovely, pleasant, beloved, desired”) > Ἔρασμος (Érasmos) > Erasmus
- Hieronymus, Latin name derived from Ancient Greek Ἱερώνυμος (Hierṓnumos, “holy name”); anglicised to Jerome

=== Related articles ===
- Gerasimos (disambiguation)
