= Patriarch Michael of Alexandria =

Patriarch Michael of Alexandria may refer to:

- Patriarch Michael I of Alexandria, Greek Patriarch of Alexandria in 860–870
- Patriarch Michael II of Alexandria, Greek Patriarch of Alexandria in 870–903
