= Gregory V =

Gregory V may refer to:

- Pope Gregory V, Pope from 996 to 999
- Gregory V of Cilicia 1193–1194
- Patriarch Gregory V of Alexandria, Patriarch of Alexandria from 1484 to 1486
- Patriarch Gregory V of Constantinople, Patriarch of Constantinople from 1797 to 1798, from 1806 to 1808, and from 1818 to 1821
