= Elias of Alexandria =

Elias of Alexandria may refer to:

- Elias (Greek scholar), fl. 6th century, Neoplatonist philosopher
- Patriarch Elias I of Alexandria, Greek Patriarch of Alexandria in 963–1000
- Patriarch Elias II of Alexandria, Greek Patriarch of Alexandria in 1171–1175
