= Patriarch Elias =

Patriarch Elias may refer to:

- Elias I of Jerusalem, Patriarch in 494–516
- Elias III of Jerusalem, Patriarch of Jerusalem from about 879 to 907
- Patriarch Elias I of Alexandria, Greek Patriarch of Alexandria in 963–1000
- Patriarch Elias II of Alexandria, Greek Patriarch of Alexandria in 1171–1175
- Elias Peleti, Latin Patriarch of Jerusalem in 1279–1287
- Elias Peter Hoayek, Maronite Patriarch in 1898–1931
- Ignatius Elias III, Syriac Orthodox Patriarch of Antioch in 1917–1932
- Elias IV of Antioch, Patriarch of the Greek Orthodox Church of Antioch in 1970–1979
