= Patriarch Matthew =

Patriarch Matthew may refer to:

- Patriarch Matthew I of Constantinople, Ecumenical Patriarch of Constantinople in 1397–1410, with a brief interruption in 1402–03
- Pope Matthew I of Alexandria (r. 1378–1408)
- Pope Matthew II of Alexandria (r. 1453–1466)
- Patriarch Matthew II of Constantinople (r. three times, shortly in 1596, from 1598 to 1602 and for a few days in 1603)
- Pope Matthew III of Alexandria (r. 1631–1646)
- Pope Matthew IV of Alexandria (r. 1660–1675)
- Patriarch Matthew of Alexandria, Greek Orthodox Patriarch of Alexandria in 1746–1766
- Matthew I of Armenia (r. 1858–1865), Patriarch and Catholicos of All Armenians
- Matthew II of Armenia (r. 1908–1910), Patriarch and Catholicos of All Armenians
