= Patriarch Sophronius =

Patriarch Sophronius may refer to:

- Sophronius of Jerusalem, ruled in 634–638
- Patriarch Sophronius I of Alexandria, ruled in 841–860
- Sophronius I of Constantinople, ruled in 1463–1464
- Patriarch Sophronius II of Alexandria, Greek Patriarch of Alexandria in 941
- Sophronius II of Constantinople, Ecumenical Patriarch in 1774–1780
- Patriarch Sophronius III of Alexandria, ruled in 1116–1171
- Sophronius III of Constantinople, ruled in 1863–1866
- Patriarch Sophronius IV of Alexandria, ruled in 1870–1899 (same person than Sophronius III of Constantinople)
