= Mark VI of Alexandria =

Mark VI of Alexandria may refer to:

- Patriarch Mark VI of Alexandria, Greek Patriarch of Alexandria in 1459–1484
- Pope Mark VI of Alexandria, ruled in 1646–1656
