= Mark V of Alexandria =

Mark V of Alexandria may refer to:

- Patriarch Mark V of Alexandria, Greek Patriarch of Alexandria in 1425–1435
- Pope Mark V of Alexandria, ruled in 1603–1619
