= Patriarch Gregory I =

Patriarch Gregory I may refer to:

- Gregory I of Constantinople, Patriarch in 379–381
- Gregory of Bulgaria, Patriarch of Bulgaria c. 940 – c. 960
- Patriarch Gregory I of Alexandria, Greek Patriarch of Alexandria in 1243–1263
