= Patriarch Gerasimus of Alexandria =

Patriarch Gerasimus of Alexandria may refer to:

- Patriarch Gerasimus I of Alexandria, ruled in 1620–1636
- Patriarch Gerasimus II (Palladas) of Alexandria, Greek Patriarch of Alexandria in 1688–1710
- Patriarch Gerasimus III of Alexandria, ruled in 1783–1788
