= Patriarch Athanasius of Alexandria =

Patriarch Athanasius of Alexandria may refer to:

- Athanasius of Alexandria, Patriarch of Alexandria in 328–373 or 328–339 and 346–373
- Patriarch Athanasius II of Alexandria, Patriarch of Alexandria in 490–496
- Patriarch Athanasius III of Alexandria, Greek Patriarch of Alexandria in 1276–1316
- Patriarch Athanasius IV of Alexandria, Greek Patriarch of Alexandria in 1417–1425
