= Patriarch Mark VI =

Patriarch Mark VI may refer to:

- Patriarch Mark VI of Alexandria, Greek Patriarch of Alexandria in 1459–1484
- Pope Mark VI of Alexandria, Pope of Alexandria & Patriarch of the See of St. Mark in 1646–1656
