= Patriarch Parthenius of Alexandria =

Patriarch Parthenius of Alexandria may refer to:

- Parthenius I of Alexandria, Greek Patriarch of Alexandria in 1678–1688
- Parthenius II of Alexandria, Greek Patriarch of Alexandria in 1788–1805
- Parthenius III of Alexandria, Greek Orthodox Patriarch of Alexandria in 1987–1996
