= Patriarch Sophronius of Alexandria =

Patriarch Sophronius of Alexandria may refer to:

- Patriarch Sophronius I of Alexandria, ruled in 841–860
- Patriarch Sophronius II of Alexandria, Greek Patriarch of Alexandria in 941
- Patriarch Sophronius III of Alexandria, ruled in 1116–1171
- Patriarch Sophronius IV of Alexandria, ruled in 1870–1899 (same person than Sophronius III of Constantinople)
