= Gregory IV =

Gregory IV can refer to:

- Pope Gregory IV (827–844)
- Gregory IV of Naples (898–915)
- Gregory IV the Young (1173-1193)
- Patriarch Gregory IV of Alexandria (1398–1412)
- Patriarch Gregory IV of Constantinople (1623)
- Gregory IV of Athens (died 1828), Albanian scholar and cleric; Metropolitan of Athens 1827–1828
- Gregory IV of Antioch (1859–1928), Greek Orthodox Patriarch of Antioch 1906–1928
