= Patriarch Michael =

Patriarch Michael may refer to:

- Patriarch Michael I of Alexandria, Greek Patriarch of Alexandria in 860–870
- Patriarch Michael I of Constantinople, Ecumenical Patriarch in 1043–1058
- Patriarch Michael I of Antioch, ruled in 1166–1199
- Patriarch Michael II of Alexandria, Greek Patriarch of Alexandria in 870–903
- Michael II of Constantinople, Ecumenical Patriarch in 1143–1146
- Patriarch Michael II of Antioch, head of the Syriac Orthodox Church in 1292–1312
- Patriarch Michael II Fadel, ruled in 1793–1795
- Michael III of Constantinople, Ecumenical Patriarch in 1170–1178
- Michael IV of Constantinople, Ecumenical Patriarch in 1207–1213
