= Patriarch Mark V =

Patriarch Mark V may refer to:

- Patriarch Mark V of Alexandria, Greek Patriarch of Alexandria in 1425–1435
- Pope Mark V of Alexandria, Pope of Alexandria & Patriarch of the See of St. Mark in 1603–1619
