= Patriarch Matthew I =

Patriarch Matthew I may refer to:

- Pope Matthew I of Alexandria, Pope of Alexandria & Patriarch of the See of St. Mark in 1378–1408
- Matthew I of Constantinople, Ecumenical Patriarch of Constantinople from 1397 to 1410, with a brief interruption in 1402–03
- Patriarch Matthew of Alexandria, Greek Orthodox Patriarch of Alexandria in 1746–1766
- Matthew I of Armenia (r. 1858–1865), Patriarch and Catholicos of All Armenians
