= Patriarch Michael II =

Patriarch Michael II may refer to:

- Patriarch Michael II of Alexandria, Greek Patriarch of Alexandria in 870–903
- Michael II of Constantinople, Ecumenical Patriarch in 1143–1146
- Patriarch Michael II of Antioch, head of the Syriac Orthodox Church in 1292–1312
- Patriarch Michael II Fadel, ruled in 1793–1795
