= Isaac of Alexandria =

Isaac of Alexandria may refer to:

- Pope Isaac of Alexandria, ruled in 690–692
- Patriarch Isaac of Alexandria, Greek Patriarch of Alexandria in 941–954
