= George of Alexandria =

George of Alexandria may refer to:

- George of Laodicea, bishop of Laodicea in 335–347, a native of Alexandria
- George of Cappadocia, Arian patriarch of Alexandria in 356–361
- Patriarch George I of Alexandria, ruled in 621–631
- Patriarch George II of Alexandria, ruled in 1021–1051
