= Patriarch Metrophanes =

Patriarch Metrophanes may refer to:

- Patriarch Metrophanes II of Constantinople, reigned from 1440 to 1443
- Patriarch Metrophanes III of Constantinople, reigned from 1565 to 1572 and from 1579 to 1580
- Patriarch Metrophanes of Alexandria (Mêtrophanês Kritopoulos), reigned between 1636 and 1639
