= Patriarch Nicholas III =

Patriarch Nicholas III may refer to:

- Patriarch Nicholas III of Antioch, ruled in 1000–1003
- Nicholas III of Constantinople, Ecumenical Patriarch in 1084–1111
- Patriarch Nicholas III of Alexandria, Greek Patriarch of Alexandria in 1389–1398
