= Patriarch Niphon =

Patriarch Niphon may refer to:

- Patriarch Nephon I of Constantinople, Ecumenical Patriarch in 1310–1314
- Patriarch Niphon of Alexandria, Greek Patriarch of Alexandria in 1366–1385
- Patriarch Nephon II of Constantinople (Saint Niphon), Ecumenical Patriarch in 1486–1488, 1497–1498 and 1502
