= Patriarch Alexander =

Patriarch Alexander may refer to:

- Pope Alexander I of Alexandria, ruled in 313–326 or 328
- Patriarch Alexander of Constantinople, ruled in 314–337
- Patriarch Alexander II of Alexandria, Greek Patriarch of Alexandria in 1059–1062
