= Patriarch Nicephorus =

Patriarch Nicephorus I may refer to:

- Nikephoros I of Constantinople, Ecumenical Patriarch in 806–815
- Nicephorus II of Constantinople, Ecumenical Patriarch in 1260–1261
- Patriarch Nicephorus of Alexandria, Greek Patriarch of Alexandria in 1639–1645
