= Patriarch Jacob =

Patriarch Jacob may refer to:

- Jacob, one of the biblical Patriarchs
- Patriarch Jacob of Alexandria
- Patriarch Jacob I, Maronite Patriarch of Antioch in 1141–1151
- Patriarch Jacob II, Maronite Patriarch of Antioch in 1277–1278
- Patriarch Jacob III, Maronite Patriarch of Antioch in 1445–1468
- Patriarch Jacob IV, Maronite Patriarch of Antioch in 1705–1733
