= Theophilus II =

Theophilus II may refer to:

- Theophilus II (Coptic patriarch of Alexandria) (ruled 952–956)
- Theophilus II (Greek patriarch of Alexandria) (ruled 1010–1020), Greek Patriarch of Alexandria
- Theophilus II of Jerusalem (ruled 1417–1424), Greek Orthodox Patriarch of Jerusalem
