= Patriarch Nicholas IV =

Patriarch Nicholas IV may refer to:

- Nicholas IV of Constantinople, Ecumenical Patriarch in 1147–1151
- Patriarch Nicholas IV of Alexandria, Greek Patriarch in 1412–1417
