= Patriarch Nicholas II =

Patriarch Nicholas II may refer to:

- Patriarch Nicholas II of Antioch, ruled in 860–879
- Nicholas II of Constantinople, Ecumenical Patriarch in 984–996
- Patriarch Nicholas II of Alexandria, Greek Patriarch of Alexandria in 1263–1276
