= Patriarch Peter V =

Patriarch Peter V may refer to:

- Patriarch Peter V of Alexandria, Greek Patriarch of Alexandria sometime between the 7th and 8th centuries
- Pope Peter V of Alexandria, Pope of Alexandria & Patriarch of the See of St. Mark in 1340–1348
