= Mark V =

Mark V or Mark 5 may refer to:

== Technology ==
=== Military and weaponry ===
- BL 13.5 inch Mk V naval gun (1912); British gun that was a defining feature of the super-dreadnought Orion-class battleships
- QF 4 inch Mk V naval gun (1914); British naval gun used for coastal defense and anti-aircraft
- Mark V tank, a series of variations of the World War I Mark I tank
  - Mark V Composite tank in Estonian service; specific design and service of the Mark V tank as used by Estonia
- BL 8-inch howitzer Mk I – V; World War I British gun, heavy and short-range
- Mk 5 mine (1943); British anti-tank mine used in World War II
- Supermarine Spitfire Mk V; 1941 British fighter aircraft augmented with high-altitude capability
- Mark 5 nuclear bomb (1952–1963), an American weapon
- Mark V Special Operations Craft (1995), a United States Navy security/patrol/transport boat
- Weatherby Mark V, a rifle series
- MarkV-A1, a bomb disposal robot
- Mk V or Covenanter tank, a World War II British Cruiser tank

=== Other vehicles ===
- Bentley Mark V (1931–1941), a British luxury car
- Jaguar Mark V (1948–1951), a British saloon car
- Lincoln Continental Mark V (1960, 1977–1979), an American luxury car
- Mark V monorail (1987–2008), a monorail train used at Disneyland in California
- Volkswagen Golf Mk V (2003–2009), a 3 or 5 door hatchback with many styling and performance options
- British Rail Mark 5 (InterCity 250), an unbuilt type of coach intended as part of the planned InterCity 250 project for the West Coast Main Line
- British Rail Mark 5, a type of passenger coach used for the Caledonian Sleeper
- British Rail Mark 5A, a type of coach to be used by TransPennine Express
- Cooper Mk.V, a Formula Three racing car

== People ==
- Pope Mark V of Alexandria, the Coptic Pope of Alexandria and Patriarch of the See of St. Mark between 1610 and 1621
- Patriarch Mark V of Alexandria, the Orthodox Patriarch of Alexandria between 1425 and 1435
- Mark V Shaney; fake Usenet user that used Markov chain techniques to determine 'his' post text

== Other uses ==
- Mark 5 or Mark V, the fifth chapter of the Gospel of Mark in the New Testament of the Christian Bible
- The Mark V in the Mesa Boogie Mark Series, a guitar amplifier

== See also ==
- Mach Five, a fictional racing car in the Speed Racer anime series
