= Alexander of Alexandria =

Alexander of Alexandria may refer to:

- Pope Alexander I of Alexandria, Patriarch of Alexandria in 313 – 326 or 328
- Pope Alexander II of Alexandria, ruled in 702–729
- Patriarch Alexander II of Alexandria, Greek Patriarch of Alexandria in 1059–1062
