= Gerasimus III =

Gerasimus III may refer to:

- Patriarch Gerasimus III of Alexandria, ruled in 1783–1788
- Gerasimus III of Constantinople, Ecumenical Patriarch in 1794–1797
