= Patriarch Cosmas I =

Patriarch Cosmas I may refer to:

- Patriarch Cosmas I of Alexandria, Greek Patriarch of Alexandria in 727–768
- Cosmas I of Constantinople, Ecumenical Patriarch in 1075–1081
