= Alexander II of Alexandria =

Alexander II of Alexandria may refer to:

- Pope Alexander II of Alexandria, Coptic patriarch in 702–729
- Patriarch Alexander II of Alexandria, Greek patriarch in 1059–1062
