= Patriarch Alexander of Alexandria =

Patriarch Alexander of Alexandria may refer to:

- Patriarch Alexander I of Alexandria, Patriarch of Alexandria in 313–326 or 328
- Patriarch Alexander II of Alexandria, Greek Patriarch of Alexandria in 1059–1062
