= Alexandros II =

Alexandros II may refer to:

- Alexander II of Macedon, king of Macedon in 371–369 BC
- Pope Alexander II of Alexandria, ruled in 702–729
- Patriarch Alexander II of Alexandria, Greek Patriarch of Alexandria in 1059–1062
