= Philotheos of Alexandria =

Philotheos of Alexandria may refer to:

- Philotheos (Coptic patriarch of Alexandria), reigned 979–1003
- Philotheos (Greek patriarch of Alexandria), reigned 1435–1459
