= Patriarch Elias I =

Patriarch Elias I may refer to:

- Elias I of Jerusalem, Patriarch in 494–516
- Patriarch Elias I of Alexandria, Greek Patriarch of Alexandria in 963–1000
- Elias Peter Hoayek, Maronite Patriarch in 1898–1931
