= Patriarch Gregory II =

Patriarch Gregory II may refer to:

- Gregory II of Constantinople, Ecumenical Patriarch of Constantinople in 1283–1289
- Patriarch Gregory II of Alexandria, Greek Patriarch of Alexandria in 1316–1354
