= Gregory VI =

Gregory VI may refer to:

- Pope Gregory VI, John Gratian, elected 1045; abdicated at the Council of Sutri in 1046; died 1048
- Antipope Gregory VI, first to claim to be pope as successor to Sergius IV
- Gregory VI of Cilicia a.k.a. Gregory VI Apirat or Grigor VI Apirat, catholicos of the Armenian Church
- Ecumenical Patriarch Gregory VI of Constantinople (1798–1881), Georgios Fourtouniadis, reigned 1835–1840 and 1867–1871
