= Cosmas I =

Cosmas I may refer to:

- Pope Cosmas I of Alexandria, ruled in 729–730
- Patriarch Cosmas I of Alexandria, Greek Patriarch of Alexandria in 727–768
- Cosmas I of Constantinople, Ecumenical Patriarch in 1075–1081
