= Patriarch Philotheus =

Patriarch Philotheus may refer to:

- Patriarch Philotheus of Alexandria, Greek Patriarch of Alexandria in 1435–1459
- Philotheus I of Constantinople, Ecumenical Patriarch three times in 1353–1354, 1354 and 1364–1376
