= Patriarch Gregory III =

Patriarch Gregory III may refer to:

- Patriarch Gregory III of Alexandria, Greek Patriarch of Alexandria in 1354–1366
- Gregory III of Constantinople, Ecumenical Patriarch of Constantinople in 1443–1450
- Gregory III Laham, Melkite Patriarch of Antioch in 2000-2017
