= Patriarch Nicholas I =

Patriarch Nicholas I may refer to:

- Patriarch Nicholas I of Antioch, ruled in 826–834
- Patriarch Nicholas I of Constantinople (Nicholas Mystikos), Ecumenical Patriarch in 901–907 and 912–925
- Patriarch Nicholas I of Alexandria, Greek Patriarch of Alexandria in 1210–1243
- Nicholas I Zaya, patriarch of the Chaldean Catholic Church in 1839–1847
