= MKV =

MKV may refer to:

- .mkv, a filename extension for the Matroska multimedia container format
- Mittelschüler-Kartellverband, an Austrian male fraternity organization
- Multiple Kill Vehicle, U.S. missile defense program
- Mavea language, ISO 639-3 language code mkv

== See also ==
- Mark V (disambiguation), abbreviated as Mk V
