= Patriarch Joannicius I =

Patriarch Joannicius I may refer to:

- Joannicius I of Constantinople, Ecumenical Patriarch in 1524–1525
- Patriarch Joannicius of Alexandria, Greek Patriarch of Alexandria 1645–1657
