= Patriarch Mark IV =

Patriarch Mark IV may refer to:

- Pope Mark IV of Alexandria, Pope of Alexandria & Patriarch of the See of St. Mark in 1348–1363
- Patriarch Mark IV of Alexandria, Greek Patriarch of Alexandria in 1385–1389
