= Hierotheus II of Alexandria =

Greek Patriarch of Alexandria from 1847 to 1858

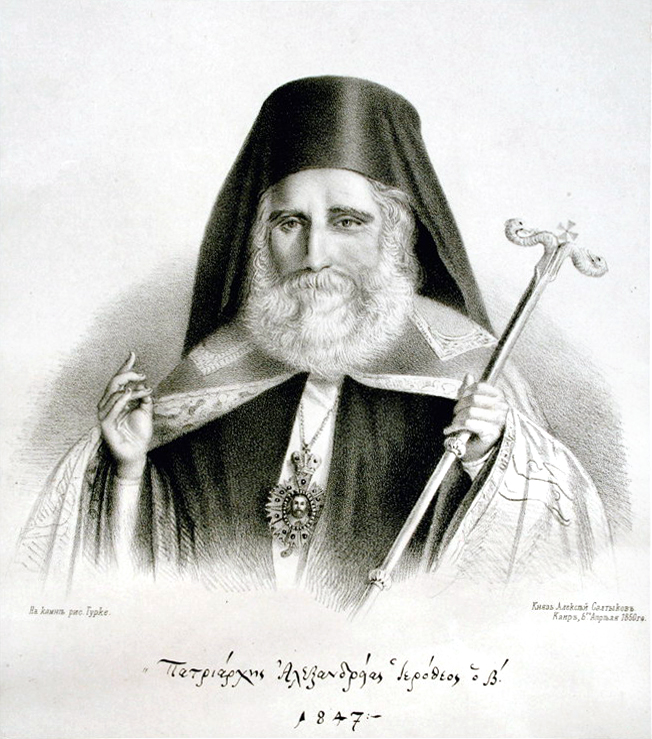
Patriarch Hierotheus II of Alexandria.

Hierotheus II (Greek: Ιερόθεος Β΄) served as Greek Orthodox Patriarch of Alexandria between 1847 and 1858. He was born in Sifnos.

Hierotheus was a signatory to the Encyclical of the Eastern Patriarchs, a reply sent in May 1848 to Pope Pius IX's letter In Suprema Petri Apostoli Sede calling for the Eastern churches to reunite with Rome. He established the Church of the Annunciation of the Theotokos in Alexandria and also founded the Hellenic Girls' School in the city.

| Preceded by Artemius | Greek Orthodox Patriarch of Alexandria; 1847–1858 | Succeeded by Callinicus |
