= Joachim I =

Joachim I may refer to:

- Joachim I, Primate of Bulgaria in 1232–1246
- Patriarch Joachim I of Constantinople (r. 1498–1502 and 1504)
- Joachim I Nestor, Elector of Brandenburg (1484–1535)
- Patriarch Joachim of Alexandria (r. 1486–1567)
- Patriarch Joachim of Moscow and All Russia (1620–1690)
- Joachim I of Naples (1767–1815)
