= Parthenius II =

Parthenius II may refer to:

- Parthenius II of Constantinople, Ecumenical Patriarch of Constantinople in 1644–1646 and 1648–1651
- Parthenius II of Alexandria, Greek Patriarch of Alexandria in 1788–1805
