= Peter V of Alexandria =

Peter V of Alexandria may refer to:

- Patriarch Peter V of Alexandria, Greek Patriarch of Alexandria in the 7th–8th centuries
- Pope Peter V of Alexandria, ruled in 1340–1348
