= Patriarch Cyril of Alexandria =

Patriarch Cyril of Alexandria may refer to:

- Cyril of Alexandria, ruled in 412–444
- Patriarch Cyril II of Alexandria, ruled in the 12th century
- Patriarch Cyril III of Alexandria, ruled in 1601–20
