= Mark IV of Alexandria =

Mark IV of Alexandria may refer to:

- Pope Mark IV of Alexandria, ruled in 1348–1363
- Patriarch Mark IV of Alexandria, Greek Patriarch of Alexandria in 1385–1389
