= Patriarch Athanasius III =

Patriarch Athanasius III may refer to:

- Patriarch Athanasius III of Alexandria (ruled 1276–1316)
- Athanasius III Dabbas (1647–1724)
