= Mark III of Alexandria =

Mark III of Alexandria may refer to:

- Pope Mark III of Alexandria, ruled in 1166–1189
- Patriarch Mark III of Alexandria, Greek Patriarch of Alexandria in 1180–1209
