= John VI of Alexandria =

John VI of Alexandria may refer to:

- Patriarch John VI of Alexandria, Greek Patriarch of Alexandria in 1062–1100
- Pope John VI of Alexandria, ruled in 1189–1216
