= Patriarch Peter VI =

Patriarch Peter VI may refer to:

- Patriarch Peter VI of Alexandria, Greek Patriarch of Alexandria sometime between the 7th and 8th centuries.
- Pope Peter VI of Alexandria, Pope of Alexandria & Patriarch of the See of St. Mark in 1718–1726
