= Patriarch Joachim I =

Patriarch Joachim I may refer to:

- Patriarch Joachim I of Bulgaria (r. 1234–1246)
- Patriarch Joachim I of Constantinople (r. 1498–1502 and 1504)
- Patriarch Joachim of Alexandria (1486–1567)
- Patriarch Joachim of Moscow and All Russia (1620–1690)
