= Patriarch Sophronius III =

Patriarch Sophronius III may refer to:

- Patriarch Sophronius III of Alexandria, ruled in 1116–1171
- Sophronius III of Constantinople, ruled in 1863–1866
