= Patriarch Gregory IV =

Patriarch Gregory IV may refer to:

- Patriarch Gregory IV of Alexandria, Greek Patriarch of Alexandria in 1398–1412
- Gregory IV of Constantinople, Ecumenical Patriarch of Constantinople in 1623
- Gregory IV of Antioch (1859–1928), Greek Orthodox Patriarch of Antioch 1906–1928
