= Gerasimus I =

Gerasimus I may refer to:

- Gerasimus I of Constantinople, Ecumenical Patriarch in 1320–1321
- Patriarch Gerasimus I of Alexandria, ruled in 1620–1636
