= Patriarch Callinicus I =

Patriarch Callinicus I may refer to:

- Callinicus I of Constantinople, Ecumenical Patriarch in 693–705
- Kalinik I, Patriarch of the Serbs in 1691–1710
- Patriarch Callinicus of Alexandria, Greek Patriarch of Alexandria in 1858–1861
