= Artemius of Alexandria =

Greek Patriarch of Alexandria from 1845 to 1847

Artemius served as Greek Orthodox Patriarch of Alexandria between 1845 and 1847.

Preceded by Hierotheus I	Greek Orthodox Patriarch of Alexandria; 1845–1847	Succeeded by Hierotheus II
