= Pope John XV of Alexandria =

Head of the Coptic Church from 1619 to 1629

- Pope of Alexandria & Patriarch of the See of St. Mark
- Papacy began: 18 September 1619; 7 Thout 1336
- Papacy ended: 7 September 1629; 2 Pi Kogi Enavot 1346
- Predecessor: Mark V
- Successor: Matthew III

Personal details
- Born: Mallawi, Egypt
- Died: 7 September 1629; 2 Pi Kogi Enavot 1346 Egypt
- Buried: St. Anba Bishih Monastery, El-Bayadia, Egypt
- Denomination: Coptic Orthodox Christian
- Residence: Church of the Virgin Mary (Haret Zuweila)

Pope John XV of Alexandria (Abba Yoannis El-Mallawany; died 7 September 1629) was the 99th Pope of Alexandria & Patriarch of the See of St. Mark. Originally from Mallawi in Egypt, he was a monk in the Monastery of Saint Anthony before being consecrated Patriarch on the 7th day of Thout, 1336 A.M. (September 18, 1619 A.D.). Known for his great modesty and piety, John XV was devoted to ministry, prayer, and worship. He exemplified zeal in guiding the Coptic church and in showing compassion to his priests, the poor, and strangers.

In 1623 A.D., John visited and ministered in Upper Egypt, which was suffering under a devastating plague. In 1629 A.D., another severe epidemic spread through the land, prompting the Pope to make a second trip to Upper Egypt in the second year of the epidemic. During his return journey to Cairo he stayed in the city of Abnub. While staying in a house John reportedly rebuked the owner for keeping concubines. He then became ill, possibly from being poisoned by his host. John died shortly afterward and was buried in the monastery of the Saint Anba Bishih in El-Bayadia, Egypt; he was patriarch for nine years, eleven months and twenty-two days.

Oriental Orthodox titles
| Preceded by Mark V | Coptic Pope; 1619–1629 | Succeeded by Matthew III |
