= Nilus of Pentapolis =

Greek Orthodox Patriarch

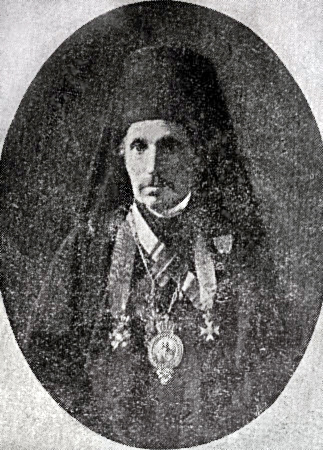

Nilus (Greek: Νείλος; 1809 – November 12, 1887) was metropolitan of Pentapolis under Patriarchate of Constantinople (1872–1887), and Greek Orthodox Patriarch of Alexandria during 1869–1870.

== Biography ==
Born in Gallipoli in Eastern Thrace in 1809. In 1830 he went to Mount Athos, where Archimandrite Agathangel, abbot of the monastery Esphigmenou and his countryman, received him to the monastery brethren. In Esphigmenou he was tonsured a monk with the name Nilus. After a while, he fell ill with tuberculosis and was sent to Greek doctors in Smyrna for treatment. In addition to monastic work, Nilus was engaged in self-education and the study of foreign languages. As a result, Neil gained fame as one of the most educated people among Greeks.

His administrative abilities and scholarship were noticed, and Archimandrite Agathangel sent him to Moldavia to manage one of the monastic estates. In the town of Huși, in the church of St. Elijah the Prophet, he was ordained a hieromonk by the local bishop. Soon Archimandrite Nilus was appointed to manage a large and wealthy Esphigmenou metoch in Florești, Bessarabia, then also to Three Saints Hierarchs metochs. At that time he was called Nilus the Esphigmenite (Greek: Νείλος ο Εσφιγμενίτης) or Nilus Trierarchitis (Greek: Νεῖλος Τριεραρχίτης).

He was a supporter of Patriarch Nicanor of Alexandria in the unfolding difficult conflict between supporters and opponents of Patriarch Nicanor, who took the patriarchal throne in 1866. The opposition to Patriarch Nicanor was led by Archimandrite Eugene, who was appointed patriarchal epitrope and locum tenens of the Patriarchal Throne by the Council of Representatives of Local Greek Communities hostile to the Patriarch, which according to the charter was to manage the church jointly with the Patriarch and the Synod. Archimandrite Eugene and his followers succeeded in expelling two metropolitans who remained loyal to the patriarch from Egypt. In response to the actions of the communities and the Egyptian government, Patriarch Nicanor announced the appointment of Archimandrite Nilus from the monastery of Esphigmen as his successor and locum tenens.

Archimandrite Eugene, whose powers were recognized by the local authorities, decided to seize the patriarchal residence in Cairo with the help of his supporters and the police. On July 2, 1867, a fight involving the police ensued, resulting in many injuries among the participants, and the residence itself was looted by soldiers. This action severely undermined Archimandrite Eugene's credibility. In response, Patriarch Nicanor held a council in Alexandria from July 24–27, 1867, condemning the interference of the Church of Constantinople and confirming the legitimacy of Nilus as heir and locum tenens of the Patriarchal Throne; Archimandrite Eugene was defrocked.

By the end of May 1868, Archimandrite Eugene, having lost all hope of achieving his goal, left Egypt. On June 6, Patriarch Nicanor returned to his residence, but the question of his successor remained open. The Greek communities of Egypt refused to recognize Archimandrite Nilus. On March 16, 1869, Patriarch Nicanor of Alexandria, along with Metropolitan Amphilochius of Pilusia, Metropolitan Theophanes of Tripoli, and Metropolitan Spyridon of Kirineya, ordained Archimandrite Nilus as Metropolitan of Pentapolis. On March 19, 1869, Patriarch Nicanor officially handed over the reins of government to Nilus, appointing him as the Patriarch of Alexandria. The Patriarchs of Antioch and Jerusalem quickly recognized Metropolitan Nilus as the "canonically and legitimately appointed Patriarch of Alexandria." Initially, the Egyptian authorities did not prevent the approval of Nilus as the primate of the Church of Alexandria.

On August 9, 1869, Nicanor sent a message to the first member of the Most Holy Synod, Metropolitan Isidore (Nikolsky), with a request to recognize the election of the Nilus and promote its approval by the Egyptian government. Having described in detail the previous events, the patriarch reported that the Great Church had again interfered in the internal affairs of the Church of Alexandria. This time, Patriarch Gregory VI of Constantinople refused to recognize the legitimacy of the election of Metropolitan Nilus not only to the patriarchal throne, but also the legitimacy of his episcopal consecration, referring to the fact that he, as a monk of the Mount Athos, was under the jurisdiction of the Patriarch of Constantinople and had, according to Constantinople, to obtain the permission of the Patriarch of Constantinople, which it was not given to him. On September 22, 1869, the Holy Synod of the Patriarchate of Constantinople deprived Nilus of the dignity of a priest, leaving him the title of a monk. The firman prepared by the Egyptian authorities was not handed over to the Nilus. Almost the main participant in the intrigue, the patriarch also called the Russian Consul General Ivan de Lex, who acted independently of the Russian Ambassador in Constantinople and was unfriendly to both Patriarch Nicanor and his successor Nilus.

The Synod of the Church of Greece in Athens sent its representative, Bishop David of Phocis, to Constantinople. A private message to the Patriarch of Constantinople on behalf of Metropolitan Theophilus of Athens stated that under the circumstances, neither Eugene nor Nilus "should be elevated to the rank of Patriarch, and peace can only be established by the election of a third person." Having found full understanding in Constantinople, Bishop David went to the Patriarch of Antioch, hoping to persuade him to abandon the support of the Nilus.

In a letter to Archimandrite Antonin (Kapustin) in Jerusalem dated September 12, 1869, the Russian ambassador to Constantinople Nikolay Ignatiev, who had previously supported Patriarch Nicanor and his successor Nilus, wrote: "The turmoil in the entire Eastern Church is appalling. Nilos, despite his sneakiness, did not know how to do his business in Egypt and we have to agree to his removal. The trouble is with the Throne of Alexandria, which has become the playground of several merchants".

On December 25, 1869, Patriarch Nicanor died. The position of the "appointed" Patriarch Nilus, despite his recognition by the Patriarchs of Antioch and Jerusalem, has become critical. Ignatiev advised him to resign, but Nilus persisted. In a letter dated January 7, 1870, Ignatiev wrote: "Nilus has set everyone against himself and can only hold on with my help, but he does not want to leave voluntarily, counting on the moral assistance of the Patriarch of Jerusalem and Antioch. You cannot imagine what the mutual bitterness of the parties has come to (merchants, doctors, educated and decent people — against Nilos — unanimously). There are several lawyers for him (four, I think) and the lowest, rude class of the people. Local elections are impossible, because it will come to a massacre. I persuaded the ruler of Egypt to promise to present to the three Patriarchs to enter into an agreement on this issue — this time — giving them the choice of the future Patriarch, in addition to Eugene and Nilos, who each have their own small party mutually hostile. What does His Beatitude Kirill think? It is necessary to find some kind of outcome to the ugly situation of the Patriarchate of Alexandria, which has become a plaything of passions, a laughing stock of gentiles and a disgrace to Orthodoxy".

On May 30, 1870, the retired Patriarch Sophrony of Constantinople became Patriarch of Alexandria, whose candidacy was agreed upon in July of the same year between the Patriarch of Constantinople on the one hand and the Patriarchs of Antioch and Jerusalem on the other. He managed to bring peace into the life of the Egyptian flock. On October 21 of the same year, the former Patriarch Nilus left Alexandria, and on October 28 of the year he acknowledged his resignation.

He settled in his homeland in Galipoli. On June 10, 1872, the Holy Synod of the Patriarchate of Constantinople abolished the deprivation of dignity, recognized his episcopal consecration as lawful and restored him as Metropolitan of Pentapolis, but under the jurisdiction of the Patriarchate of Constantinople.

He died on November 12, 1887, in the village of Dafni on Mount Athos.

== Literature ==
- Петрунина, Ольга; Вах, Кирилл (2014). "Слабоумие Александрийского патриарха Никанора (1866—1869): правда или вымысел?". Каптеревские чтения: Сборник статей. Вып. 12 (in Russian). Moscow: 82–97.
- Петрунина, Ольга (2017). "Переписка посла в Константинополе Н. П. Игнатьева с митрополитом Нилом Пентапольским (1863—1878)". Православный палестинский сборник. Вып. 114 (in Russian). Moscow: 309–330.
- Петрунина, Ольга (2017). "Митрополит Нил Пентапольский и его роль в греко-российских церковных отношениях второй половины XIX в". Вестник ПСТГУ. Серия II: История. История Русской Православной Церкви (in Russian) (79). Moscow: 30–45.
- Петрунина О. Е. Нил // Православная энциклопедия. — М., 2018. — Т. LI: «Никон — Ноилмара». — С. 115–116. — 752 с. — ISBN 978-5-89572-058-5.

Preceded by Nicanor	Greek Patriarch of Alexandria; 1869–1870	Succeeded by Sophronius IV
