= List of Greek Orthodox patriarchs of Alexandria =

The Greek Orthodox patriarch of Alexandria has the title Pope and Patriarch of Alexandria and all Africa. The term "Greek" is a religious identifier and not an ethnic one; while many of these patriarchs were ethnic Greeks, some were Hellenized Egyptians, and others were Melkite Arabs.

== List of patriarchs ==
Following the Council of Chalcedon in 451, a schism occurred in Egypt, between those who accepted and those who rejected the decisions of the council. The former are known as Chalcedonians and the latter are known as miaphysites. Over the next several decades, these two parties competed for the See of Alexandria and frequently still recognized the same Patriarch. But after 536, they permanently established separate patriarchates, and have maintained separate lineages of Patriarchs ever since. The miaphysites became the Coptic Church (part of Oriental Orthodoxy) and the Chalcedonians became the Greek Orthodox Church of Alexandria (part of the wider Eastern Orthodox Church).

For the list of patriarchs until 536 see List of patriarchs of Alexandria.

=== Chalcedonian patriarchs of Alexandria after 536 ===
41. Gainas (536), Chalcedonian.
42. Paul of Tabennesis (537-540), Chalcedonian.
43. Zoilus (540–551), Chalcedonian.
44. Apollinarius (551–569), Chalcedonian.
45. John IV (569–580), Chalcedonian.
46. Eulogius I (581–608), Chalcedonian.
47. Theodore I (608–610), Chalcedonian.
48. John V Eleemon (610–621), Chalcedonian.
49. George I (621–630), Chalcedonian.
50. Cyrus (631–641), Chalcedonian.
51. Peter IV (642–651), Chalcedonian.

The Muslim conquest caused the Chalcedonian see of Alexandria to become vacant.

=== Chalcedonian patriarchs of Alexandria after the Islamic conquest ===
After 727, the Byzantine emperor Leo III once more attempted to install a Melkite patriarch in Alexandria. With the consent of the Muslim authorities the bishopric was, from that moment onwards, again headed by a patriarch.

50. Theodore II
51. Peter V
52. Peter VI
  Theophylactus
  Onopsus
53. Cosmas I (727–768)
54. Politianus (768–813)
55. Eustatius (813–817)
56. Christopher I (817–841)
57. Sophronius I (841–860)
58. Michael I (860–870)
59. Michael II (870–903)
  vacant (903–907)
60. Christodoulos (907–932)
61. Eutychius (932–940)
62. Sophronius II (941)
63. Isaac (941–954)
64. Job (954–960)
  vacant (960–963)
65. Elias I (963–1000)
66. Arsenius (1000–1010)
67. Theophilus (1010–1020)
68. George II (1021–1051)
69. Leontius (1052–1059)
70. Alexander II (1059–1062)
71. John VI Kodonatos (1062–1100)
  Eulogius II (1100–1117) Coadjutor?
72. Cyril II (1100– )
73. Sabbas (1117– )
  Theodosius II ( –1137) Coadjutor?
74. Sophronius III (1137–1171)
75. Elias II (1171–1175)
76. Eleutherius (1175–1180)
77. Mark III (1180–1209)
78. Nicholas I (1210–1243)
79. Gregory I (1243–1263)
80. Nicholas II (1263–1276)
81. Athanasius III (1276–1316)
82. Gregory II (1316–1354)
83. Gregory III (1354–1366)
84. Niphon (1366–1385)
85. Mark IV (1385–1389)
86. Nicholas III (1389–1398)
87. Gregory IV (1398–1412)
88. Nicholas IV (1412–1417)
89. Athanasius IV (1417–1425)
90. Mark V (1425–1435)
91. Philotheus (1435–1459)
92. Mark VI (1459–1484)
93. Gregory V (1484–1486)
94. Joachim Pany (1486–1567)
  vacant (1567–1569)
95. Silvester (1569–1590)
96. Meletius I (1590–1601)
97. Cyril III Loucaris (1601–1620)
98. Gerasimus I Spartaliotes (1620–1636)
99. Metrophanes Kritikopoulos (1636–1639)
100. Nicephorus (1639–1645)
101. Joannicius (1645–1657)
102. Paisius (1657–1678)
103. Parthenius I (1678–1688)
104. Gerasimus II Paladas (1688–1710)
105. Samuel Kapasoulis (1710–1712)
106. Cosmas II (1712–1714)
  Samuel (restored) (1714–1723)
  Cosmas II (restored) (1723–1736)
107. Cosmas III (1737–1746)
108. Matthew Psaltis (1746–1766)
109. Cyprian (1766–1783)
110. Gerasimus III Gimaris (1783–1788)
111. Parthenius II Pankostas (1788–1805)
112. Theophilus III Pankostas (1805–1825)
113. Hierotheus I (1825–1845)
114. Artemius (1845–1847)
115. Hierotheus II (1847–1858)
116. Callinicus (1858–1861)
117. Jacob (1861–1865)
118. Nicanor (1866–1869)
119. Nilus (1869–1870)
120. Sophronius IV (1870–1899)
121. Photius (1900–1925)
122. Meletius II Metaxakis (1926–1935)
123. Nicholas V (1936–1939)
124. Christopher II (1939–1966)
  vacant (1966–1968)
125. Nicholas VI (1968–1986)
126. Parthenius III (1986–1996)
127. Peter VII (1997–2004)
128. Theodore II (2004–present)

== See also ==
- Greek Orthodox Patriarchate of Alexandria
- List of patriarchs of Alexandria, for the earlier Patriarchs of Alexandria prior to the schism.
- List of popes of the Coptic Orthodox Church, for the Popes of the Coptic Orthodox Church.
