= Patriarch Leontius of Alexandria =

Greek Patriarch of Alexandria, 1052–1059

Leontius served as the Greek Patriarch of Alexandria between 1052 and 1059. He was succeeded by Alexander II (1059–1062) as the patriarch of Alexandria.

Eastern Orthodox Church titles
Preceded by George II	Greek Patriarch of Alexandria; 1052–1059	Succeeded by Alexander II
