= Cathedral of the Annunciation, Alexandria =

Coordinates: 31°11′43″N 29°53′45.42″E

Annunciation Cathedral
- Holy Cathedral Church of the Annunciation of the Theotokos
- Ιερός Καθεδρικός Ναός Ευαγγελισμού της Θεοτόκου Αλεξάνδρειας (Greek)
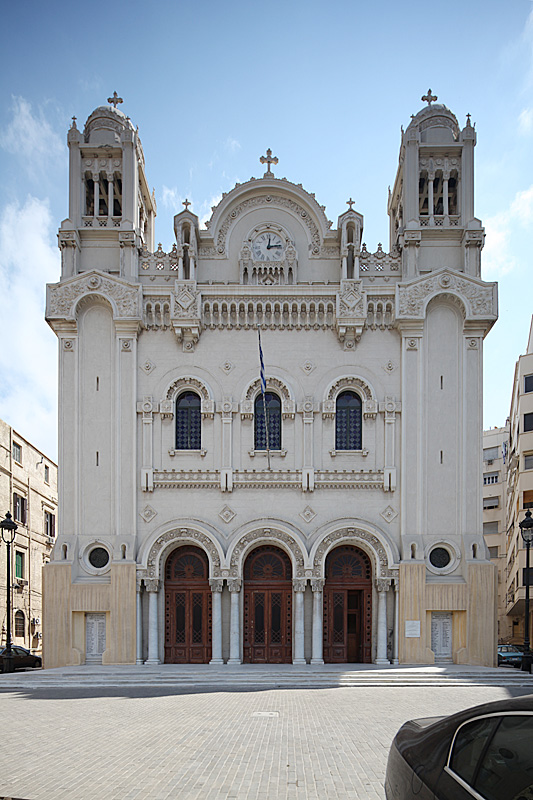
- Main façade of the Cathedral of Evangelismos

- Location in Alexandria
- Location: Alexandria
- Country: Egypt
- Denomination: Greek Orthodox Church
- Tradition: Byzantine Rite
- Website: Greek Patriarchate of Alexandria

History
- Status: Patriarchal Cathedral
- Dedication: Annunciation
- Consecrated: 25 March 1856

Architecture
- Architects: Ermetes Pierotis; Lukowitz; Luigi Storari
- Style: Neo-Byzantine and Neo-Gothic
- Groundbreaking: 1847
- Completed: 25 March 1856

Specifications
- Length: 41.8 metres (137 ft)
- Width: 23.6 metres (77 ft)
- Height: 32.4 metres (106 ft)

The Holy Cathedral Church of the Annunciation of the Theotokos (Greek: Ιερός Καθεδρικός Ναός Ευαγγελισμού της Θεοτόκου Αλεξάνδρειας, romanized: Ieros Kathedrikos Naos Evangelismou tis Theotokou Alexandrias) also known as The Cathedral of the Annunciation or The Cathedral of Evangelismos is a trilateral basilica which was founded in the middle of the 19th century in Alexandria, Egypt. Its ecclesiastical see is the Patriarchate of Alexandria and All Africa. The Holy Cathedral serves the Greek community of Alexandria. In the opinion of author Donald M. Reid, the cathedral was built in "neo-Gothic rather than neo-Byzantine style". The cathedral is located in the neighborhood of Tahrir Square, Alexandria.

The cornerstone of the cathedral was laid by Patriarch Hierotheus II on 16 November 1847. Completion of the work took nine years, which was officially marked on 25 March 1856 with a liturgy celebrated by Patriarch Hierotheus.

Restoration work was completed in December 2004 with funding from the Alexander S. Onassis Foundation. The church was rededicated on 2 April 2006 by the Ecumenical Patriarch Bartholomewͺ and the Patriarch of Alexandria and All Africa, Theodore II, in the presence of the President of the Hellenic Republic, Karolos Papoulias.

The church has a length of 41.80 metres, a width of 23.6 metres, and a height of 32.4 metres. The total area is 1,1155.23 square metres. The architect who conceived the church was Ermetes Pierotis; it was completed under Lukowitz. The marble iconostasis, patriarchal throne, the sedilia and the ambo were all works by the Constantinopolitan Iakovos Varoutis. For the design of the doors, windows, pews, baldachin and other sculpture the work was done by George Philippides. The gilder of the iconostasis, the throne and the ambo was Michael Larozas. The gilders of the nave were the brothers Iordanou. The icons were produced both in Egypt and in Constantinople, the windows in Paris, the clock came from London (produced by Frederick Dent, of the same family responsible for London's Big Ben), and the chandeliers came from Russia.

== Gallery ==
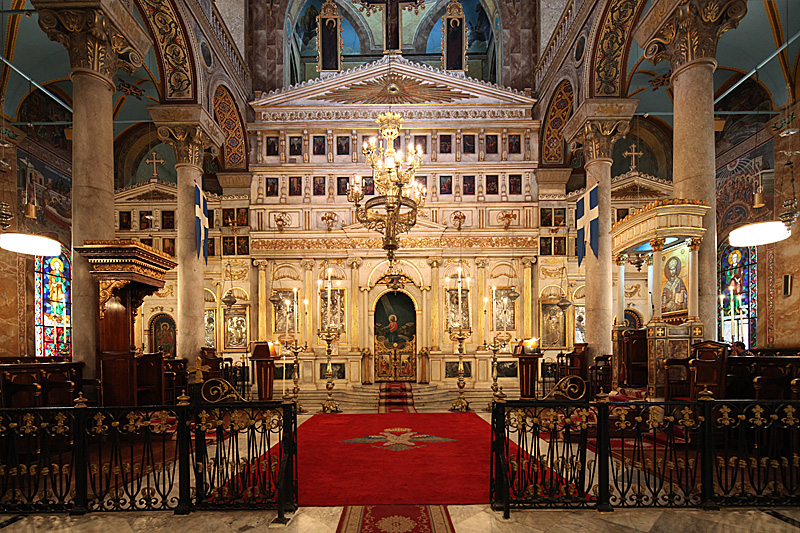

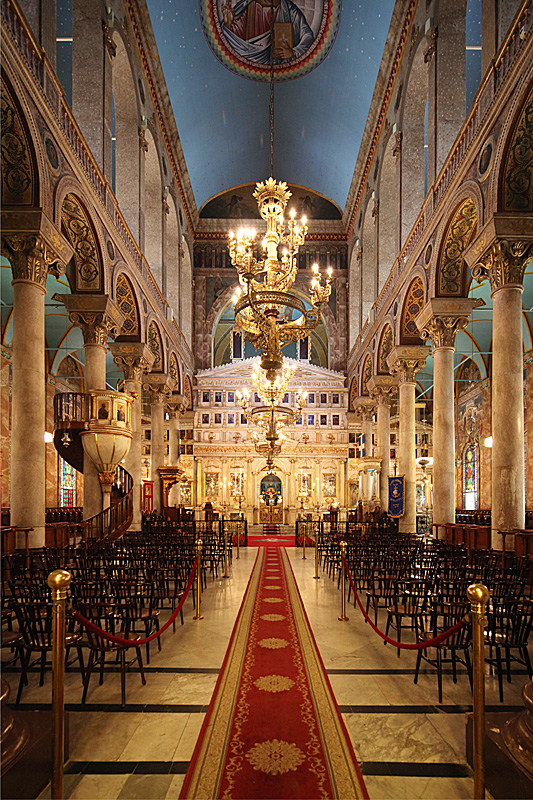

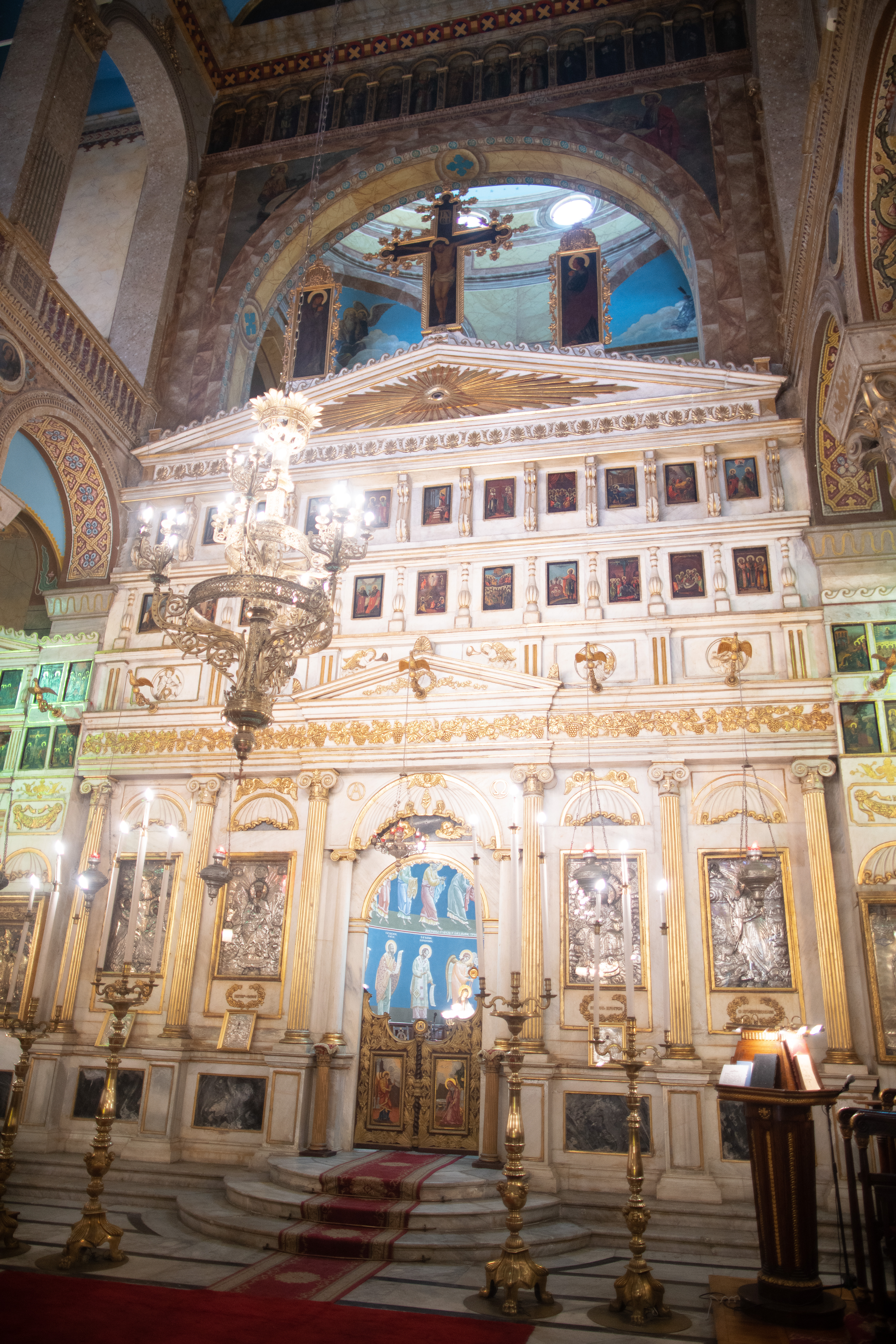

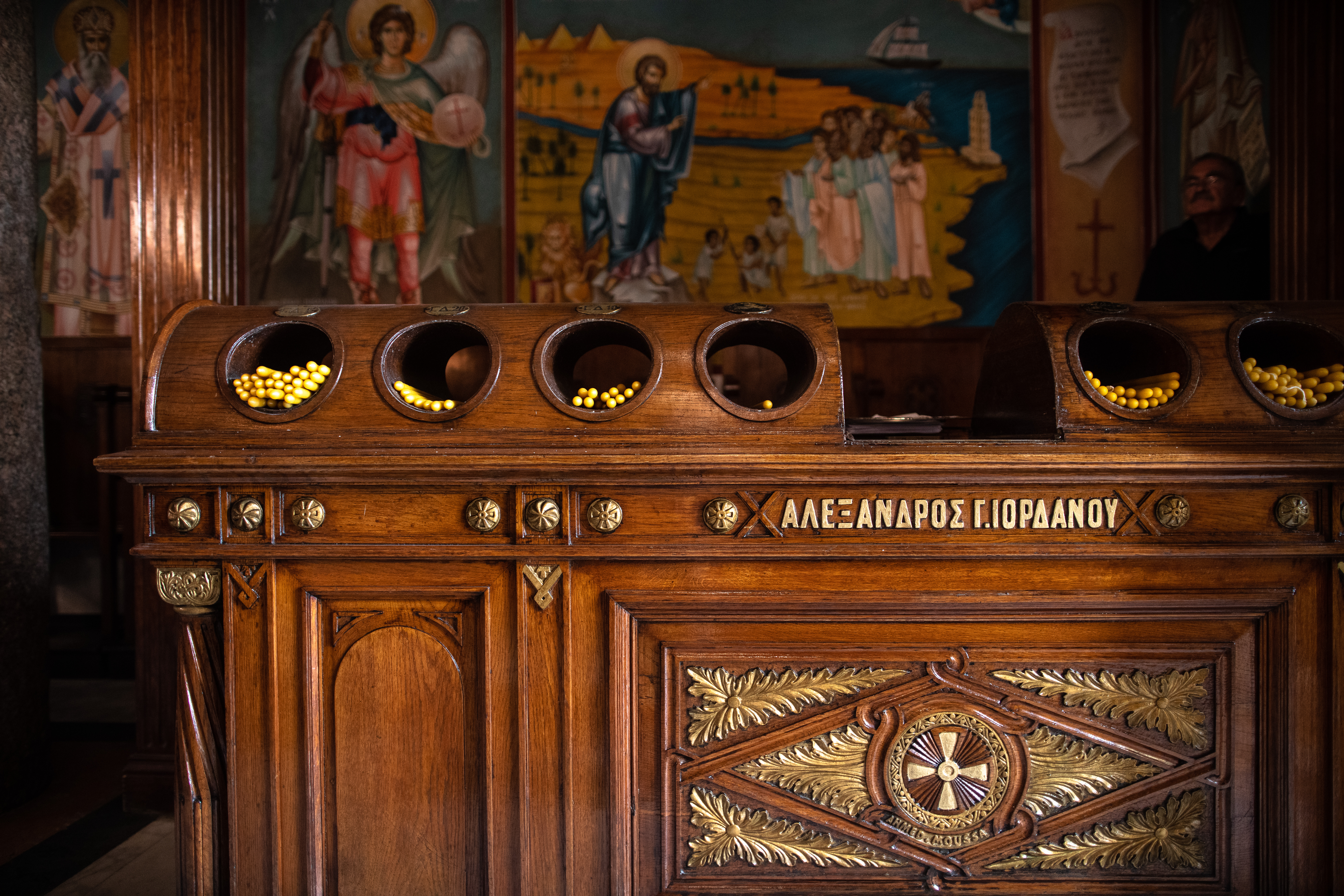
