= Patriarch Eleutherius of Alexandria =

Greek Patriarch of Alexandria, 1175–1180

Eleutherius served as Greek Patriarch of Alexandria between 1175 and 1180.

| Preceded by Elias II | Greek Patriarch of Alexandria; 1175–1180 | Succeeded by Mark III |
