= Christodoulos (Greek patriarch of Alexandria) =

10th-century Greek Patriarch of Alexandria

Christodoulos served as Greek Patriarch of Alexandria between 907 and 932.

| Preceded by Michael II | Greek Patriarch of Alexandria; 907–932 | Succeeded by Eutychius |
