= Aleksei Gerasimov =

Aleksei or Alexey Gerasimov (Russian: Алексей Герасимов) may refer to:

- Aleksei Gerasimov (footballer, born 1973) (Aleksei Vladimirovich Gerasimov), Russian footballer
- Aleksei Gerasimov (footballer, born 1993) (Aleksei Alekseyevich Gerasimov), Russian footballer
- Aleksei Gerasimov (footballer, born 1999) (Aleksei Nikolayevich Gerasimov), Russian footballer
- DaFuq!?Boom!, also known as Alexey Gerasimov, the creator of the web-series Skibidi Toilet
