= Hierotheus I of Alexandria =

Greek Orthodox Patriarch of Alexandria from 1825 to 1845

Hierotheus I of Alexandria (Greek: Αλεξανδρείας Ιερόθεος Α΄) served as Greek Orthodox Patriarch of Alexandria between 1825 and 1845.

Hierotheus I was an Aromanian. He was from Klinovos (now Kleino; Aromanian: Clinova).

Preceded by Theophilus III	Greek Orthodox Patriarch of Alexandria; 1825–1845	Succeeded by Artemius
