= Onopes =

7th-8th century Greek Patriarch of Alexandria

"Onopes" or "Onopsus" was a clergyman in Alexandria. Per Venance Grumel (1958) Onopes was ordained as the Melkite Patriarch of Alexandria around 711, but that shortly thereafter he became a Monophysite. Per Krzysztof Kościelniak (2022) the Melkite Patriarchy of Alexandria was sede vacante for various decades from the mid-7th century, but he notes that Onopes is mentioned in some listings of the Melkite Patriarchs of Alexandria and that he would have been elected to the role but immediately converted to Monophysitism.

Per Leslie S.B. MacCoull (1993) the name Onopes was clearly a nick-name, and that the individual is mentioned in Berlin Papyrus 10677 (the Paschal Letter of Alexander II, Patriarch of Alexandria) as having been an Alexandrian deacon. The letter condemn Onopes as a heretic, who tried to bribe the Muslim governor to make him patriarch, but when this move provoked a popular uprising he fled to Alexander and was received into the latter's communion. Per the writings of 10th century Coptic historian Severus ibn al-Muqaffa, History of the Patriarchs of Alexandria, Onopes was a native physician in Alexandria, who during the reign of Al-Walid ibn Abd al-Malik ibn Marwan had begun to gain influence in the area and had pleaded to the Emir to pressure Theodore to appoint him patriarch. Severus ibn al-Muqaffa denounces Onopes for being "a Roman, and a blasphemous Chalcedonian" and that the Emir had been bribed to accept Onopes becoming named patriarch. Furthermore Severus ibn al-Muqaffa argued that Onopes' name meant 'face of ass'.

Preceded by Theophylactus	Greek Patriarch of Alexandria; 7th century	Vacant Muslim conquest of Egypt Title next held by Cosmas I
