= Cyprian of Alexandria =

Greek Patriarch of Alexandria from 1766 to 1783

Cyprian, formerly a Cypriot deacon, served as Greek Orthodox Patriarch of Alexandria between 1766 and 1783.

Preceded by Matthew	Greek Orthodox Patriarch of Alexandria; 1766–1783	Succeeded by Gerasimus III
