= Gerasim =

Gerasim (Russian Герасим; IPA: [ɡʲɪˈrasʲɪm]) is a male given name, derived from Greek γεράσιμος (cf. Gerasimos), meaning "Respectable", "Honorable Elder".

== First name ==
- Gerasim Izmailov, Russian navigator
- Gerasim - deaf and mute serf, a character in Ivan Turgenev's short story Mumu
- Gerasim Khugayev (born 1945), Ossetian politician
- Gerasim Lebedev (1749 – 1817), Russian adventurer, linguist
- Gerasim Pileš (1913 - 2003), a Soviet Chuvash writer playwright, sculptor, painter.
- Gerasim I, Serbian Patriarch, Archbishop of Peć and Serbian Patriarch (1574-1586)
- Gerasim Zakov (born 1984), Bulgarian footballer
- Gerasim Zelić (1752 – 1828), a Serbian Orthodox Church archimandrite, traveller and writer
- Gerasim Petronović (1820-1906), Serbian Orthodox Bishop of Bay of Kotor and writer
- Gjerasim Qiriazi (Gerasim Kyrias) (1858 – 1894), an Albanian Protestant preacher and educator.

== Related surnames ==
- Gerasimov

== See also ==
- Gerasimos (disambiguation)
