= Eutychius of Alexandria =

Greek Patriarch of Alexandria, 933–940

- Church: Greek Orthodox Patriarchate of Alexandria
- Installed: 933
- Term ended: 940
- Predecessor: Christodoulus
- Successor: Sophronius II

Personal details
- Born: September 10, 876 Fustat, Egypt
- Died: May 11, 940

Eutychius of Alexandria (Arabic: Sa'id ibn Batriq or Bitriq; 10 September 877 – 12 May 940) was the Melkite Patriarch of Alexandria. He is known for being one of the first Christian Egyptian writers to use the Arabic language. His writings include the chronicle Nazm al-Jawhar ("Row of Jewels"), also known by its Latin title Eutychii Annales ("The Annals of Eutychius").

== Life ==
Eutychius was born in Fustat (old Cairo). Eutychius spent much of his life as a medical practitioner (mutatabbib). His life was roughly contemporary with the historian Agapius of Hierapolis, although neither displays knowledge of the other.

He did not know Greek, but was able to access Greek texts in existing Syriac translations.

In 932 he became the Melkite Patriarch of Alexandria at the age of 60. Because he had never held any clerical office, his appointment met with considerable opposition, which lasted the remainder of his life. His appointment was probably due to the influence of the Muslim rulers.

== Works ==
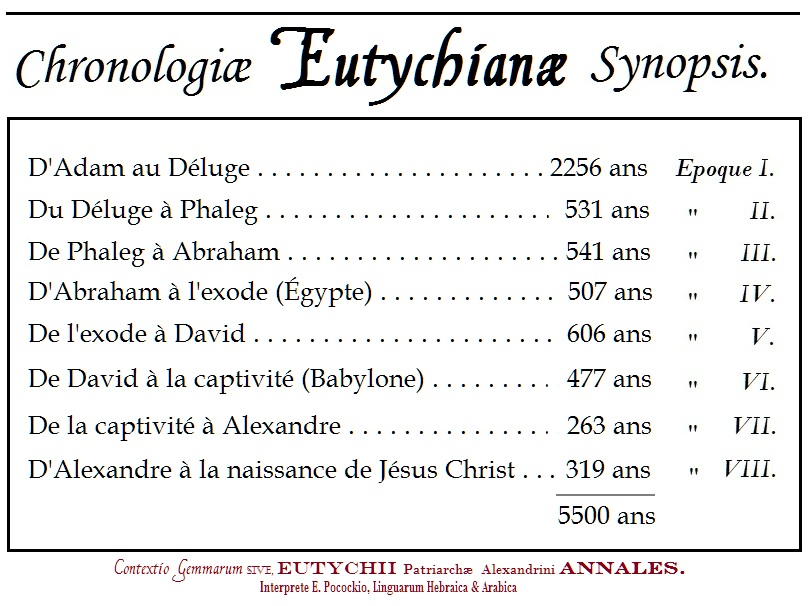
Eutychius' chronicle (in French)

The most important work is the Nazm al-Jauhar, a world chronicle, which he began before becoming Patriarch, and dedicated to his brother. It begins with the Creation, and runs down to his own times. His Nazm al-Jauhar is a valuable source for events in Persia prior to the rise of Islam and the later Sassanid rulers. For events after the rise of Islam, Eutychius makes use of Muslim sources. He also drew on legendary and hagiographical material.

Eutychii Annales: CHAPTER II: ADVERSITIES OF THE CHURCH.: 1 Persecutions of the Christians.: ...The Christians suffered less in this than in the preceding centuries. ...In the East especially in Syria and Palestine the Jews sometimes rose upon the Christians with great violence (Eutychius, Annales tom ii., p. 236, &c. Jo. Henr. Hottinger, Historia Orientalis, lib. i., c. id., p. 129, &c.) yet so unsuccessfully as to suffer severely for their temerity. ( Mosheim 1847, p. 426, at Google Books)

The history was adapted and continued to 1028 by Yahya ibn Sa'id, in which form it became known in Antioch and then Europe; but it continued to be expanded, and to circulate in this modified form. Numerous copies were made. However the autograph was recently located at Mount Sinai (Sinaiticus Arabicus 582). The start and end of the manuscript are missing, but can be reconstructed from copies.

Other works are a book on medicine and an apologetic work. A manuscript of the former has been located in Aleppo, although not published. The latter text has not been found as yet.

== Bibliography ==
- M. Breydy, Études sur Said ibn Batriq et ses sources, Corpus Scriptorum Christianorum Orientalium 450, Louvain, 1983.
- M. Breydy, Das Annalenwerk des Eutychios von Alexandrien; ausgewählte Geschichten und Legenden kompiliert von Said ibn Batriq um 935 AD, Corpus Scriptorum Christianorum Orientalium 471–72, 2 vols., Louvain, (1985). Arabic text, German translation. The first edition based on the author's autograph manuscript.
- P. Cachia and W. M. Watt, Eutychius of Alexandria: The Book of the Demonstration (Kitab al-burhan), Corpus Scriptorum Christianorum Orientalium 192-93 (Scriptores arabici 20, 23), 2 vols., Louvain, 1960–61. Arabic text, English translation; an apologetic text not in fact by Eutychius.
- L. Cheikho, B. Carra de Vaux, and H. Zayyat, Eutychii Patriarchae Alexandrini Annales, Corpus Scriptorum Christianorum Orientalium 50-51 (Scriptores Arabici ser. 3 nos. 6-7), 2 vols., Paris, 1906–9. Arabic text only, based on inferior copies.
- G. Graf, Geschichte der arabischen christlichen Literatur, volume 2. Article on Eutychius, and lists of editions and manuscripts of his works.
- B. Pirone, Eutichio, Patriarcha di Alessandria: Gli Annali, Studia Orientalia Christiana Monographiae 1, Cairo and Jerusalem, 1987. Italian translation, no Arabic text.
- John Selden and Edward Pococke, Contextia Gemmarum sive Eutychii Patriarchae Alexandrini Annales, 2 vols., Oxford, 1658–59. Arabic text, Latin translation. The Latin translation was reprinted by Migne in the Patrologia Graeca vol. 111, cols. 889–1232.

Preceded by Christodoulos	Greek Patriarch of Alexandria; 933—940	Succeeded by Sophronius II
