= Encyclical of the Eastern Patriarchs =

Letter to all Eastern Orthodox Christians from four Eastern patriarchs in 1848

The Encyclical of the Eastern Patriarchs is a letter issued in May 1848 by the four Eastern patriarchs of the Eastern Orthodox Church, who met at Council in Constantinople. It was addressed to all Eastern Orthodox Christians, as a response against Pope Pius IX's letter In Suprema Petri Apostoli Sede ("Epistle to the Easterners"), which had been issued in January that year.

The encyclical was solemnly addressed to "All the Bishops Everywhere, Beloved in the Holy Ghost, Our Venerable, Most Dear Brethren; and to their Most Pious Clergy; and to All the Genuine Orthodox Sons of the One, Holy, Catholic, and Apostolic Church". The encyclical explicitly denounces the Filioque clause added by Rome to the Nicene Creed as a heresy, censures the papacy for missionizing among Eastern Orthodox Christians, and repudiates Ultramontanism (papal supremacy). It also describes the Roman Catholic Church as being in apostasy, heresy, and schism.

In the course of all this, it notably makes reference to the Fourth Council of Constantinople (879-880) as being the eighth ecumenical council.

== Signatories ==
Patriarchal Signatories of the Encyclical

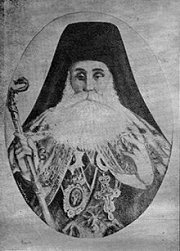
Anthimus VI of Constantinople

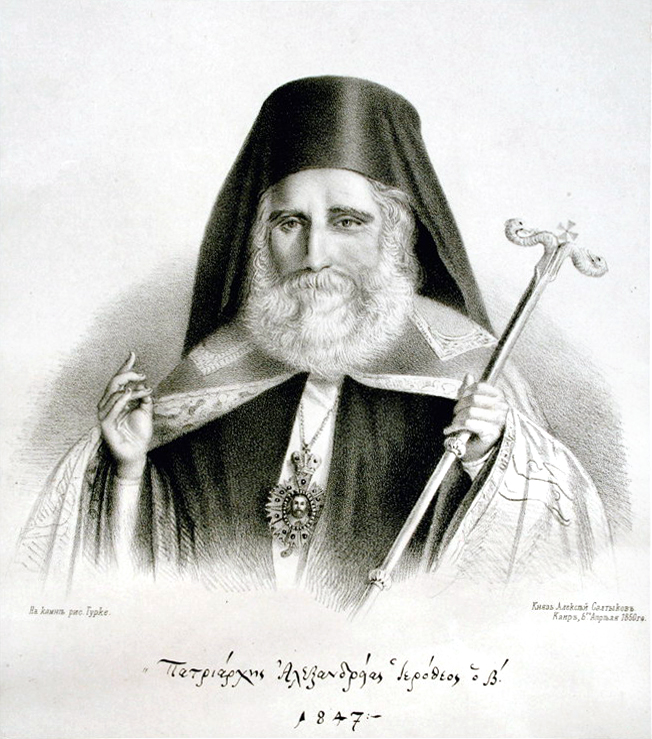
Hierotheus II of Alexandria

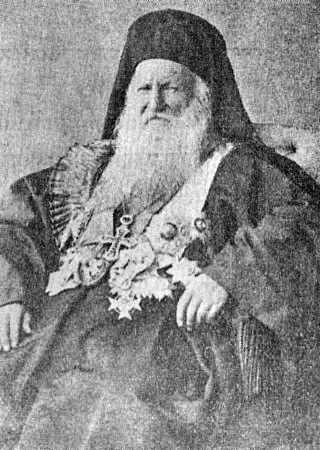
Patriarch Cyril II of Jerusalem

Four Patriarchs signed the encyclical, three of whom are depicted here. Methodius of Antioch, who is not shown here, also signed.
- Patriarch Anthimus VI of Constantinople
- Pope and Patriarch Hierotheus II of Alexandria
- Patriarch Methodius of Antioch
- Patriarch Cyril II of Jerusalem
- The Holy Synod in Constantinople
- The Holy Synod in Antioch
- The Holy Synod in Jerusalem

== See also ==
- Eastern Orthodoxy
- Theological differences between the Catholic Church and the Eastern Orthodox Church
- Ecclesiastical differences between the Catholic Church and the Eastern Orthodox Church
