= Theophilus III of Alexandria =

Greek Patriarch of Alexandria from 1805 to 1825

Theophilus III or Pope Theophilus Pankostas (Greek: Θεόφιλος Παγκώστας; Patmos, 1764 – Patmos , 24 January 1833), was Pope and Greek Orthodox Patriarch of Alexandria and All Africa between 1805 and 1825.

He was a native of Patmos and the grandson of Patriarch Parthenios II, whom he succeeded on the throne of Alexandria. He supported the immigration of Greeks to Egypt, with the approval of the reformer Mohammed Ali. In 1818 he fell ill and retired to the island of Patmos to recover; there he was initiated into the Filikí Eteria. With the arrival of the Greek revolution, Theophilos returned to Patmos and remained there for the duration of the conflicts in the nation. On 14 October 1825 the Ecumenical Patriarch Chrysantos, under pressure from the Ottoman government, convened a synod in Constantinople and suspended Theophilos from office for his long absence from the patriarchal see. Theophilos died in Patmos on 24 January 1833.

Preceded by Parthenius II	Greek Orthodox Patriarch of Alexandria; 1805–1825	Succeeded by Hierotheus I
