= Patriarch Nicanor of Alexandria =

Greek Patriarch of Alexandria from 1866 to 1869

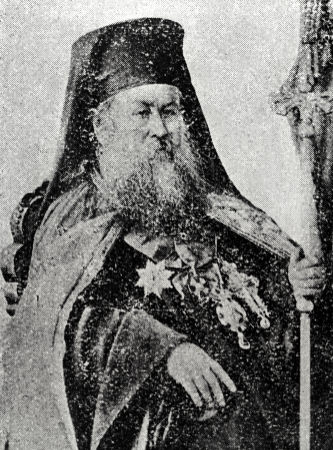
Patriarch Nicanor of Alexandria.

Nicanor (c. 1800 – 25 December 1869) served as Greek Patriarch of Alexandria from 1866 to his death in 1869.

| Preceded by Jacob | Greek Patriarch of Alexandria; 1866–1869 | Succeeded by Nilus |
