= Patriarch Sabbas of Alexandria =

12th-century Greek Patriarch of Alexandria

Sabbas served as Greek Patriarch of Alexandria in the 12th century (exact dates are unknown).

Preceded by Eulogius II	Greek Patriarch of Alexandria; 12th century	Succeeded by Cyril II
