= Patriarch Paisius of Alexandria =

Greek Orthodox patriarch and scholar

Paisius Ligarides (Παΐσιος Λιγαρίδης), born Pantaleon Ligarides (Παντολέων Λιγαρίδης; Latinized Ligaridus; c. 1610 – 1678) was a Greek Orthodox scholar, Metropolitan of Gaza.

Born in Chios, he taught literature and theology in the Greek college in Rome established in 1577 by Pope Gregory XIII. He was at first supportive of reconciliation of Orthodox with Catholic theology, but later returned to Greek Orthodoxy and wrote against both Catholicism and Calvinism. Leaving Rome, he went to Constantinople, and later (1646) to Târgoviște in Wallachia where he established (or revived) a Greek school. In 1651 he travelled to Palestine in the company of Patriarch Paisius I of Jerusalem, taking monastic vows and adopting the monastic name of Paisius. In 1652, he received the titular office of Metropolitan of Gaza from Paisius.

In 1655, he wrote a very long Chrismology [Chrismologion] of Constantinople, the New Rome, the first comprehensive collection of the mass of Greek oracular and prophetic produced in reference to the Fall of Constantinople .

In 1657 He was appointed the Greek Orthodox Patriarch of Alerxandria.

In 1665, the Patriarch of Constantinople Parthenios IV deposed him from his throne, citing his many years of absence from Egypt, but the decision was not accepted by the flock and with the help of Russian diplomacy he was reinstated.

As Patriarch, he went to Moscow at the invitation of Tsar Alexis. He appointed him as head of the Great Moscow Synod of 1666, which condemned the Patriarch of Moscow Nikon for dereliction of duty. He stayed in Russia for years and secured significant financial aid for the Patriarchate of Alexandria from the Tsar. After 1666, he wrote an account of the Synod's condemnation of Patriarch Nikon of Moscow in the form of a polemical essay in support of the absolute authority of the Russian Tsar in theological matters. He was known as a trader of indulgences, which he sold in Russia.

In 1678, he abdicated the Patriarchal Throne due to his advanced age. He was succeeded by Parthenius I of Alexandria.

== Bibliography ==
- Constantine Sathas, Νεοελληνική Φιλολογία: Βιογραφία των εν τοις γράμμασι διαλαμψάντων Ελλήνων (1453-1821) Athens (1868), 814–816.
- Andronikos Dimitrakopoulos, Ορθόδοξος Ελλάς (1872), 161f.
- "Paisios (1657–1677)". Official web site of the Greek Orthodox Patriarchate of Alexandria and All Africa.
- V. Grumel, "Ligaridès, Paisios" in: Dictionnaire de Theologie Catholique, Paris (1930–1950) vol. IX, 749–757.
- Gerhard Podskalsky, Griechische Theologie in der Zeit der Türkenherrschaft (1453-1821) (1988), 251ff.
- Harry T. Hionides, Paisius Ligarides (1972).

Preceded by Joannicius	Greek Patriarch of Alexandria; 1657–1678	Succeeded by Parthenius I
