= Eulogius II of Alexandria =

Greek Patriarch of Alexandria in the 12th century

Eulogius II served as Greek Patriarch of Alexandria in the 12th century from approximately 1110 to 1117 (exact dates are unknown).

Preceded by John VI	Greek Patriarch of Alexandria; 12th century	Succeeded by Sabbas
