= Patriarch Job of Alexandria =

Greek Patriarch of Alexandria, 954–960

Job served as Melkite Greek Patriarch of Alexandria between 954 and 960.

Preceded by Isaac	Greek Patriarch of Alexandria; 954–960	Succeeded by Elias I
