= Patriarch Niphon of Alexandria =

Greek Patriarch of Alexandria, 1366–1385

Niphon served as Greek Patriarch of Alexandria between 1366 and 1385.

Preceded by Gregory III	Greek Patriarch of Alexandria; 1366–1385	Succeeded by Mark IV
