= Patriarch Metrophanes of Alexandria =

Greek Patriarch of Alexandria from 1636 to 1639

Metrophanes Μητροφάνης
- Pope and Patriarch of Alexandria and all Africa
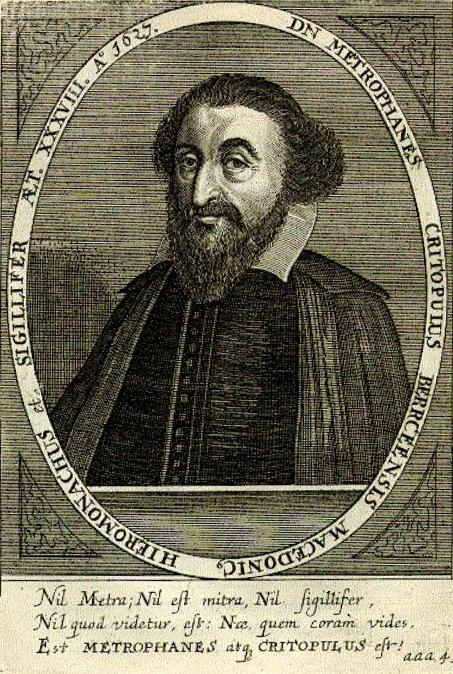
- Metrophanes Kritopoulos
- Church: Eastern Orthodox Church
- See: Alexandria
- Installed: 1636
- Term ended: 1639
- Predecessor: Gerasimus Ι
- Successor: Nicephorus

Personal details
- Born: Metrophanes Kritopoulos c. 1589 Veria, Ottoman Empire
- Died: 30 May 1639 Wallachia, Ottoman Empire
- Occupation: Theology, Greek literature, and philosophy

Metrophanes Kritopoulos, sometimes Critopoulos, Critopoulus, Kritopulus (Greek: Μητροφάνης Κριτόπουλος, c. 1589 – 30 May 1639) was a Greek monk and theologian who served as Greek Patriarch of Alexandria between 1636 and 1639.

== Biography ==
Metrophanes Kritopoulos was a Greek born in Veria, Macedonia in 1589. Originally a monk on Mount Athos, he was a close associate of Cyril Lucaris. He studied at the University of Oxford in England (1617–24, funded by James I) and in Germany. He travelled to Europe and mingled with the greatest scholars and theologians of his day. He made Orthodoxy known in the West and was particularly concerned with the problem of unifying the Orthodox Church with the churches of Western Europe. He taught Greek in Vienna (1627–30). After a period as bishop of Memphis in Egypt, he was elected patriarch of Alexandria on 1636, where he put together an important library.

He died in Wallachia in 1639.

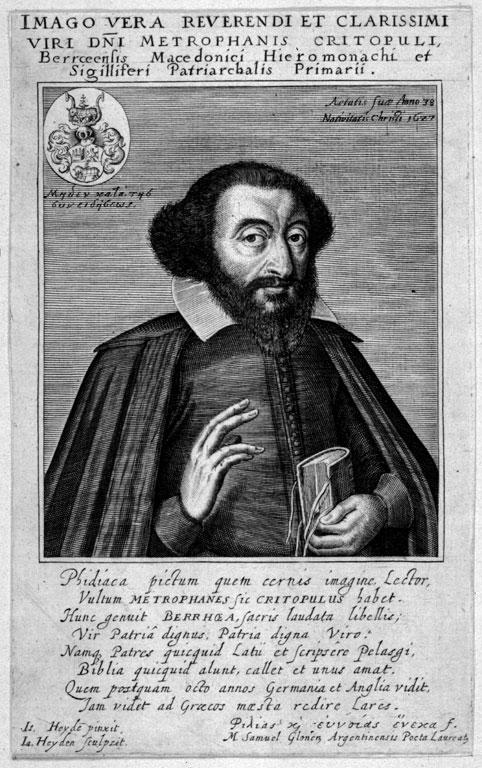
Metrophanes Kritopoulos in 1627

== See also ==
- List of Macedonians (Greek)

Eastern Orthodox Church titles
Preceded by Gerasimus I	Greek Patriarch of Alexandria; 1636–1639	Succeeded by Nicephorus
