= Patriarch Jacob of Alexandria =

Greek Patriarch of Alexandria from 1861 to 1865

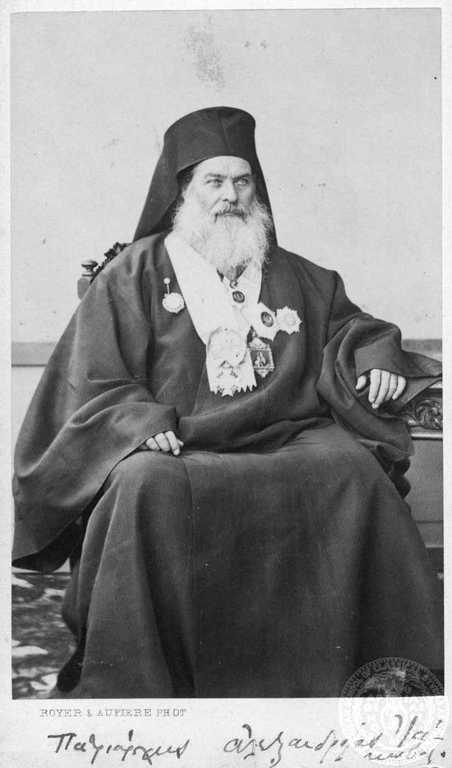
Jacob of Alexandria, 19 April 1863

Jacob (Greek: Ιάκωβος) served as Greek Patriarch of Alexandria between 1861 and 1865.

Preceded by Callinicus	Greek Patriarch of Alexandria; 1861–1865	Succeeded by Nicanor
