= Parthenius I of Alexandria =

Greek Patriarch of Alexandria from 1678 to 1688

Parthenius I served as Greek Orthodox Patriarch of Alexandria between 1678 and 1688. Prior to being the Patriarch, he served as Metropolitan of Nazareth. He suffered a serious injury in an earthquake in 1688 and died later that year in Smyrna, in Asia Minor.

Preceded by Paisius	Greek Orthodox Patriarch of Alexandria; 1678–1688	Succeeded by Gerasimus II
