= Patriarch Isaac of Alexandria =

Greek Patriarch of Alexandria in 941–954

Isaac served as Greek Patriarch of Alexandria between 941 and 954.

Preceded by Sophronius II	Greek Patriarch of Alexandria; 941–954	Succeeded by Job
