= Callinicus of Alexandria =

Greek Patriarch of Alexandria from 1858 to 1861

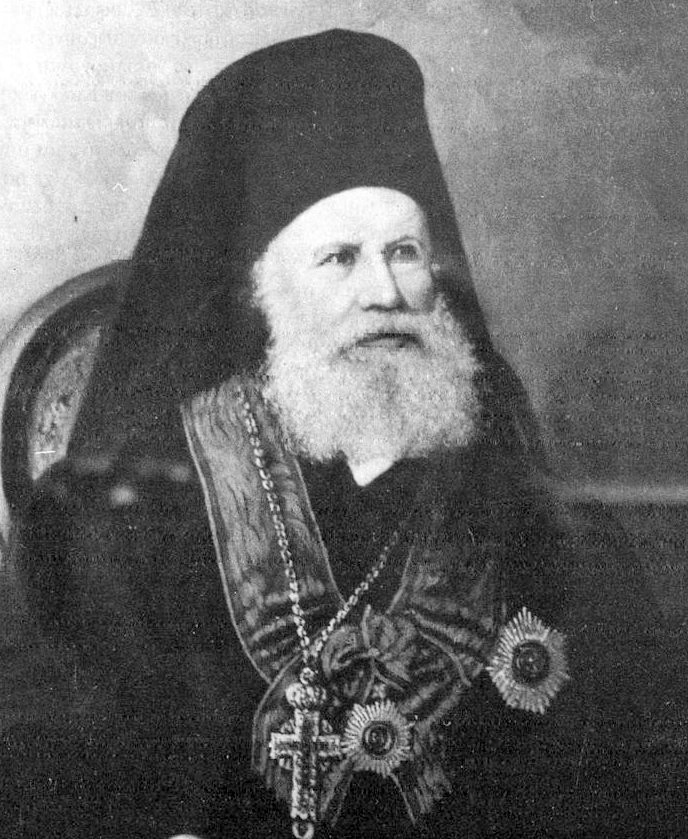
Patriarch Callinicus of Alexandria.

Callinicus (Greek: Καλλίνικος; born Konstantinos Kyparissis; 1800 – 12 July 1889) served as the Greek Orthodox Patriarch of Alexandria from 14 March 1858 until his resignation on 24 May 1861. He was born in Skotina, Pieria in 1800. Callinicus died in Mytilene on 12 July 1889.

Preceded by Hierotheus II	Greek Orthodox Patriarch of Alexandria; 1858–1861	Succeeded by Jacob
