= Gerasimov Merchant Shop =

- Лавка купца Герасимова
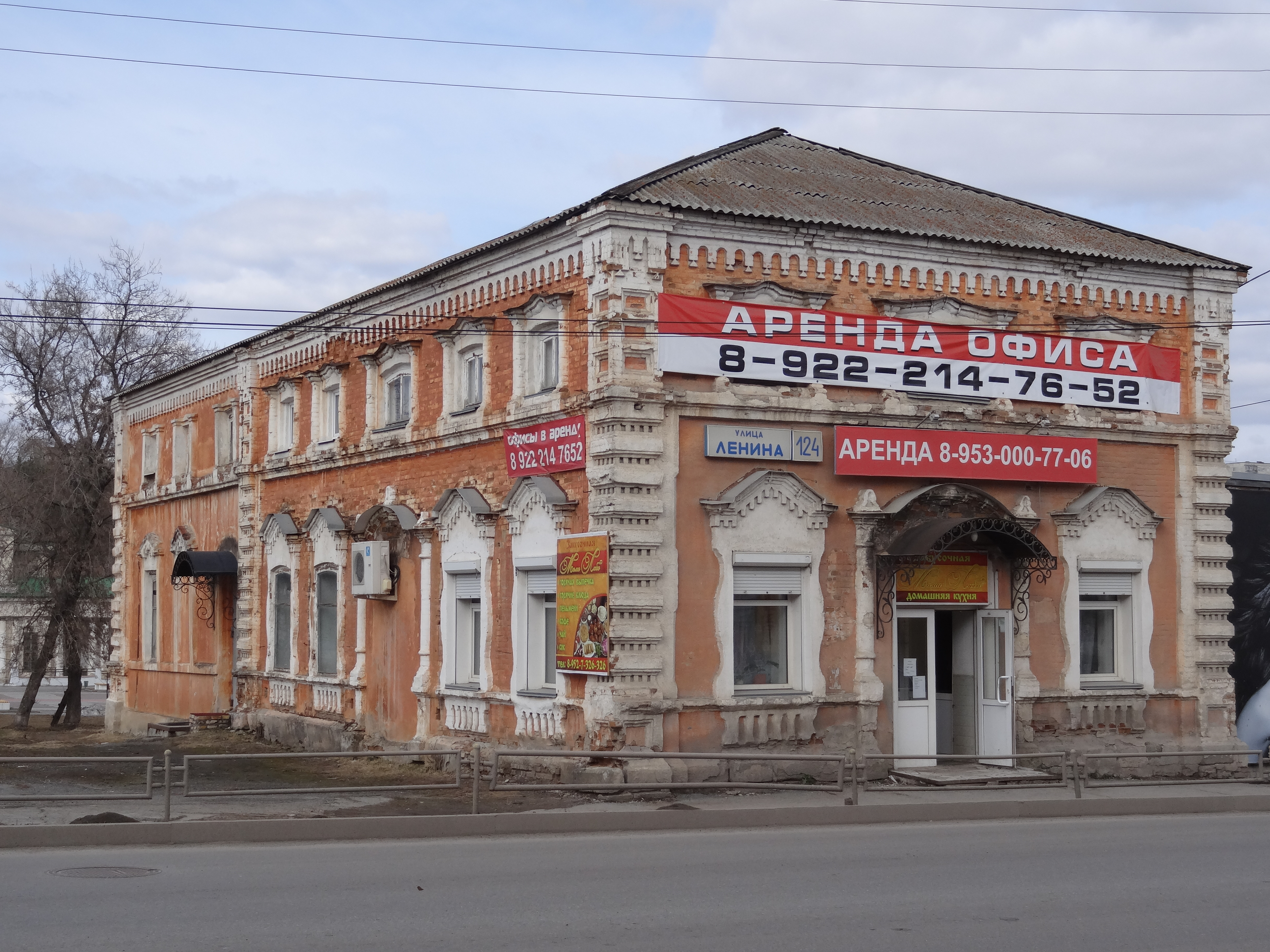
- Interactive map of the Gerasimov Merchant Shop area

General information
- Architectural style: Eclecticism
- Location: Kamensk-Uralsky
- Coordinates: 56°25′02″N 61°53′38″E
- Completed: the 19th century

Gerasimov Merchant Shop is an architectural monument in Kamensk-Uralsky, Sverdlovsk oblast.

The building was granted the status of regional significance on 31 December 1987 (decision No. 535 by the executive committee of Sverdlovsk oblast Council of People's Deputies). The object number of cultural heritage of regional significance is 661710794040005.

== Architecture ==
The building was built in the second half of the 19th century. It located in the historic center of the town on Lenin Street. The first owner was a Kamensk merchant Gerasimov. The shop was on the first floor. And the second floor was Gerasimov's apartments.

The main southern facade faces Lenin Street. The building area is shaped like a rectangle, stretching from north to south. The lower part of the monument is vertically stretched. The brick building bases on quarried stone foundation. Rooms were made with wooden joists. The building with inclined and slate roof.

The house composition is simple, symmetrical and a little stretched. The wide doorway emphasizes the central part of the building. It's a main entrance. Massive architraves and brick semi-columns are used in the decoration. On either side of the doorway are jack-arch windows. Above the main entrance the window with figured architraves stands out. Also there used semi-columns. The corners of the building are set of bossage.

Rooms were divided into areas: two columns right in the center of the trading floor; in the north part of the building was a staircase to the second floor and housekeeping area.

The original interior decorations were lost.

== Literature ==
- Свод памятников истории и культуры Свердловской области. Vol. 2. Екатеринбург: Сократ. 2008. p. 648. ISBN 978-5-88664-323-7.
- Памятники архитектуры Каменска-Уральского / С. И. Гаврилова, Л. В. Зенкова, А. В. Кузнецова, А. Ю. Лесунова — Екатеринбург: Банк культурной информации, 2008. — 92 с.
