= Patriarch George II of Alexandria =

Greek Patriarch of Alexandria, 1021–1051

George II served as Greek Patriarch of Alexandria between 1021 and 1052.

| Preceded by Theophilus II | Greek Patriarch of Alexandria; 1021–1052 | Succeeded by Leontius |
