= In Suprema Petri Apostoli Sede =

Document by Pope Pius IX

In Suprema Petri Apostoli Sede Latin for 'In the Supreme See of the Apostle Peter' Encyclical of Pope Pius IX
- Signature date: 6 January 1848
- Subject: An invitation to Eastern Orthodox to return into full communion with the Holy See
- Number: 4 of 41 of the pontificate

In Suprema Petri Apostoli Sede (On the Supreme See of Peter the Apostle), also titled Litterae ad Orientales, i.e. Epistle to the Easterners, is a document – considered as either an apostolic letter or as an encyclical letter – sent by Pope Pius IX in 1848 to the Eastern Catholic Churches and to the bishops and clergy of the Eastern Orthodox Churches, urging the latter to enter into communion with the Roman Catholic Church.

The document was answered the same year by several leading members of the Eastern Orthodox Church, in the Encyclical of the Eastern Patriarchs, which restated the theological controversies between the two Churches.

== Evaluation ==
In his volume about the early years of the papacy of Pius IX, Giacomo Martina writes that:

The only, partially positive, result was the development of a lively controversy between the Orthodox and the Romans, which, although in a tone of little fraternity, offered the more enlightened spirits a stimulus to a better knowledge of the points of view of the two sides.

== See also ==
- Allatae sunt
- Rerum orientalium
- Omnem sollicitudinem
- Iam Vos Omnes
- Arcano divinae
- Unitatis christianae
- Grande munus
- Praeclara gratulationis publicae
- Orientalium dignitas
- Ecclesiastical differences between the Catholic Church and the Eastern Orthodox Church
