= Patriarch Athanasius IV of Alexandria =

Greek Patriarch of Alexandria, 1417–1425

Athanasius IV served as Greek Patriarch of Alexandria between 1417 and 1425.

Preceded by Nicholas IV	Greek Patriarch of Alexandria; 1417–1425	Succeeded by Mark V
