= Theophilus II (Greek patriarch of Alexandria) =

Greek Patriarch of Alexandria in 1010–1020

Theophilus served as Greek Patriarch of Alexandria between 1010 and 1020, during the persecution of the Christians under the Fatimid caliph al-Hakim.

Preceded by Arsenius	Greek Patriarch of Alexandria; 1010–1020	Succeeded by George II
