= Patriarch John VI of Alexandria =

Greek Patriarch of Alexandria in 1062–1100

John VI served as Greek Patriarch of Alexandria between 1062 and 1100.

Preceded by Alexander II	Greek Patriarch of Alexandria; 1062–1100	Succeeded by Eulogius II
