= Sergey Gerasimov =

Sergey Gerasimov may refer to:

- Sergey Vasilyevich Gerasimov (1885–1964), Russian painter
- Sergei Gerasimov (film director) (1906–1985), Russian actor, film director and screenwriter
- Sergei Gerasimov (swimmer), Russian gold medalist in swimming at the 2003 Summer Universiade
- Sergey Gerasimovich Mitin, politician
- Sergey Gerasimovich Mikaelyan, film director
