= Gherasim =

Gherasim is a Romanian male given name and surname that may refer to:

- Gherasim Luca
- Gherasim Rudi
- Gherasim Safirin
- Alina Gherasim, Romanian runner
- Arcadie Gherasim
- Daniel Gherasim, Romanian footballer
