= Pope Matthew III of Alexandria =

Head of the Coptic Church from 1361 to 1646

- Pope of Alexandria and Patriarch of the See of St. Mark
- Papacy began: 7 September 1631 2 Pi Kogi Enavot 1347
- Papacy ended: 31 March 1646 22 Paremhat 1362
- Predecessor: John XV
- Successor: Mark VI

Personal details
- Born: Tadros Toukh El-Nasarah, El-Monufia, Egypt
- Died: 31 March 1646 22 Paremhat 1362 Egypt
- Buried: Church in Toukh El-Nasarah
- Denomination: Coptic Orthodox Christian
- Residence: Church of the Virgin Mary (Haret Zuweila)

Pope Matthew III of Alexandria (Abba Matta III; died 31 March 1646) was the 100th Pope of Alexandria and Patriarch of the See of St. Mark. His papacy was during the time when Egypt was part of the Ottoman Empire and was ruled by consecutive short-term (2–3 years each) representatives of the sultan and the church was under much pressure from the rulers.

After the departure of Pope Youannas XV on 2 Pi Kogi Enavot 1346 A.M. (7 September 1629 A.D.), the Synod of Bishops met with leaders of the Christian people, and thought together about whom to choose, and in consultation together they came to agreement on a monk named "Tadros" from the monastery of St. Macerious. He was born in Tookh Menoufia to Christian parents who taught him fear of God and piety, and gave him a good upbringing. Then he studied in the kotab school in his town (this was the name of "school" in the Middle Ages, attached to either the church or mosque. He studied the Coptic language and the Bible as well as math and science of his time).

As he grew up and learned, his inclinations began to appear in the direction of living of asceticism and austerity and asceticism and abstinence; and so longed to monastic life, so he left his town and went to the monastery of St Macerious in the wilderness of Nitrite following the saying of Christ "he who loves his father or mother more than me is not worthy of me. .. he who does not take his cross and follow me is not worthy of me »(Mt 10: 38.37).

It was said in his biography that he became famous among his peers in the monastery because of supremacy of ethics and gentleness, knowledge and piety and righteousness, so he was promoted to be a priest of the monastery. Due to the severity of his zeal and his goodness and compassion, set up by the monks of the monastery as the, head of the monastery, and was commissioned to degree of "Alaagomans".

== Ordination ==
On Sunday, Pi Kogi Enavot 3, 1347 (Sunday, September 8, 1631), he was ordained as pope "Matthew the third".

Oriental Orthodox titles
Preceded by John XV	Coptic Pope; 1631–1646	Succeeded by Mark VI
