= Patriarch Cyril II of Alexandria =

12th-century Greek Patriarch of Alexandria

Cyril II served as Greek Orthodox Patriarchs of Alexandria in the 12th century (exact dates are unknown).

Preceded by Sabbas	Greek Patriarch of Alexandria; 12th century	Succeeded by Theodosius II
