= Aleksei Gerasimov (footballer, born 1999) =

Russian footballer

Personal information
- Full name: Aleksei Nikolayevich Gerasimov
- Date of birth: 27 June 1999 (age 27)
- Place of birth: Yaroslavl, Russia
- Height: 1.75 m (5 ft 9 in)
- Position: Forward

Senior career*
Years	Team	Apps	(Gls)
2017–2019	FC Shinnik Yaroslavl	8	(0)
2019–2022	FC Znamya Truda Orekhovo-Zuyevo	57	(2)
2022–2023	FC Zorkiy Krasnogorsk	46	(1)
- * Club domestic league appearances and goals as of 12 November 2023

Aleksei Nikolayevich Gerasimov (Russian: Алексей Николаевич Герасимов; born 27 June 1999) is a Russian football player.

== Club career ==
He made his debut in the Russian Football National League for FC Shinnik Yaroslavl on 6 October 2018 in a game against FC Tambov as an added-time substitute for Sergey Samodin.
