= Patriarch Sophronius II of Alexandria =

Greek Patriarch of Alexandria in 941

Sophronius II (Greek: Σωφρόνιος, romanized: Sōphronios) briefly served as Greek Patriarch of Alexandria in 941.

Preceded by Eutychius	Greek Patriarch of Alexandria; 941	Succeeded by Isaac
