= Patriarch Nicephorus of Alexandria =

Greek Patriarch of Alexandria from 1639 to 1645

Nicephorus served as Greek Patriarch of Alexandria between 1639 and 1645.

Eastern Orthodox Church titles
Preceded by Metrophanes	Greek Patriarch of Alexandria; 1639–1645	Succeeded by Joannicius
