= Philotheos (Greek patriarch of Alexandria) =

Greek Patriarch of Alexandria in 1435–1459

His Divine Beatitude Philotheos
- Pope and Patriarch of Alexandria and All Africa
- Church: Greek Orthodox Church of Alexandria
- See: Alexandria
- Installed: 1435
- Term ended: 1459
- Predecessor: Mark V
- Successor: Mark VI

Personal details
- Denomination: Eastern Orthodox Church

Philotheus served as Greek Patriarch of Alexandria between 1435 and 1459.

He participated in the 1443 Council of Jerusalem against the union of Florence.

Preceded by Mark V	Greek Patriarch of Alexandria; 1435–1459	Succeeded by Mark VI
