= Patriarch Elias II of Alexandria =

12th-century Greek Patriarch of Alexandria

Elias II served as Greek Patriarch of Alexandria between 1171 and 1175.

Preceded by Sophronius III	Greek Patriarch of Alexandria; 1171–1175	Succeeded by Eleutherius
