= Gregory V of Cilicia =

Gregory V of Cilicia Գրիգոր Ե. Քարավեժ
- Installed: 1193
- Term ended: 1194
- Predecessor: Gregory IV the Young
- Successor: Gregory VI of Cilicia

Personal details
- Died: 1194

Gregory V of Cilicia (Armenian: Գրիգոր Ե. Քարավեժ) was the Catholicos of the Armenian Apostolic Church from 1193 to 1194.

Upon the death of Catholicos Gregory IV the Young his throne was occupied by his sister's son Vahram, who took the name Gregory V of Cilicia. He was still of a young age and according to the chronicler Smbat Sparapet 'he did not display the same obedience to everyone as previously when he was under a tutor, rather he ruled the patriarchy in a willful manner, as his mother's brother wished'. This caused envy amongst the more senior clergymen and brought many charges against him implying that he was not capable of being Catholicos. They brought these claims to Prince Levon I of Armenia many times until he relented and had Gregory imprisoned in his palace at Hromgla. Word spread of his imprisonment and people attempted to free him to no avail. Catholicos Gregory was moved to the fortress of Kopitar and brought before Prince Levon. The agitated residents of Hromkla secretly sent Gregory word to prepare to escape and convinced the lord of the fortress to free him, but the Catholicos misinterpreted this message and attempted to free himself. He took linen and hung it out to descend from the fortress one night but fell to his death when the rope broke. His body was taken to Drazark where he was buried near the tomb of his uncle Gregory IV.

Preceded by Gregory IV the Young	Catholicos of the Holy See of Cilicia; 1193–1194	Succeeded by Gregory VI of Cilicia
