= Parthenius II of Alexandria =

Greek Patriarch of Alexandria from 1788 to 1805

Parthenius II Pankostas served as Greek Orthodox Patriarch of Alexandria between 1788 and 1805.

| Preceded by Gerasimus III | Greek Orthodox Patriarch of Alexandria; 1788–1805 | Succeeded by Theophilus III |
