= Gregory IV the Young =

- Installed: 1173
- Term ended: 1193
- Predecessor: Nerses IV the Gracious
- Successor: Gregory V of Cilicia

Gregory IV Dgha ("the Child", or "the Young") was the Catholicos of the Armenian Apostolic Church from 1173 to 1193. Despite his nickname, he was around forty when he assumed the role of Catholicos.

When Nerses IV the Gracious died, he attempted to pass the diocese onto the younger of his two nephews, but the older - Gregory - enjoyed the support of Prince Mleh and was thus able to obtain the Catholicos' seat. He continued the policies of his uncles Nerses and Gregory in seeking accommodations with other Christian churches. This position was resisted by monastic communities in various Muslim-ruled parts of Armenia who were more strictly anti-Chalcedonian, and negotiations with the Byzantine Greeks mostly broke down after the death of Manuel I Komnenos. In the 1180s he turned to seeking conciliation with the Papacy, including sending an envoy to Pope Lucius III.

He died after a fall from his horse in 1193.

He authored several poems and theological works. Among these works is the poem Lamentation for Jerusalem, which centers on the 1187 fall of Jerusalem to Saladin and the defense of Cilician Armenians against Saladin and the Turkmens.

== Notes ==
Preceded by Nerses IV the Gracious	Catholicos of the Holy See of Cilicia; 1173–1193	Succeeded by Gregory V of Cilicia
