= Pope Mark VI of Alexandria =

Head of the Coptic Church from 1646 to 1656

- Pope of Alexandria & Patriarch of the See of St. Mark
- Papacy began: 20 April 1646 12 Parmouti 1362
- Papacy ended: 20 April 1656 12 Parmouti 1372
- Predecessor: Matthew III
- Successor: Matthew IV

Personal details
- Born: Tadros; 20 April 12 Parmouti Bahgourah, Egypt
- Died: 20 April 1656 12 Parmouti 1372 Egypt
- Buried: Saint Mercurius Church in Coptic Cairo
- Denomination: Coptic Orthodox Christian
- Residence: Church of the Virgin Mary (Haret Zuweila)

Pope Mark VI of Alexandria (Abba Marcos VI), 101st Pope of Alexandria & Patriarch of the See of St. Mark.

Pope Mark evidently entertained the Syrian Bishop Ahatallah for some time during his papacy. Bishop Ahatallah was in Cairo when Pope Pope Mark received a letter from Thomas, Archdeacon of the Saint Thomas Christian community of India asking for a new bishop in the face of Portuguese dominance. Unable or unwilling to send someone from his own church, Pope Mark evidently suggested that Bishop Ahatallah go to India instead.

== Notes ==
Oriental Orthodox titles
Preceded by Matthew III	Coptic Pope; 1646–1656	Succeeded by Matthew IV
