= Joachim of Alexandria =

Greek Patriarch of Alexandria, 1486–1567

- Died: 1567
- Honored in: Eastern Orthodox Church

Joachim (1448?-1567) served as Greek Patriarch of Alexandria between 1486 and 1567. He is a venerated as a saint within the Orthodox Church.

== Joachim and Russia ==
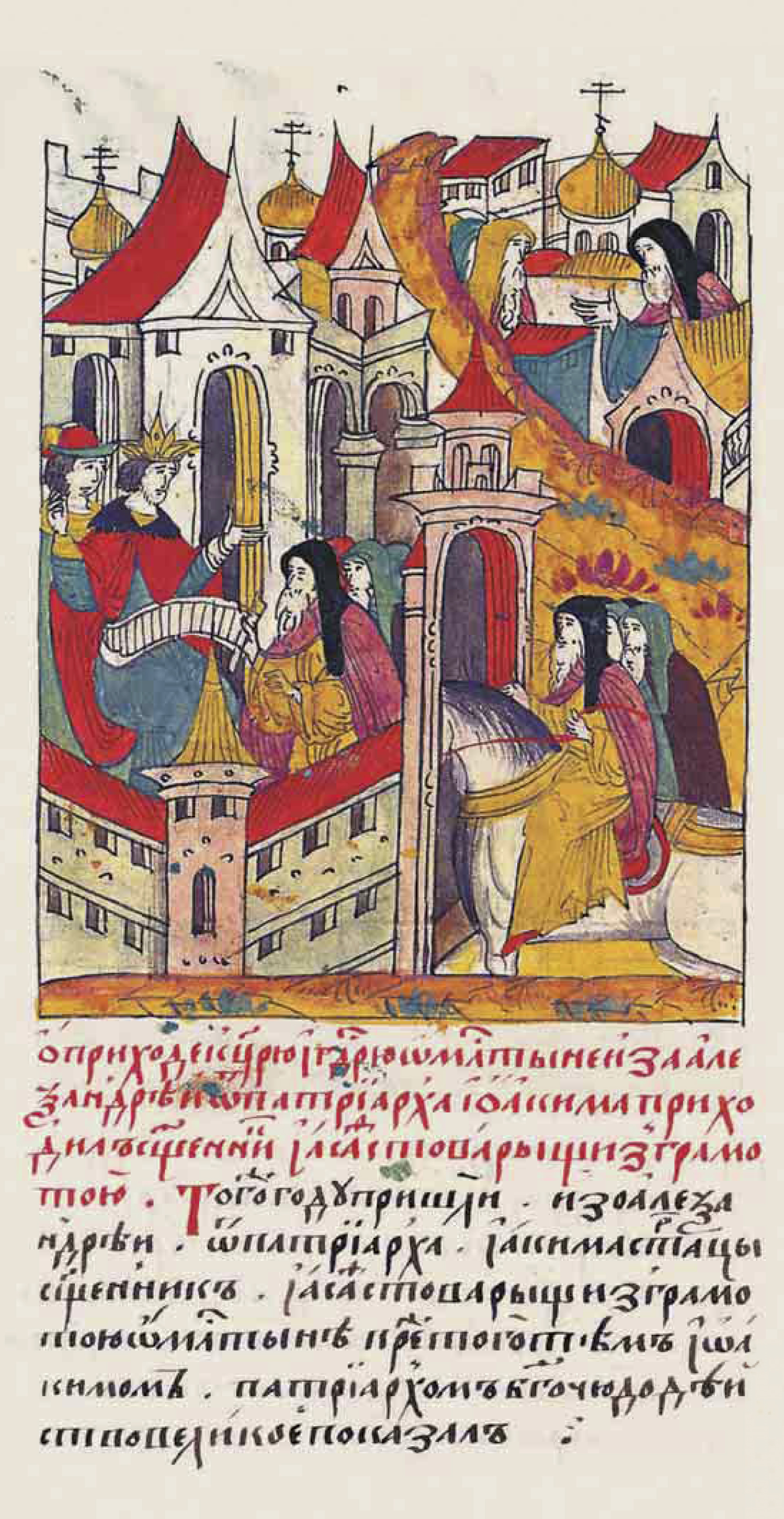
Joachim sending ambassadors to tsar Ivan IV

In 1556, Joachim sent a letter to the Russian Czar Ivan IV, asking the Orthodox monarch to provide some material assistance for the Saint Catherine's Monastery in the Sinai Peninsula, which had suffered from the Turks. In 1558, the Czar sent to Egypt a delegation led by archdeacon Gennady, who, however, died in Constantinople before he could reach Egypt. From then on, the embassy was headed by a Smolensk merchant Vasily Poznyakov. Poznyakov's delegation visited Alexandria, Cairo, and Sinai, brought the patriarch a fur coat and an icon sent by the Czar, and left an interesting account of its two and half years' travels.

Miracle of Moving a mountain called "Dour Dag" which may be Mokattam Mountain

The Greek Orthodox Christian tradition The Coptic Church has the tradition that the mountain was moved by a Simon the Tanner

| Preceded by Gregory V | Greek Patriarch of Alexandria; 1486–1567 | Succeeded by Silvester |
