= Patriarch Matthew of Alexandria =

Greek Patriarch of Alexandria from 1746 to 1766

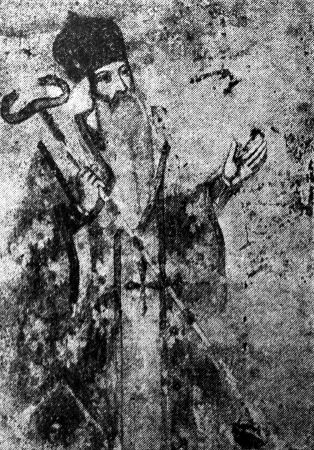
Patriarch Matthew of Alexandria.

Matthew Psaltis served as Greek Orthodox Patriarch of Alexandria between 1746 and 1766. He was born in the Greek island of Andros.

Preceded by Cosmas III	Greek Orthodox Patriarch of Alexandria; 1746–1766	Succeeded by Cyprian
