= Patriarch Athanasius III of Alexandria =

Greek Patriarch of Alexandria, 1276–1316

Athanasius III served as Greek Patriarch of Alexandria between 1276 and 1308.

== Relations with the Church of Rome ==
Athanasius, then ill with gout, attended the Council of Blachernae in 1285 which repudiated the attempted union at Lyons. However, that council did not place the Latins under formal anathema, and this may have been due to the influence of Athanasius. According to Kenneth M. Setton, "Athanasius III of Alexandria was also in communion with Rome at the time of his death in 1308 at the hands of the Moslems. He had, it seems, accepted the provisions of union enunciated at the Council of Lyons in 1274."

Since Pope Innocent III appointed a titular Latin Patriarch of Alexandria in 1310, it is likely that ecclesiastical communion with Rome had been broken shortly after the Athanasius III episcopate. The schism between Rome and Alexandria, then, could be reasonably dated to 1308.

Preceded by Nicholas II	Greek Patriarch of Alexandria; 1276–1316	Succeeded by Gregory II
