= Gregory of Bulgaria =

Patriarch of Bulgaria from 940 to 960

- Patriarch of Bulgaria
- Church: Bulgarian Orthodox Church
- Installed: c. 940
- Term ended: c. 960
- Successor: Damian

Personal details
- Denomination: Eastern Orthodox Church

Gregory (Bulgarian: Григорий) was the fourth Bulgarian Patriarch of the Bulgarian Orthodox Church. Gregory of Bulgaria was Patriarch during driving Simeon I of Bulgaria when Bulgaria was in her golden century.
