= Gregory VI of Cilicia =

Gregory VI of Cilicia Գրիգոր Զ. Ապիրատ
- Installed: 1194
- Term ended: 1203
- Predecessor: Gregory V of Cilicia
- Successor: John VI the Affluent

Gregory VI of Cilicia (Armenian: Գրիգոր Զ. Ապիրատ; also Gregory VI Apiratsi or Grigor VI Apirat) was the Catholicos of the Armenian Church from 1194 to 1203, located in Sis. In 1198, he proclaimed a union between Rome and the Armenian Church.

Gregory VI was a nephew of Gregory III of Cilicia and Nerses IV the Gracious. He was favorable to the Latins and had been nominated by Prince Levon I of Armenia (the future King Levon I), because of the need for an alliance. This election created a schism in the Armenian Church, however, and a rival anti-patriarch was elected in Greater Armenia.

Gregory's announcement of union was not followed in deeds however, as the local clergy and populace was strongly opposed to it.

When Levon, Lord of Cilicia, asked that the Pope and the Emperor recognize him as king, the condition was that the Armenian Church should join the Roman rite. He formally accepted the union, but this again was without effect as the Armenian clergy was strongly opposed to it, and never accepted the doctrine of the double nature of Christ. Gregory VI crowned him King of Armenia in 1198/1199 and the Cilician Armenian kingdom began.

| Preceded by Gregory V of Cilicia | Catholicos of the Holy See of Cilicia; 1194–1203 | Succeeded by John VI the Affluent |
