= Patriarch Peter VI of Alexandria =

7th-8th century Greek Patriarch of Alexandria

Peter VI was the Greek Patriarch of Alexandria sometime between the 7th and 8th centuries.

Preceded by Peter V	Greek Patriarch of Alexandria; 7th–8th centuries	Succeeded by Theophylactus
