= Cosmas I of Alexandria =

8th-century Greek Patriarch of Alexandria

Cosmas I or Kosmas I (Greek: Κοσμάς Α′) served as Greek Patriarch of Alexandria between c. 727 and his death in 768.

Cosmas was the first residential Chalcedonian (Melkite) patriarch to be established in Alexandria following the Muslim conquest of Egypt in the 640s. The see had remained vacant since, but Cosmas was appointed with the consent of both the Umayyad Caliph and the Byzantine Emperor. The chronicler Theophanes the Confessor reports that in 742/3, he abjured Monotheletism, the dominant doctrine among Alexandrian Melkites since it had been promulgated by Emperor Heraclius. As Cosmas himself was most likely not a Monothelete, this has been interpreted by modern scholarship as a garbled reference to Alexandria's recognition by the other Chalcedonian patriarchates.

== Sources ==
- Kazhdan, Alexander, ed. (1991). The Oxford Dictionary of Byzantium. Oxford and New York: Oxford University Press. ISBN 978-0-19-504652-6.

Vacant Muslim conquest of Egypt Title last held by Onopsus	Greek Patriarch of Alexandria ca. 727–768	Succeeded by Politianus
