= Patriarch Michael I of Alexandria =

Greek Patriarch of Alexandria, 860-870

Michael I served as Greek Patriarch of Alexandria between 860 and 870.

Preceded by Sophronius I	Greek Patriarch of Alexandria; 860–870	Succeeded by Michael II
