= Patriarch Joannicius of Alexandria =

Greek Patriarch of Alexandria from 1645 to 1657

Joannicius served as Greek Patriarch of Alexandria between 1645 and 1657.

Eastern Orthodox Church titles
Preceded by Nicephorus	Greek Patriarch of Alexandria; 1645–1657	Succeeded by Paisius
