= Patriarch Nicholas I of Alexandria =

Greek Patriarch of Alexandria, 1210–1243

Patriarch Nicholas I served as Greek Patriarch of Alexandria between 1210 and 1243.

== Relations with the Church of Rome ==
Like his predecessor, Nicholas I maintained communion with the See of Rome. He ordained a Latin rite priest and at the invitation of Innocent III of Rome, sent representatives to participate in the Fourth Lateran Council (1215).

In 1218–1219, Crusaders captured Damietta as a base to invade and ravage Egypt from the Ayyubid Muslims. After a crushing defeat in 1221, Crusaders surrendered Damietta and signed an 8-year truce. Native Egyptian Christians underwent renewed persecution by the Muslims in retaliation. Patriarch Nicholas died in deep poverty, 6 years before Crusaders returned to briefly capture Damietta before being retaken by the Muslims.

| Preceded by Mark III | Greek Patriarch of Alexandria; 1210–1243 | Succeeded by Gregory I |
