= Pope Mark V of Alexandria =

Head of the Coptic Church from 1603 to 1619

Pope Mark V
- Pope of Alexandria & Patriarch of the See of St. Mark
- Papacy began: 1603
- Papacy ended: 1619
- Predecessor: Gabriel VIII
- Successor: John XV

Personal details
- Born: Egypt
- Died: 1619 Egypt
- Denomination: Coptic Orthodox Christian
- Residence: Church of the Virgin Mary (Haret Zuweila)

Pope Mark V of Alexandria was the 98th Pope of Alexandria & Patriarch of the See of St. Mark from 1603 to his death in 1619.

Oriental Orthodox titles
| Preceded by Gabriel VIII | Coptic Pope; 1602/1603–1619 | Succeeded by John XV |
