= Patriarch Elias I of Alexandria =

Greek Patriarch of Alexandria, 963–1000

Elias I served as Greek Patriarch of Alexandria between 963 and 1000 AD.

Preceded by Job	Greek Patriarch of Alexandria; 963–1000	Succeeded by Arsenius
