= Patriarch Gregory V of Alexandria =

Greek Patriarch of Alexandria from 1484-1486

Gregory V served as Greek Patriarch of Alexandria for two years, between 1484 and 1486.

Preceded by Mark VI	Greek Patriarch of Alexandria; 1484–1486	Succeeded by Joachim
