= Patriarch Gregory I of Alexandria =

Greek Patriarch of Alexandria in 1243–1263

Gregory I served as Greek Patriarch of Alexandria between 1243 and 1263.

Preceded by Nicholas I	Greek Patriarch of Alexandria; 1243–1263	Succeeded by Nicholas II
