= Patriarch Sophronius III of Alexandria =

12th-century Greek Patriarch of Alexandria

Sophronius III (Greek: Σωφρόνιος, romanized: Sōphronios) served as Greek Patriarch of Alexandria between 1137 and 1171.

In 1161, he was in Constantinople to attend the wedding of Emperor Manuel I Komnenos and Maria of Antioch. He may also be the patriarch who Theodore Balsamon says was pressured to replace the Liturgy of Saint Mark, native to Egypt, with the Liturgy of Saint John Chrysostom, favoured by Constantinople. A copy of the chrism liturgy from Sophronius' pontificate is preserved on a scroll from Saint Catherine's Monastery (Sinai Greek NF/E 55).

Preceded by Theodosius II	Greek Patriarch of Alexandria; 1137–1171	Succeeded by Elias II
