= Gerasimus III of Alexandria =

Greek Patriarch of Alexandria from 1783 to 1788

Gerasimus III served as Greek Orthodox Patriarch of Alexandria between 1783 and 1788.

Preceded by Cyprian	Greek Orthodox Patriarch of Alexandria; 1783–1788	Succeeded by Parthenius II
