= Patriarch Michael II of Alexandria =

Greek Patriarch of Alexandria, 870–903

Michael II served as Greek Patriarch of Alexandria between 870 and 903.

| Preceded by Michael I | Greek Patriarch of Alexandria; 870–903 | Succeeded by Christodoulus |
