= Patriarch Peter V of Alexandria =

7th-century Greek Patriarch of Alexandria

Peter V (also referred to as Petros V) served as Greek Patriarch of Alexandria sometime between the 7th and 8th centuries (exact dates are not known).

Records showed that signed the Records of the 6th Ecumenical Council (also referred to as Third Council of Constantinople) that occurred in between 680-681 as “Bishop of Alexandria”. From 652-727 there was a period of coadjutoration of the Patriarchal Throne, as a result of the Umayyad Caliphate and its Arab domination over Egypt

Preceded by Theodore II	Greek Patriarch of Alexandria; 7th–8th centuries	Succeeded by Peter VI
