= Patriarch Gregory III of Alexandria =

Greek Patriarch of Alexandria, 1354–1366

Gregory III served as Greek Patriarch of Alexandria between 1354 and 1366.

Preceded by Gregory II	Greek Patriarch of Alexandria; 1354–1366	Succeeded by Niphon
