= Patriarch Nicholas III of Alexandria =

Greek Patriarch of Alexandria in 1389–1398

Nicholas III served as Greek Patriarch of Alexandria between 1389 and 1398.

Preceded by Mark IV	Greek Patriarch of Alexandria; 1389–1398	Succeeded by Gregory IV
