= Patriarch Gerasimus I of Alexandria =

Greek Patriarch of Alexandria from 1620 to 1636

Gerasimus I served as Greek Patriarch of Alexandria between 1620 and 1636.

Eastern Orthodox Church titles
| Preceded by Cyril III | Greek Patriarch of Alexandria; 1620–1636 | Succeeded by Metrophanes |
