= Patriarch Gregory II of Alexandria =

Greek Patriarch of Alexandria in 1316–1354

Gregory II served as Greek Patriarch of Alexandria between 1316 and 1354.

Preceded by Athanasius III	Greek Patriarch of Alexandria; 1316–1354	Succeeded by Gregory III
