= Patriarch Mark III of Alexandria =

Greek Patriarch of Alexandria in 1180–1209

Mark III (Greek: Μάρκος Γ΄) served as Greek Patriarch of Alexandria between 1180 and 1209.

== Relations with the Church of Rome ==
At the time, many Latin merchants had settled in Egypt, along with priest chaplains, and Latin prisoners held by the Muslims. In 1190, Mark wrote to the Byzantine Canonist from Antioch, and later Patriarch of Antioch, Theodore Balsamon for his opinion on whether or not it was permitted to continue the practice of admitting the Latins to Holy Communion. Although the Canonist gave an uncompromisingly negative answer, Mark rejected it. Mark continued to remember the Pope of Rome in the diptychs and administer Holy Communion to Latins.

Preceded by Eleutherius	Greek Patriarch of Alexandria; 1180–1209	Succeeded by Nicholas I
