= Patriarch Nicholas II of Alexandria =

Egyptian Ambassador and Patriarch

Nicholas II was Greek Patriarch of Alexandria (1263–76). Before his ordination, he had been the Ambassador of the Sultan of Egypt in Constantinople.

Preceded by Gregory I	Greek Patriarch of Alexandria; 1263–1276	Succeeded by Athanasius III
