= Patriarch Nicholas IV of Alexandria =

Greek Patriarch of Alexandria, 1412–1417

Nicholas IV served as Greek Patriarch of Alexandria between 1412 and 1417.

Preceded by Gregory IV	Greek Patriarch of Alexandria; 1412–1417	Succeeded by Athanasius IV
