= Patriarch Mark IV of Alexandria =

Greek Patriarch of Alexandria in 1385–1389

Mark IV served as Greek Patriarch of Alexandria between 1385 and 1389.

Preceded by Niphon	Greek Patriarch of Alexandria; 1385–1389	Succeeded by Nicholas III
