= Patriarch Mark VI of Alexandria =

Greek Patriarch of Alexandria in 1459–1484

Mark VI served as Greek Patriarch of Alexandria between 1459 and 1484. He condemned the union between the Greek Orthodox Church and the Church of Rome and in 1467 sent two monks to Crete to counter the local propaganda of the Latin Church.

Preceded by Philotheus	Greek Patriarch of Alexandria; 1459–1484	Succeeded by Gregory V
