= Patriarch Gregory IV of Alexandria =

Greek Patriarch of Alexandria in 1398–1412

Gregory IV served as Greek Patriarch of Alexandria between 1398 and 1412.

Preceded by Nicholas III	Greek Patriarch of Alexandria; 1398–1412	Succeeded by Nicholas IV
