= Patriarch Alexander II of Alexandria =

Greek Patriarch of Alexandria in 1059–1062

Alexander II served as Greek Patriarch of Alexandria between 1059 and 1062.

Preceded by Leontius	Greek Patriarch of Alexandria; 1059–1062	Succeeded by John VI
