= Patriarch Mark V of Alexandria =

Greek Patriarch of Alexandria in 1425–1435

Mark V served as Greek Patriarch of Alexandria between 1425 and 1435.

| Preceded by Athanasius IV | Greek Patriarch of Alexandria; 1425–1435 | Succeeded by Philotheus |
