= Anthimus =

Anthimus, also spelled Anthimos, Anthinos or Anthinus, is a Greek name for males. In Italian and Spanish, the name is rendered as Antimo.

The name may refer to:

- Anthimus of Nicomedia, bishop and martyr who died during a persecution in the early 4th century
- Anthimus of Rome (died 303), saint, priest and martyr who died during the persecutions of Diocletian
- Anthimus of Tyana, bishop in AD 372; at times an opponent of Basil of Caesarea
- Anthimus (physician), Greek doctor at the court of Theodoric the Great and author of De observatione ciborum ("On the Observance of Foods")
- Anthimos Gazis (1758–1828), a hero of the Greek War of Independence
- Anthimus of Naples, Anthimus or Anthemus, the Duke of Naples from 801 until around 818

Anthimus is the name of seven Patriarchs of Constantinople:

- Patriarch Anthimus I of Constantinople, a Miaphysite patriarch of Constantinople in 535–536
- Patriarch Anthimus II of Constantinople (died 1628), reigned a few months in 1623
- Patriarch Anthimus III of Constantinople, reigned between 1822 and 1824
- Patriarch Anthimus IV of Constantinople (1785–1878), reigned between 1840 and 1841, and between 1848 and 1852
- Patriarch Anthimus V of Constantinople, reigned between 1841 and 1842
- Patriarch Anthimus VI of Constantinople (1790–1878), reigned three times: 1845–1848, 1853–1855, and 1871–1873
- Patriarch Anthimus VII of Constantinople (1835–1913), reigned between 1895 and 1896

Spelled Anthinus this name may refer to:

- Anthinus, a genus of air-breathing land snails

== See also ==
- Anthemius (disambiguation)
