= Timeline of autocephaly of Eastern Orthodox churches =

In the Eastern Orthodox Church, a "tomos of autocephaly" grants ecclesiastical independence from a mother church. As of 2025, there are 14 completely recognized autocephalous Eastern Orthodox churches, with 3 partially recognized Eastern Orthodox churches.

The "date" column is determined the most recent date with support from a Patriarch (self-declared autocephaly is not taken into consideration). The "date" column also excludes former autocephaly halted by a force, and re-granted later.

Timeline of the History of the main autocephalous Eastern Orthodox churches

Tomoi accepted by all canonical Eastern Orthodox churches
Tomoi accepted by most canonical Eastern Orthodox churches
Tomoi accepted by no canonical Eastern Orthodox churches*

*Any tomoi once proclaimed, but no longer accepted.

== 4th-century ==
| Date | Granter | Recipient | Recognized by |
|---|---|---|---|
| 325 | First Council of Nicaea | Patriarchate of Rome | Completely unrecognized after 1054 |
| 325 | First Council of Nicaea | Patriarchate of Alexandria | Completely recognized by all canonical Eastern Orthodox churches |
| 325 | First Council of Nicaea | Patriarch of Antioch | Completely recognized by all canonical Eastern Orthodox churches |
| 381 | First Council of Constantinople | Patriarchate of Constantinople | Completely recognized by all canonical Eastern Orthodox churches |

== 5th-century ==
| Date | Granter | Recipient | Recognized by |
|---|---|---|---|
| 431 | Council of Ephesus | Cypriot Orthodox Church | Completely recognized by all canonical Eastern Orthodox churches |
| 451 | Council of Chalcedon | Patriarchate of Jerusalem | Completely recognized by all canonical Eastern Orthodox churches |

== 15th-century ==
| Date | Granter | Recipient | Recognized by |
|---|---|---|---|
| 1448 | Jonah of Moscow | Russian Orthodox Church | Completely unrecognized |

== 16th-century ==
| Date | Granter | Recipient | Recognized by |
|---|---|---|---|
| 1589 | Ecumenical Patriarch Jeremias II of Constantinople | Russian Orthodox Church | Completely recognized by all canonical Eastern Orthodox churches |

== 19th-century ==
| Date | Granter | Recipient | Recognized by |
|---|---|---|---|
| 29 June 1850 | Ecumenical Patriarch Anthimus IV of Constantinople | Church of Greece | Completely recognized by all canonical Eastern Orthodox churches |
| 1879 | Ecumenical Patriarch Joachim III of Constantinople | Serbian Orthodox Church | Completely recognized by all canonical Eastern Orthodox churches |
| 25 April 1885 | Ecumenical Patriarch Jochim IV of Constantinople | Romanian Orthodox Church | Completely recognized by all canonical Eastern Orthodox churches |

== 20th-century ==
| Date | Granter | Recipient | Recognized by |
|---|---|---|---|
| 13 November 1924 | Ecumenical Patriarch Gregory VII of Constantinople | Polish Orthodox Church | Completely recognized by all canonical Eastern Orthodox churches |
| 17 April 1937 | Ecumenical Patriarch Benjamin I of Constantinople | Albanian Orthodox Church | Completely recognized by all canonical Eastern Orthodox churches |
| 31 October 1943 | Patriarch Sergius of Moscow | Georgian Orthodox Church | Completely recognized by all canonical Eastern Orthodox churches |
| 1945 | Patriarch Alexy I of Moscow | Bulgarian Orthodox Church | Completely recognized by all canonical Eastern Orthodox churches |
| 9 December 1951 | Patriarch Alexy I of Moscow | Orthodox Church of the Czech Lands and Slovakia | Completely recognized by all canonical Eastern Orthodox churches |
| 10 April 1970 | Patriarch Alexy I of Moscow | Orthodox Church in America | Russian Orthodox Church, Georgian Orthodox Church, Polish Orthodox Church, Bulgarian Orthodox Church, Czech and Slovakian Orthodox Church |

== 21st-century ==
| Date | Granter | Recipient | Recognized By |
|---|---|---|---|
| 5 May 2019 | Ecumenical Patriarch Bartholomew of Constantinople | Orthodox Church of Ukraine | Patriarchate of Alexandria, Church of Greece, Ecumenical Patriarchate |
| 5 June 2022 | Patriarch Porfirije of Serbia | Macedonian Orthodox Church | Romanian Orthodox Church, Serbian Orthodox Church, Russian Orthodox Church, Polish Orthodox Church, Ukrainian Orthodox Church, Bulgarian Orthodox Church, Czech and Slovakian Orthodox Church |
