= Nasi (Caphyatis) =

Coordinates: 37°49′05″N 22°04′30″E

Nasi or Nasoi (Ancient Greek: Νάσοι), also known as Nesi or Nesoi (Nῆσοι), was a village in the Caphyatis (the territory of Caphyae), in Arcadian Azania in ancient Arcadia, Greece.

Nasi was the place where the waters from the Orchomenus plain resurfaced as the river Tragus. The village at this resurgence was called Rheunus. It was situated at 7 stadia (1.1 km) from Caphyae and 50 stades (8 km) from the river Ladon.

The site of Nasi is located near modern Dara.
