= Gregory VI of Constantinople =

Ecumenical Patriarch of Constantinople from 1835 to 1840 and from 1867 to 1871

- Ecumenical Patriarch of Constantinople
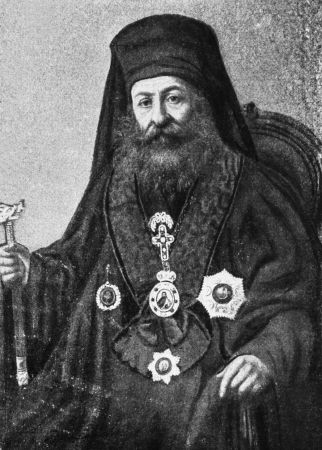
- 1907 lithograph of Gregory VI
- Church: Church of Constantinople
- Diocese: Constantinople
- See: Ecumenical Patriarchate
- Installed: 27 September 1835; 10 February 1867
- Term ended: 20 February 1840; 10 June 1871
- Predecessor: Constantius II of Constantinople; Sophronius III of Constantinople
- Successor: Anthimus IV of Constantinople; Anthimus VI of Constantinople

Personal details
- Born: Georgios Fourtouniadis (Γεώργιος Φουρτουνιάδης); 1 March 1798 Fanaraki (Rumelifeneri)
- Died: 8 June 1881 (aged 83) Arnavutköy, Ottoman Empire
- Buried: Holy Church of Asomati
- Denomination: Eastern Orthodox Church
- Parents: Angelos and Soultana Fourtouniadis

Gregory VI of Constantinople (Greek: Γρηγόριος), baptismal name Georgios Fourtouniadis (Greek: Γεώργιος Φουρτουνιάδης; 1 March 1798 – 8 June 1881) was Ecumenical Patriarch of Constantinople in the periods 1835–1840 and 1867–1871.

He was born on 1 March 1798 in the village Fanaraki (now known as Rumelifeneri) on the Bosphorus. In 1815 he was ordained deacon of the Metropolis of Durusu (Derkos/Δέρκος), adopting the name Gregory VI. On 24 September 1824 he was designated great archdeacon of the Ecumenical Patriarchate of Constantinople by Chrysanthus of Constantinople. In 1825 he was ordained great protosyncellus, and on 21 October that year, he was made metropolitan bishop of Pelagonia (modern-day Bitola). In August 1833, he was elected metropolitan bishop of Serres. After much discussion and recriminations and with the support of representatives of the guilds (esnaf) he was elected Ecumenical Patriarch on 27 September 1835.

In the opinion of a contemporary, the historian Manouil Gedeon, the new patriarch was characterized by a deep "zeal for the Church and austerity in his customs - but also by an unforgivable inflexibility in his own ideas" ("Τον Γρηγόριον ΣΤ' εχαρακτήριζε ζήλος υπέρ της Εκκλησίας, αυστηρότης εν τοις ηθεσιν, άλλ' ασύγγνωστος εμμονή εις πάσαν αυτόυ ιδέαν"). Gregory VI published canonical provisions concerning marriages (matchmaking, dowry), the education of monks and dogmatic differences with the Catholic Church and the Protestants, he forbid burial inside churches and he condemned the translation of the Bible in a simpler form of the Greek language. On 19 December 1839 he published a Patriarchal and Synodic newsletter («Περί της νεωστί αναφανείσης αντιχρίστου διδαλίας του Θεοσεβισμού») against Theophilos Kairis and his teaching.

The increasing appearance of Protestant tracts and missionaries in the eastern Mediterranean following the end of the Napoleonic Wars was particularly distressing to Patriarch Gregory VI. The vigour of Gregory VI's efforts to insulate his flock, not only in the Ottoman Empire but also in the Kingdom of Greece and the United States of the Ionian Islands, from heterodox religious influences incurred the displeasure of all governments in the region during the late 1830s. In 1839, these tensions came to a head when the patriarch issued an encyclical condemning various uncanonical changes to family law promulgated by the British colonial authorities on the Ionian Islands. The British ambassador, John Ponsonby, 1st Viscount Ponsonby, bluntly demanded the removal of Gregory VI and threatened to leave Constantinople over the matter. Under duress, the Ottoman foreign minister Mustafa Reşid Pasha agreed to Ponsonby's demand. The minister insisted, however, on delaying the dismissal until the Ottoman government could first legitimise its action by carrying out a formal judicial inquiry into Gregory VI's alleged misbehaviour.

Gregory VI was finally deposed by Sultan Abdülmecid I on 20 February 1840 and retired to his house in Arnavutköy. He was reelected 27 years later, after the resignation of Sophronius III of Constantinople, on 10 February 1867, and resigned on 10 June 1871. He died on 8 June 1881. He was buried in the forecourt of the Holy Church of Asomati in Arnavutköy and in 1906 his bones were recovered.

== Bibliography ==
- Οικουμενικό Πατριαρχείο.
- Augustinos, Gerasimos; The Greeks of Asia Minor - Confession, Community, and Ethnicity in the Nineteenth Century, Kent, OH and London, Kent State University, 1992, pp. 117–119.
- Fairey, Jack; The Great Powers and Orthodox Christendom - The Crisis over the Eastern Church in the Era of the Crimean War, London, Palgrave Macmillan, 2015, especially Chapters 2 and 7.
- Μαμώνη, Κυριακή. "Αγώνες του Οικουμενικού Πατριαρχείου κατά των Μισσιοναρίων" [Struggles of the Ecumenical Patriarchate against the Missionaries], Μνημοσύνη 8, 1980–1981, pp. 179–212.
- Χαμχούγιας, Χρήστος, Ο Οικουμενικός Πατριάρχης Κωνσταντινουπόλεως Γρηγόριος ΣΤ' ο Φουρτουνιάδης εν μέσω εθνικών και εθνοφυλετικών ανταγωνισμών, διδακτορική διατριβή, Αριστοτέλειο Πανεπιστήμιο Θεσσαλονίκης (ΑΠΘ), Θεολογική Σχολή, Τμήμα Ποιμαντικής και Κοινωνικής Θεολογίας, 2006.

Eastern Orthodox Church titles
Preceded by Constantius II	Ecumenical Patriarch of Constantinople; 1835 – 1840	Succeeded by Anthimus IV
Preceded by Sophronius III	Ecumenical Patriarch of Constantinople; 1867 – 1871	Succeeded by Anthimus VI (2)
