= Tragus =

Tragus can mean:

- Hieronymus Bock's Latinized name
- Tragus (ear), a small pointed eminence of the outer ear
- Tragus (plant), a genus of grass
- Tragus (river), a river of Arcadia, Ancient Greece
- Tragus Group, a UK limited company operating restaurants - renamed to Casual Dining Group in 2015

The name comes the Ancient Greek tragos (τράγος), meaning 'goat'.
