= Meletius III =

Meletius III may refer to:

- Meletius III of Constantinople, Ecumenical Patriarch in 1845
- Meletius III of Athens
