= Greek National Road 75 =

Trunk road in Greece

National Road 75
- Εθνική Οδός 75
- Route of the EO75 road, in blue

Route information
- Length: 34.9 km (21.7 mi)
- Existed: 9 July 1963–present

Major junctions
- South end: Kallimasia
- North end: Kardamyla

Location
- Country: Greece
- Regions: North Aegean
- Primary destinations: Kallimasia; Chios; Kardamyla

Highway system
- Highways in Greece; Motorways; National roads
← EO74	→ EO76

Greek National Road 75 (Greek: Εθνική Οδός 75), abbreviated as the EO75, is a national road in the island of Chios, Greece. The EO75 runs between Kallimasia and Kardamyla via the town of Chios, and is one of four national roads in the North Aegean region.

== Route ==
The EO75 is officially defined as a north–south road in the island of Chios: the road runs along the island's east coast, from Kallimasia in the south to Kardamyla in the north, passing through the town of Chios and Vrontados.

== History ==
Ministerial Decision G25871 of 9 July 1963 created the EO75 from the old EO71, which existed by royal decree from 1955 until 1963, and followed the same route as the current EO75.
