= Elymia =

Coordinates: 37°40′58″N 22°17′39″E

Elymia (Ancient Greek: Ἐλυμία) was a town of ancient Arcadia, on the confines of Mantineia and Orchomenus.

Its site is located east of the modern village of Levidi, where ancient remains were discovered.
