= Ionia, Chios =

Ionia Ιωνία
- Municipal unit
- Location within the regional unit

- Location within Greece
- Coordinates: 38°17′N 26°06′E
- Country: Greece
- Administrative region: North Aegean
- Regional unit: Chios
- Municipality: Chios

Area
  - Municipal unit: 48.3 km^{2} (18.6 sq mi)

Population (2021)
  - Municipal unit: 3,570
  - Municipal unit density: 73.9/km^{2} (191/sq mi)
- Time zone: UTC+2 (EET)
  - Summer (DST): UTC+3 (EEST)
- Vehicle registration: ΧΙ

Ionia (Greek: Ιωνία) is a former municipality on the island of Chios, North Aegean, Greece. Since the 2011 local government reform it is part of the municipality Chios, of which it is a municipal unit. It is located in the southeastern part of the island, and has a land area of 48.272 km². Its population was 3,570 at the 2021 census. The seat of the municipality was in Kallimasia. Other large towns are Nenita, Tholopotámi and Katarráktis.

== Notable people ==
- Joachim IV, Patriarch of Constantinople
