= Vlacherna, Arcadia =

Village in Peloponnese, Greece

Coordinates: 37.72°N 22.25°E

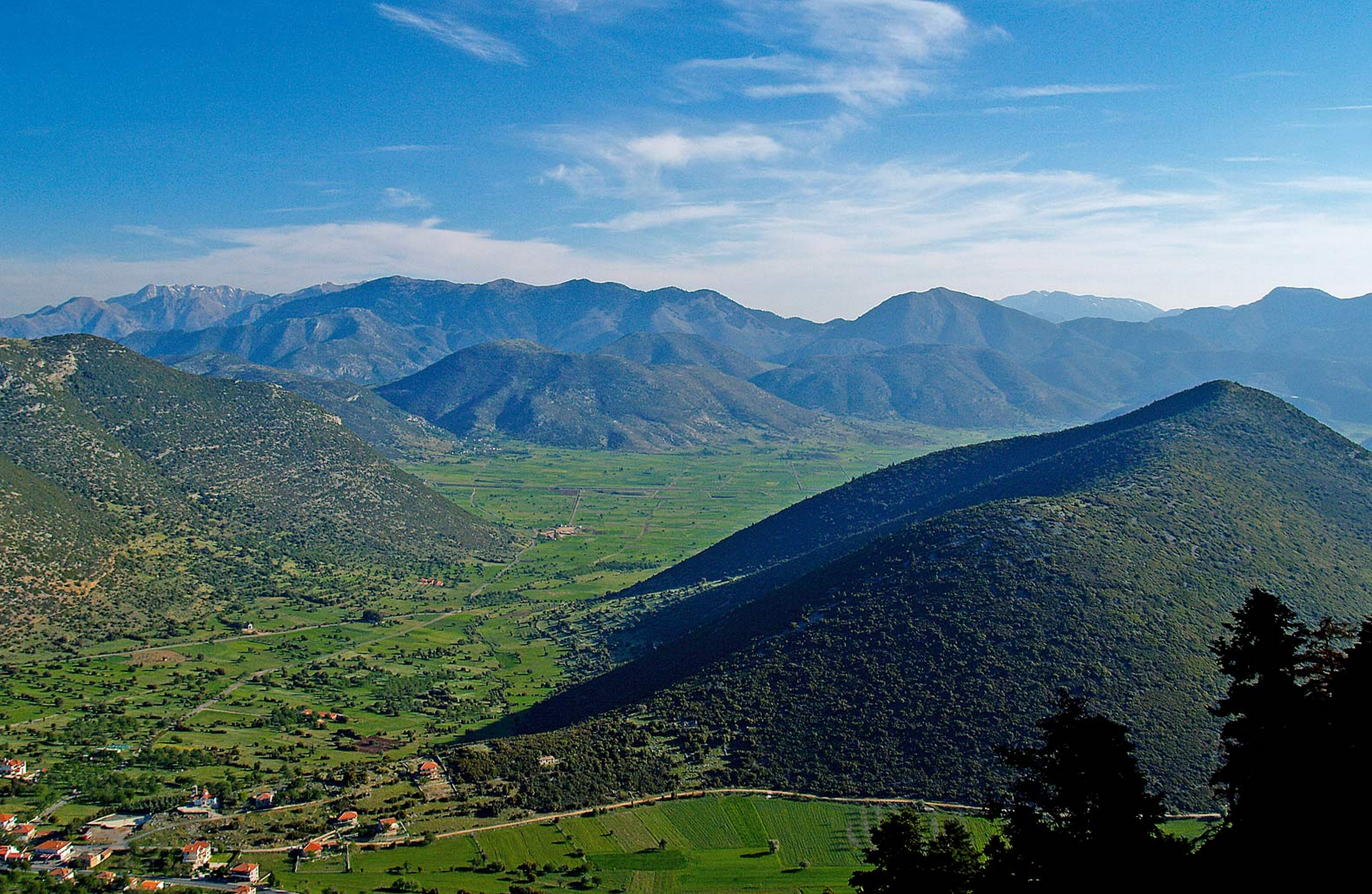
Vlacherna, opening to its closed karst basin (in the back)

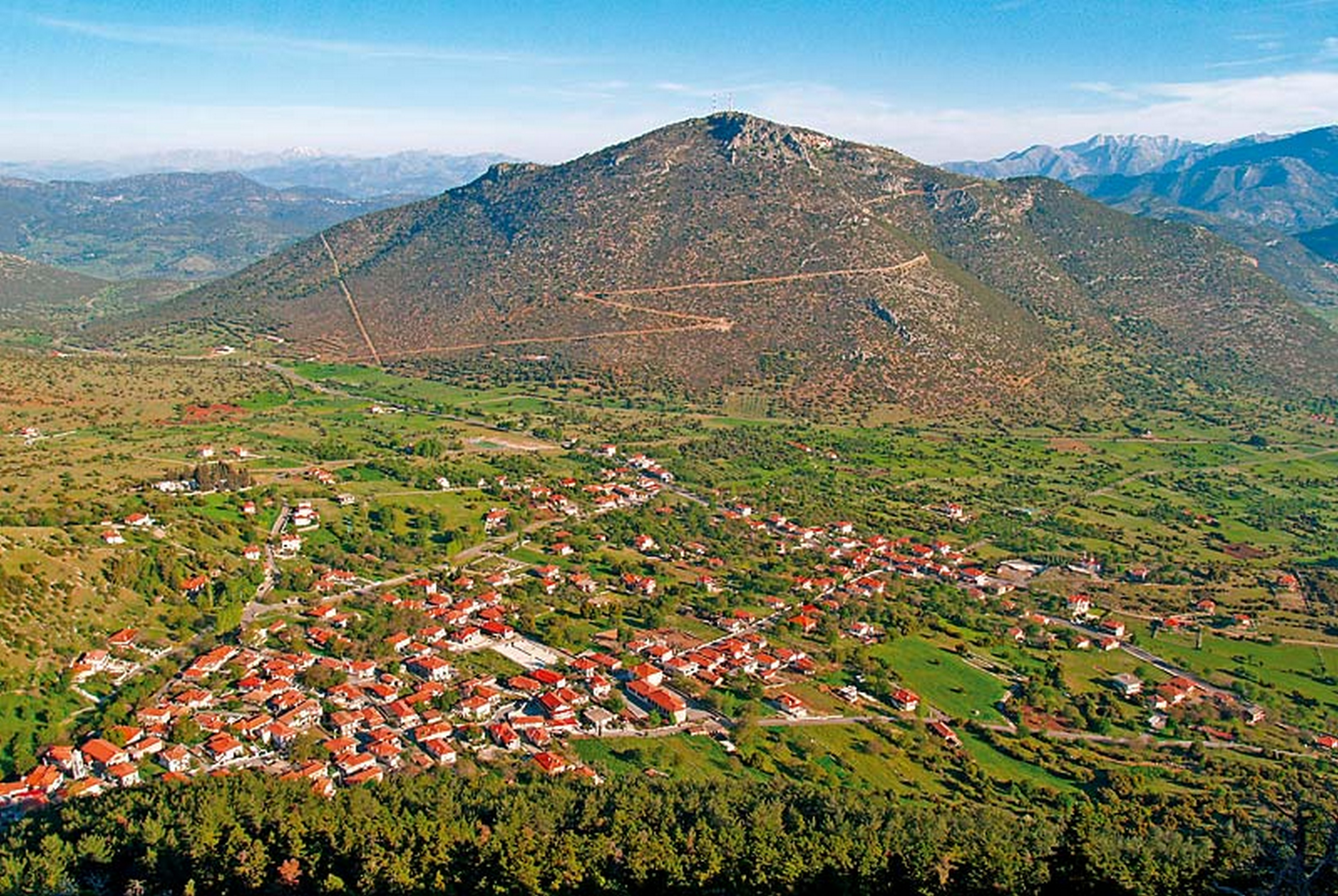
Village of Vlacherna

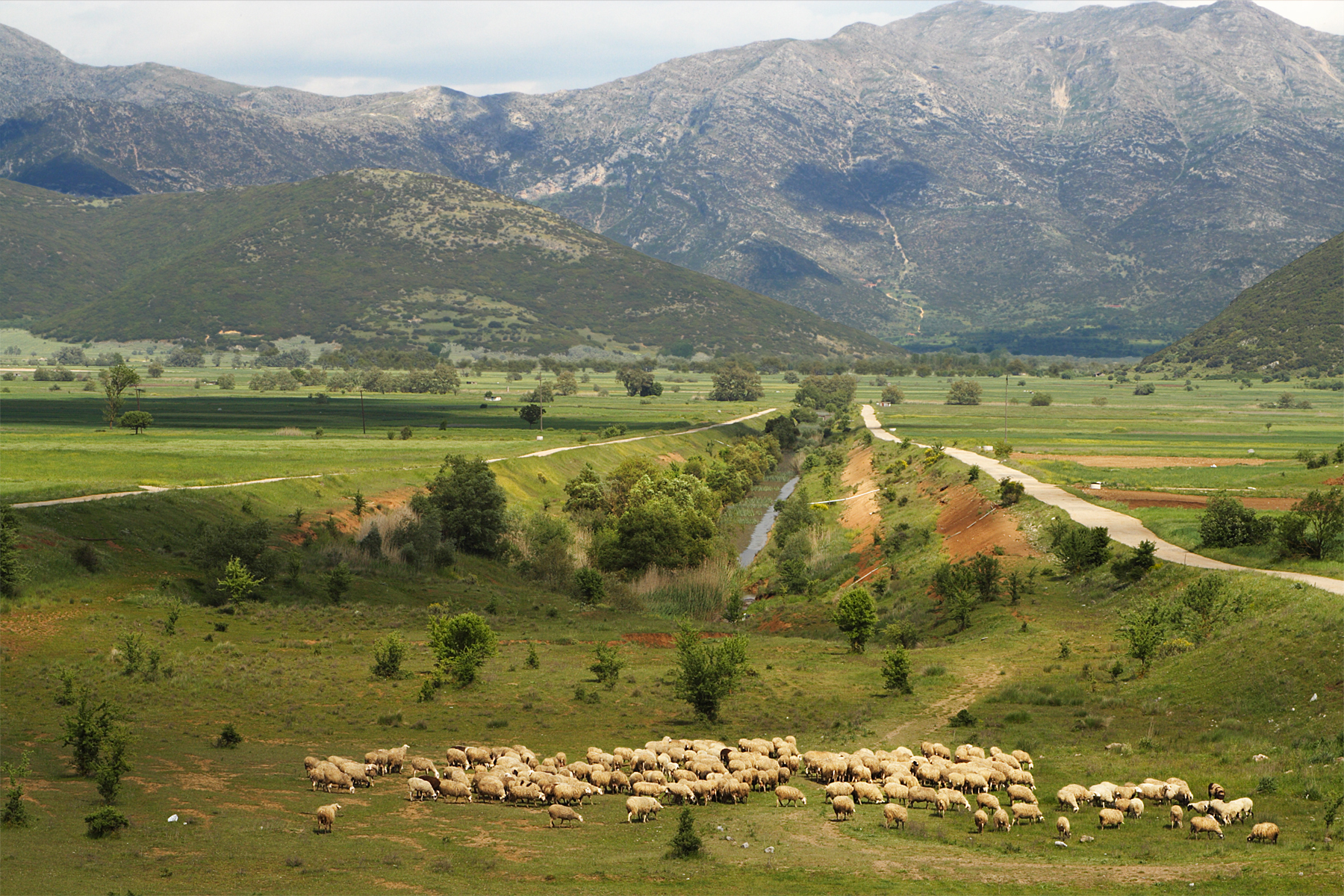
Closed karst basin: Vlacherna-Hotoussa-Kandila

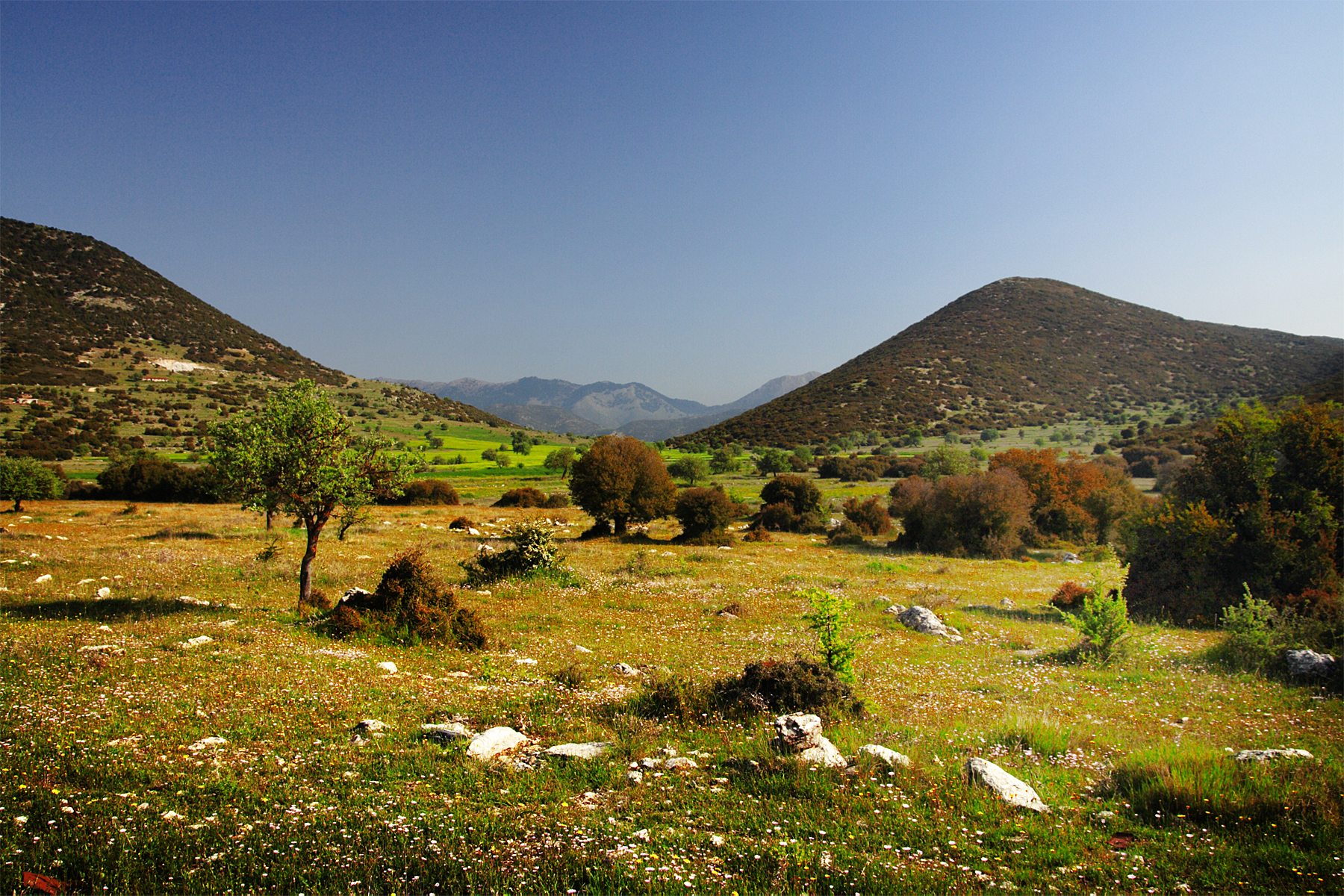
Karst territory near Vlacherna

Vlacherna is a settlement in Arcadia, Greece. Administratively, it is the seat of the local community, with 371 residents as of the 2011 census. It is a municipal unit of Levidi in the municipality of Tripoli (Kallikratis Plan, 2010). It is built at a height of 954 meters above sea level, on the slopes of Mainalo. It is 32 km from Tripoli, 7 km from Levidi and 12 km from Vytina.

Most villagers are farmers. For their sheep and goats and their fieldwork, they need the meadows and fields that are located in the widening plain below their village. But peculiarities of nature—too much or too little water, depending on the annual time—are a burden for them, also, because the plain is a large karst basin without surface drainage.

The photo with the sheep shows the main part of the basin, where attempts are made to avoid flooding by several ditches and subterranean drainage. However, when there is very much winter rain, floods are possible in spite of two ponors (katavothes) and an artificial tunnel. The flooding then forces the farmers to delay their cultivations. The basin has two extensions to the far northeast.

The first basin extension has a large karst spring (Sintzi Spring) right, where the surface of the sedimentary deposits of the basin touch the limestone formation of the mountain. Existence of water even in the dry summer period makes the soil more fertile for more grassland and acres to cultivate.

== Transport ==
Vlacherna is located on the intersections of the EO33 (from Patras), the EO74 (from Tripoli and Pyrgos) and Arcadia Provincial Roads 56 and 58: it is also on the route of the historic EO111, which existed from 1928 to 1955.

== See also ==
- Orchomenus (Arcadia)
