= Germanus IV of Constantinople =

Ecumenical Patriarch of Constantinople from 1842 to 1845 and from 1852 to 1853

- Ecumenical Patriarch of Constantinople
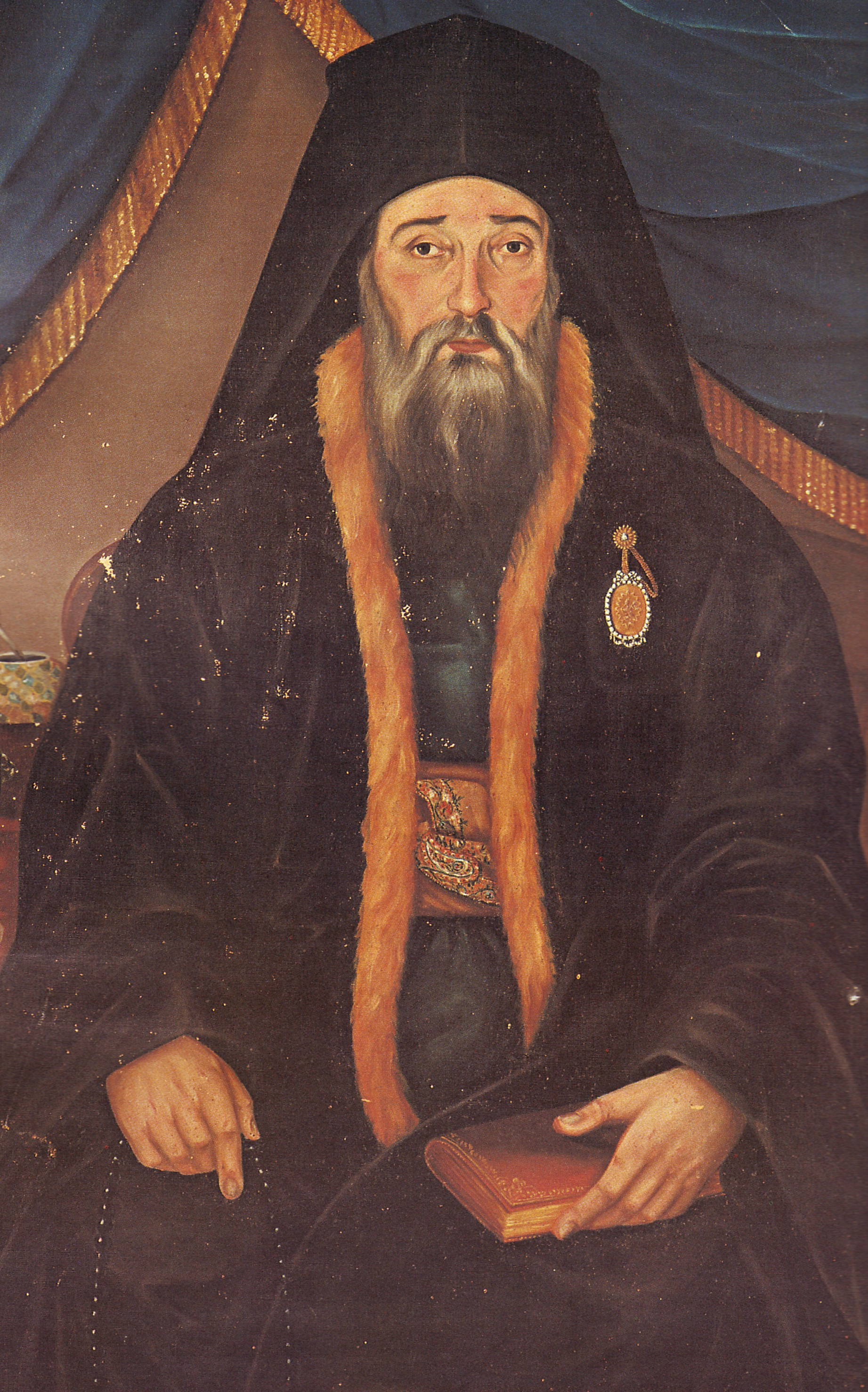
- Church: Church of Constantinople
- In office: 14 June 1842 – 18 April 1845; 1 November 1852 – 16 September 1853
- Predecessor: Anthimus V of Constantinople; Meletius III of Constantinople
- Successor: Anthimus IV of Constantinople; Anthimus VI of Constantinople

Personal details
- Born: 1788
- Died: 16 September 1853 (aged 64–65)
- Denomination: Eastern Orthodoxy

Germanus IV of Constantinople (Greek: Γερμανός; 1788 – 16 September 1853) served two terms as Ecumenical Patriarch of Constantinople, from 1842 to 1845 and from 1852 until his death on 16 September 1853.

He was born in the Balat, Fatih, a district on the European side of Constantinople in 1788, the son of John and Helen.

Around 1825, during the Patriarchate of Chrysanthus of Constantinople, Germanus became Grand Chancellor of the Patriarchate.

In August 1826, after the resignation of Metropolitan Paisios of Vidin, Germanus was elected his successor. He remained in this province until 1830, when he was exiled by the Ottoman government as a result of the Russo-Turkish War (1828–1829) and the rising Bulgarian nationalism. Germanus then stayed in Constantinople until May 1831, when he was elected Metropolitan of Drama, Greece. On November 22, 1835, he was elected Metropolitan of Derkoi after the death of his predecessor, Nikephoros.

Germanus was elected to the patriarchal throne for the first time in 1842. He held the post until 1845 when he was succeeded by Meletius III of Constantinople. Restored to the throne in 1852, he occupied it until his death the next year.

During his patriarchy, he especially took care of the poor. He founded many churches, schools, libraries and orphanages. His name was particularly associated with the education of the Orthodox clergy, as he was the founder of the Theological School of Halki in the monastery of the Holy Trinity. The school operated regularly until 1971 when it was closed by law and educated many theologians, priests, bishops and patriarchs of note.

== Bibliography ==
- Ecumenical Patriarchate.

Eastern Orthodox Church titles
Preceded by Anthimus V	Ecumenical Patriarch of Constantinople; 1842 – 1845	Succeeded by Anthimus IV (2)
Preceded by Meletius III	Ecumenical Patriarch of Constantinople; 1852 – 1853	Succeeded by Anthimus VI (2)
