= Panagitsa, Arcadia =

Panagitsa Παναγίτσα
- Community
- Location within Greece
- Coordinates: 37°46′N 22°13′E
- Country: Greece
- Administrative region: Peloponnese
- Regional unit: Arcadia
- Municipality: Tripoli
- Municipal unit: Levidi
- Elevation: 540 m (1,770 ft)

Population (2021)
  - Community: 43
- Time zone: UTC+2 (EET)
  - Summer (DST): UTC+3 (EEST)
- Postal code: 220 17
- Area code: 27960
- Vehicle registration: TP

Panagitsa (Greek: Παναγίτσα) is a community in the municipal unit of Levidi, northern Arcadia, Greece. It is situated at the edge of a wide valley, at 540 m elevation. It is 3 km west of Chotoussa, 5 km southeast of Dara, 6 km east of Prasino and 12 km northwest of Levidi. The Greek National Road 33 (Patras - Tripoli) passes through the village.

== Historical population ==
Year	Village population
1981	151
1991	76
2001	115
2011	43
2021	43

== See also ==
- List of settlements in Arcadia
