= Constantius I of Constantinople =

Ecumenical Patriarch of Constantinople from 1830 to 1834

- Ecumenical Patriarch of Constantinople
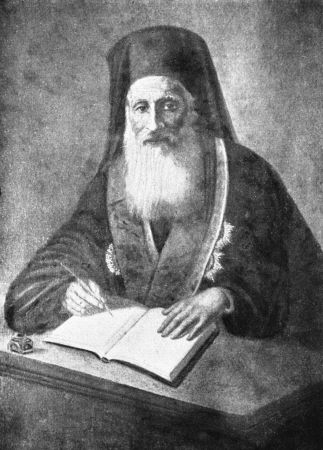
- 1907 depiction of Constantius I
- Church: Church of Constantinople
- Diocese: Constantinople
- See: Ecumenical Patriarchate
- Installed: 6 July 1830
- Term ended: 18 August 1834
- Predecessor: Agathangelus of Constantinople
- Successor: Constantius II of Constantinople

Personal details
- Born: 1770 Constantinople
- Died: 5 January 1859 (aged 88–89) Burgazada
- Denomination: Eastern Orthodox Church
- Education: NaUKMA

Constantius I of Constantinople (Greek: Κωνστάντιος; 1770 – 5 January 1859) was Ecumenical Patriarch of Constantinople during the period 1830–1834.

He was born in 1770 in Constantinople. He studied in the Patriarchal School, in Iași and in Kiev. In 1805, he was elected Archbishop of Sinai, a position he held until he was elected Ecumenical Patriarch in 1830. He resigned in 1834 and devoted his life to studying and writing. He died on 5 January 1859.

== Notes and references ==
Eastern Orthodox Church titles
Preceded by Agathangelus	Ecumenical Patriarch of Constantinople; 1830 – 1834	Succeeded by Constantius II
