= Anthimus III of Constantinople =

Ecumenical Patriarch of Constantinople from 1822 to 1824

- Ecumenical Patriarch of Constantinople
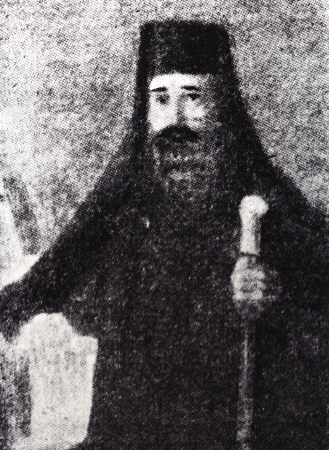
- Church: Church of Constantinople
- Diocese: Constantinople
- See: Ecumenical Patriarchate
- Installed: 28 July 1822
- Term ended: 9 July 1824
- Predecessor: Eugenius II of Constantinople
- Successor: Chrysanthus of Constantinople

Personal details
- Born: 1762 Koronis, Naxos, Ottoman Greece
- Died: 13 August 1842 (aged 79–80) Smyrna, Ottoman Empire
- Denomination: Eastern Orthodox Church

Anthimus III of Constantinople (Greek: Ἄνθιμος; 1762 – 1842) was Ecumenical Patriarch of Constantinople during the period 1822–1824.

== Biography ==
He was born in Koronis (Komiaki) of Naxos in 1762. His father was a priest in the village, with descent from the Laconia. His last name was Chorianopoulos. He served as deacon of the Patriarchate during the Patriarchy of Neophytus VII of Constantinople and was Great Archdeacon from 1791. In April 1797 he became Protosyncellus of the Ecumenical Patriarchate.

He was elected Metropolitan of Smyrna in 1797 as successor of the Metropolitan Gregory, who was elected Patriarch, as Gregory V of Constantinople. In 1821 he was elected Metropolitan of Chalcedon (1821–1822). The Ottomans, in retaliation for the spread the Greek Revolution, arrested him together with other hierarchs and imprisoned him for 7 months in the dungeons of a prison of Constantinople. In 1822, after the hanging of Gregory V and the death of his successor Eugenius II of Constantinople from torture suffered at the hands of the Ottomans, Anthimus, who was still imprisoned, was elected Patriarch.

As Patriarch he succeeded in maintaining the independence of the Church of Cyprus and its prerogatives, during a period when the Ottomans proceeded with executions of clerics and kodjabashis on the island, while even member of the Holy Synod advocated the abolition of the Church. Anthimus III also refused to allow a British Protestant to publish a translation of the Bible to Demotic Greek by the Patriarchal typography.

In 1824, Anthimus III was deposed by Sultan Mahmud II because he refused to cooperate with him against the Greek Revolution, and with the accusation that he favoured the independence of the Serbs from the Ottoman Empire. He took refuge in Üsküdar and was later exiled to the Timiou Prodromou Monastery in Kayseri of Cappadocia. After many months of exile and many hardships that affected his health, in December 1825 the Sultan allowed him to return to Smyrna.

There he stayed in a small apartment in the Upper Mahalla and often participated in the local ecclesiastic life. He also served as deputy of the Metropolis of Smyrna in 1831 and in 1833. He died on 13 August 1842 in the Greek Hospital of Smyrna and bequeathed his entire fortune to churches and charitable institutions of the city. His magnificent funeral was held by the Metropolitan of Ephesus, Anthimus VI of Constantinople and was buried in the church of John the Theologian, where until the Asia Minor Catastrophe there was also a big icon of him.

== Bibliography ==
- Οικουμενικό Πατριαρχείο.
- Encyclopaedia of the Hellenic World, Asia Minor.

Eastern Orthodox Church titles
Preceded by Eugenius II	Ecumenical Patriarch of Constantinople; 1822 – 1824	Succeeded by Chrysanthus
