= Sophronius III of Constantinople =

Ecumenical Patriarch of Constantinople from 1863 to 1866

- Ecumenical Patriarch of Constantinople
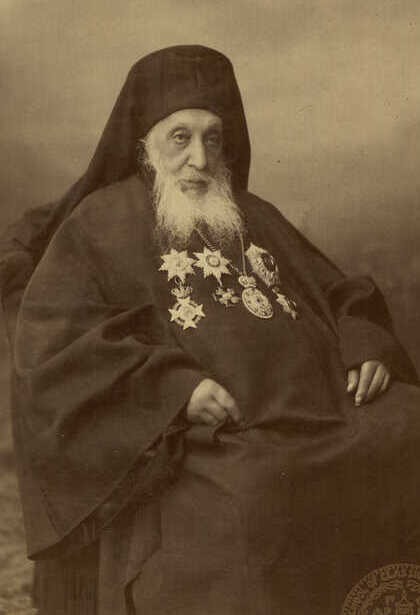
- Portrait of Patriarch Sophronius III of Constantinople, 1892
- Church: Church of Constantinople
- In office: 20 September 1863 – 4 December 1866
- Predecessor: Joachim II of Constantinople
- Successor: Gregory VI of Constantinople

Personal details
- Born: 1802
- Died: 22 August 1899 (aged 96–97)
- Denomination: Eastern Orthodoxy

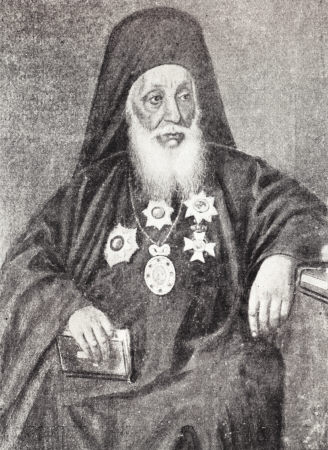
Sophronius III of Constantinople

Sophronius III of Constantinople (Greek: Σωφρόνιος, romanized: Sofronios; 1802 – 22 August 1899) served as Ecumenical Patriarch of Constantinople from 1863 to 1866. He was elected Greek Patriarch of Alexandria on 30 May 1870. He served there as Sophronius IV until his death on 22 August 1899. He established the Holy Church of the Transfiguration of the Saviour in 1888 in the city of Port Said. His Alexandrian patriarchate was marked by unfair expulsion of Nectarios of Aegina, who was later elevated to sainthood.

Eastern Orthodox Church titles
Preceded by Joachim II	Ecumenical Patriarch of Constantinople; 1863 – 1866	Succeeded by Gregory VI (2)

Preceded by Nilus	Greek Patriarch of Alexandria; 1870–1899	Succeeded by Photius
