= Nymfasia =

Nymfasia Νυμφασία
- Community
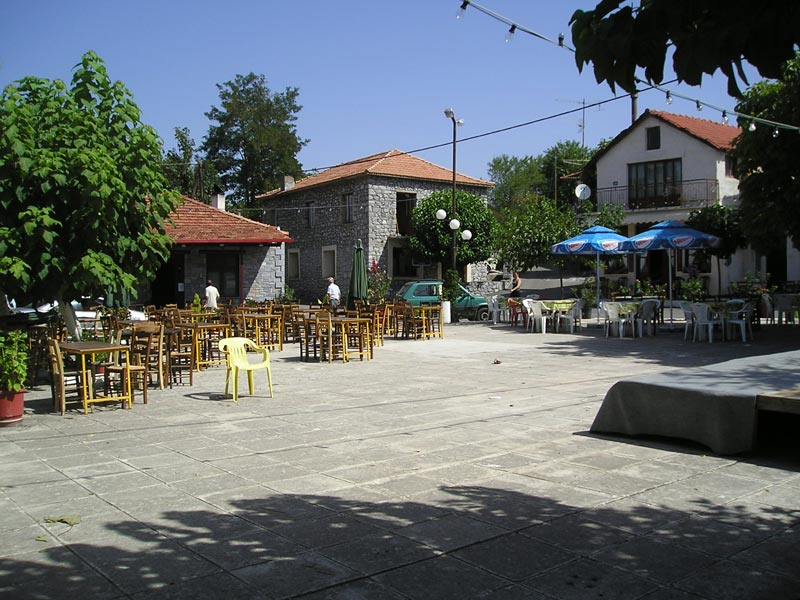
- Nymfasia, Arcadia, square

- Location within Greece
- Coordinates: 37°41.5′N 22°11′E
- Country: Greece
- Administrative region: Peloponnese
- Regional unit: Arcadia
- Municipality: Gortynia
- Municipal unit: Vytina

Population (2021)
  - Community: 114
- Time zone: UTC+2 (EET)
  - Summer (DST): UTC+3 (EEST)

Nymfasia (Greek: Νυμφασία, before 1927: Γρανίτσα - Граница(Bulgarian)) is a village in the municipal unit of Vytina, Arcadia, Greece. It sits at 1,000 m above sea level, at the foot of the Mainalo mountains. It is 2 km north of Vytina and 10 km west of Levidi.

== Population ==
| Year | Population |
|---|---|
| 1981 | 271 |
| 1991 | 247 |
| 2001 | 251 |
| 2011 | 114 |
| 2021 | 114 |

== See also ==
- List of settlements in Arcadia
