= Vasileios Oikonomidis =

Greek law professor

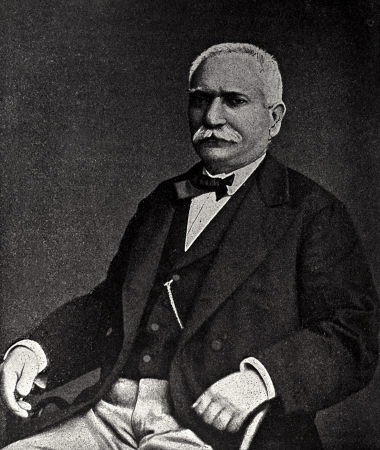
Vasileios Oikonomidis

Vasileios Oikonomidis (Greek: Βασίλειος Οικονομίδης; Vytina, Gortnynia, 1814 – 1894) was a major Greek law professor of the 19th century.

== Sources ==
- Λεύκωμα της εκατονταετηρίδος της Εν Αθήναις Αρχαιολογικής Εταιρείας 1837 - 1937. Athens: Αρχαιολογική Εταιρεία. 1937.
- National and Kapodistrian University of Athens, ed. (1937). Εκατονταετηρίς 1837 - 1937, Πινακοθήκη. Athens: Πυρσός Α.Ε.
