= Palaiopyrgos =

Human settlement in Arcadia, Greece

Palaiopyrgos Παλαιόπυργος
- Community
- Location within Greece
- Coordinates: 37°42′43″N 22°20′46″E
- Country: Greece
- Administrative region: Peloponnese
- Regional unit: Arcadia
- Municipality: Tripoli
- Municipal unit: Levidi

Population (2021)
  - Community: 132
- Time zone: UTC+2 (EET)
  - Summer (DST): UTC+3 (EEST)

Palaiopyrgos (Greek: Παλαιόπυργος, "Old Tower", before 1957: Μποντιά – Bontia or Bodia) is a village in the municipal unit Levidi, Arcadia in Greece. Its mediaeval name was Bodia or Bodea. It is best known as the source of the syrtos botiakos, a popular variety of the syrtos dance.

== History ==
The village's mediaeval name Bodia is thought to be derived from the Slavic word boda, meaning "winter quarters" (usually for sheep). (The Peloponnese was invaded by Slavic nomads who ruled some areas from the seventh to ninth centuries CE; even after the restoration of Byzantine rule, some of these tribes retained their Slavic identity into Byzantine times). Even today, the neighbourhood of Palaiopyrgos contains Slavic toponyms.

The first written reference to the village appears in a Venetian chronicle dated 1704, in which it is called "Bodea". An earlier reference in a Frankish chronicle dated 1205 refers to a "Pyrgos, on Mount Trachy," which may be Palaiopyrgos. The village, protected by its eponymous tower and local militia, fell to the Turks in 1715, during the last Turkish-Venetian War. The first reference to the village in the Greek language is a document concerning the governor of the area, Rigas Palamides, and his rights vis-à-vis Bodia.

The names of numerous villagers are recorded as having fought, many with distinction, in the Greek War of Independence, the Balkan Wars, World War II and the Greek Civil War.
