= Constantius II of Constantinople =

Ecumenical Patriarch of Constantinople from 1834 to 1835

- Ecumenical Patriarch of Constantinople
- Church: Church of Constantinople
- Diocese: Constantinople
- See: Ecumenical Patriarchate
- Installed: 18 August 1834
- Term ended: 26 September 1835
- Predecessor: Constantius I of Constantinople
- Successor: Gregory VI of Constantinople

Personal details
- Born: 1780
- Died: 17 June 1859 (aged 78–79) Arnavutköy, Ottoman Empire
- Denomination: Eastern Orthodox Church

Constantius II of Constantinople (Greek: Κωνστάντιος; 1780 – 17 June 1859) served as Ecumenical Patriarch of Constantinople during the period 1834–1835.

Before his election as Ecumenical Patriarch on 18 August 1834, he had been Metropolitan bishop of Veliko Tarnovo. He wasn't particularly educated, nor did he have administrative skills. So, the next year he had to resign. He retired to Arnavutköy on the Bosphorus, where he died on 17 June 1859. He was buried in the forecourt of the Holy Church of Asomatoi in Arnavutköy.

== Bibliography ==
- Οικουμενικό Πατριαρχείο.
- www.megarevma.net.

Eastern Orthodox Church titles
Preceded by Constantius I	Ecumenical Patriarch of Constantinople; 1834 – 1835	Succeeded by Gregory VI
