= Rheunus =

Village in ancient Arcadia

Rheunus or Rheunos (Ancient Greek: Ῥεῦνος) was a village in the territory of Caphyae, in Arcadian Azania in ancient Arcadia, Greece.

Rheunus was the place where the waters from the Orchomenus plain resurfaced as the river Tragus.
