= Nenita =

Nenita Νένητα
- Community
- Location within Greece
- Coordinates: 38°14′N 26°06′E
- Country: Greece
- Administrative region: North Aegean
- Regional unit: Chios
- Municipality: Chios
- Municipal unit: Ionia
- Elevation: 120 m (390 ft)

Population (2021)
  - Community: 930
- Time zone: UTC+2 (EET)
  - Summer (DST): UTC+3 (EEST)
- Postal code: 821 02
- Area code: 22710
- Vehicle registration: ΧΙ

Nenita (Greek: Νένητα) is a town in Ionia, Chios, Greece. It is located in the south-east Chios, 17 km south of Chios (town). Nenita belongs to Chios municipality and Ionia municipal unit.

== History ==
Nenita was mentioned by European visitors during the Ottoman period. who described it as a large village. Its name possibly derives from the Greek word neonita (νεώνητα) that means "new buildings". Nenita suffered great damages during destructive earthquake of 1881. Nowadays, Nenita is a big village of South Chios. The residents are employed in agriculture, particularly in the cultivation and production of mastic. Nenita is associated with the icon of Archangel Michael.

=== Historical population ===
Census	Settlement	Community
1991	1,052	
2001	1,038	1,156
2011	903	924
2021	910	930
