= Tragus (river) =

River in Greece

- Native name: Τράγος (Greek)

Location
- Country: Greece

Physical characteristics
- Mouth
  - location: Ladon
  - coordinates: 37.8254°N 22.1274°E

Basin features
- Progression: Ladon→ Alfeios→ Ionian Sea

The Tragus or Tragos (Greek: Τράγος) is a river of northwestern Arcadia and southern Achaea, Greece. It is a left tributary of the Ladon river. Its source is near the village of Nymfasia, it flows along Dara, and joins the Ladon near Zevgolatio.

== Background ==
The ancient author Pausanias wrote that the river issues from the inner side of the embankment surrounding the city of Caphyae near lake Orchomenus, after which it descends into a chasm of the earth, issuing again at a place called Nasi (Νάσοι); and that the name of the village where it issues is named Rheunus (Ῥεῦνος). Older names of the Tragus are Tara and Daraiiko.
