= Anthemius (disambiguation) =

Anthemius was Western Roman emperor from 467 to 472.

Anthemius may also refer to:

- Anthemius (praetorian prefect) (fl. 400–414), Praetorian Prefect of the East and grandfather of the Western Emperor
- Anthemius Isidorus, Consul in 436
- Anthemiolus (after 453–c. 471), son of the Emperor, Roman general
- Procopius Anthemius (son of Anthemius), son of the Emperor and Eastern Roman politician
- Anthemius of Cyprus (fl. 488), archbishop
- Anthemius of Tralles (c. 474–before 558), architect of Hagia Sophia
- Anthemius of Novgorod (13th century), more commonly known as Onfim, a boy who lived in Novgorod and left his notes on the birch bark

== See also ==
- Anthimus (disambiguation)
