= Agathangelus of Constantinople =

Ecumenical Patriarch of Constantinople from 1826 to 1830

- Ecumenical Patriarch of Constantinople
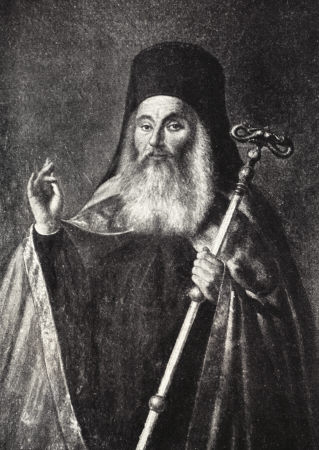
- 1907 depiction of Agathangelus
- Church: Church of Constantinople
- Diocese: Constantinople
- See: Ecumenical Patriarchate
- Installed: 26 September 1826
- Term ended: 5 July 1830
- Predecessor: Chrysanthus of Constantinople
- Successor: Constantius I of Constantinople

Personal details
- Born: 1769 Near Edirne
- Died: 30 November 1831 (aged 61–62) Edirne
- Denomination: Eastern Orthodox Church

Agathangelus of Constantinople (Greek: Ἀγαθάγγελος; 1769 – 30 November 1831) was the leader of the Metropolitanate of Belgrade from 1815 until 1825 when recalled back to Constantinople. There he was elected Ecumenical Patriarch of Constantinople during the period 1826–1830.

== Biography ==
He was born in a village near Edirne, which helped accuse him of being of Bulgarian descent. There he was first educated. He became a monk in the Iviron Monastery of Mount Athos. About 1800 he became a priest of the Greek community of Moscow. In November 1815 he was elected Metropolitan bishop of Belgrade and in August 1825 metropolitan bishop of Metropolis of Chalcedon. On 26 September 1826, after Chrysanthus of Constantinople was deposed and exiled, Agathangelus was elected Patriarch of Constantinople.

He was one of the most educated Patriarchs of his time. He spoke Greek, Turkish, Bulgarian, Russian and French. His reign was associated with certain actions that lowered his prestige and caused heated reactions. The first was his involvement in the Greek War of Independence in 1827 when some of the chieftains of Central Greece asked for his intercession with Sultan Mahmud II so that they would be amnestied. Agathangelus, on the Sultan's order, sent a deputation to the Ioannis Kapodistrias, asking that the Greeks submit to the Sultan, an act which tainted his reputation as anti-ethnic. He was also involved in the election of the Patriarch of Jerusalem, which was attributed to bribery, economical and administrative instabilities, leading to his deposition on 5 July 1830.

After that, he was exiled to Kayseri and later to Edirne, where he died on 30 November 1831.

== Bibliography ==
- Kiminas, Demetrius (2009). The Ecumenical Patriarchate - A History of Its Metropolitanates with Annotated Hierarch Catalogs. Wildside Press. ISBN 9781434458766.
- Radosavljević, Nedeljko V. (2018). "Belgrade Metropolitanate 1825–1831". Belgrade 1521–1867. Belgrade: The Institute of History. pp. 297–313. ISBN 9788677431327.
- Radosavljević, Nedeljko V. (2020). "Kyrillos, the Metropolitan of Belgrade (1825–1827)" (PDF). Bulgarian Historical Review. 48 (1–2): 73–93. Archived (PDF) from the original on 13 October 2022.
- Οικουμενικό Πατριαρχείο.
- Encyclopedia Papyrus Larousse Britannica, 2007, vol. 1, p. 152.

Eastern Orthodox Church titles
| Preceded by Chrysanthus | Ecumenical Patriarch of Constantinople; 1826 – 1830 | Succeeded by Constantius I |
