= Gabriele Dara =

Albanian politician and writer (1826–1885)

- Dara on a 2023 stamp of Albania
- Born: 8 January 1826; Palazzo Adriano, Province of Palermo, Kingdom of the Two Sicilies
- Died: 15 November 1885 (aged 59); Agrigento, Sicily, Italy
- Occupations: lawyer, publisher, politician, and poet
- Writing career
- Period: 1856–1880
- Genre: Poetry
- Notable work: The last song of Bala (Albanian: Kënka e sprasme e Balës)
- Movement: Albanian National Awakening

Gabriele Dara the Younger (8 January 1826 – 15 November 1885), commonly known as Gavril Dara Junior (Albanian: Gavril Dara i Riu, Italian: Gabriele Dara il Giovane), was an Arbëreshë politician and poet of the 19th century. He is regarded as one of the early writers of the Albanian National Awakening.

== Life ==
Gabriele Dara was born on 8 January 1826 in Palazzo Adriano, a town in Sicily, southern Italy. His family was one of the first to migrate from Albania to Italy after Skanderbeg's death. They migrated from the region of Rrjoll, northern Albania, Malësia. They also migrated to Greece where they named their settlement Dara after their own surname. His grandfather Gabriele Dara the Elder was among the first collectors of Arbëreshë folklore, while his father Ndre or Andrea published a dictionary of folkloric terms.

At an early age he learned Latin and Ancient Greek. In Palermo he received a degree in law and practiced in Agrigento. After the unification of Italy he held a variety of offices in Sicily. At first he served as the first councilor of the prefecture of Palermo and from 1867 to 1869 as governor of Trapani, a town in western Sicily. From 1871 to 1874 he was the director of the liberal political magazine The Reform (Italian: La Riforma). He died on 15 November 1885 in Agrigento.

== Work ==
His early works include verse in the Italian language and a poem in Arberesh dedicated to Saint Lazarus. Dara's best-known work is Kënka e sprasme e Balës (The last song of Bala) originally written in Arbëresh language and later translated into Italian. Kënka e sprasme e Balës is a four-part epic romantic ballad containing nine cantos and recounts the adventures of Nik Peta and Pal Golemi, two Albanian heroes that lived in the era of the League of Lezhë. It was first published in 1887 after his death in installments in the periodical Arbri i ri (Young Albania), published by Giuseppe Schirò. In July 1900 it was fully published in Arbëresh and Italian in the journal La Nazione albanese (The Albanian Nation).
