= Methydrio =

Methydrio Μεθύδριο
- Settlement
- Location within Greece
- Coordinates: 37°39′N 22°10′E
- Country: Greece
- Administrative region: Peloponnese
- Regional unit: Arcadia
- Municipality: Gortynia
- Municipal unit: Vytina
- Community: Pyrgaki

Population (2021)
  - Total: 8
- Time zone: UTC+2 (EET)
  - Summer (DST): UTC+3 (EEST)

Methydrio (Greek: Μεθύδριο, before 1927: Νεμνίτσα - Nemnitsa) is a village in the municipal unit of Vytina, Arcadia, Greece. It sits at 1,060 m above sea level, at the foot of the Mainalo mountains. It is 4 km south of Vytina. It was named after the ancient city Methydrium, the remains of which have been discovered near the village.

== Population ==
Year	Population
1991	45
2001	14
2011	11
2021	8

== History ==
Ancient Methydrion was a city of ancient Arcadia. According to Pausanias it was founded by Orchomenus, son of Lycaon. In the 2nd century AD, it was not a city anymore, but a village belonging to Megalopolis. It was situated between the rivers Maloetas and Mylaon. It had a temple to Poseidon. The remains of ancient Methydrion have been excavated in 1910.

== See also ==
- List of settlements in Arcadia
