= Grammatiko, Pella =

Grammatiko Γραμματικό
- Community
- Location within Greece
- Coordinates: 40°42′25″N 21°53′36″E
- Country: Greece
- Geographic region: Macedonia
- Administrative region: Central Macedonia
- Regional unit: Pella
- Municipality: Edessa
- Municipal unit: Vegoritida

Population (2021)
  - Community: 172
- Time zone: UTC+2 (EET)
  - Summer (DST): UTC+3 (EEST)

Grammatiko (Greek: Γραμματικό, before 1927: Γραμματίκοβον – Grammatikovon) is a community in Pella regional unit, Macedonia, Greece. It consists of two villages: Kato Grammatiko and the smaller Ano Grammatiko.

In the 1800s, the village, then known as "Gramatikovo" has a mixed population of Muslim Turks and hellenophile Christian Bulgarians. In 1845, Russian slavist Victor Grigorovich described Gramatikovo as a Bulgarian village. In 1900, Bulgarian ethnographer Vasil Kanchov recorded the population of the village as 480 Christian Bulgarians and 300 Mulsim Turks.

According to the Secretary of the Bulgarian Exarchate, Dimitar Mishev (D.M. Brancoff), the entire Christian population of Gramatikovo in 1905, or 640 souls, were members of the Ecumenical Patriarchate. Per the 1904 statistics of the Sanjak of Serfiğe of the Greek consulate in Elassona, the village had a population of 420 Slavophone Greeks and 250 Turks. During the Struggle for Macedonia, the villagers fought on the Greek side.

The Greek census (1920) recorded 842 people in the village and in 1923 there were 510 inhabitants who were Muslim. Following the Greek–Turkish population exchange, in Kato Grammatikovon there were 31 refugee families from Asia Minor and 27 refugee families from Pontus in 1926. The Greek census (1928) recorded 878 village inhabitants. In 1928 there were 47 refugee families (186 people).

The village has an Ottoman-era two-story, four sided fortification tower (built 17th century) and, in 2002, it was declared a protected monument.

Grammatiko is the birthplace of Chrysanthus of Constantinople, Ecumenical Patriarch of Constantinople from 1824 to 1826.
