= Joachim IV of Constantinople =

Ecumenical Patriarch of Constantinople from 1884 to 1886

- Ecumenical Patriarch of Constantinople
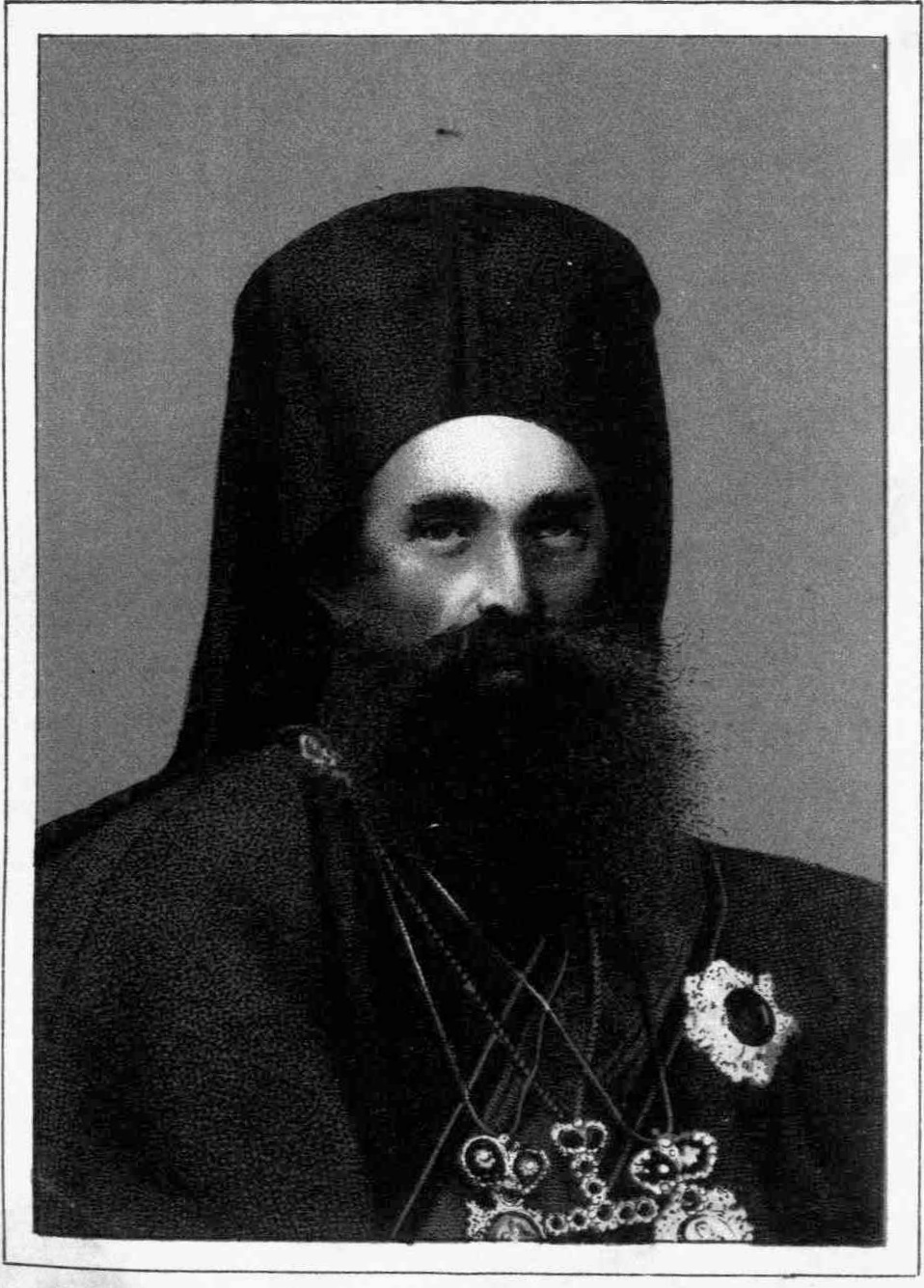
- Church: Church of Constantinople
- Installed: 1 October 1884
- Term ended: 14 November 1886
- Predecessor: Joachim III of Constantinople
- Successor: Dionysius V of Constantinople
- Other posts: Metropolitan of Larisa, Metropolitan of Derkoi

Personal details
- Born: Nikolaos Krousouloudis; 5 July 1837 Kallimasia, Chios, Ottoman Empire
- Died: 15 February 1887 (aged 49) Kallimasia, Chios, Ottoman Empire
- Denomination: Eastern Orthodoxy

Joachim IV of Constantinople (Greek: Ἰωακείμ; 5 July 1837 – 15 February 1887) was Ecumenical Patriarch of Constantinople from 1884 to 1886.

He was born Nikolaos Krousouloudis in Kallimasia on the island of Chios. He was the son of Ioannis Krousouloudis and his wife Lemonia Kokkodi, who was the sister of Patriarch Joachim II of Constantinople. When he was young, his family moved to Constantinople.

Nikolaos studied at the Theological School of Chalki from which he graduated in 1861. He was ordained a deacon and named Joachim, in honour of his uncle. He was then appointed undersecretary of the Holy Synod and, from 31 January 1863, its chief secretary.

On 28 November 1870, Joachim was elected Metropolitan of Larissa. On 8 August 1875, while his uncle was Patriarch, he was transferred to the Metropolis of Derkoi. Several times he was sent on ecclesiastical missions to Mount Athos. He served as president of committees and institutions, and in 1880 he laid the foundation stone of the Joakimion Girls' School in Chios on behalf of his uncle.

In 1883 Joachim fell ill with tuberculosis and spent the winter in Palermo, Italy, and in spas in Austria and Bulgaria. During his stay in Italy he also visited Pope Leo XIII, an unprecedented event for the time.

On 1 October 1884 Joachim was elected Patriarch of Constantinople and enthroned a week later. During his Patriarchate, the autocephaly of the Romanian Orthodox Church was recognized, the relations of the Patriarchate with the Serbian Orthodox Church and the Romanian Orthodox Church were restored, and St. George's Cathedral was repaired.

As his illness continued to afflict him, Joachim resigned on 14 November 1886. On 5 December of the same year he left for Smyrna and then for his birthplace of Chios, where he died two months later, on 15 February 1887. He was buried behind the Church of the Transfiguration of Kallimasia, Chios, where a magnificent monument was later erected.

== See also ==
- List of ecumenical patriarchs of Constantinople

Eastern Orthodox Church titles
Preceded by Joachim III	Ecumenical Patriarch of Constantinople; 1884 – 1887	Succeeded by Dionysius V
