= Eugenius II of Constantinople =

Ecumenical Patriarch of Constantinople from 1821 to 1822

- Ecumenical Patriarch of Constantinople
- Church: Church of Constantinople
- In office: 10 April 1821 – 27 July 1822
- Predecessor: Gregory V of Constantinople
- Successor: Anthimus III of Constantinople

Personal details
- Born: c. 1780
- Died: 27 July 1822
- Denomination: Eastern Orthodoxy

Eugenius II of Constantinople (Greek: Εὐγένιος; c. 1780 – 27 July 1822) was the Ecumenical Patriarch of Constantinople from 1821 until his death in 1822. Prior to his election as Patriarch, he was Archbishop of Anchialos in Bulgaria.

Eugenius II was among the Archbishops held as hostages by Mahmud II along with Gregory V of Constantinople when the Greek War of Independence broke out in 1821. On 10 April 1821, Gregory V was deposed and hanged by the Ottomans in the central gate of the Ecumenical Patriarchate. Archbishop Eugenius II, still a prisoner at the time, was elected as the new Patriarch under the name Eugenius II.

== Notes and references ==
Eastern Orthodox Church titles
| Preceded by Gregory V (3) | Ecumenical Patriarch of Constantinople; 1821 – 1822 | Succeeded by Anthimus III |
