= Caphyae =

City of ancient Arcadia

Coordinates: 37°45′52″N 22°15′28″E

Caphyae or Kaphyai (Ancient Greek: Καφύαι) was a city of ancient Arcadia situated in a small plain, northwest of the lake of Orchomenus. It was protected against inundations from this lake by a mound or dyke, raised by the inhabitants of Caphyae. The city is said to have been founded by King Cepheus of Tegea, the son of Aleus, and pretended to be of Athenian origin.

Caphyae subsequently belonged to the Achaean League, and was one of the cities of the league, of which Cleomenes III obtained possession. In its neighborhood a great battle was fought in 220 BC, in which the Aetolians, gained a decisive victory over the Achaeans and Aratus of Sicyon. The name of Caphyae also occurs in the subsequent events of this war.

Strabo speaks of the town as in ruins in his time; but it still contained some temples when visited by Pausanias (l. c.). The remains of the walls of Caphyae are visible upon a small insulated height at the village of Chotoussa, which stands near the edge of the lake. Polybius, in his description of the battle of Caphyae, refers to a plain in front of Caphyae, traversed by a river, beyond which were trenches (τάφροι), a description of the place which does not correspond with present appearances. The τάφροι were evidently ditches for the purpose of draining the marshy plain, by conducting the water towards the Katavóthra, around which there was, probably, a small lake. In the time of Pausanias we find that the lake covered the greater part of the plain; and that exactly in the situation in which Polybius describes the ditches, there was a mound of earth.

It is probable that during the four centuries that elapsed between the battle of Caphyae and the visit of Pausanias, a diminution of population should have caused a neglect of the drainage which had formerly ensured the cultivation of the whole plain, and that in the time of the Roman Empire an embankment of earth had been thrown up to preserve the part nearest to Caphyae, leaving the rest uncultivated and marshy.

Pausanias says that on the inner side of the embankment there flows a river, which, descending into a chasm of the earth, issues again at a place called Nasi (Νάσοι); and that the name of the village where it issues is named Rheunus (Ῥεῦνος). From this place it forms the perennial river Tragus (Τράγος) (modern Tara or Daraiiko). He also speaks of a mountain named Cnacalos (Κνάκαλος) (modern Kastania) in the neighbourhood of the city, on which the inhabitants celebrate a yearly festival to Artemis Cnacalesia.

Its site is located near the modern Chotoussa.
