= Greek National Road 74 =

Trunk road in Greece

National Road 74
- Εθνική Οδός 74
- Route of the EO74 road, in blue

Route information
- Length: 142.9 km (88.8 mi)
- Existed: 9 July 1963–present

Major junctions
- East end: Tripoli
- West end: Pyrgos

Location
- Country: Greece
- Regions: Peloponnese; Western Greece
- Primary destinations: Tripoli; Levidi; Vytina; Olympia; Pyrgos

Highway system
- Highways in Greece; Motorways; National roads
← EO73	→ EO75

Greek National Road 74 (Greek: Εθνική Οδός 74), abbreviated as the EO74, is a national road in southwestern Greece. The EO74 runs within the Peloponnese, between Tripoli and Pyrgos.

== Route ==
The EO74 is officially defined as an east–west road within the Arcadia and Elis regional units: the EO74 runs between Tripoli in the east and Pyrgos in the west, passing through or near Levidi, Vytina and Olympia.

The EO74 connects with: the EO7, EO39 and EO72 in Tripoli; the EO66 in Levidi; the EO33 near Vlacherna; and the EO9 in Pyrgos.

== History ==
Ministerial Decision G25871 of 9 July 1963 created the EO74 from the old EO54, which existed by royal decree from 1955 until 1963, and followed the same route as the current EO74. Between Tripoli and Levidi, the EO74 follows the historic EO111, which existed from 1928 to 1955.
