= Cyril VII of Constantinople =

Ecumenical Patriarch of Constantinople from 1855 to 1860

- Ecumenical Patriarch of Constantinople
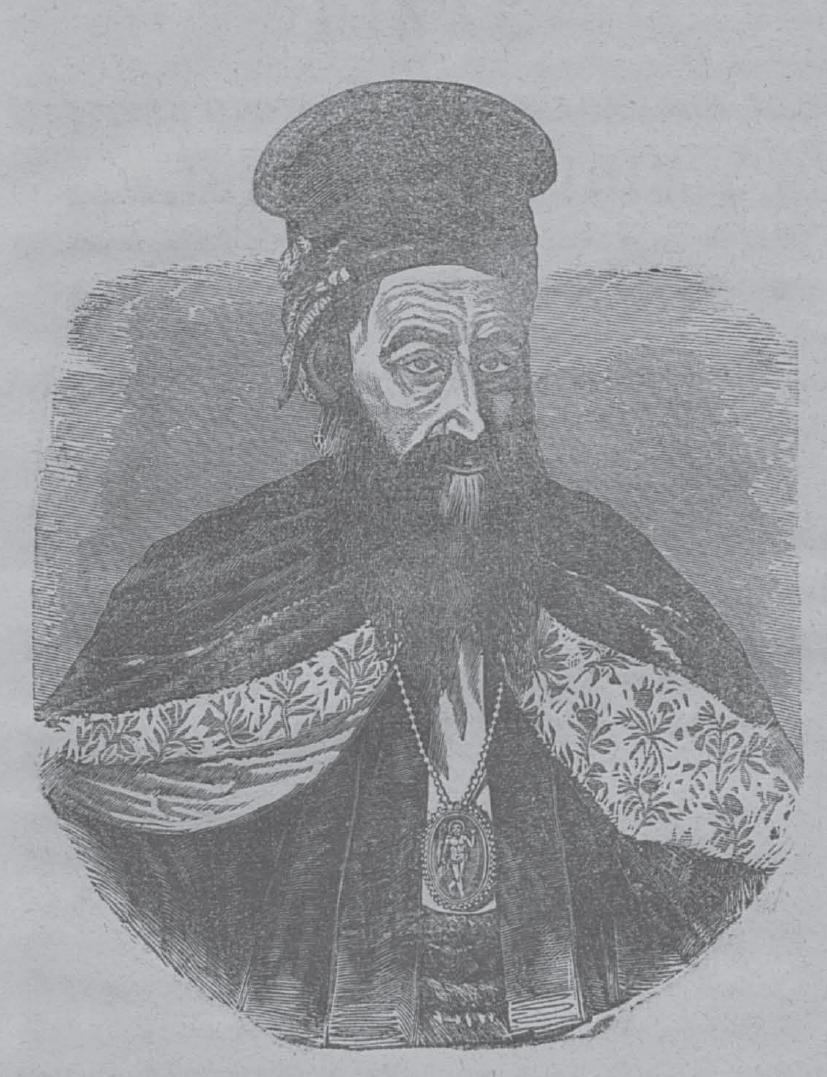
- Church: Church of Constantinople
- In office: 21 September 1855 – 1 July 1860
- Predecessor: Anthimus VI of Constantinople
- Successor: Joachim II of Constantinople

Personal details
- Born: 1800
- Died: 13 March 1872 (aged 71–72) Halki
- Buried: Hagia Triada Church, Constantinople
- Denomination: Eastern Orthodoxy

Cyril VII of Constantinople (Greek: Κύριλλος; 1800 – 13 March 1872) was Ecumenical Patriarch of Constantinople from 1855 to 1860.

His predecessor Anthimus VI of Constantinople was unpopular in the church and the Holy Synod formally petitioned the Ottoman government to depose him; the government agreed and choose the new Patriarch. As such, Cyril VII ascended the Ecumenical throne on 21 September 1855.

He came to power during the Crimean War and witnessed the signing of Sultan Abdulmejid I's Ottoman Reform Edict of 1856 which promised equality in education and justice to everyone, regardless of their religious beliefs.

He was not a well-educated or an energetic person. Nonetheless, he did much for His Church and people. He did his best to raise funds for the victims of an earthquake in the diocese of Prusa. He issued instructions in the sphere of marriage and family life.

Due to the politics of the war, Cyril VII had a lot of enemies. He eventually resigned as Patriarch and spent the rest of his life in prayer and solitude in Halki.

Cyril VII is buried at Hagia Triada Church, Constantinople.

== Notes and references ==
Eastern Orthodox Church titles
Preceded by Anthimus VI (2)	Ecumenical Patriarch of Constantinople; 1855 – 1860	Succeeded by Joachim II
