= Kallimasia =

Kallimasia Καλλιμασιά
- Community
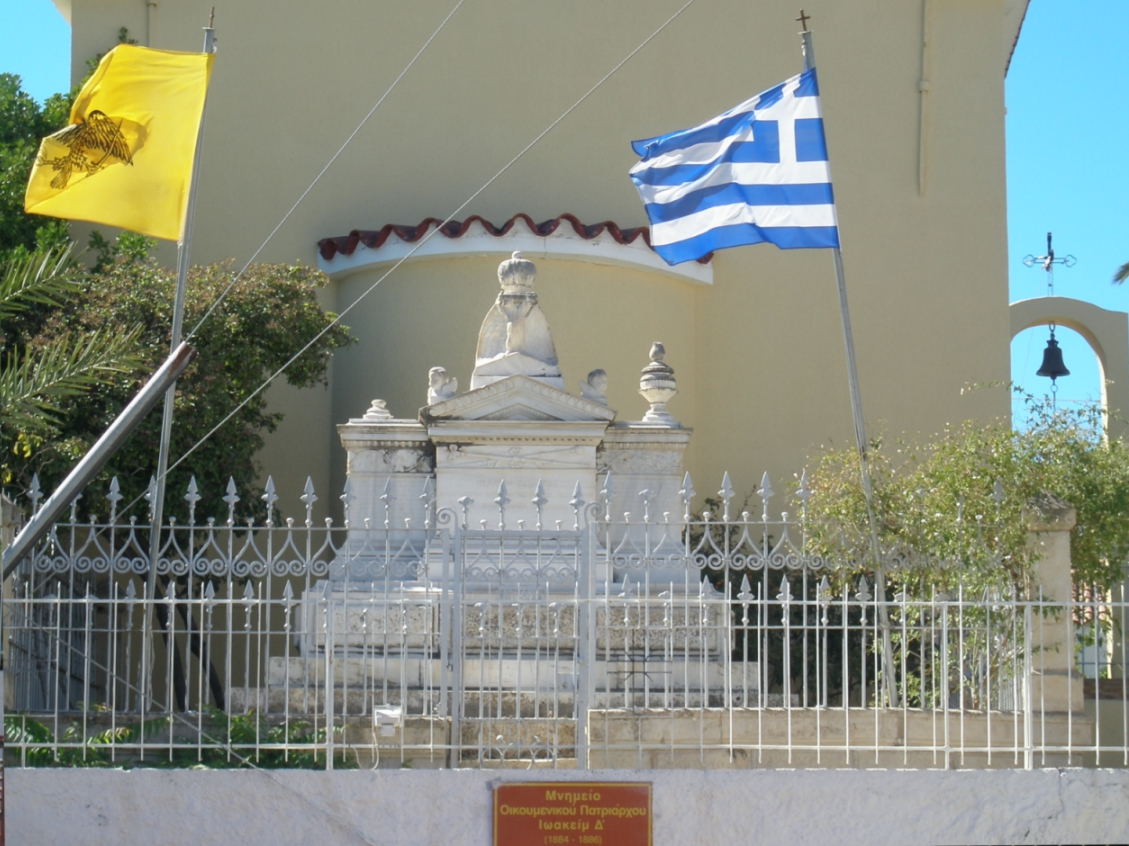
- The grave of Joachim IV behind the church of Transfiguration

- Location within Greece
- Coordinates: 38°18′N 26°06′E
- Country: Greece
- Administrative region: North Aegean
- Regional unit: Chios
- Municipality: Chios
- Municipal unit: Ionia

Population (2021)
  - Community: 987
- Time zone: UTC+2 (EET)
  - Summer (DST): UTC+3 (EEST)

Kallimasia is a town of Chios, built 13 kilometers south of the capital of the island.

It was one of the most important towns of the island during the Middle Ages, it was destroyed, though, almost completely from an earthquake in 1881. It is built in a plain with olive trees. The sights of the region are the ruins of the medieval towers and the churches. Kallimasia has been the seat of Anemonas and Ionia.

From Kallimasia descended two Patriarchs, Joachim II and Joachim IV, the Wing commander Kostas Perrikos, head of PEAN, the founder and first president of the Mastic Producer Association of Chios doctor Georgios Stagkoulis and the champion in discus throw and Olympic medalist Nikolaos Syllas.

In Kallimasia there are the beaches: Agios Ioannis, Monolia and Agios Aimilianos.
