= Joachim II of Constantinople =

Ecumenical Patriarch of Constantinople from 1860 to 1863 and from 1873 to 1878

- Ecumenical Patriarch of Constantinople
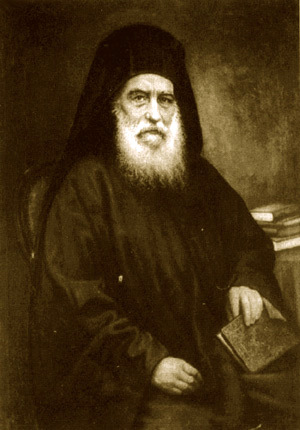
- Church: Church of Constantinople
- Diocese: Constantinople
- See: Ecumenical Patriarchate
- Installed: 4 October 1860; 23 November 1873
- Term ended: 9 July 1863; 4 August 1878
- Predecessor: Cyril VII of Constantinople; Anthimus VI of Constantinople
- Successor: Sophronius III of Constantinople; Joachim III of Constantinople

Personal details
- Born: 1802 Kallimasia of Chios
- Died: 4 August 1878 (aged 75–76) Constantinople
- Buried: Church of St. Mary of the Spring
- Denomination: Eastern Orthodox Church

Joachim II of Constantinople (Greek: Ἰωακείμ; 1802 – 4 August 1878) was Ecumenical Patriarch of Constantinople from 1860 to 1863 and from 1873 to 1878.

== Notes and references ==
Eastern Orthodox Church titles
Preceded by Cyril VII	Ecumenical Patriarch of Constantinople; 1860 – 1863	Succeeded by Sophronius III
Preceded by Anthimus VI (2)	Ecumenical Patriarch of Constantinople; 1873 – 1878	Succeeded by Joachim III
