= Autocephaly =

Eastern Christian hierarchical practice

Autocephaly (/ɔːtəˈsɛfəli/; from Greek αὐτοκεφαλία (autokephalia) 'self-headed') is the status of a hierarchical Christian church whose head bishop does not report to any higher-ranking bishop. The term is primarily used in Eastern Orthodox and Oriental Orthodox churches. The status has been compared with that of the churches (provinces) within the Anglican Communion.

== Overview of autocephaly ==
In the first centuries of the history of the Christian church, the autocephalous status of a local church was promulgated by canons of the ecumenical councils. There developed the pentarchy, i.e., a model of ecclesiastical organization where the universal Church was governed by the primates (patriarchs) of the five major episcopal sees of the Roman Empire: Rome, Constantinople, Alexandria, Antioch, and Jerusalem. The independent (autocephalous) position of the Church of Cyprus by ancient custom was recognized against the claims of the Patriarch of Antioch, at the Council of Ephesus (431); it is unclear whether the Church of Cyprus had always been independent, or was once part of the Church of Antioch. When the Patriarch of Antioch claimed the Church of Cyprus was under its jurisdiction, the Cypriot clergy denounced this before the Council of Ephesus. The Council ratified the autocephaly of the Church of Cyprus. After the Council of Ephesus, the Church of Antioch never again claimed that Cyprus was under its jurisdiction. The Church of Cyprus has since been governed by the Archbishop of Cyprus, who is not subject to any higher ecclesiastical authority.

== Autocephaly in Eastern Orthodoxy ==
In Eastern Orthodoxy, the right to grant autocephaly is nowadays a contested issue, the main opponents in the dispute being the Ecumenical Patriarchate, which claims this right as its prerogative, and the Russian Orthodox Church (the Moscow Patriarchate), which insists that one autocephalous jurisdiction has the right to grant independence to one of its components. Thus, the Orthodox Church in America was granted autocephaly in 1970 by the Moscow Patriarchate, but this new status was not recognized by most patriarchates. During the medieval period, Orthodox empires wanted their church to be "equal" to the state and declare their own patriarchates. In the modern era, the issue of autocephaly has been closely linked to the issue of self-determination and political independence of a nation; self-proclamation of autocephaly was normally followed by a long period of non-recognition and schism with the mother church.

=== Modern-era historical precedents ===
Following the establishment of an independent Greece in 1832, the Greek government in 1833 unilaterally proclaimed the Orthodox church in the kingdom (until then within the jurisdiction of the Ecumenical Patriarchate) to be autocephalous; but it was not until June 1850 that the mother church (i.e. the Ecumenical Patriarchate), under the Patriarch Anthimus IV, recognized this status.

In May 1872, the Bulgarian Exarchate, set up by the Ottoman government two years prior, broke away from the Ecumenical Patriarchate, following the start of the people's struggle for national self-determination. The Bulgarian Church was recognized in 1945 as an autocephalous patriarchate, following the end of World War II and after decades of schism. By that time, Bulgaria was ruled by the Communist party and was behind the "Iron Curtain" of the Soviet Union.

Following the Congress of Berlin (1878), which established Serbia's political independence, full ecclesiastical independence for the Metropolitanate of Belgrade was negotiated and recognized by the Ecumenical Patriarchate in 1879. In the course of the 1848 revolution, following the proclamation of the Serbian Vojvodina (Serbian Duchy) within the Austrian Empire in May 1848, the autocephalous Patriarchate of Karlovci was instituted by the Austrian government. It was abolished in 1920, shortly after the dissolution of Austria-Hungary in 1918 following the Great War. Vojvodina was then incorporated into the Kingdom of Serbs, Croats and Slovenes. The Patriarchate of Karlovci was merged into the newly united Serbian Orthodox Church under Patriarch Dimitrije residing in Belgrade, the capital of the new country that comprised all the Serb-populated lands.

The autocephalous status of the Romanian Church, legally mandated by the local authorities in 1865, was recognized by the Ecumenical Patriarchate in 1885, following the international recognition of the independence of the United Principalities of Moldavia and Wallachia (later Kingdom of Romania) in 1878.

In late March 1917, following the abdication of the Russian tsar Nicholas II earlier that month and the establishment of the Special Transcaucasian Committee, the bishops of the Russian Orthodox Church in Georgia, then within the Russian Empire, unilaterally proclaimed independence of the Georgian Orthodox Church. This was not recognized by the Moscow Patriarchate until 1943, nor by the Ecumenical Patriarchate until 1990.

In September 1922, Albanian Orthodox clergy and laymen proclaimed autocephaly of the Church of Albania at the Great Congress in Berat. The church was recognized by the Ecumenical Patriarch of Constantinople in 1937.

The independent Kyiv Patriarchate was proclaimed in 1992, shortly after the proclamation of independence of Ukraine and the dissolution of the USSR in 1991. In 2018, the Ecumenical Patriarch of Constantinople formally granted the Ukraine Orthodox Church autocephaly by means or a tomos or decree, the most recent grant of formal recognition of autocephaly by the Ecumenical Patriarchate to date. The Moscow Patriarchate, however, did not recognize this grant, and maintains that the continues to have jurisdiction over Ukraine. Some Orthodox churches have not yet recognized Ukraine as autocephalous. In 2018, the problem of autocephaly in Ukraine became a fiercely contested issue and a part of the overall geopolitical confrontation between Russia and Ukraine, as well as between the Moscow Patriarchate and the Ecumenical Patriarchate of Constantinople.

=== Autocephalous and autonomous Eastern Orthodox churches ===
Diagram with the organization of the Eastern Orthodox Church as of 2020

=== Honorary use of the term ===
Within the Patriarchate of Constantinople, the adjective autocephalous was sometimes also used as an honorary designation, without connotations to real autocephaly. Such uses occurred in very specific situations. If a diocesan bishop was exempt from jurisdiction of his metropolitan, and also transferred to the direct jurisdiction of the patriarchal throne, such bishop would be styled as an "autocephalous archbishop" (self-headed, just in terms of not having a metropolitan).

Such honorary uses of the adjective autocephalous were recorded in various Notitiae Episcopatuum and other sources, mainly from the early medieval period. For example, until the end of the 8th century, bishop of Amorium was under the jurisdiction of metropolitan of Pessinus, but was later exempt and placed under direct patriarchal jurisdiction. On that occasion, he was given an honorary title of an autocephalous archbishop, but with no jurisdiction over other bishops, and thus no real autocephaly. Sometime later (c. 814), metropolitan province of Amorium was created, and local archbishop gained regional jurisdiction as a metropolitan, still having no autocephaly since his province was under supreme jurisdiction of the Patriarchate of Constantinople.

== See also ==
- Anglican province
- Autonomy (Eastern Orthodoxy)
- Catholic particular churches
- Congregationalist polity
- Eastern Orthodox Church organization
- Episcopal polity
- Timeline of autocephaly of Eastern Orthodox churches
