= Meletius III of Constantinople =

Ecumenical Patriarch of Constantinople in 1845

- Ecumenical Patriarch of Constantinople
- Church: Church of Constantinople
- In office: 18 April – 28 November 1845
- Predecessor: Germanus IV of Constantinople
- Successor: Anthimus VI of Constantinople

Personal details
- Born: 1772 Kea, Ottoman Empire
- Died: 28 November 1845 (aged 72–73)
- Denomination: Eastern Orthodoxy

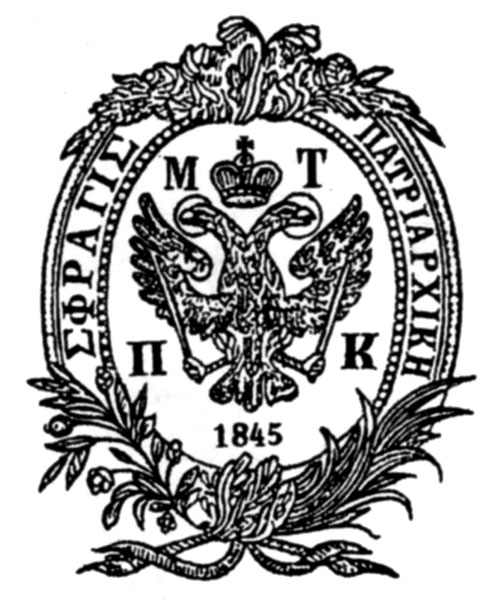
Seal of Meletius III

Meletius III of Constantinople (Greek: Μελέτιος; 1772 - 28 November 1845) was the Ecumenical Patriarch of Constantinople from 18 April 1845 until his death several months later on 28 November. He was born at the island of Kea in 1772.

He was originally known as Meletius of Cyzicus. He succeeded Patriarch Germanus IV, who had resigned under pressure from the Ottoman government; after Meletius’ death, the post went to Anthimus VI.

== Notes and references ==
Eastern Orthodox Church titles
Preceded by Germanus IV	Ecumenical Patriarch of Constantinople; 1845	Succeeded by Anthimus VI
