= Anthimus V of Constantinople =

Ecumenical Patriarch of Constantinople from 1841 to 1842

- Ecumenical Patriarch of Constantinople
- Church: Church of Constantinople
- In office: 6 May 1841 – 12 June 1842
- Predecessor: Anthimus IV of Constantinople
- Successor: Germanus IV of Constantinople

Personal details
- Born: 1779 Raidestos, Ottoman Empire
- Died: 12 June 1842 (aged 62–63)
- Denomination: Eastern Orthodoxy

Anthimus V of Constantinople (Greek: Ἄνθιμος; 1779 – 12 June 1842) was Ecumenical Patriarch of Constantinople for thirteen months from 1841 to 1842. He was born in Raidestos (Tekirdağ) and served as Metropolitan of Agathoupolis between 1815 and 1821, Anchialos between 1821 and 1831, and Kyzikos between 1831 and 1841. He was appointed Ecumenical Patriarch when Anthimus IV of Constantinople was dismissed by Ottoman Sultan Abdülmecid I.

He died in 1842 and was succeeded by Germanus IV of Constantinople.

== Notes and references ==
- Ecumenical Patriarchate: Anthimos V

Eastern Orthodox Church titles
Preceded by Anthimus IV	Ecumenical Patriarch of Constantinople; 1841 – 1842	Succeeded by Germanus IV
