= Dara, Greece =

Dara Δάρα
- Community
- Location within Greece
- Coordinates: 37°48.5′N 22°12.1′E
- Country: Greece
- Administrative region: Peloponnese
- Regional unit: Arcadia
- Municipality: Tripoli
- Municipal unit: Levidi
- Elevation: 670 m (2,200 ft)

Population (2021)
  - Community: 312
- Time zone: UTC+2 (EET)
  - Summer (DST): UTC+3 (EEST)
- Postal code: 220 17
- Area code: 27960
- Vehicle registration: TP

Dara (Greek: Δάρα, also Δάρας - Daras) is a community in the municipal unit of Levidi, northern Arcadia, Greece. It is situated on a mountain slope near the border with Achaea. It is 2 km southeast of Pankrati (Achaea), 5 km northeast of Prasino, 16 km north of Vytina and 16 km northeast of Levidi. The Greek National Road 33 (Patras - Levidi) passes south of the village. Dara has a historical folklore museum displaying the woodcarvings of Giannis Bakopoulos.

== Historical population ==
Year	Population
1981	713
1991	593
2001	474
2011	383
2021	312

The Arvanites historically lived in this village, as it was founded and named by medieval Albanian migrants into the region. The Dara family was one of the first to migrate from Albania to Italy and Greece after Skanderbeg's death. They migrated from the region of Rrjoll, northern Albania, Malësia. They named the village Dara after themselves when they settled here in the Middle Ages.

The Dara family in southern Italy exist as a part of the Arbëreshë community in Palazzo Adriano, a town in Sicily. Gabriele Dara, was an Arbëreshë politician and poet of the 19th century. He is regarded as one of the early writers of the Albanian National Awakening. He was a part of the Dara family of southern Italy which is also related to the Dara family which founded this settlement of Dara.

Arvanitika is not spoken here anymore due to gradual assimilation over time and the population identify as Greeks.

== See also ==
- List of settlements in Arcadia
