= Vytina =

Vytina Βυτίνα
- Municipal unit
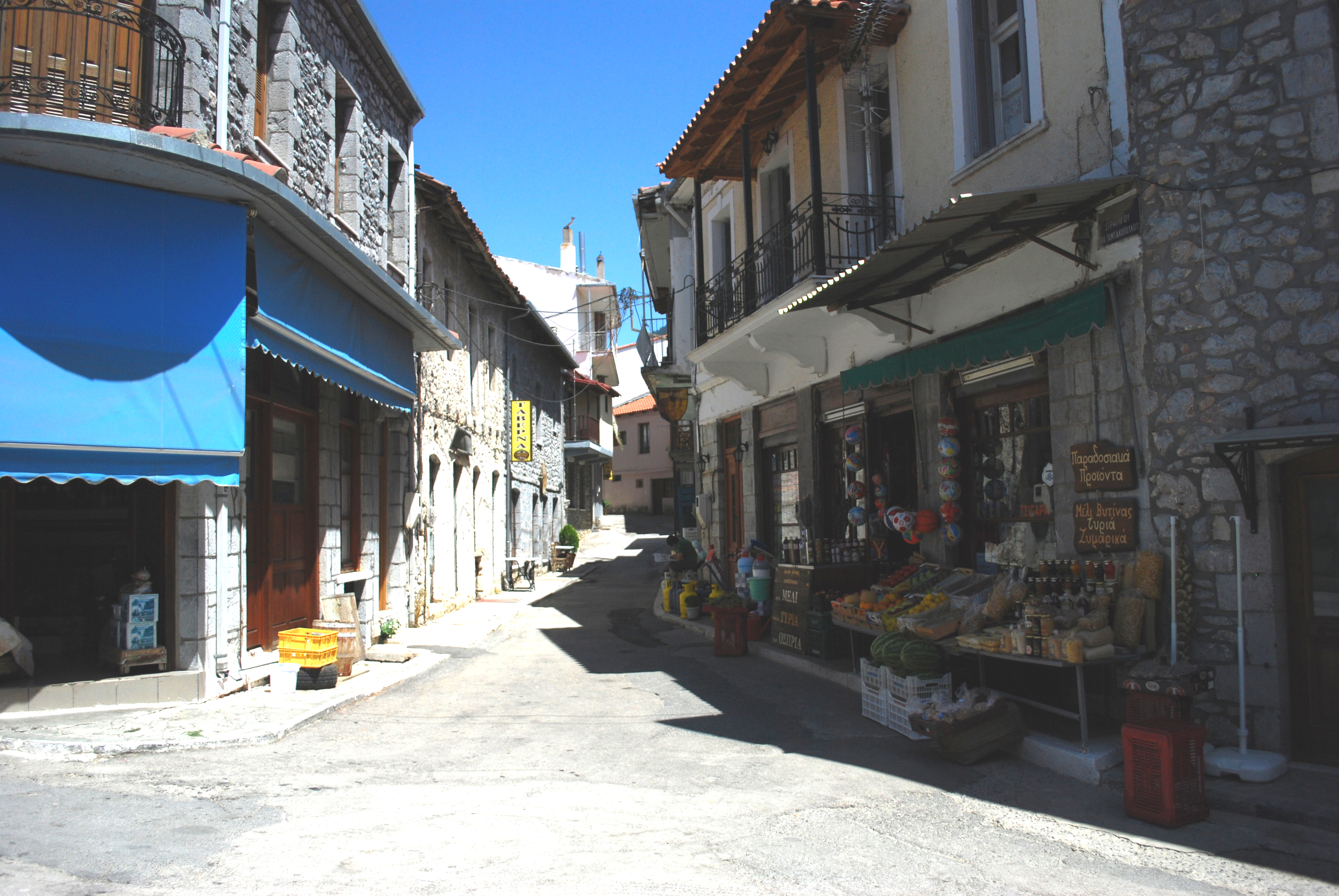

- Location within the regional unit

- Location within Greece
- Coordinates: 37°40′N 22°11′E
- Country: Greece
- Administrative region: Peloponnese
- Regional unit: Arcadia
- Municipality: Gortynia

Area
  - Municipal unit: 139.3 km^{2} (53.8 sq mi)
- Elevation: 1,036 m (3,399 ft)

Population (2021)
  - Municipal unit: 1,036
  - Municipal unit density: 7.437/km^{2} (19.26/sq mi)
  - Community: 561
- Time zone: UTC+2 (EET)
  - Summer (DST): UTC+3 (EEST)
- Postal code: 220 10
- Area code: 27950
- Website: www.dimosvitinas.gr

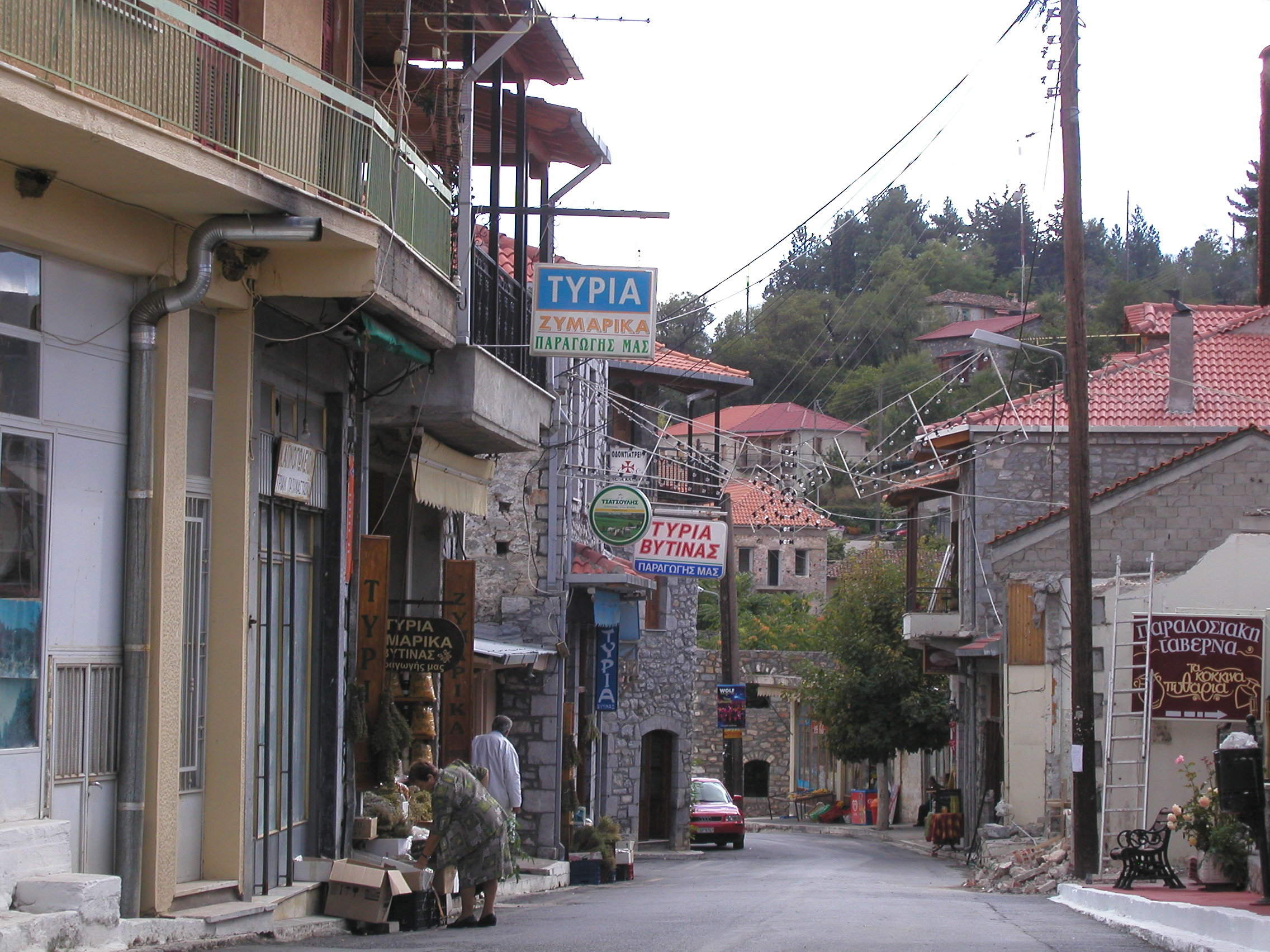
View of the central street in Vytina.

Vytina (Greek: Βυτίνα, Vytína) is a mountain village and a former municipality in Arcadia, Peloponnese, Greece. It is considered a traditional settlement. Since the 2011 local government reform it is part of the municipality Gortynia, of which it is a municipal unit. The municipal unit has an area of 139.309 km^{2}. The seat of the municipality was the village Vytina. The village is located at the foot of the mountain range Mainalo. The area produces marble, a variation called the Black of Vytina. Vytina is 10 km east of Levidi, 15 km northeast of Dimitsana and 24 km northwest of Tripoli. The Greek National Road 74 (Tripoli - Pyrgos) passes through Vytina. The ancient Arcadian city Methydrion was located near Vytina.

== Subdivisions ==
The municipal unit Vytina is subdivided into the following communities (constituent villages in brackets):

- Elati
- Kamenitsa (Kamenitsa, Karvouni)
- Lasta (Lasta, Agridaki)
- Magouliana (Magouliana, Pan)
- Nymfasia
- Pyrgaki (Pyrgaki, Methydrio)
- Vytina (Vytina, Moni Panagias Kernitsis)

== Population history ==
Year	Village	Community	Municipal unit
1981	-	876	-
1991	824	-	1,993
2001	885	999	2,012
2011	652	666	1,116
2021	552	561	1,036

== Climate ==
Due to its altitude and inland location, Vytina has a temperate climate with cold and snowy winters and warm summers with pleasant nights. Precipitation is abundant year round.

Climate data for Vytina (1.013m)
Month	Jan	Feb	Mar	Apr	May	Jun	Jul	Aug	Sep	Oct	Nov	Dec	Year
Mean daily maximum °C (°F)	7.6 (45.7)	10.5 (50.9)	12.7 (54.9)	16 (61)	22.2 (72.0)	26.2 (79.2)	29.3 (84.7)	30.3 (86.5)	25.5 (77.9)	19.8 (67.6)	14.8 (58.6)	9.8 (49.6)	18.7 (65.7)
Mean daily minimum °C (°F)	−1.4 (29.5)	−0.8 (30.6)	0.2 (32.4)	3 (37)	6 (43)	9.8 (49.6)	12.8 (55.0)	13.1 (55.6)	9.7 (49.5)	5.9 (42.6)	3.2 (37.8)	1.6 (34.9)	5.3 (41.5)
Average precipitation mm (inches)	193.3 (7.61)	68.5 (2.70)	83.9 (3.30)	73.5 (2.89)	35 (1.4)	70.7 (2.78)	58.1 (2.29)	54.2 (2.13)	42.2 (1.66)	94.2 (3.71)	113.4 (4.46)	213.9 (8.42)	1,100.9 (43.35)
Source: http://penteli.meteo.gr/stations/vytina/ (2019 – 2021 averages)

== People ==
The father of the historian Constantine Paparrigopoulos, Dimitrios Paparrigopoulos was born in Vytina. Other important Vytiniots include the explorer Panayotis Potagos, the jurist Vasileios Oikonomidis, the provost marshal Ioannis Dimakopoulos, the iconographer Othon Giavopoulos and Kollias Vytiniotis. In 2010 the new park of Vytina was named after Papa-Anypomonos.

== See also ==
- List of settlements in Arcadia
- List of traditional settlements of Greece
