= Anthimus VI of Constantinople =

Three-time Ecumenical Patriarch of Constantinople from 1845 to 1873

- Ecumenical Patriarch of Constantinople
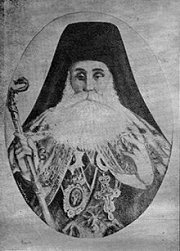
- Church: Church of Constantinople
- In office: 4 December 1845 – 18 October 1848; 24 September 1853 – 21 September 1855; 5 September 1871 – 30 September 1873
- Predecessor: Meletius III of Constantinople; Germanus IV of Constantinople; Gregory VI of Constantinople
- Successor: Anthimus IV of Constantinople; Cyril VII of Constantinople; Joachim II of Constantinople

Personal details
- Born: 1782 Kutali Island
- Died: 18 October 1878 (aged 95–96) Kandilli
- Denomination: Eastern Orthodoxy

Anthimus VI of Constantinople (Greek: Ἄνθιμος; born Ioannides; 1782 – 18 October 1878) was the Ecumenical Patriarch of Constantinople for three periods from 1845 to 1848, from 1853 to 1855 and from 1871 to 1873. He was born in Kutali Island in the Sea of Marmara and died in Kandilli.

Before becoming a Patriarch, Anthimus was a monk at the Esphigmenou monastery in Mount Athos and became metropolitan bishop of Serres (1829), Prussa (1833) and Ephesus (1837). In 1845, he expanded the Katholikon of the monastery, adding two chapels, a vestibule and a porch to it.

He was a signatory to the Encyclical of the Eastern Patriarchs, a reply sent in May 1848 to Pope Pius IX's letter In Suprema Petri Apostoli Sede calling for the Eastern churches to reunite with Rome.

Eastern Orthodox Church titles
| Preceded by Meletius III | Ecumenical Patriarch of Constantinople; 1845 – 1848 | Succeeded by Anthimus IV (2) |
| Preceded by Germanus IV (2) | Ecumenical Patriarch of Constantinople; 1853 – 1855 | Succeeded by Cyril VII |
| Preceded by Gregory VI (2) | Ecumenical Patriarch of Constantinople; 1871 – 1873 | Succeeded by Joachim II (2) |
