= Levidi =

Levidi Λεβίδι
- Municipal unit
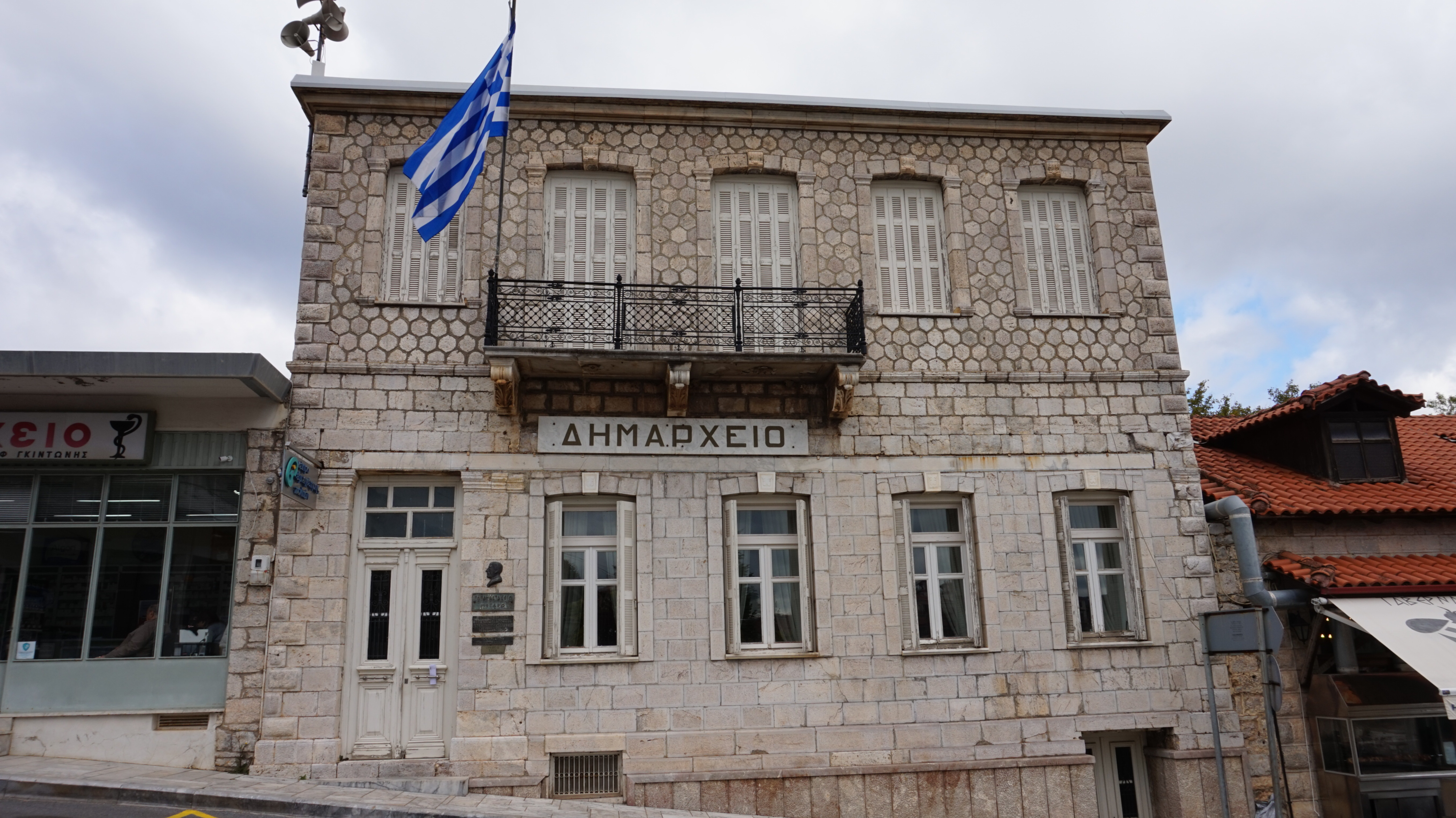
- Town hall of Levidi

- Location within the regional unit

- Location within Greece
- Coordinates: 37°41′N 22°17′E
- Country: Greece
- Administrative region: Peloponnese
- Regional unit: Arcadia
- Municipality: Tripoli

Area
  - Municipal unit: 312.6 km^{2} (120.7 sq mi)
- Elevation: 860 m (2,820 ft)

Population (2021)
  - Municipal unit: 2,753
  - Municipal unit density: 8.807/km^{2} (22.81/sq mi)
  - Community: 920
- Time zone: UTC+2 (EET)
  - Summer (DST): UTC+3 (EEST)
- Postal code: 220 02
- Area code: 27960
- Vehicle registration: TP

Levidi (Greek: Λεβίδι) is a small town and a former municipality in Arcadia, Peloponnese, Greece. Since the 2011 local government reform it is part of the municipality Tripoli, of which it is a municipal unit. The municipal unit has an area of 312.641 km^{2}. The town is situated on the northeastern slope of the Mainalo mountains, at about 850 m elevation. Levidi is 9 km northwest of Kapsas, 10 km east of Vytina, 12 km southwest of Kandila and 20 km northwest of Tripoli. It is at the junction of the Greek National Road 74 (Tripoli–Pyrgos) and the Greek National Road 66 (Levidi - Nemea).

Levidi was the site of several battles during the Greek War of Independence from the Ottoman Empire, and in ancient times was thought to have been the site of a sanctuary to Artemis Hymnia.

The great Greek-Australian rugby league footballer George Peponis has ancestral ties to this town.

== Subdivisions ==
The municipal unit Levidi is subdivided into the following communities (constituent villages in brackets):

- Chotoussa
- Daras
- Kandila (Kandila, Diakopi, Moni Kandilas)
- Kardaras
- Komi
- Levidi
- Limni
- Orchomenos (Orchomenos, Roussis)
- Palaiopyrgos
- Panagitsa
- Vlacherna

== Historical population ==
Year	Community	Municipal unit
1981	1,442	-
1991	1,142	4,334
2001	1,082	3,433
2011	1,025	3,094
2021	920	2,753

== Environment ==
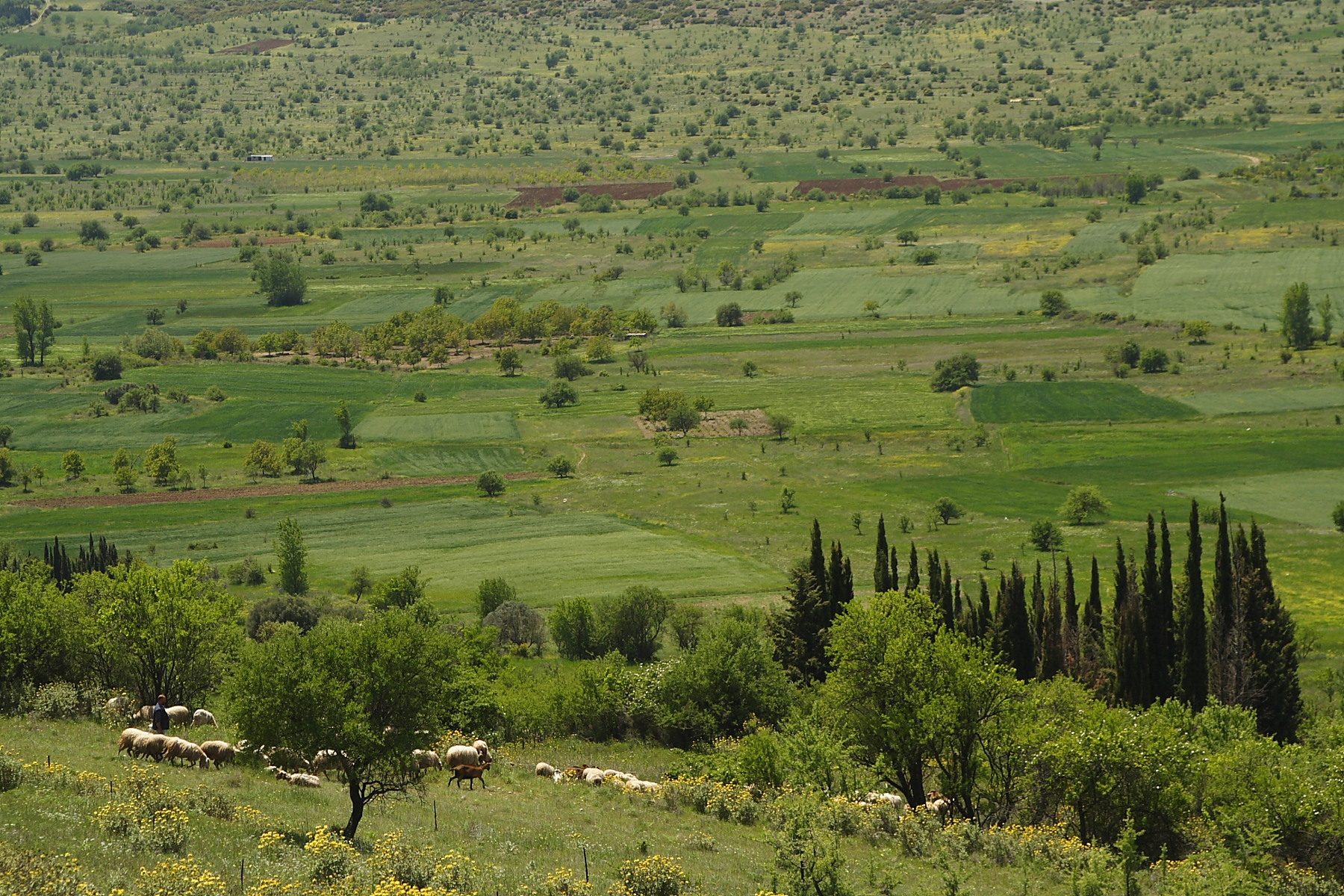
The plateau at the foot of Mainalo, below the town

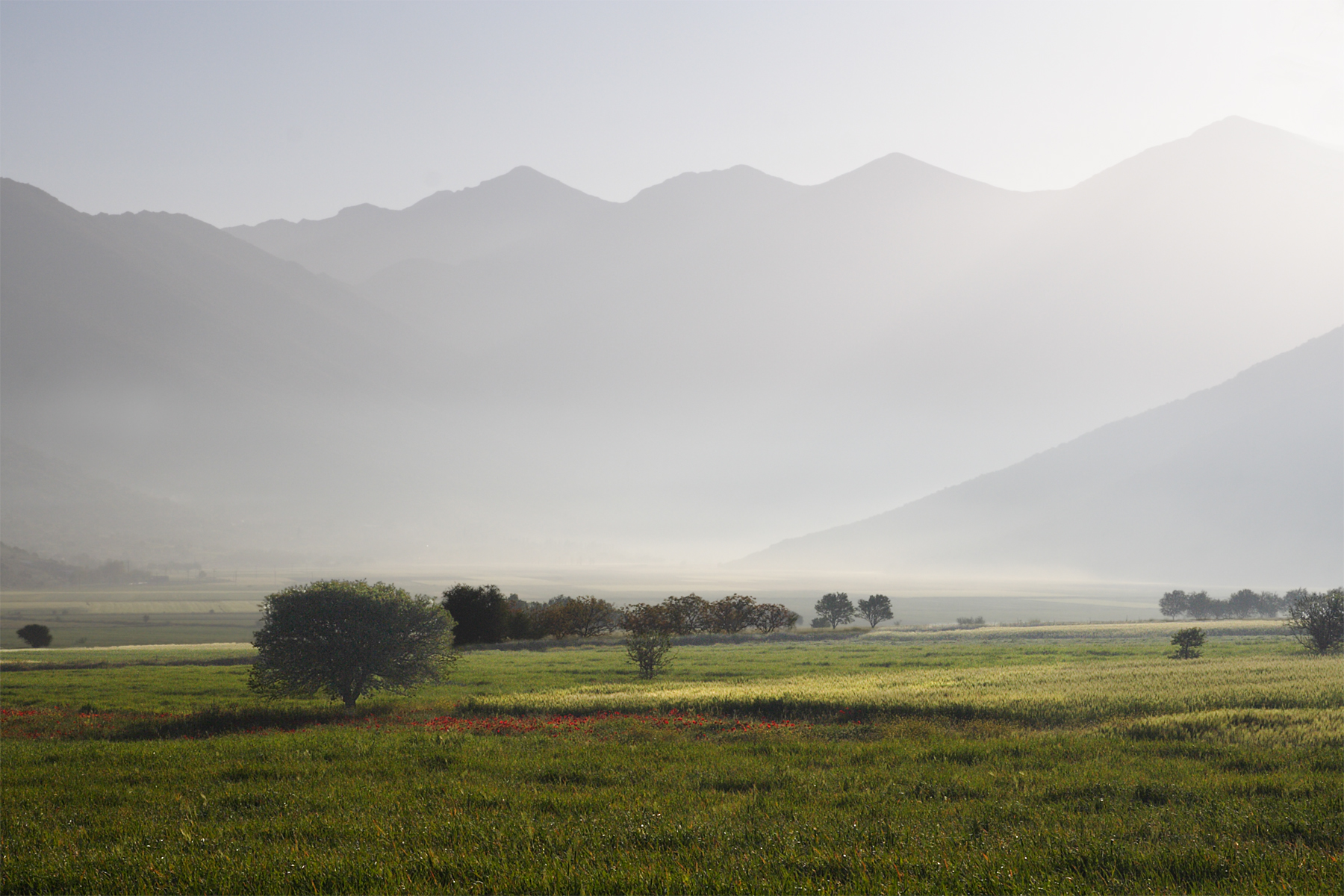
The plateau at the foot of Mainalo, below the town, next to “Σινα Καταβόθρα“ (Sina Ponor), looking towards the Artemisio Mountains on an early morning

From the town’s center The square overlooks Mainalo, Ascension Hill, Mount Artemisio and Helmos. and the huge plain (Οropedio) below. At the other end of the plain below there are abruptly rising mountain ranges. The plain is a closed geological basin of karstic origin. The Mainalo’s slopes are forested. But the landscape of the plain below is grassy and rural. Hills and mountains frame the plain on all sides, they are covered by rock debris (in geology) and shrubs.

== Gallery ==
Church of John the Baptist, Levidi

Square of the Levidi village

== See also ==
- List of settlements in Arcadia
- Ponor
- Karst spring
- Plateau
