= Chrysanthus of Constantinople =

Ecumenical Patriarch of Constantinople from 1824 to 1826

- Ecumenical Patriarch of Constantinople
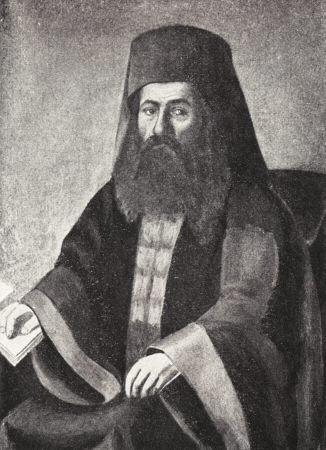
- 1907 depiction of Chrysanthus
- Church: Church of Constantinople
- Diocese: Constantinople
- See: Ecumenical Patriarchate
- Installed: 9 July 1824
- Term ended: 26 September 1826
- Predecessor: Anthimus III of Constantinople
- Successor: Agathangelus of Constantinople

Personal details
- Born: Chrysanthos Manoleas (Χρύσανθος Μανωλέας); 25 February 1768 Dolno Gramatikovo (Grammatiko, Pella), Ottoman Empire
- Died: 10 September 1834 (aged 66) Kayseri, Ottoman Empire
- Buried: Monastery of Christ the Saviour, Prinkipos (modern-day Büyükada)
- Denomination: Eastern Orthodox Church

Chrysanthus of Constantinople (Greek: Χρύσανθος), original surname Manoleas (Μανωλέας; 25 February 1768 – 10 September 1834), was Ecumenical Patriarch of Constantinople during the period 1824–1826.

He was and was born on 25 February 1768 in the village Dolno Gramatikovo, later known as Grammatiko, Pella. He descended from the Manoleas family. He served as metropolitan bishop of Caesarea, Veria, and from 1811 of Serres, a position he held when he was elected Patriarch of Constantinople on 9 July 1824, after the deposition of his predecessor, Anthimus III of Constantinople.

He was a member of the Filiki Eteria. He was educated and arrogant, and made many enemies. He was accused of having an affair with Evfimia, widow of the traitor Asimakis, and for this reason, he was deposed by the Ottomans on 26 September 1826 and was exiled to Kayseri. He died on 10 September 1834 and was buried in the Monastery of Christ the Saviour in the island of Prinkipos, where he resided for the last years of his life.

== Bibliography ==
- Οικουμενικό Πατριαρχείο.
- Χαμχούγιας, Χρήστος, Ο Οικουμενικός Πατριάρχης Κωνσταντινουπόλεως Γρηγόριος ΣΤ' ο Φουρτουνιάδης εν μέσω εθνικών και εθνοφυλετικών ανταγωνισμών, διδακτορική διατριβή, Αριστοτέλειο Πανεπιστήμιο Θεσσαλονίκης (ΑΠΘ), Θεολογική Σχολή, Τμήμα Ποιμαντικής και Κοινωνικής Θεολογίας, 2006.

Eastern Orthodox Church titles
Preceded by Anthimus III	Ecumenical Patriarch of Constantinople; 1824 – 1826	Succeeded by Agathangelus
