= Anthimus IV of Constantinople =

Ecumenical Patriarch of Constantinople from 1840 to 1841 and from 1848 to 1852

- Ecumenical Patriarch of Constantinople
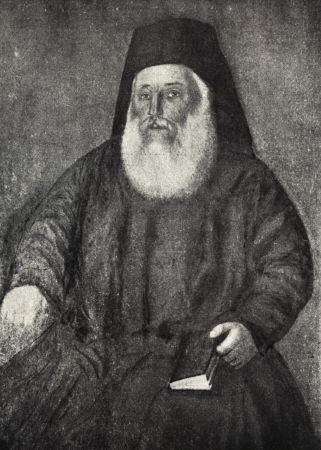
- Church: Church of Constantinople
- In office: 20 February 1840 – 6 May 1841; 18 October 1848 – 30 October 1852
- Predecessor: Gregory VI of Constantinople; Anthimus VI of Constantinople
- Successor: Anthimus V of Constantinople; Germanus IV of Constantinople

Personal details
- Born: 1788 Constantinople, Ottoman Empire
- Died: 1878 (aged 89–90) Princes' Islands, Ottoman Empire
- Denomination: Eastern Orthodoxy

Anthimus IV of Constantinople (Greek: Ἄνθιμος; 1788 – 1878) was twice Ecumenical Patriarch of Constantinople, between 1840 and 1841, and between 1848 and 1852. He was born in Constantinople and served as Chancellor of the Ecumenical Patriarchate before being elected Metropolitan of Ikonion (Konya) between 1825 and 1835, Larissa between 1835 and 1837, and Nikomedeia between 1837 and 1840.

He was elected Ecumenical Patriarch on 20 February 1840, however, was dismissed by Ottoman Empire Sultan Abdülmecid I on 6 May 1841 and withdrew to the Princes' Islands. He was elected again as Ecumenical Patriarch again on 18 October 1848. During his second term, he held secret negotiations with the Church of Greece, which had declared itself autocephalous in 1833. In 1850, he issued a Patriarchal and Synodical Act declaring the autocephaly of the Church of Greece in accordance with canon law.

On 30 October 1852, he was dismissed again and withdrew to the Princes' Islands, where he remained until his death in 1878.

== Notes and references ==
- Ecumenical Patriarchate: Anthimos IV

Eastern Orthodox Church titles
Preceded by Gregory VI	Ecumenical Patriarchs of Constantinople; 1840 – 1841	Succeeded by Anthimus V
Preceded by Anthimus VI	Ecumenical Patriarchs of Constantinople; 1848 – 1852	Succeeded by Germanus IV (2)
