= Patriarchate conflict in Turkey =

The Patriarchate conflict in Turkey was a period of sectarian attacks by followers of the Autocephalous Turkish Orthodox Patriarchate, directed mainly towards the Ecumenical Patriarchate of Constantinople and its interests, as well as a rivalry.

== Background ==
The conflict has its roots in a broader and older movement during the 19th century led by ethnic Turks within the Eastern Orthodox Church, which aimed to end the Greek clerical dominance over ethnic Turkish Orthodox Christians. Many Christian Turks refused the Greek identity and language, emphasising that they were Turkish and not Greek. Because of the tensions, there were increasingly high demands for the establishment of a Turkish Orthodox Church, which would be recognised as autocephalous and offer services in the Turkish language, and intended for ethnic Turks.

Papa Eftim I was an Eastern Orthodox Cleric and a Turkish nationalist, as well as a veteran of the 1919-1922 Greco-Turkish war. He was a friend of Mustafa Kemal Atatürk. Many recommended Eftim I become the Ecumenical Patriarch of Constantinople, and he had the support of the Turkish government. Initially, he claimed that there were "other clergymen more worthy" than himself to become Patriarch, he later changed his views. Eftim I was described as hating everything Greek. For reasons he never stated, Eftim I had a personal resentment towards the Ecumenical Patriarchate of Constantinople. In 1921, he publicised his views, and claimed that the Greek Patriarchs ruled with corruption, and he stated his intentions of becoming the Patriarch. Joined by other clerics, he established the Autocephalous Turkish Orthodox Patriarchate in Kayseri on 15 September 1922, as an alternative to the Ecumenical Patriarchate of Constantinople. Eftim I later stated "I will turn the lights off of the Patriarch in Phanar, and I will do this very fast. Long live the victorious Turkish Army."

== Conflict ==
On 1 June 1923, Eftim I led a raid on the Ecumenical Patriarchate of Constantinople, and assaulted Meletius IV. French military police stationed in the area later intervened and quelled the attack. Meletius IV was left badly injured. Eftim I later proudly spoke about the attack to the public, and called for the resignation of Meletius IV, who he called the "enemy of the Turkish people". On October 2, 1923, Eftim I and his followers, along with some Turkish policemen loyal to his movement, raided the Holy Synod when it was in session, and ordered all clergymen to declare Meletius IV deposed. Out of the eight bishops, six voted in favor of Eftim I while two voted in favor of Meletius IV. After achieving the desired result, Eftim I remained at the Ecumenial Patriarchate until seven new members approved by him were admitted to the Holy Synod. He called for someone who was loyal to Turkey to be elected as Ecumenical Patriarch. Eftim I returned to Ankara, claiming to be the “official representative” of all Orthodox Christian communities. Meletius IV signed his abdication on 20 September 1923, although he did not announce it, as it was during his conflict with Eftim I. The Greek and Turkish governments both pressured Meletius IV to abdicate. The Turkish government also told the Holy Synod to prepare for a new election, and to understand and accept that the next Ecumenical Patriarch of Constantinople must be a Turkish subject elected by Turkish subjects. On December 6, 1923, Gregorios VII was elected Ecumenical Patriarch. Eftim I, who was banned from attending the election, led a group of his followers and raided the Holy Synod and expelled all occupants, declaring that he would continue the occupation and would be the acting Patriarch, until a new election took place in which he approved of the Patriarch. In an open letter to Gregorios VII, he stated "you know that you do not have the confidence of the Government. By accepting the office of Patriarch you have harmed the interests of the community. I advise you to resign." Two days later, the Turkish police returned the building to the Patriarchate. The Minister of Justice stated that the Patriarchate was solely a religious institution and that the Turkish government approved of the election of Gregorios VII. Gregorios VII later publicly pledged his allegiance to the Republic of Turkey, and Mustafa Kemal Atatürk thanked him in a telegraph on Christmas of 1923. In June 1925, the Turkish and Greek governments resolved the conflict over the Ecumenical Patriarchate, and once the situation was stable, Basil III was elected. After the Turkish-Greek conflict over the patriarchate was settled, and the Turkish-Greek peace process, Papa Eftim was seen as a threat to the new peace between Greece and Turkey. On 6 June 1924, in a statement in the Church of Virgin Mary in Galata, Papa Eftim declared that the headquarters of the Turkish Orthodox Patriarchate was moved from Kayseri to Istanbul. He also claimed that the Church of Virgin Mary will become the center of the Patriarchate. In 1926, Papa Eftim gained a second church building in Galata, which he also took from the jurisdiction of the Greek Orthodox Church.

While Atatürk maintained a relationship with Eftim I, the Turkish government did not pay much attention to Eftim I after the death of Atatürk. Alparslan Türkeş had a deep respect for Eftim I and supported him in the conflict over the patriarchate. Türkeş was also interested in the Turkish Orthodox Patriarchate. However, Türkeş was exiled almost immediately after the 1960 coup. In 1953, Eftim I organized a public demonstration against Athenagoras I, and he continued to speak against the Patriarchate. In 1956, he took two more churches in Galata, the Church of Saint Nicholas and the Church of John Chrysostomos.

In 1962, Papa Eftim became sick and passed down his patriarchate to his son Turgut Erenerol, also known as Papa Eftim II. Papa Eftim I, died in 1968, with the Greek Orthodox Church refusing to bury him in the Şişli Greek Orthodox Cemetery. The funeral only happened after the Turkish government intervened. The funeral was attended by many. The successors of Papa Eftim I shared his views, with Papa Eftim II in 1972 stating that the Ecumenical Patriarchate of Constantinople should be removed from Turkey, claiming that there is Orthodox Turks in Turkey and that Greeks served no purpose leading the Patriarchate. Eftim II also claimed that if the Greeks in the Patriarchate would Turkify and abandon their Greek language and identity, he would rejoin the Ecumenical Patriarchate of Constantinople. Sevgi Erenerol, the granddaughter of Eftim I, held hardline nationalistic views described as similar to that of Eftim I. Papa Eftim III emphasised that the Ecumenical Patriarch should not only be a Turkish citizen but an ethnic Turk, and he accused the Greeks in the Patriarchate of plotting against Turkey. Papa Eftim III had ties to the Turkish National Intelligence Organisation (MIT). After Recep Tayyip Erdoğan came to office, his new policies included better relationships between the Turkish government and the Ecumenical Patriarchate of Constantinople, as well as an effort to join the European Union, which caused Papa Eftim III to resign from his position in 2002 and cut ties with the government. He wrote to the AKP government that "the national struggle we waged for 80 years has come to an end. This decision will make the Ecumenical Patriarchate and Greece happy. Now you can also join the European Union."
