= Eftim =

Eftim is a given name. Notable people with the name include:

== People ==
Religion

- Turkish Orthodox Patriarchs of the Autocephalous Turkish Orthodox Patriarchate:
  - Papa Eftim I
  - Papa Eftim II
  - Papa Eftim III
  - Papa Eftim IV

Others

- Eftim Aksentiev (born 1985), Macedonian footballer
- Eftim Angelov known as Timo Angelov, Bulgarian revolutionary
- Eftim Bogoev (born 1980), Macedonian basketball player
- Eftim Gerzilov (born 1952), Bulgarian rower
