= Eftimov =

Eftimov, feminine: Eftimova is a Bulgarian and Macedonian patronymic surname and a patronym derived from the given name Eftim.

- Anka Georgieva (Ani "Anka" Eftimova-Georgieva)
- Georgi Eftimov
- Inna Eftimova
- Kameliya Eftimova
- Nikola Eftimov
- Pande Eftimov
- Yordan Eftimov

== See also ==
- Efimov
