= Dechev =

Dechev (Bulgarian: Дечев) is a surname of Bulgarian origin. Notable people with the surname include:

- Martin Dechev (1990–2024), Bulgarian footballer
- Nikola Dechev (1880–1903), Bulgarian revolutionary
