= Nicholas V (disambiguation) =

Pope Nicholas V (1397–1455) was Pope from 6 March 1447 until his death.

Nicholas V may also refer to:

- Antipope Nicholas V (c. 1260–1333)
- Nicholas V, Duke of Krnov (c. 1409–1452)
- Patriarch Nicholas V of Alexandria, ruled in 1936–39
