= Russian Culture Now =

Non-profit group

Russian Culture Now is a non-profit group based in Chicago that is dedicated to increasing awareness of Russian artists in the United States, especially those in classical music, dance, or opera.

Founded in 2010, the organization hosts receptions for visiting Russian artists, such as Russian choreographer Boris Eifman on April 23, 2011. Russian Culture Now is also known for its scholarship program, which gives out $500 to 10 middle school, high school, and college students who have an interest in either the arts or Russian culture. Russian Culture Now was founded by Aleksandra Efimova, president of Russian Pointe, a brand of ballet pointe shoes.
