= Patriarch Photios =

Patriarch Photios/Photius may refer to:

- Photios I of Constantinople, Ecumenical Patriarch in 858–867 and 877–886
- Patriarch Photius of Alexandria, Greek Patriarch of Alexandria in 1900–1925
- Photios II of Constantinople, Ecumenical Patriarch in 1929–1935
