= Patriarch Christopher of Alexandria =

Patriarch Christopher of Alexandria may refer to:

- Patriarch Christopher I of Alexandria, Greek Patriarch of Alexandria in 817–841
- Patriarch Christopher II of Alexandria, Greek Orthodox Patriarch of Alexandria in 1939–1966
