= Turkish Orthodox Church in the United States =

Independent Eastern Orthodox denomination

The Turkish Orthodox Church in America was an independent Eastern Orthodox denomination active in the 1970s.

It claimed to pay allegiance to the Autocephalous Turkish Orthodox Patriarchate, an unrecognised Orthodox church based in Istanbul.

The Turkish Orthodox Church continued to exist throughout the 1970s, but during the early 1980s, Archbishop Cragg moved to Chicago and opened a health clinic. His stationery carried the title: American Orthodox Church, Diocese of Chicago and North America.
