= Autocephalous Turkish Orthodox Patriarchate =

Christian Orthodox Church based in Turkey

Autocephalous Turkish Orthodox Patriarchate Bağımsız Türk Ortodoks Patrikhanesi
- Type: Eastern Orthodox
- Classification: Independent Eastern Orthodox
- Primate: Papa Eftim IV
- Region: Turkey
- Language: Turkish
- Liturgy: Byzantine Rite
- Headquarters: Meryem Ana Church, Istanbul
- Territory: Turkey, United States
- Founder: Papa Eftim I
- Origin: 1922 in Kayseri
- Independence: 1924
- Recognition: Unrecognized by other Eastern Orthodox churches
- Separated from: Greek Orthodox Church (1922)
- Members: 250 (at its height, pre-1968); Papa Eftim's family (today)

The Autocephalous Turkish Orthodox Patriarchate (Turkish: Bağımsız Türk Ortodoks Patrikhanesi), also referred to as the Turkish Orthodox Church (Turkish: Türk Ortodoks Kilisesi), is an unrecognized autocephalous Eastern Orthodox organization based in Turkey. It was founded in Kayseri by Pavlos Karahisarithis, who became the patriarch and took the name of Papa Eftim I, in 1922. The church is headquartered in Istanbul.

The Patriarchate is unrecognized by other Orthodox Churches and is considered non-canonical. It is seen as a "family business", as "Papa Eftim's church had a very small congregation, and after his death in 1968 it consisted of his family members only". The Patriarchate only makes political declarations in the Turkish press and does not engage in expected church functions like liturgy, religious thought, or spiritual life.

== General Congregation of the Anatolian Turkish Orthodox ==
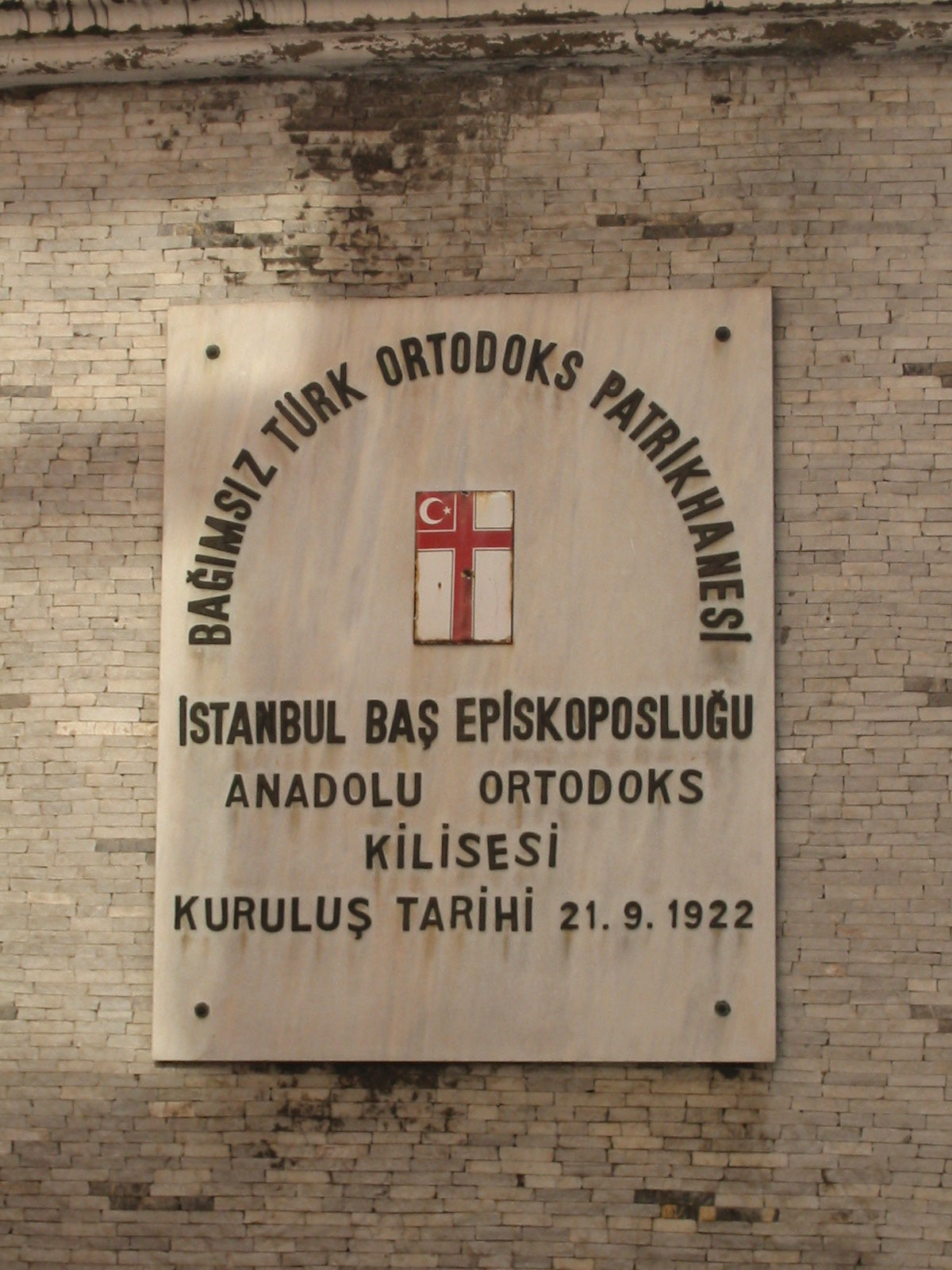
Official insignia of the Autocephalous Turkish Orthodox Patriarchate

The start of the Patriarchate can be traced to the Greco-Turkish War (1919–1922). In 1922 a pro-Turkish Eastern Orthodox group, the General Congregation of the Anatolian Turkish Orthodox (Turkish: Umum Anadolu Türk Ortodoksları Cemaatleri), was set up with the support from the Orthodox bishop of Havza, as well as a number of other congregations representing a genuine movement among the Turkish-speaking, Eastern Orthodox Christian population of Anatolia who wished to remain both Eastern Orthodox and Turkish. There were calls to establish a new Patriarchate with Turkish as the preferred language of Christian worship. Nevertheless, most Turkish-speaking Orthodox Christians remained faithful to the Ecumenical Patriarchate of Constantinople.

== Foundation ==
On 15 September 1922 the Autocephalous Orthodox Patriarchate of Anatolia was founded in Kayseri by Pavlos Karahisarithis, a supporter of the General Congregation of the Anatolian Turkish Orthodox.

The same year, his supporters, with his tacit support, assaulted Patriarch Meletius IV of Constantinople on 1 June 1923.

With a new Ecumenical Patriarch Gregory VII elected on 6 December 1923 after the abdication of Meletius IV, there was another occupation by Papa Eftim I and his followers, when he besieged the Patriarchate for the second time. This time around, they were evicted by the Turkish police.

In 1924, Karahisarithis started to conduct the Christian liturgy in Turkish, and quickly won support from the new Turkish Republic formed after the defeat and dissolution of the Ottoman Empire (1908–1922). The church remains a staunch supporter of the Republic system of Turkey, and the church's spokeswoman vowed to defend it against any threats.

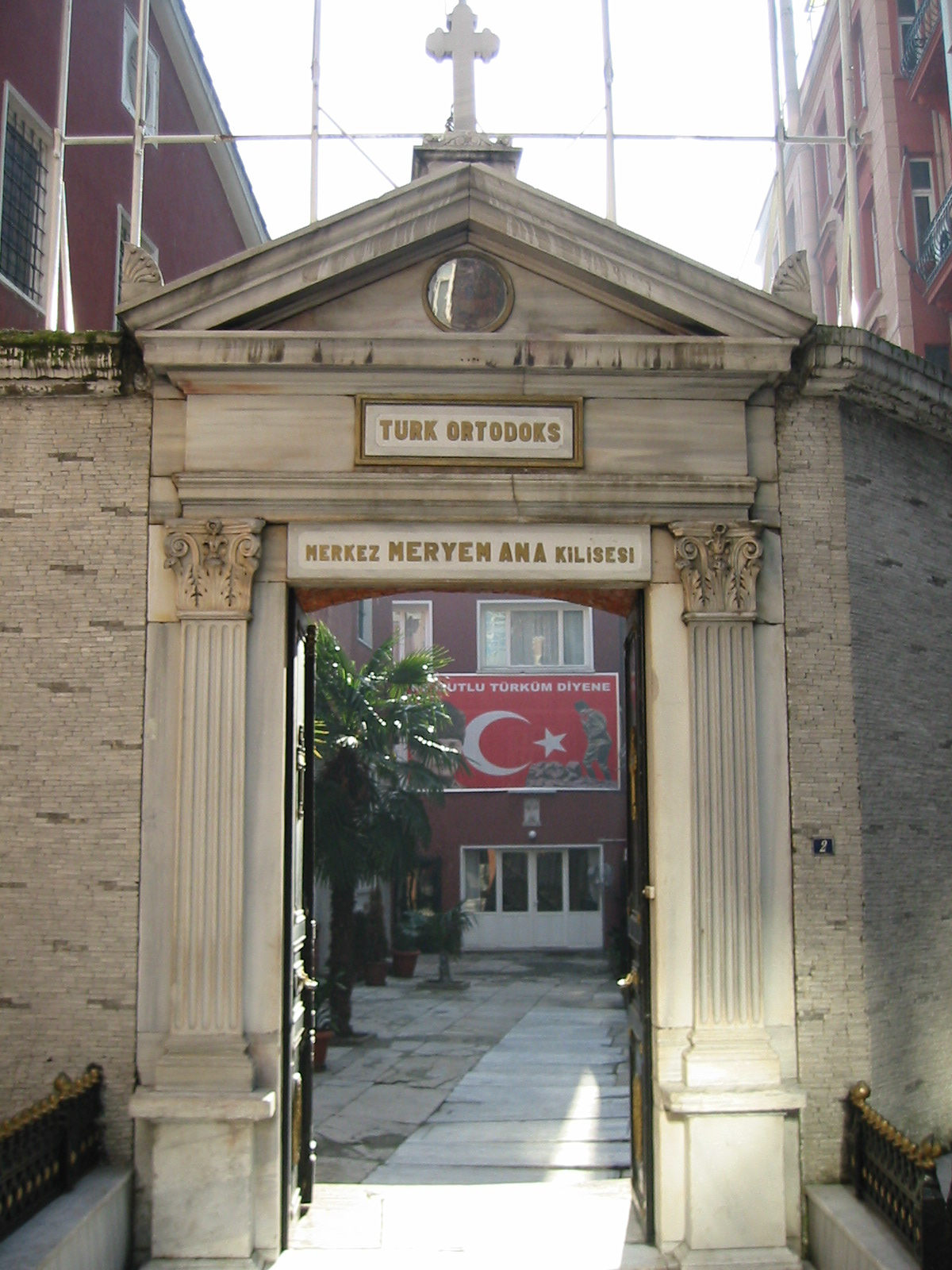
Entrance to the Panagia Kalafatiane (Virgin Mary of Caffa), renamed by the Turkish Patriarchate to "Meryem Ana", Turkish Orthodox Church in Galata, Istanbul

On 6 June 1924, in a conference in the Church of the Virgin Mary (Meryem Ana in Turkish) in Galata, it was decided to transfer the headquarters of the Turkish Orthodox Patriarchate from Kayseri to Istanbul. In the same session it was also decided that the Church of Virgin Mary would become the headquarter of the new Patriarchate of the Turkish Orthodox Church.

Karahisarithis and his family members were exempted from the population exchange as per a decision of the Turkish government.

== Seizure of Greek Orthodox churches and 1964 Expulsion of Greeks ==
The Turkish Patriarchate usurped the Church of Panagia Kalafatiane in 1924, as well as the Church of the Transfiguration of the Saviour in 1926 in Karaköy (Galata). The former Church, during the Ergenekon affair (see below), was used as a storage for ammunition.

When Greeks were forcefully expelled from Turkey in 1964, the Turkish Patriarchate expressed "its pleasure for the expulsion of Greek citizens from Turkey" and further declared that the Ecumenical Patriarchate of Constantinople should be shut down. One year later, in 1965, the Turkish Patriarchate and Papa Eftim, under the auspices of the Turkish state, forcefully occupied and usurped two more churches in Karaköy (Galata), particularly Saint Nicholas and Saint John of the Chiots.

Today, out of these four churches occupied by the Turkish Patriarchate, only two remain unscathed (Panagia Kalafatiane & Saint John of the Chiots). The Church of the Transfiguration of the Saviour was demolished in the 1950s, under the government of Adnan Menderes, whereas the Saint Nicholas Church was destroyed by a fire in 2002 and remains in ruins ever since.

== Alleged links to the Ergenekon affair ==
On 22 January 2008, Sevgi Erenerol, granddaughter of the Autocephalous Turkish Orthodox Patriarchate's founder Papa Eftim I, daughter of Papa Eftim III, and sister of the current primate Papa Eftim IV, was arrested for alleged links with a Turkish nationalist underground organization named Ergenekon. At the time of her arrest, she was the spokeswoman for the Patriarchate. It was also alleged that the Patriarchate served as headquarters for the Ergenekon network. Sevgi Erenerol was well known for her militancy in Turkish nationalist activities, as well as for her antagonism to the Ecumenical Greek Patriarchate and the Armenian Apostolic Church. During the time of Alparslan Türkeş, she had run as a parliamentary candidate for the Nationalist Movement Party (MHP), political arm of the Turkish far-right and ultra-nationalist Grey Wolves paramilitary organization. On August 5, 2013, Sevgi Erenerol was found guilty of involvement in the so-called "Ergenekon conspiracy" and sentenced to life imprisonment. After the retrial she was found not guilty and released on 12 March 2014.

== Attempts of integrating the Gagauz to the church ==
There have been a number of attempts from the 1930s into the 21st century to tie the Turkish Orthodox Patriarchate with the ethnically Turkic, Greek Orthodox Gagauz minority in Bessarabia. A similar project was put into motion in October 2018, when the Turkish president Recep Tayyip Erdoğan visited the Republic of Moldova and toured the Autonomous Territorial Unit of Gagauzia.

However, according to Hungarian theologian James A. Kapalό, "the prospect of any Gagauz clergy abandoning the Moscow Patriarchate in favour of the canonically unrecognised Independent Turkish Orthodox Patriarchate is highly unlikely".

== List of Patriarchs of the Turkish Orthodox Church ==
Deputy Patriarch

- Prokobiyos (1922–1923) – also known as Prokopios Lazaridis and Prokopios of Iconium, was the metropolitan bishop of Konya. He was elected as the deputy patriarch of General Congregation of the Anatolian Turkish Orthodox in 1922. He died in prison on 31 March 1923.

Patriarchs

- Papa Eftim I (1923–1962) – Born name Pavlos Karahisarithis, later changed to Zeki Erenerol. As the founder of the Turkish Orthodox Church, he was awarded the "Medal of Independence", the highest decoration of the Republic of Turkey. Following the death of Prokobiyos, he served as the spiritual leader of the Turkish Orthodox Church until 1926. He was elected as the patriarch in 1926 just after his consecration. He resigned for health reasons in 1962 and died on 14 March 1968.
- Papa Eftim II (1962–1991) – Born name Yorgo, later changed to Turgut Erenerol, elder son of Papa Eftim I. Died on 9 May 1991.
- Papa Eftim III (1991–2002) – Selçuk Erenerol, younger son of Papa Eftim I. He died on 20 December 2002 just weeks after his resignation.
- Papa Eftim IV (2002–present) – Paşa Ümit Erenerol, grandson of Papa Eftim I and son of Papa Eftim III. Current primate of the church.

== Churches ==
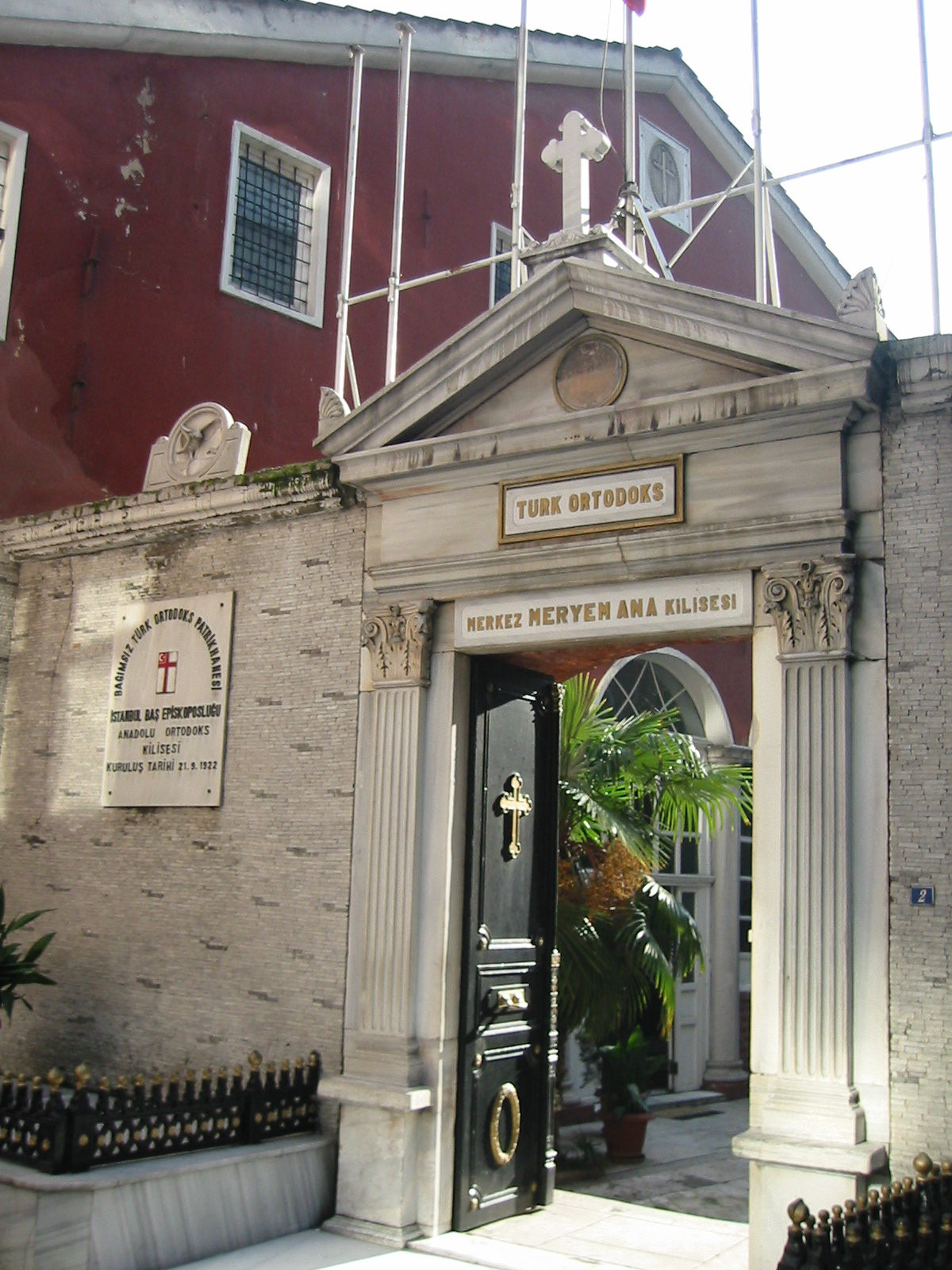
Meryem Ana Church

Today, three churches are owned by Turkish Orthodox Patriarchate and all of them are located in the Karaköy district of Istanbul.

- Meryem Ana Church is the headquarters of the Patriarchate. The church is located at Ali Paşa Değirmen St. 2, Karaköy. It was built in 1583 by Tryfon Karabeinikov, and was known as the Panaiya Church (in Greek Pan-Hagia Kaphatiani) because it was founded by the Crimean Orthodox community of Kaffa. The church underwent a number of fires and several reconstructions with the major one in 1840, the date to which the present construction belongs. The church community left the Ecumenical Patriarchate of Constantinople on March 5, 1924, and adhered to newly found Turkish Orthodox Church. The church's name was changed to Meryem Ana Church (Mother Mary Church) by the Autocephalous Turkish Orthodox Patriarchate in 2006 in honor of Virgin Mary.
- Aziz Nikola Church (in Greek Hagios Nicholaus).
- Aziz Yahya Church (in Greek Hagios Ioannis Prodromos).

In 1924, Eftim I acquired the Hristos Church illegally from the owner, the Ecumenical Patriarchate. Hristos Church was returned to the Ecumenical Patriarchate in 1947, after a legal case, only to be confiscated and bulldozed later on for road enlargement. Compensation for the bulldozed church was paid however to the Erenerol family foundation instead of the Eastern Orthodox community.

== Turkish Orthodox Church in the United States ==
The Turkish Orthodox Church in the United States was an Old Catholic group of 20 predominantly African American churches in the United States loosely linked to the Patriarchate. It formed in 1966 under Christopher M. Cragg, an African American physician. He was consecrated by Papa Eftim II in 1966 with the name of Civet Kristof. It continued to exist throughout the 1970s, but fell away in the early 1980s when Cragg opened a clinic in Chicago.

== See also ==
- Christianity in Turkey
