= Berkovitsa =

- Location of Berkovitsa
- Coordinates: 43°14′N 23°7′E
- Country: Bulgaria
- Province (Oblast): Montana

Government
  - Mayor: Radoslav Naydenov
- Elevation: 371 m (1,217 ft)

Population (01.02.2011)
  - City: 13,463
  - Urban: 18,822
- Time zone: UTC+2 (EET)
  - Summer (DST): UTC+3 (EEST)
- Postal Code: 3500
- Area code: 0953

Berkovitsa (Bulgarian: Берковица [bɛrˈkɔvit͡sɐ]) is a town and ski resort in northwestern Bulgaria. It is the administrative centre of the homonymous Berkovitsa Municipality, Montana Province and is close to the town of Varshets. As of December 2009, it had a population of 13,917.

== Location and history ==
Berkovitsa is situated on the northern slope of Kom Peak of the Berkovska Stara Planina Mountain along the valley of the Berkovitsa River, which is a tributary to the Barziya River, at an altitude above sea level 405 m. The town was mentioned for the first time in Ottoman documents of 1488. According to the 1831 Ottoman population statistics, 67.5% of the Christians were non-taxpayers in the kaza of Berkofça. It is near the site of an old fortified settlement on the road from Sofia to Lom. The remains of the fortress and a church were discovered on high ground at Kaleto, just to the west of the present-day town. The former settlement was known as early as the reign of King Kaloyan and was mentioned as a border settlement in the period of the Vidin Kingdom.

Berkovitsa Glacier, on Livingston Island in the South Shetland Islands, Antarctica, is named for Berkovitsa.

== History ==
The region was involved in the Uprising of Konstantin and Fruzhin (1408 - 1413) and the Chiprovtsi Uprising (1688). At the end of August 1872, Vasil Levski arrived in Berkovitsa, together with the chairman of the Vratsa Revolutionary Committee, Mito Ankov.

== Religion ==
=== Christianity ===
In the late antique fortress Kaleto, located on a hill north of Berkovitsa, a large bishopric complex was built during early Christianity.

- Orthodox church of Nativity of Mary

=== Judaism ===
Until 1947, there was a significant Jewish community in Berkovitsa and there was a functioning synagogue.

== Economy ==
=== Transportation ===
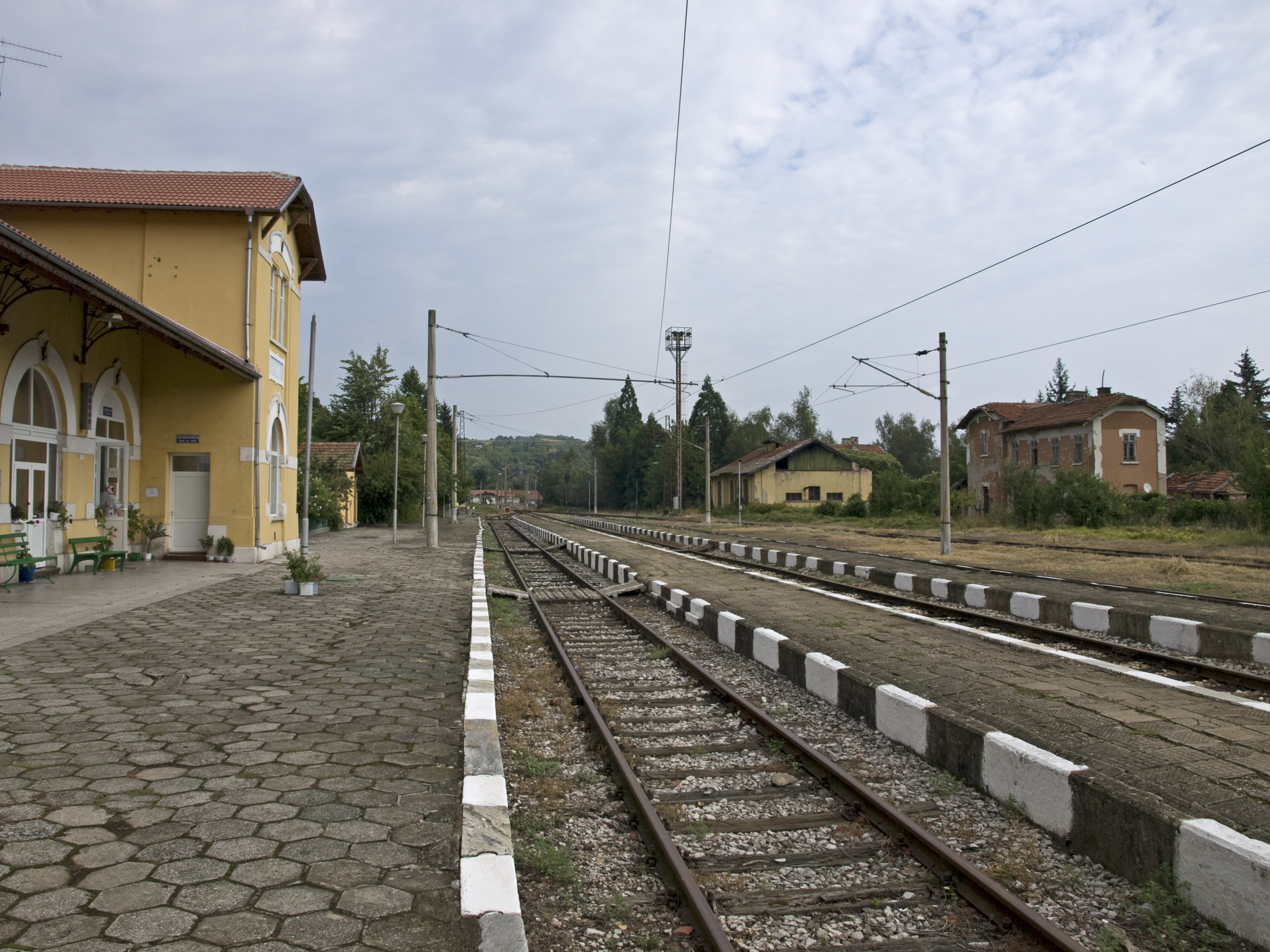
Berkovitsa railway station

Berkovitsa has a terminus railway station. It is connected to Montana and has access to the railway connecting Vidin and Vratsa. There are four trains per day.

== International relations ==
=== Twin towns — Sister cities ===
Berkovitsa is twinned with:

- Dzerzhinsky, Russia
- Zaječar, Serbia
- Dimitrovgrad, Serbia

== Gallery ==
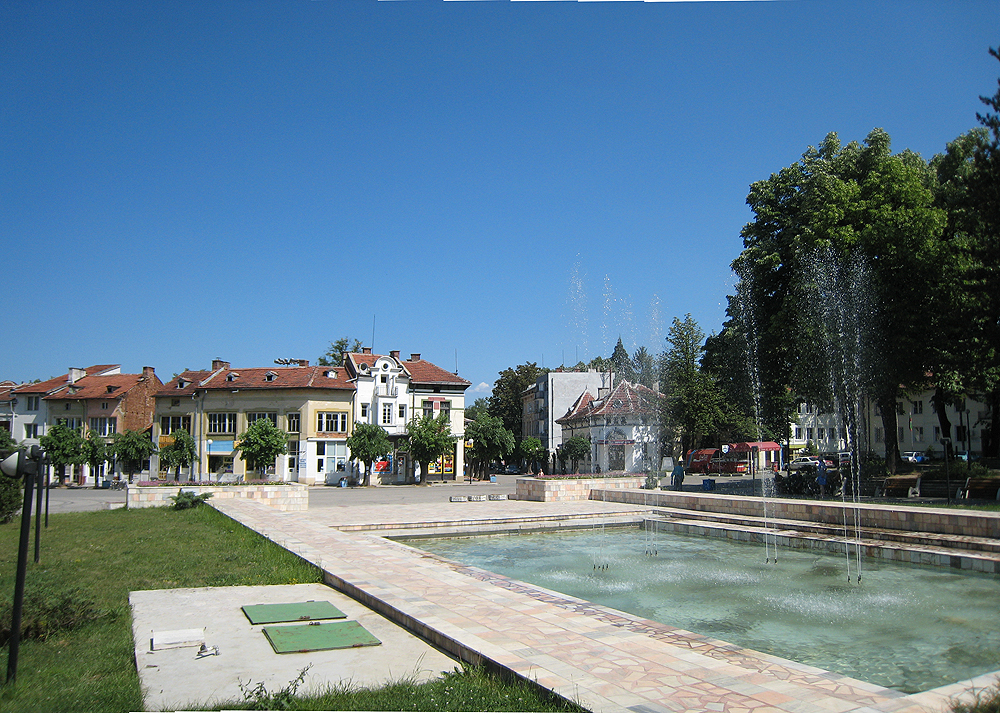
Berkovitsa Square

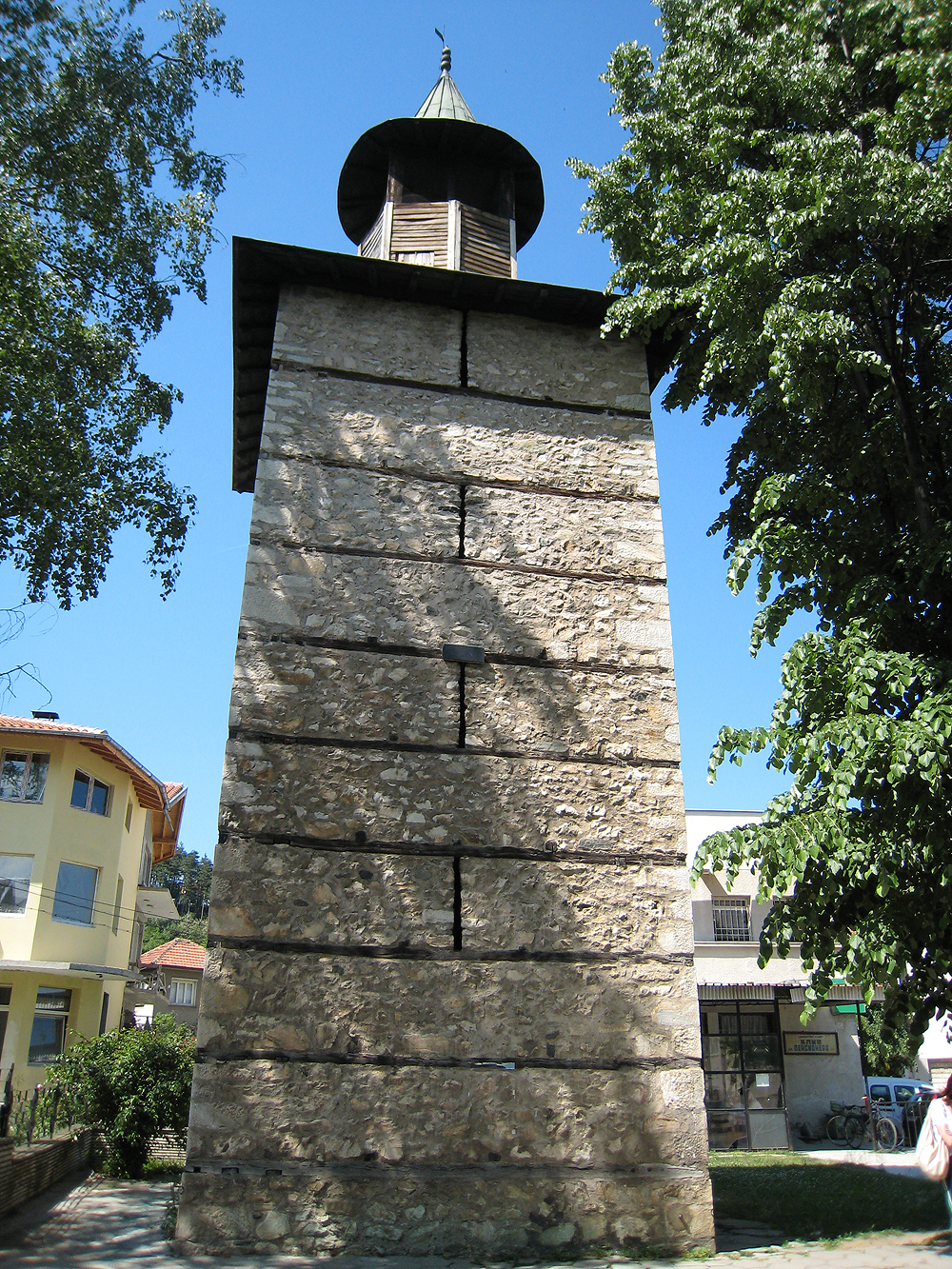
Clock tower

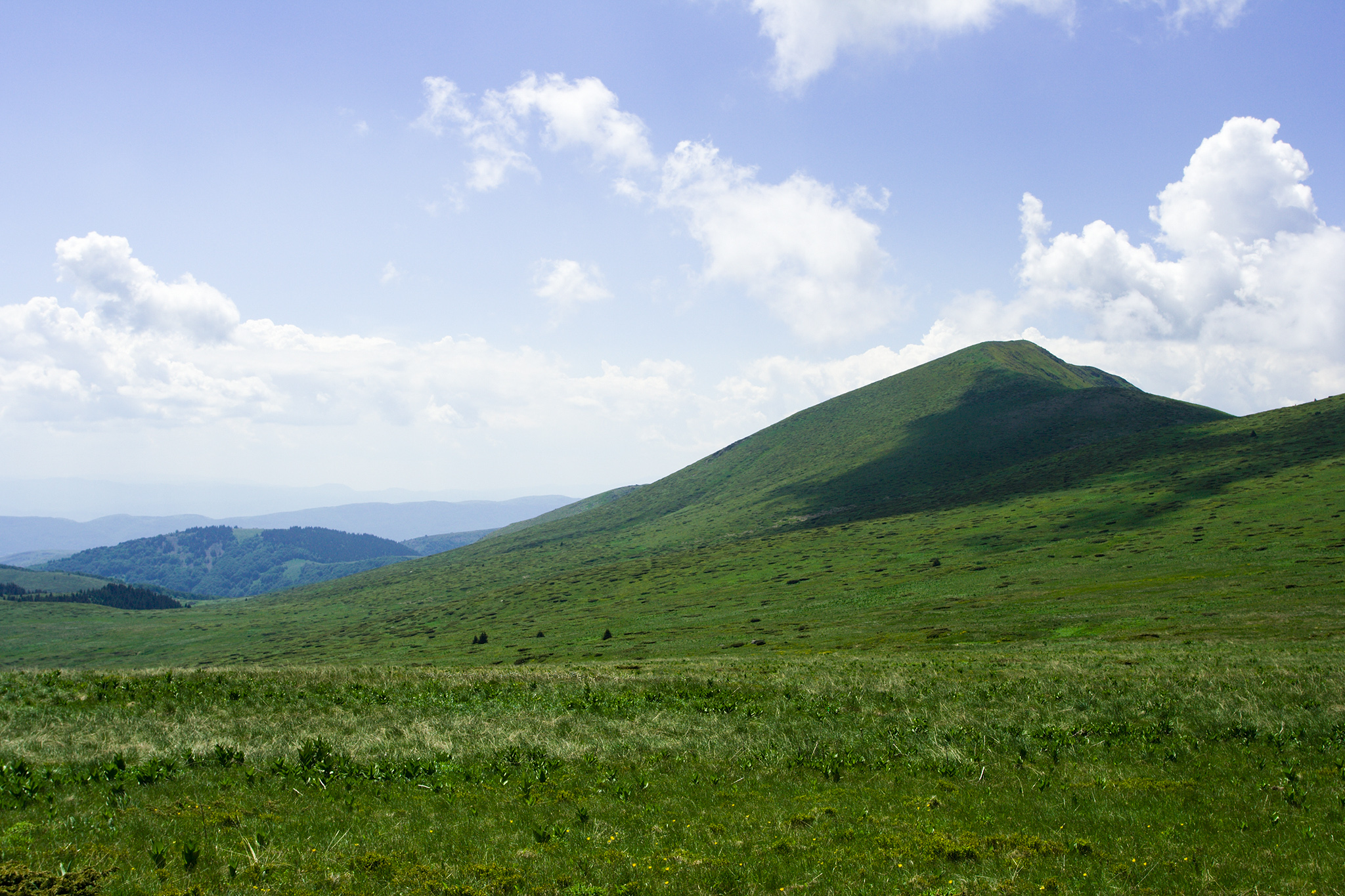
peak Kom

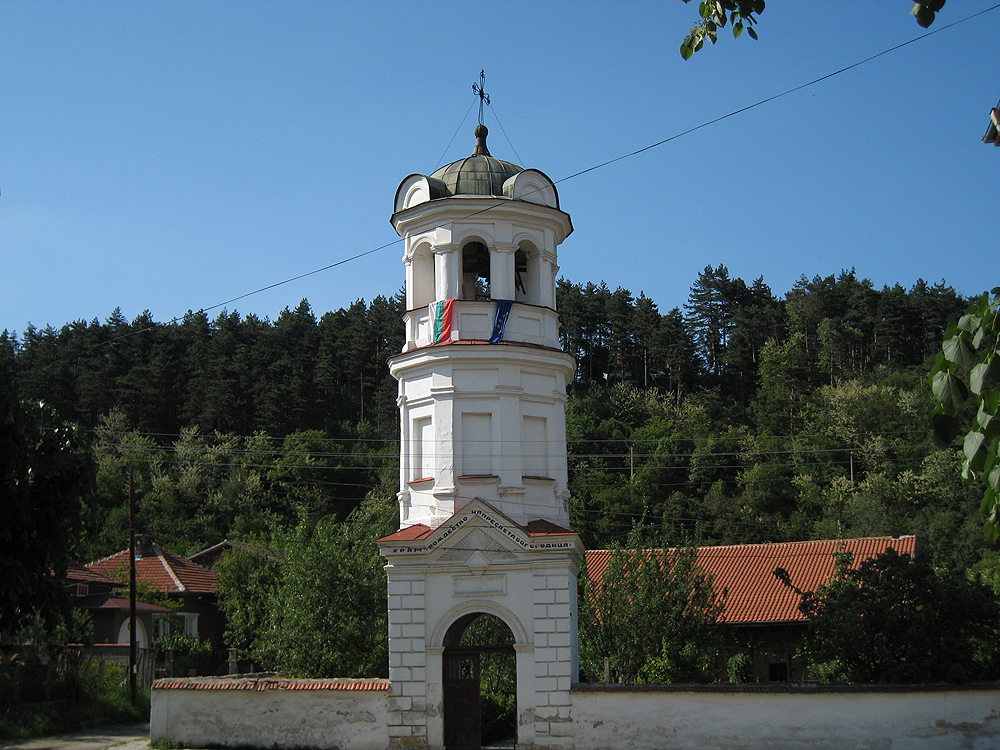
Orthodox Church

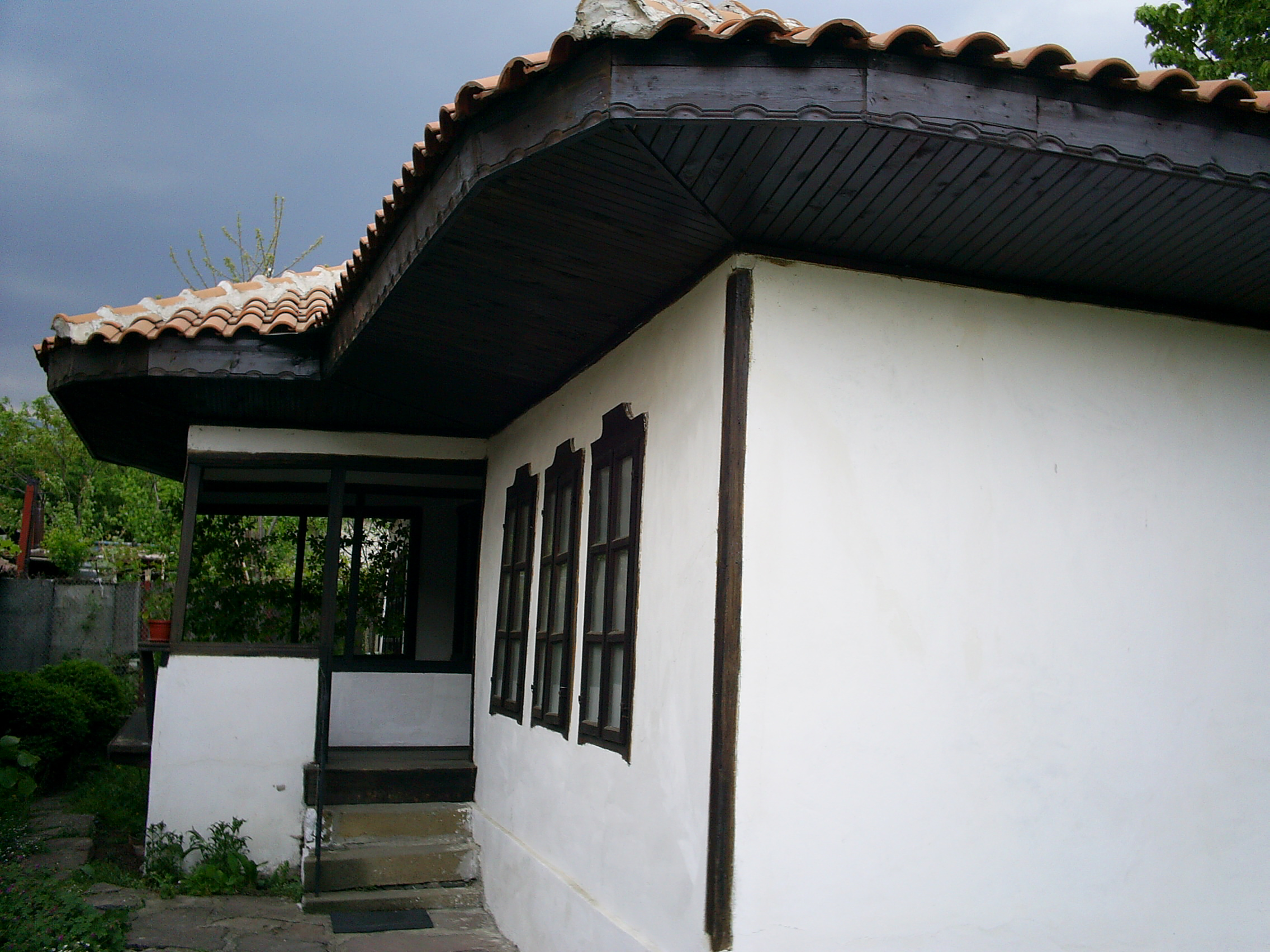
Town museum

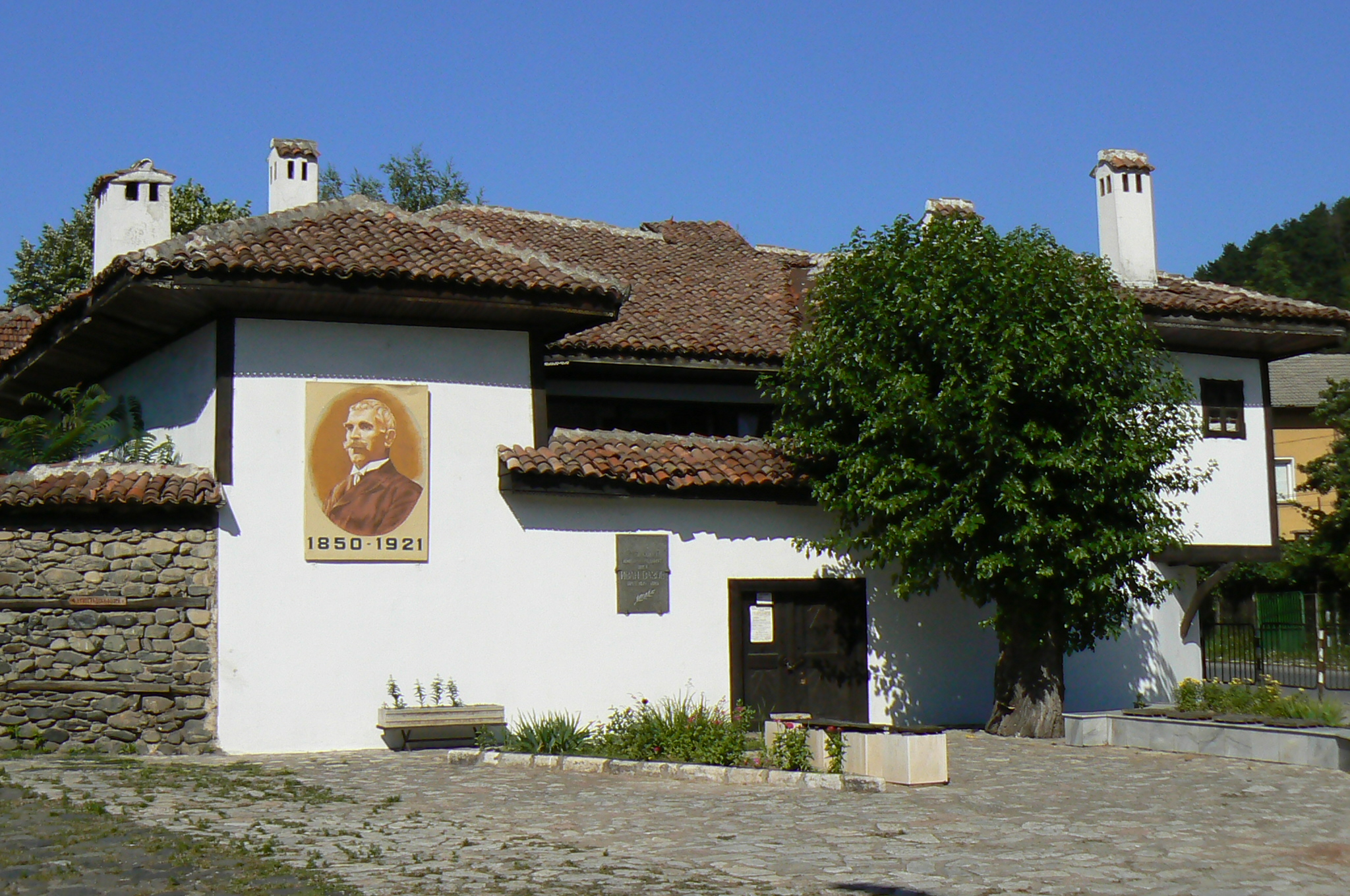
House-museum of Ivan Vazov

== Notable natives ==
- Timo Angelov, revolutionary, member of IMARO
