= Prokopios Lazaridis =

Greek Orthodox bishop

Saint Prokopios the new-hieromartyr of Iconium
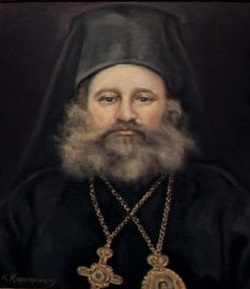
- Prokopios Lazaridis, Metropolitan of Iconium.
- Born: 1859; Tyana, in Konya Province, Ottoman Empire
- Died: 20 April 1923; Kayseri, Turkey
- Venerated in: Eastern Orthodox Church
- Canonized: 4 November 1992 by Church of Greece
- Feast: Sunday before the Exaltation of the Holy Cross (7-13 September)

Prokopios Lazaridis (Greek: Προκόπιος Λαζαρίδης, 1859–1923) was a Greek Orthodox metropolitan bishop, who served as a head in a number of bishoprics during the late Ottoman period. As a bishop of Iconium, modern Konya, in central Anatolia, he was involved with the issue of the creation of the Turkish Orthodox Church. He died in Turkish prison in 1923.

He is commemorated by the Greek Orthodox Church as Hieromartyr (Greek: ιερομάρτυρας) and his feast day is celebrated on the Sunday before the Exaltation of the Holy Cross each year (September 7–13).

== Life ==
Prokopios Lazaridis was born in Tyana, in Konya Province in 1859. He attended the Halki Seminary in Constantinople (Istanbul) at 1875. In 1899 he became Metropolitan of Dyrrachium (modern Durrës in central Albania), where he developed significant activity among the local Orthodox communities. In 1906 he was installed in the Anatolian city of Philadelphia (Alaşehir, Asia Minor), as the head of the local bishopric.

In 1911 he became metropolitan bishop of Iconium, in central Anatolia. During the Greco-Turkish War (1919-1922), the nationalist Turkish authorities in an attempt to Turkify and take the Orthodox church under their full control, founded the Turkish Orthodox Church in Kayseri and installed Papa Eftim as its head. Prokopios was against these developments and tried to reach a solution concerning the administration of the Orthodox Church in Anatolia.

In September 20, 1920, as a result of his intervention, Prokopios, as well as the local Armenian bishop of Konya, were imprisoned by the nationalist authorities of Mustafa Kemal. Prokopios then was transferred to the prison of Erzurum, and stayed there from October 1920 to May 1922. Soon after his release, he visited Ankara, where he met Mustafa Kemal in an attempt to ask him to abstain from the ecclesiastical dispute concerning the creation of the Turkish Orthodox Patriarchate, due to severe health problems he suffered. Nevertheless, his proposal was rejected.

Prokopios presided in the following ecclesiastical council at January 1923, where he was obliged to proclaim the Turkish Orthodox Church. However, Turkish interests subsided, due to the Greek defeat in Anatolia and the subsequent deportation of the Greek Orthodox communities from Anatolia. Prokopios was again imprisoned and died in detention in April 1923 in Kayseri prison.
