= Papa Eftim I =

Patriarch of the Turkish Orthodox Church

- Turkish Orthodox Patriarch and Archbishop of Istanbul
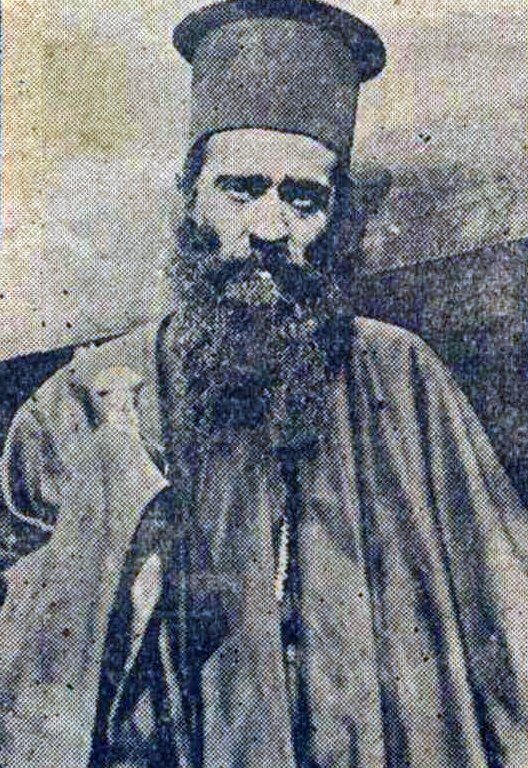
- Papa Eftim I in 1923
- Church: Turkish Orthodox Church
- See: Istanbul
- In office: 1926–1962
- Predecessor: Prokobiyos as deputy patriarch
- Successor: Papa Eftim II
- Previous post: Deputy Metropolitan of Keskin (1918-1919)

Orders
- Ordination: 1915
- Consecration: 1926

Personal details
- Born: Pavlos Karahisarithis (Zeki Erenerol); 1883 Akdağmadeni, Ottoman Empire
- Died: 14 March 1968 (aged 84–85) Istanbul, Turkey
- Denomination: Autocephalous Turkish Orthodox Patriarchate

Zeki Erenerol, born Pavlos Karahisaridis (Greek: Παύλος Καραχισαρίδης; 1883 – 14 March 1968), papal name Eftim I, was a Turkish Eastern Orthodox cleric of Pontic origin, who was the first Patriarch of the Autocephalous Turkish Orthodox Patriarchate that he founded. Eftim I was a Turkish nationalist and a friend of Mustafa Kemal Atatürk. He ruled as Patriarch from 1923 until 1962, when he resigned due to health problems. Keeping the title of honorary patriarch, he ordained his younger son as patriarch assuming the name Papa Eftim II.

== Earlier years ==
Karahisaridis was born in Maden kaza (today Akdağmadeni) of Bozok sanjak in 1883, in a Turkish-speaking Pontic family hailing from Şebinkarahisar (hence his birth surname). He worked in a factory. He was ordained as a deacon in 1912, and a priest in 1915 and was given the name Eftim (Greek: Ευθύμιος). In the house of his neighbor Çerkes Ethem, he met Mustafa Kemal and became a supporter of his ideas. He took part on 23 April 1920 in the opening of the Turkish Parliament as representative of the Turkish Orthodox Community of All Anatolia (Umum Anadolu Türk Ortodoksları Cemaatları). He later joined the Turkish troops and fought in the 1919-1922 Greco-Turkish war. Atatürk later stated that "Papa Eftim offered services to this country as much as a whole army".

In 1922 the Autocephalous Turkish Orthodox Patriarchate of Anatolia was founded in Kayseri by Father Pavlos Karahisarithis a supporter of the General Congregation of the Anatolian Turkish Orthodox, in opposition to Patriarch Meletius IV. During the meeting in a convent in Kayseri, the decision was made to establish a Turkish Christian church independent of the Ecumenical Patriarch of Constantinople.

Papa Eftim clarified his identity as: ''I am not Eftim the friend of Turks, I am Eftim the Turk who is the son of a Turk. I have always clarified my Turkish identity. Foreigners can be friends to Turks. However, a Turkish citizen like me being shown as a foreigner, questioning my people, hurts me deeply. I will never forgive people who do not call me a Turk, but rather a friend of Turks.''

Karahisaridis moved to Istanbul in 1923, and took the name Papa Eftim I. The same year, his supporters, with his tacit support assaulted Patriarch Meletius IV on 1 June 1923. On 2 October 1923 Papa Eftim besieged the Holy Synod and appointed his own Synod. When Eftim invaded the Greek Orthodox Patriarchate he proclaimed himself "the general representative of all the Orthodox communities" (Turkish: Bütün Ortodoks Cemaatleri Vekil Umumisi).

With a new Ecumenical Patriarch Gregory VII elected on 6 December 1923 after the abdication of Meletius IV, there was another occupation by Papa Eftim I and his followers, when he besieged the Patriarchate for the second time. This time around, they were evicted by the Turkish police.

== Establishment of the Turkish Orthodox Patriarchate ==
In 1924, Karahisarithis started to conduct the liturgy in Turkish, and quickly won support from the new Turkish Republic formed after the fall of the Ottoman Empire. He claimed that the Ecumenical Patriarchate of Constantinople was ethnically-centered and favored the Greek population. Being excommunicated for claiming to be a bishop while still having a wife (married bishops are generally not allowed in Orthodoxy) Karahisarithis, who later changed his name to Zeki Erenerol, called a Turkish ecclesial congress, which elected him Patriarch in 1924.

On 6 June 1924, in a conference in the Church of the Virgin Mary (Meryem Ana) in Galata, it was decided to transfer the headquarters of the Turkish Orthodox Patriarchate from Kayseri to Istanbul. In the same session it was also decided that the Church of Virgin Mary would become the Center of the new Patriarchate of the Turkish Orthodox Church.

Karahisarithis and his family members were exempted from the population exchange as per a decision of the Turkish government, although there was not the exemption for either Karahisaridis' followers or the wider Karamanlides communities of Turkish speaking Christian that was hoped for. Most of the Turkish speaking Orthodox population remained affiliated with the Greek Ecumenical Patriarchate of Constantinople.

The excommunication of Papa Eftim was revoked and he is consecrated as a bishop by metropolitan bishops Amorsios of Kayseri, Kirilios of Erdek and Agatangelos of Adalar on 18 March 1926.

In 1953 he organized a demonstration march against the Greek Orthodox Ecumenical Patriarch Athenagoras I and he continued to make statements against the Greek Patriarchate.

== Resignation and death ==
He resigned in 1962 due to ill health and his elder son Turgut Erenerol (formerly Giorgios Karahisaridis) became Papa Eftim II, and held this post until his death in 1991. The office was then passed to his younger son Selçuk Erenerol, who took the title Papa Eftim III until 2002. The current holder of the title is Paşa Ümit Erenerol, Papa Eftim I's grandson (son of Selçuk Erenerol, Papa Eftim III) who has held the title Papa Eftim IV since 2002.

He died on 14 March 1968 and was refused a burial in the Greek Orthodox cemetery of Şişli due to his excommunication, and the Turkish government had to intervene to secure his burial.

Preceded by Prokobiyos as deputy patriarch	Patriarch of the Turkish Orthodox Church; 1926–1962 (resigned)	Succeeded by Papa Eftim II
