= Yefimov =

Yefimov (Russian: Ефимов) or Yefimova (feminine; Ефимова) is a Russified surname of Greek origin with a Russian suffix ‘’’ov’’’. Alternate spellings include ‘’’Efimov and Efimoff’’’. And may refer to:

== Yefimov or Efimov ==
- Alexander Yefimov (1923–2012), a Soviet aircraft pilot and twice Hero of the Soviet Union
- Boris Efimov (1900–2008), a Soviet political cartoonist and propaganda artist
- Igor Yefimov (philosopher) (1937–2020), an American philosopher, writer, and publisher of Russian origin
- Mikhail Efimov (1881–1919), a Russian aviation pioneer
  2754 Efimov, an asteroid named after Mikhail Efimov
- Mikhail Yefimov (born 1978), Russian football player
- Nikolai Efimov (1910–1982), a Russian mathematician
- Sergei Yefimov (1922–1994), a Soviet army officer and Hero of the Soviet Union
- Sergei Efimov (born 1987), a Russian footballer
- Vitaly Efimov (born 1938), a Russian theoretical physicist
  The Efimov state is named after Vitaly Efimov.
- Vitaly Efimov (politician) (born 1940), Russian politician
- Vladimir Yefimov (1949–2012), a Russian type designer, typesetting font artist, theorist and teacher
- Vyacheslav Yefimov (1923–1943), a Soviet army officer and Hero of the Soviet Union

== Yefimova or Efimova ==
- Aleksandra Efimova, a Russian-American art entrepreneur
- Alisa Efimova (born 1999), a Finnish-Russian pair skater
- Alla Efimova, a Russian-American art historian
- Ekaterina Efimova (born 1993), a Russian volleyball player
- Emma Yefimova (1931 – 2004), a Soviet fencer
- Natalia Efimova (born 1983), a Russian orienteering competitor
- Nina Simonovich-Efimova (1877 – 1948), a Russian visual artist and puppeteer
- Olga Efimova (born 1990), another Russian volleyball player
- Yuliya Yefimova (born 1992), a Russian competitive swimmer
