= Timo Angelov =

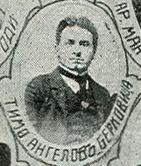
- Born: 1882; Berkovitsa, Bulgaria
- Died: 26 July 1903; Plovdiv, Bulgaria
- Organization: IMARO

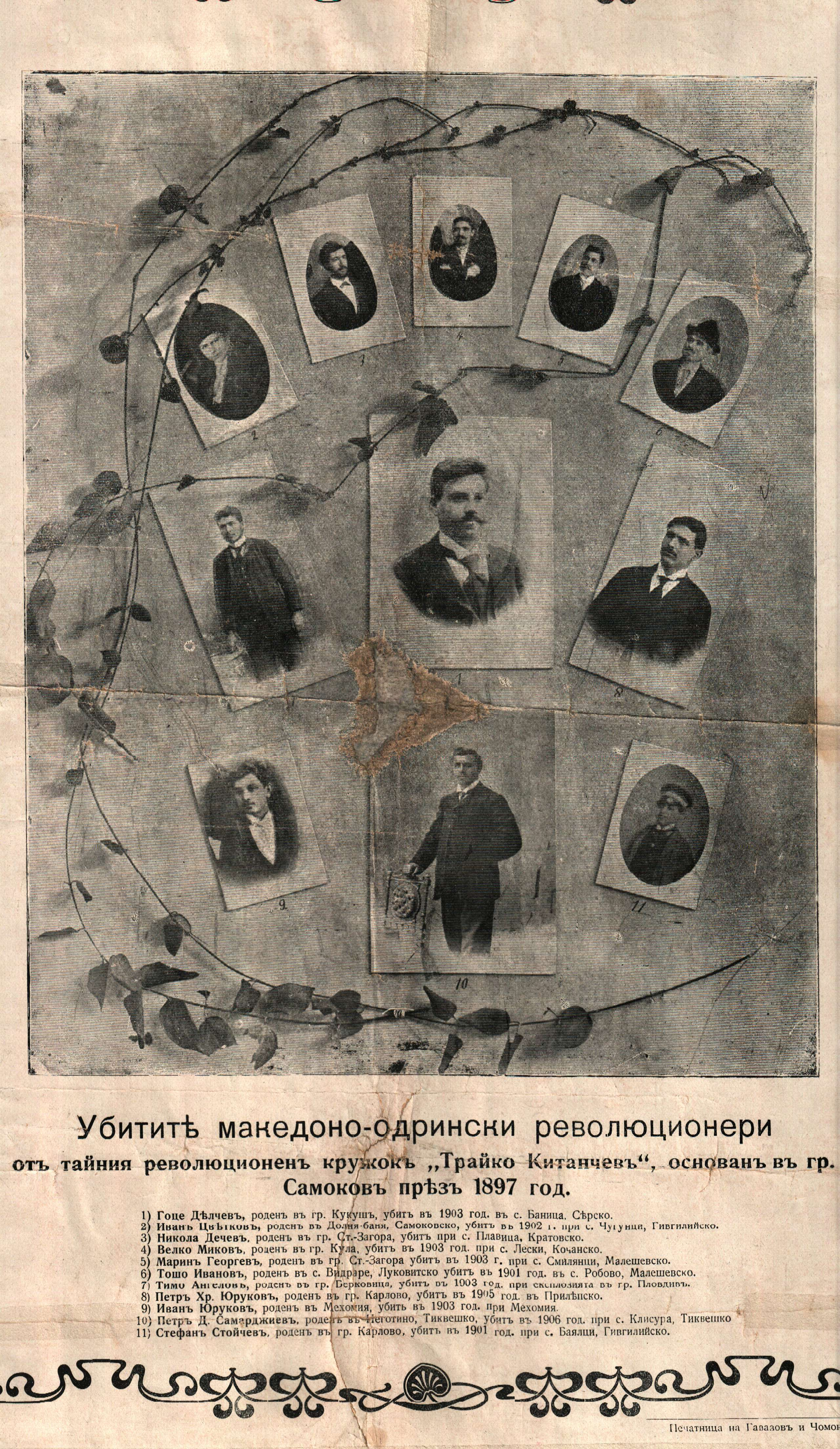
Memorial list with photos of the fallen members of the Trayko Kitanchev Revolutionary Circle with the portrait of Angelov

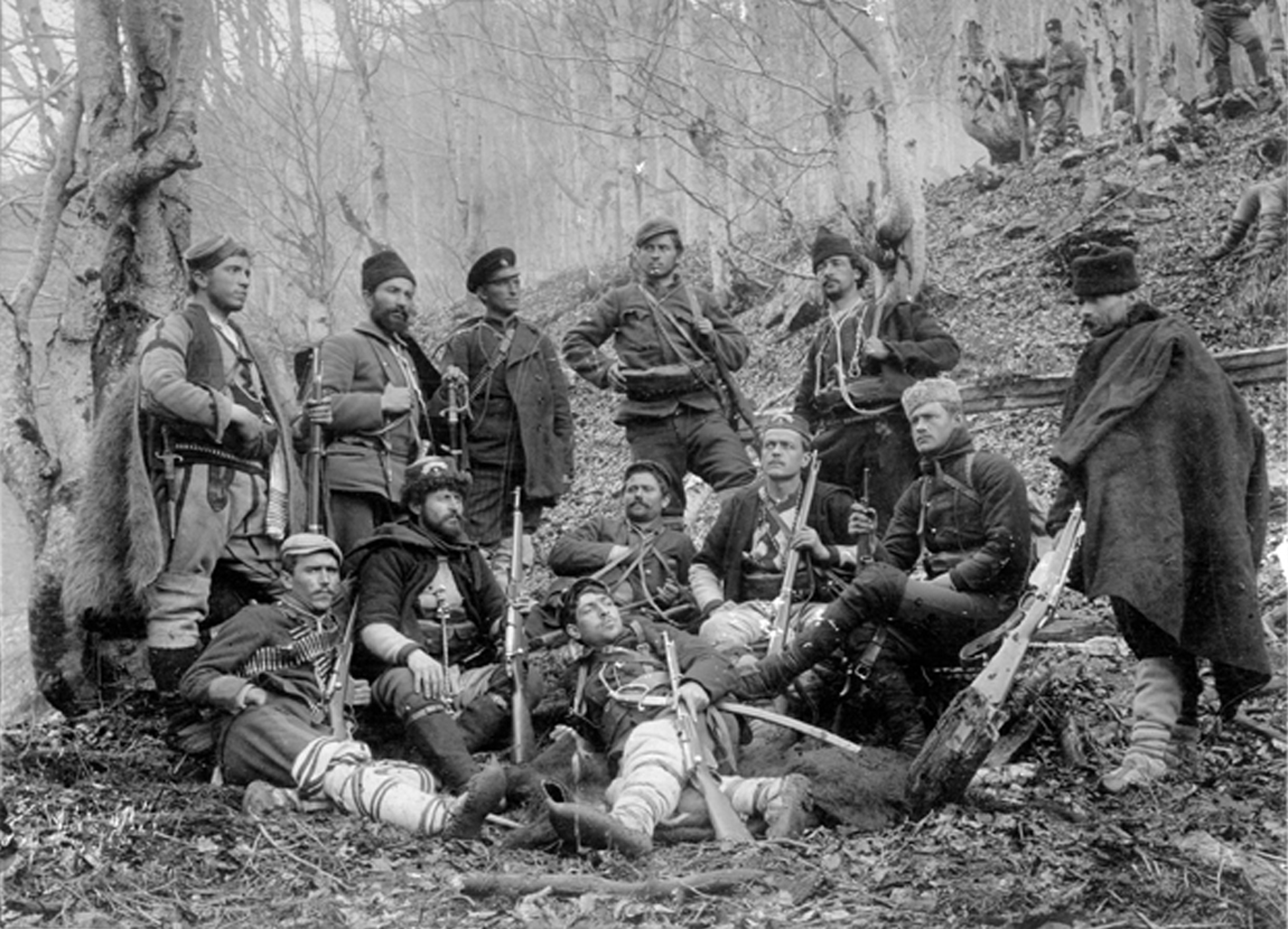
The band leaders on a meeting in the Osogovo mountain. Sitting from left to right: Panayot Baychev, Pitu Guli, Kosta Mazneykov, Hristo Chernopeev, Andrey Hristov, Todor Hristov. Standing from left to right: Nikola Zhezhov, Konstantin Kondov, Sotir Atanasov, Timo Angelov, Nikola Dechev and the courier Kolyo Sarafcheto.

Eftim Angelov (Bulgarian: Ефтим Ангелов), known as Timo Angelov (Bulgarian: Тимо Ангелов), was a Bulgarian revolutionary, a member of the Internal Macedonian-Adrianople Revolutionary Organization (IMARO).

Eftim Angelov was born in the town of Berkovitsa in 1882. He studied in the smithery school in Samokov, where he was nicknamed Timo Knyaza (the prince) and Eftim Tsarya (the tsar) by his friends. In Samokov he was member of the Trayko Kitanchev Revolutionary Circle which produced bombs for the needs of IMARO. In 1900 he went to the region of Mehomia as a freedom fighter and in 1903 he was appointed leader of the Tikvesh region. On 24 March 1903 the joint revolutionary bands of few leaders, among which were Hristo Chernopeev, Kosta Mazneykov (from the region of Radovish), Nikola Dechev (from the region of Veles) and Timo Angelov, went to Macedonia. There were 190 freedom fighters in the joint band. They were intercepted near the town of Kochani and this was the reason for their battles with the Turkish military that lasted for few days in the mountain Plachkovitsa. The revolutionary band led by Angelov was not able to reach this region and as a consequence it went back to Bulgaria.

After the unsuccessful attempt to enter Macedonia, Timo Angelov joined a group that was preparing bombs to blow up important military objects in Turkey during the Ilinden-Preobrazhenie Uprising. The workshop was located in Plovdiv, in the house of Mihail Gerdzhikov.

In 1903, while a bomb was prepared to blow the harbours of Istanbul, an explosion happened that killed Timo Angelov and two of his fellow freedom fighters.
