= General Congregation of the Anatolian Turkish Orthodox =

The General Congregation of the Anatolian Turkish Orthodox (Turkish: Umum Anadolu Türk Ortodoksları Cemaatleri) was a pro-Turkish nationalist group of Orthodox Christians set up in 1922 and mainly active in the Turkish-speaking, Eastern Orthodox Karamanlides population in central Anatolia. Unlike most Greek Orthodox Christians, they supported Kemal Atatürk. At the time, it had support from the Orthodox Bishop of Havza, as well as numerous other congregations.

== See also ==
- Christianity in Turkey
