= Gregory VII of Constantinople =

Encumenical Patriarch of Constantinople from 1923 to 1924

Gregory VII
- 262nd Archbishop of Constantinople, New Rome and Ecumenical Patriarch
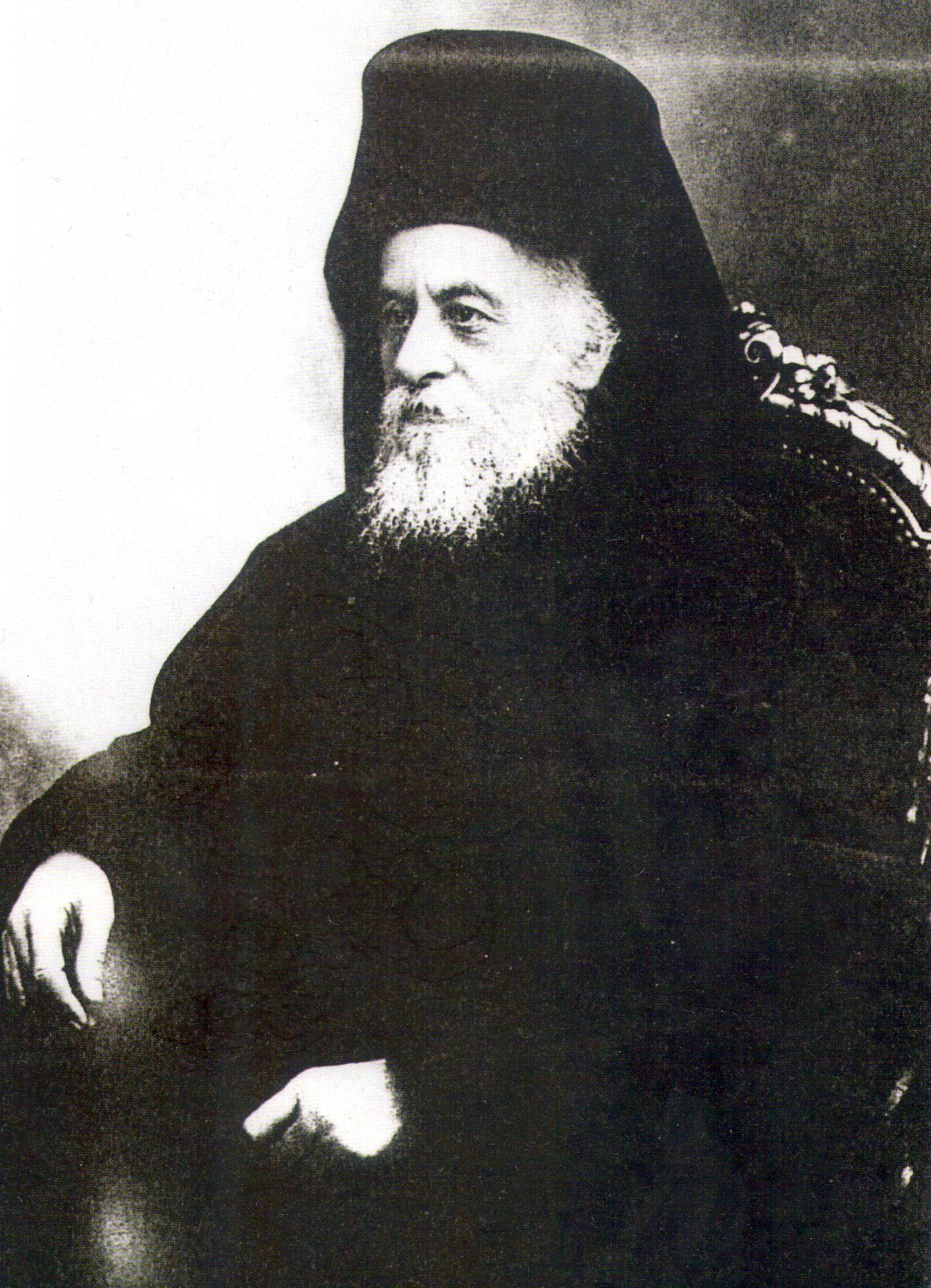
- Church: Ecumenical Patriarchate of Constantinople
- See: Constantinople
- In office: 6 December 1923 – 17 November 1924
- Predecessor: Meletius IV
- Successor: Constantine VI

Personal details
- Born: Gregorios Zervoudakis; 21 September 1850 Stavri (Apollonia) of Sifnos, Greece
- Died: 17 November 1924 (aged 74) Constantinople, Turkey
- Denomination: Eastern Orthodoxy

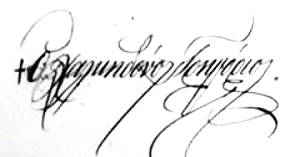
Signature

Ecumenical Patriarch Gregory VII (Greek: Γρηγόριος Ζʹ; secular name Gregorios Zervoudakis (Ζερβουδάκης); 21 September 1850 – 17 November 1924) was Ecumenical Patriarch of Constantinople from December 1923 until his death in November 1924, serving as the primus inter pares (first among equals) and spiritual leader of Easter Orthodox Christianity worldwide.

He was the Metropolis of Chalcedon before being elevated to the patriarchal throne. He imported the New Style Calendar to the Church of Constantinople. He died suddenly of a massive heart attack in 1924.

== Biography ==
He was born in Stavri (Apollonia) of Sifnos. He studied at the Theological School of Halki, from which he graduated in 1882, after submitting a thesis entitled "On the Authenticity of the Four Gospels". He served in the Diocese of Rhodes as deacon and as chancellor (protosygelos).

In 1887 he was elected bishop of Myreo; in 1892 metropolitan of Serres; in 1909 metropolitan of Kyzikos; and in 1913 metropolitan of Chalcedon. During the Asia Minor campaign, when the Ecumenical Patriarchate of Constantinople decided to sever relations with the government of the Ottoman Empire, Gregory VII, disagreeing with this decision, resigned as president of the National Joint Council and from the Holy Synod and retired to his Metropolis.

After the resignation of Patriarch Meletius IV of Constantinople on 20 September 1923, the Synod of the Patriarchate was convened for the first election of a Patriarch after the signing of the Treaty of Lausanne. The Government of Turkey set the inviolable condition that the person elected must have Turkish citizenship. On 6 December 1923, only those bishops residing in Constantinople gathered for the election of a new Patriarch. The bishops selected Gregory VII, who had not been involved in secular political issues and had even maintained good relations with the Turkish authorities. After his election, Gregory VII sent a letter of recognition to the Turkish Government in Ankara. Papa Eftim I, the head of the Turkish Orthodox Church, and his followers opposed the election.

Gregory VII was enthroned on 6 December 1923. On 19 February 1924, the Synodal Court deposed Papa Eftim I for "faction and attitude". On 10 May 1924, Metropolitan Vasilios (Komvopoulos) of Chaldea, who had organized churches in America without the permission of the Ecumenical Patriarchate, was also deposed. With his actions towards the Greek Government, Gregory VII tried to avoid the expulsion of clergy based on the agreed exchange of populations. In 1924 he recognized the autocephaly of the Polish Orthodox Church. He established the Metropolises of the Princes' Islands, of Central Europe, and of Australia.

In September 1924, Gregory VII developed gallstones that developed into obstructive jaundice that could not be treated. He died on 17 November of the same year.

== Notes and references ==
Eastern Orthodox Church titles
Preceded by Meletius IV	Ecumenical Patriarch of Constantinople; 1923 – 1924	Succeeded by Constantine VI
