= Karamanlides =

Greek Orthodox Turkish-speaking ethnic group

Καραμανλήδες Karamanlılar
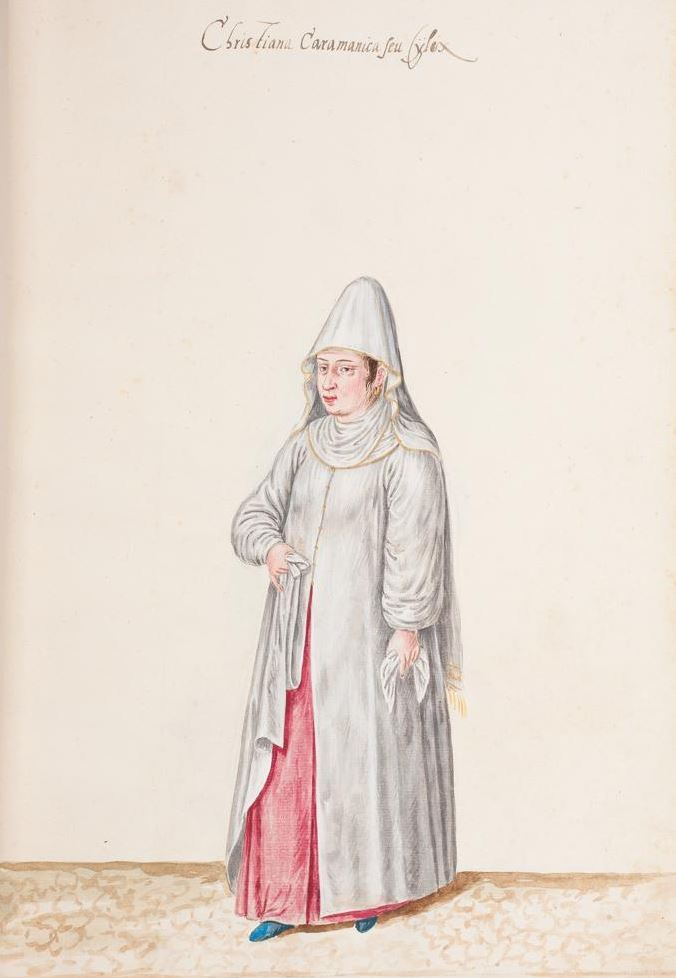
- Christian lady from Karaman (Christiana Caramanica), depicted by Lambert de Vos in 1574

Regions with significant populations
- Greece

Languages
- Traditionally Karamanli Turkish, now predominantly Modern Greek

Religion
- Greek Orthodox

Related ethnic groups
- Cappadocian Greeks, Pontic Greeks, other Asia Minor Greeks, Urums, Christian Turks

The Karamanlides (Greek: Καραμανλήδες, romanized: Karamanlídes; Turkish: Karamanlılar), also known as Karamanli Greeks or simply Karamanlis, are a traditionally Turkish-speaking Greek Orthodox people native to the region of Karaman in Central Anatolia, and in the Karaman Eyalet by extension.

Several scholars regard Karamanlides as the Turkish-speaking Greeks from Karaman, though their exact ethnic origin is disputed: they could either be descendants of Byzantine Greeks who were linguistically Turkified; or of Christian Turkic soldiers who settled in the region after the Turkic conquests; or even both. The Karamanlides were forced to leave Anatolia during the 1923 population exchange between Greece and Turkey. Today, a majority of the population live in Greece and have fully integrated into Greek society.

== Language ==
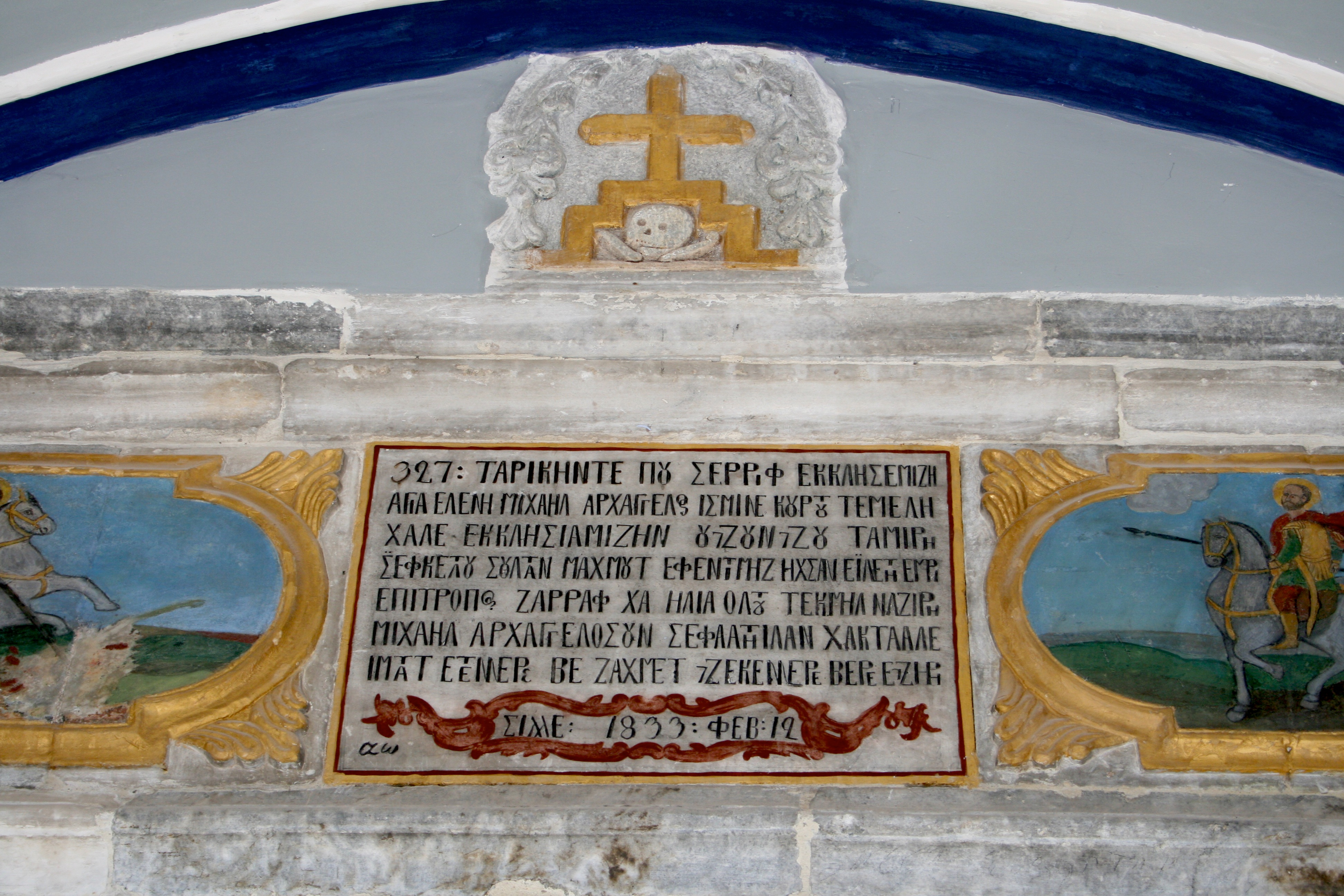
An inscription in Karamanli Turkish on the entrance of the former Greek Orthodox church of Agia Eleni in Sille, near Konya

The language used by the Karamanlides was called Karamanli Turkish, sometimes referred to as Karamanlídika or Karamanlı Türkçesi, and is an endangered language, as there are very few speakers left in Greece today. It originally belonged to the family of Anatolian Turkish dialects. As for structure and vocabulary, the language followed the basic features of Turkish in Anatolia in grammar, lexicon, and phonetics; nevertheless, it sometimes incorporated regional influences. Its uniqueness, however, was due to the way it was written since, unlike the official Ottoman Turkish, which was based on Arabic script, the Karamanlides employed the Greek alphabet supplemented with some Turkish phonetic symbols, giving rise to an abundant literary corpus of books, religious literature, and publications dating back to the 18th and 19th centuries.

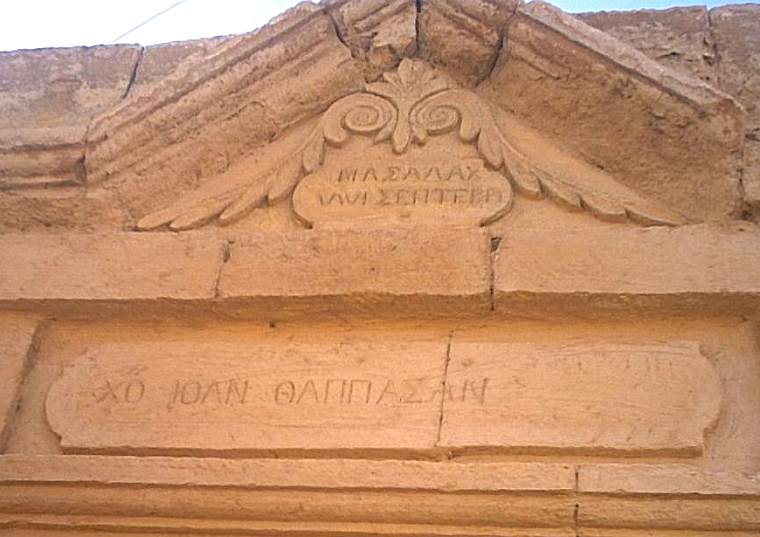
Karamanli Turkish inscription found on the door of a house in İncesu, Kayseri, Turkey

A fragment of a manuscript written in Karamanli was also found in the Cairo Geniza.

== Origins and history ==
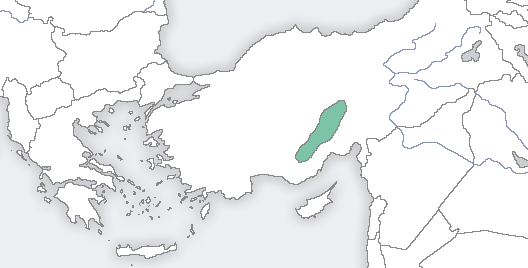
The region where Karamanlides were concentrated in the past

The origin of the Karamanlides is disputed; they are either descendants of Byzantine Greeks who were linguistically Turkified through a gradual process of assimilation by the Ottomans, or of Turkic soldiers who settled in the region after the Turkic conquests and converted to Christianity. Greek scholars incline to the view that the Karamanlides were of Greek descent and adopted Turkish as their vernacular, either by force or as a result of their isolation from the Greek-speaking Orthodox Christians of the coastal regions. Turkish scholars regard them as the descendants of Turks who had migrated to Byzantine territories before the conquest or had served as mercenaries in the Byzantine armies and who had adopted the religion but not the language of their new rulers. Several foreign scholars consider them to be ethnically Greek. Another theory supports that the Karamanlides may have been a mixture of Anatolian Greeks and Christian Turks. There is not enough evidence to prove how the early Karamanlides identified themselves.

Partial or full Turkification of Anatolian Greeks dates back to the early 1100s, as a result of living together with neighboring Turks. Oriental and Latin sources indicate that Greek-Turkish bilingualism was common in Anatolia in the 13th and 14th centuries, and by the early 15th century it was very widespread. Furthermore, an anonymous Latin account from 1437 states that Greek bishops and metropolitans in Anatolia, were "dressed in the Muslim style and spoke Turkic"; "although the liturgy was still read in Greek the sermons were pronounced in Turkic." Daniel Panzac elaborates that the Greeks of Karaman were fully Turkified during the reign of Murad III (r. 1574–1595), and some of them had also converted to Islam. Karamanlides could be descendants of those Turkified Greeks.

The Ottoman explorer Evliya Çelebi, who visited the Karamanlides and experienced their lifestyle, wrote that they spoke with an authentic Turkish accent but used Greek and Latin words as well. They printed books, particularly the bible, in Turkish language and chanted hymns in Karamanlidika, despite their neighborhoods also having Greek-speaking communities. The British historian Arnold J. Toynbee (1889–1975) emphasized that there was no definite answer to the question of their origins.

The German traveler Hans Dernschwam (1494–1568/69) encountered the Karamanlides living in Istanbul during his travel throughout Anatolia in 1553–1555; he described them as "a Christian folk of the Greek faith whom Selim I had transplanted from the emirate of Karamania." The Armenian historian Eremia Chelebi (1637–1695), also stated that Karamanlides lived around and within the city walls of Istanbul, and despite being Greek, they did not know Greek and spoke only Turkish. A Karamanlis author named Mauromates (1656–1740) wrote that the Greek language was replaced by Turkish in Anatolia, and were thus unable to read the "masterpieces of Greek literature." Another Karamanlis author named Iosepos Moesiodax, wrote in his Paedagogy (1779) that "the need of our public demands good Turkish, because it is the dialect of our Rulers." The English writer William Martin Leake (1777–1860), who travelled in Konya in 1800, wrote:

[...] the generality of the Cappadocian Greeks is ignorant of their own language and use the Turkish in the church service [...] at Konia we are comfortably accommodated in the house of a Christian belonging to the Greek church, but who is ignorant of the language, which is not even used in the church service: they have the four Gospels and the Prayers printed in Turkish. [...] it is an indisputable fact [...] that in a great part of Anatolia even the public worship of the Greeks is now performed in the Turkish tongue.

The German orientalist Franz Taeschner (1888–1967) observed that the Karamanlides were completely Turkified, with the exception of their religion. The British historian Edwin Pears (1835–1919), who lived in Turkey for approximately 40 years, wrote that the Karamanlides were originally Greeks, who had lost their native language and spoke Turkish. Robert Pinkerton (1780–1859) stated that the Turkish oppression had made them adopt the Turkish language:

[…] The result of my inquiry shows that there still remains much to be done by Bible Societies for the poor, ignorant, and oppressed Christians of Lesser Asia, the majority of whom, in the language in the present day, have almost entirely lost the knowledge of their native language, and speak and understand nothing but Turkish. The two Christian nations which I have particularly in view are the Greek and Armenian. The cruel persecution of their Mahomedan masters have been the cause of their present degraded state of ignorance, even in regard to their native tongue. For that there was a time when their Turkish masters strictly prohibited the Greeks in Asia Minor even from speaking the Greek language among themselves, and that they cut out the tongues of some, and punished others with death, who dared to disobey this their barbarous command. It is an indisputable fact, that the language of their oppressors has long since almost universally prevailed, and that in a great part of Anatolia even the public worship of the Greeks is now performed in the Turkish tongue.

Similarly, the British scholar David George Hogarth (1862–1927) attributed the Turkification of the Karamanlides to oppression; in 1890 while visiting Lake Eğirdir, he wrote that "the Moslems were eating them up."

British Archaeologist Richard MacGillivray Dawkins traveled between the Karamanlides and Bithynia between 1909 and 1911. Dawkins came to İzmit and Bursa regions after this trip and stated that there are Turkish-speaking Greek villages here. According to him, the Greek spoken here was very close to the language spoken by the Karamanlides. Even Dawkins stated that their language was Asiatic and showed different features from Greek. It is known that some Karamanlides lived in İznik as well as Bursa, İzmit and Yalova, and they left Turkish inscriptions written in Greek letters.

== Population exchange between Greece and Turkey ==
The Turkish government considered cutting a deal for Turkish-speaking Christians to be exempt from the population exchange. At the end however, it was decided that religion would be the only criterion of the exchange. Greek political elites saw no harm in taking in more Greek Orthodox Christians, but Turkish political elites remained fearful that the Karamanlides' loyalty to the Ecumenical Patriarchate of Constantinople would eventually undercut efforts to consolidate state control in the poor and underdeveloped region of Karaman. Only Papa Eftim I (born Pávlos Karahisarídis), an ardent Turkish nationalist and the creator of the Autocephalous Turkish Orthodox Patriarchate, was allowed to remain in Anatolia. Upon their arrival in Greece, Karamanlides faced many instances of discrimination by the local Greek population "because they spoke the language of the age-old enemy of Hellenism"; sometimes even taunted with the allegation that they were of Turkish background. By the 1980s, they were well integrated into Greek society.

== Culture ==
The distinct culture that developed among the Karamanlides blended elements of Orthodox Christianity with a Turkish-Anatolian culture that characterized their willingness to accept and immerse themselves in foreign customs. From the 14th to the 19th centuries, they enjoyed an explosion in literary refinement. Karamanlides authors were especially productive in philosophy, religious writings, novels, and historical texts. Their lyrical poetry in the late 19th century describes their indifference to both Greek and Turkish governments, and the confusion which they felt as a Turkish-speaking people with a Greek Orthodox religion.

== See also ==
- Urums
