= Papa Eftim IV =

Patriarch of the Turkish Orthodox Church

- Turkish Orthodox Patriarch and Archbishop of Istanbul
- Church: Turkish Orthodox Church
- See: Istanbul
- Installed: 22 December 2002
- Predecessor: Papa Eftim III

Orders
- Consecration: 2000 by Papa Eftim III

Personal details
- Born: Paşa Ümit Erenerol; 1960 (age 65–66) Istanbul, Turkey
- Denomination: Autocephalous Turkish Orthodox Patriarchate

Papa Eftim IV (born Paşa Ümit Erenerol) is the fourth and incumbent patriarch of the Autocephalous Turkish Orthodox Patriarchate. He was given the title of Turkish Orthodox Patriarch of the Autocephalous Turkish Orthodox Patriarchate, an unrecognised Orthodox Christian denomination, with strong influences from Turkish nationalist ideology.

Papa Eftim IV was born as Paşa Ümit Erenerol. He is the grandson of Papa Eftim I and the son of Papa Eftim III. He became patriarch after Papa Eftim III resigned his position after political disagreements with the Turkish government over growing links between the Turkish state and the Greek Ecumenical Patriarch, and Turkish attempts to join the European Union; Papa Eftim III died a few weeks later.

Eftim IV took over office in 2002.

Preceded by Papa Eftim III	Patriarch of the Turkish Orthodox Church; 2002–	Succeeded by Incumbent
