= Patriarch Nicholas V of Alexandria =

Greek Patriarch of Alexandria from 1936 to 1939

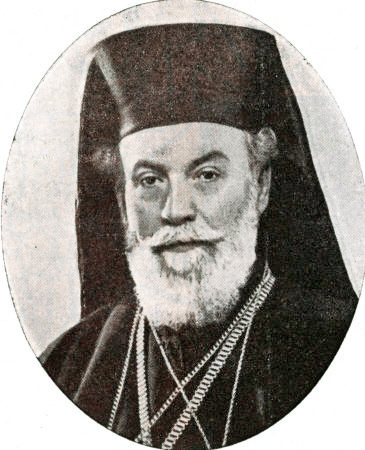
Patriarch Nicholas V of Alexandria

Nicholas V (1876– 3 March 1939) served as Greek Patriarch of Alexandria from 1936 to his death in 1939.

He worked very hard on the internal reorganization of the philanthropic institutions of the Church and the harmonious operation of the educational institutes.

Preceded by Meletius II	Greek Patriarch of Alexandria; 1936–1939	Succeeded by Christopher II
