= Patriarch Photius of Alexandria =

Greek Patriarch of Alexandria from 1900 to 1925

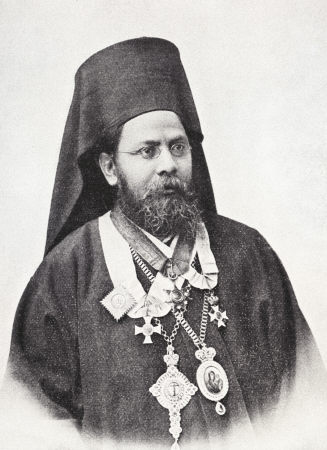
Patriarch Photius of Alexandria.

Photius (1853 – 4 September 1925) was the Greek Patriarch of Alexandria from 1900 to his death in 1925. He opposed reform to change from the Julian calendar to the Gregorian calendar. He died in Zürich.

Eastern Orthodox Church titles
Preceded by Sophronius IV	Greek Patriarch of Alexandria; 1900–1925	Succeeded by Meletius II
