= Patriarch Christopher II of Alexandria =

Greek Patriarch of Alexandria from 1939 to 1966

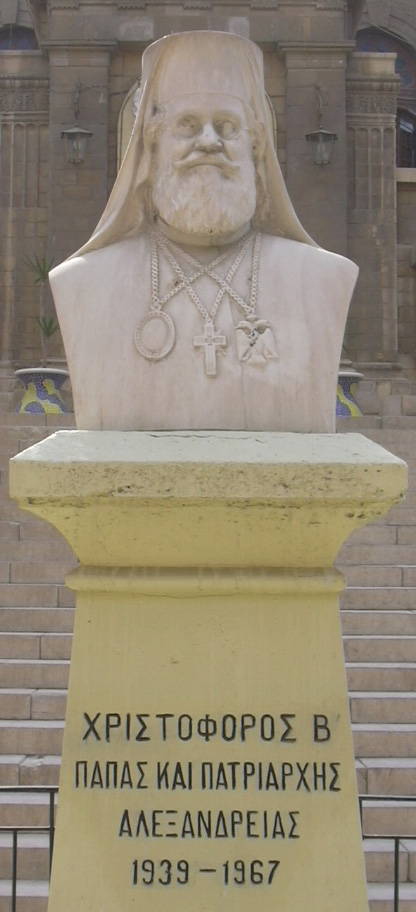
Bust of Christopher II located between St. George's Convent and St. George's Church in Cairo.

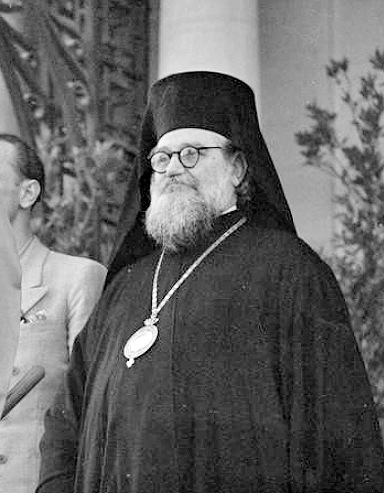

Christopher II (Kharalambos Danielidis, modern Greek: Χαράλαμπος Δανιηλίδης; 17 January 1876, Madytos - 23 June 1967) served as the Greek Orthodox Patriarch of Alexandria between 1939 and 1966.

Preceded by Nicholas V	Greek Orthodox Patriarch of Alexandria; 1939–1966	Succeeded by Nicholas VI
