= Nikola Dechev =

Bulgarian revolutionary (1880–1903)

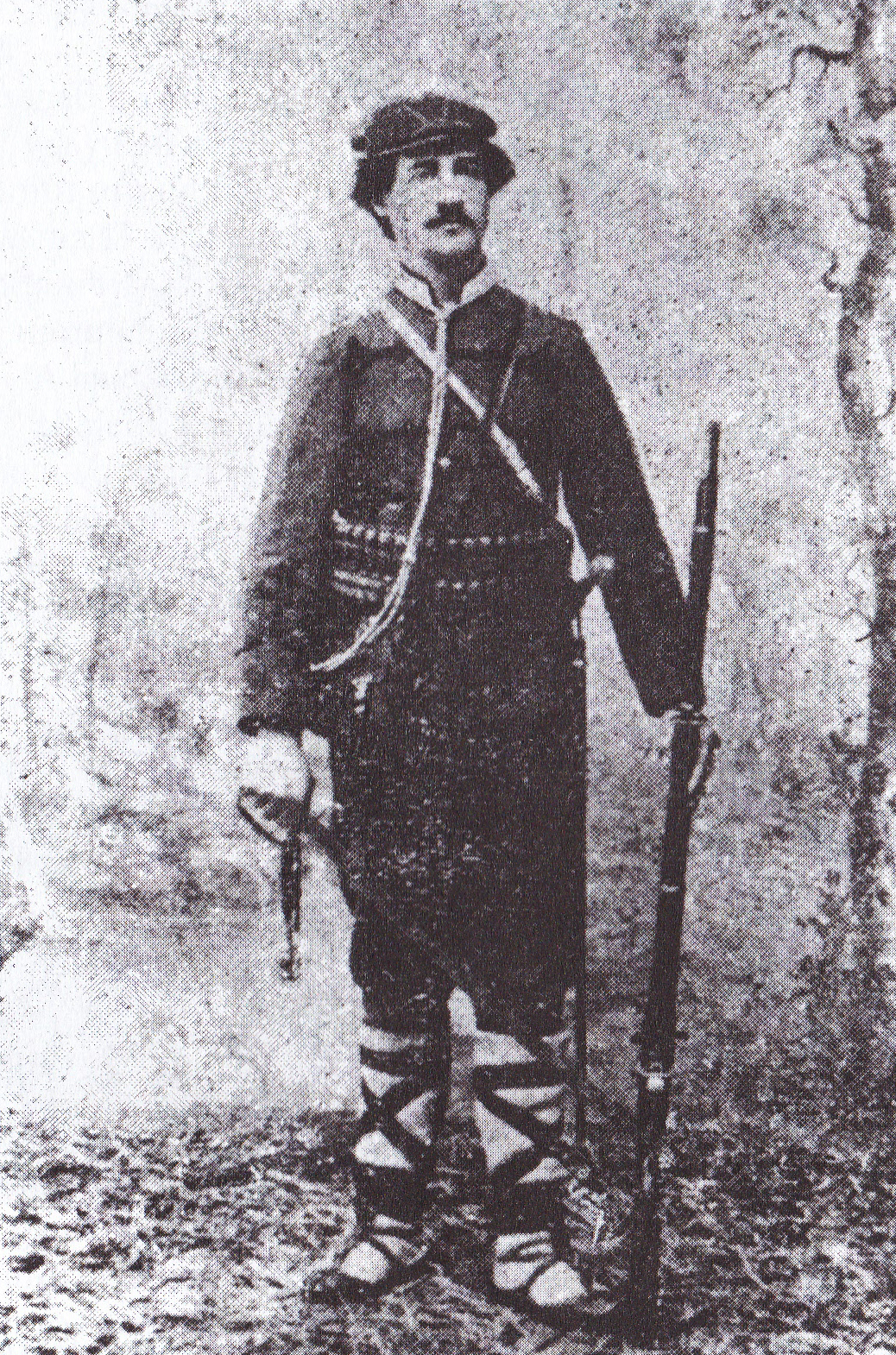
Dechev, c. 1900

Nikola Dechev (1880 – September 25, 1903) was a Bulgarian revolutionary, a member of the Internal Macedonian Revolutionary Organization, leader of several detachments active in the region of the town of Veles, Macedonia.

== Biography ==
Nikola Dechev was born in 1880, in Stara Zagora, then part of Eastern Rumelia. From 1895 to 1898, Dechev studied in the town of Samokov, where under the influence of Gotse Delchev he became a member of the IMRO. In 1900, he became a secretary in the detachment of Andon Kyoseto, and in 1901 Dechev was assistant voivode (military leader) of Hristo Chernopeev in the Gorna Dzhumaya region. In 1901, together with Hristo Chernopeev and Yane Sandanski, he took part in the abduction of Ellen Maria Stone. In 1902, Dechev was appointed voivode of Veles, where his detachment entered in April and set up committee networks. He opposed the actions of the local pro-Serbian guerrillas in the region and took part in battles with them. After the decision to raise the Ilinden Uprising in January 1903, Nikola Dechev arrived in Bulgaria. In Sofia he met with Hristo Tatarchev and Hristo Matov, then foreign representatives of the IMRO. He also returned to Stara Zagora, where he met the leader of the IMRO Ivan Garvanov. In March 1903, he went to Kyustendil, where a second Veles detachment was formed under his command. He entered Macedonia, where in April there was a major battle with a regular Turkish army. After the heavy losses suffered by Nikola Dechev's detachment, he withdrew back to Bulgaria. In the summer of the same year, he took part in the Ilinden-Preobrazhenie Uprising, trying to enter the interior of Macedonia with a new detachment in September. On September 25, they were surrounded and fought a heavy battle against several thousand Turkish troops near the village of Lukovo. More than 30 partisans were killed, including Dechev, and the rest withdrew at night to the border of the Principality of Bulgaria.
