= Aleksandra Efimova =

Aleksandra Efimova is founder of Aleksandra Enterprises, the parent company of arts-oriented brands Russian Pointe and Growing Through Arts, both based in Chicago. Efimova grew up in St. Petersburg, Russia and attended art school at The State Hermitage Museum. She moved to the United States in 1993 as a young adult, founded her first company while still in college (Eastern Michigan University where she received a bachelor's degree in international business and marketing), and is an alumna of Harvard Business School (OPM program). Alongside her entrepreneurship and company leadership, Efimova is also active in supporting the artistic and Russian-American communities. She co-chairs the Moscow Committee of Chicago Sister Cities International, serves on other boards and committees, and organizes events regarding the arts, business development and international relations.
