= Papa Eftim II =

Patriarch of the Turkish Orthodox Church

- Turkish Orthodox Patriarch and Archbishop of Istanbul
- Church: Turkish Orthodox Church
- See: Istanbul
- In office: 1962 – 1991
- Predecessor: Papa Eftim I
- Successor: Papa Eftim III

Orders
- Ordination: 1937
- Consecration: 1961 by Papa Eftim I

Personal details
- Born: Turgut Erenerol; 1920 Ankara, Ottoman Empire
- Died: 9 May 1991 (aged 70–71) Istanbul, Turkey
- Denomination: Autocephalous Turkish Orthodox Patriarchate
- Profession: Theologian, Physician
- Education: Istanbul University

Papa Eftim II (born Yiorghos Karahisarithis; Greek: Γιώργος Καραχισαρίδης, later changed to Turgut Erenerol; 1920, Ankara – 9 May 1991, Istanbul) was the elder son of Papa Eftim I, the founder of the Autocephalous Turkish Orthodox Patriarchate, an unrecognised Orthodox Christian denomination, with strong influences from Turkish nationalist ideology.

Karahisarithis was a doctor of medicine by profession. He became patriarch after Papa Eftim I resigned in 1962 due to ill health. While his father survived until 14 March 1968, Eftim II took over office ruling from 1962 until his death on 9 May 1991. He was succeeded by his younger brother Papa Eftim III.

Preceded by Papa Eftim I	Patriarch of the Turkish Orthodox Church; 1962–1991	Succeeded by Papa Eftim III
