= Papa Eftim III =

Patriarch of the Turkish Orthodox Church

- Turkish Orthodox Patriarch and Archbishop of Istanbul
- Papa Eftim III in 1934 with his father Papa Eftim I
- Church: Turkish Orthodox Church
- See: Istanbul
- In office: 1991 – 2002
- Predecessor: Papa Eftim II
- Successor: Papa Eftim IV

Orders
- Ordination: 1956
- Consecration: 1961 by Papa Eftim I

Personal details
- Born: Selçuk Erenerol; 1926 Istanbul, Turkey
- Died: 20 December 2002 (aged 75–76) Istanbul, Turkey
- Denomination: Autocephalous Turkish Orthodox Patriarchate

Papa Eftim III, secular name Selçuk Erenerol (1926 – 20 December 2002), was the third patriarch of the Autocephalous Turkish Orthodox Patriarchate. He was given the title of Turkish Orthodox Patriarch of the Autocephalous Turkish Orthodox Patriarchate, an unrecognised Orthodox Christian denomination, with strong influences from Turkish nationalist ideology.

Papa Eftim III was known as Selçuk Erenerol. He was the younger son of Papa Eftim I and younger brother of Papa Eftim II. He was a businessman by profession. He became patriarch after Papa Eftim II died in May 1991. Eftim III took over office ruling from 1991 until his resignation in 2002, after political disagreements with the Turkish government over growing links between the Turkish state and the Greek Ecumenical Patriarch and Turkish attempts to join the European Union. He was succeeded by his son Paşa Ümit Erenerol named as Papa Eftim IV.

Papa Eftim III died on 20 December 2002 just weeks after his resignation from his position.

Preceded by Papa Eftim II	Patriarch of the Turkish Orthodox Church; 1991–2002 (resigned)	Succeeded by Papa Eftim IV
