= Meletius Metaxakis =

Ecumenical Patriarch of Constantinople from 1921 to 1923

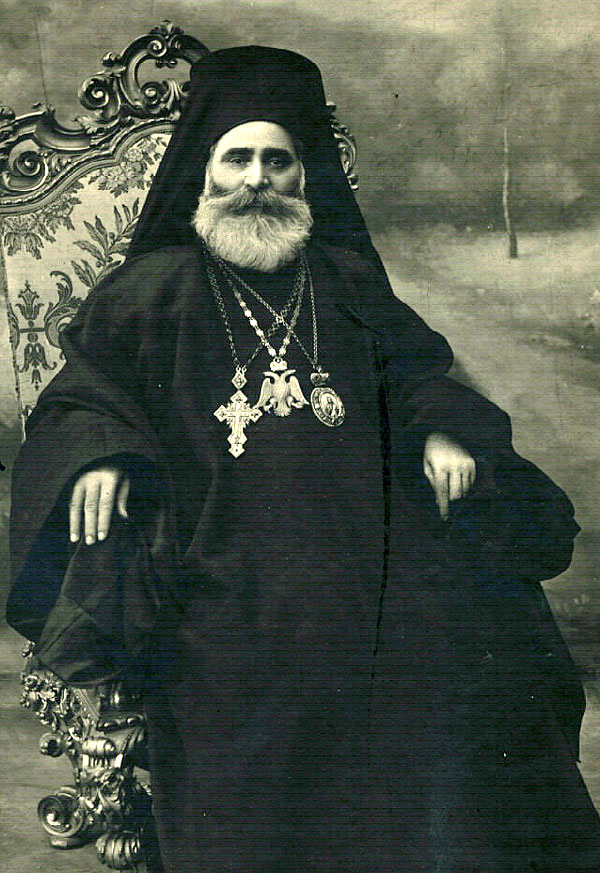
Meletius IV as Ecumenical Patriarch of Constantinople, 1923
Greek Orthodox Patriarch of Alexandria
- In office: 1926–1935
- Predecessor: Photius of Alexandria
- Successor: Nicholas V of Alexandria
Ecumenical Patriarch of Constantinople
- In office: 8 December 1921 – 20 September 1923
- Predecessor: Germanus V of Constantinople
- Successor: Gregory VII of Constantinople
Archbishop of Athens and All Greece
- In office: 1918–1920
- Predecessor: Theocletus I
- Successor: Theocletus I

Orders
- Consecration: 4 April 1910 by Kyrillos II of Cyprus

Personal details
- Born: Emmanuel Metaxakis; 21 September 1871 Christos, Ierapetra, Ottoman Crete
- Died: 28 July 1935 (aged 63) Alexandria, Kingdom of Egypt
- Denomination: Eastern Orthodoxy

Meletius Metaxakis (Greek: Μελέτιος; secular name Emmanuel Metaxakis, Ἐμμανουήλ Μεταξάκης; 21 September 1871 – 28 July 1935) was primate of the Church of Greece from 1918 to 1920 as Meletius III, after which he was Ecumenical Patriarch of Constantinople as Meletius IV from 1921 to 1923 and Greek Patriarch of Alexandria as Meletius II from 1926 to 1935. He is the only man in the history of the Eastern Orthodox Church to serve successively as the senior bishop of three autocephalous churches.

== Life ==
=== Early life ===
Emmanuel Metaxakis was born in Crete in the commune of Christos, now part of the Ierapetra municipality. His father was a livestock breeder and his maternal uncle was the village priest. (Note: Η παιδική ηλικία του Πατριάρχη Μελετίου. Με το κοσμικό όνομα Εμμανουήλ ο Μελέτιος ήταν πρωτότοκος γιος του Νικολάου Μεταξάκη και της Μαρίας το γένος Αντωνίου Προβατάκη και γεννήθηκε στο χωριό Παρσάς της Κοινότητας Χριστού της επαρχίας "Ιεραπέτρας του νομού Λασιθίου Κρήτης, στις 21 Σεπτεμβρίου του έτους 1871. Η μητέρα του Μαρία Προβατάκη, αδελφή του παπά Στεφάνου, γεννήθηκε στο χωριό Χριστός. Ο πατέρας του Νικόλαος Μεταξάκης μετερχόμενος το επάγγελμα του γεωργού και του κτηνοτρόφου ήταν εριστικός και φιλόδικος όπως φανερώνεται από επιστολές και του ίδιου του Μελετίου που θα παρουσιάσουμε παρακάτω. Ο παππούς του Μελετίου ονομαζόταν Γεώργιος Δαγαλάκης και επειδή ασχολούνταν με την μεταξουργία επονομά Κρήτης. Αποκτά 11 παιδιά - 3 στον Παρσά και 8 στις. [Regarding the childhood of Meletios: "With the secular name of Emmanuel, Meletius was the first son of Nicholas Metaxakis, and Maria, a descendant of Antonios Provatakis, and was born in the village of Parsas, in the commune of Christos, in the province of Ierapetra, in the prefecture of Lasithi, Crete, on 21 September 1871. His mother, Mary Provatakis, the sister of the priest Stephen, was born in the village of Christos. His father, Nicholas Metaxakis, a farmer and stock breeder by profession, had moved there and was bad-tempered and quarrelsome, as depicted in the letters of Meletius himself which we will submit further down. Meletius's grandfather was named George Dagalakis because he was engaged in the eponymous silk industry of Crete; he had eleven children, three in Parsas, and eight elsewhere"].) From 1889 to 1891, Emmanuel studied at the Patriarchal School of the Brotherhood of the Holy Sepulchre. In 1891, he became the hegumen of the Monastery of Bethlehem, and the Archbishop of Mount Tabor, Spyridon, ordained him a deacon with the name of Meletius. He resumed his studies at the Theological School of the Exaltation of the Precious Cross at Jerusalem, when the school opened in 1893. He graduated in 1893 primi ordinis.

In 1903, he was appointed chancellor of the Patriarchate of Jerusalem and administered the reorganisation of the patriarchal printing office and the editing of the periodical New Zion in 1904. He founded new schools and reorganized the existing ones, while he succeeded in granting diplomas to graduates of the Theological School of Jerusalem as well, though he did not ordain any priests. He confronted the Duchovnaye Missia (Spiritual Mission) a Russian organisation which practiced antihellenic propaganda; founded the Practical School in Joppa; and increased the circulation of academic books. In 1907 he took part, as representative of the Patriarchate of Jerusalem, in a meeting with the representative of the throne of the Ecumenical Patriarch of Constantinople, Basil, the Metropolitan bishop of Anchialos, and the Patriarch of Alexandria, Photius, concerning issues with the Archbishop of Cyprus. The ruling which at last decided the issue was based on a document which had been drafted by Metaxakis and which had been published in the Gazette of the Cypriot government. They published that document along with various dialogues that he that time with the Patriarch Photius of Alexandria in two publications of the Patriarchate of Alexandria, Ekklisiastikos Faros (Greek: Εκκλησιαστικός Φάρος, "Ecclesiastical Lighthouse") (Note: A likely reference to the Lighthouse of Alexandria, in the same vein as the reference to the Alexandrian theologian Pantaenus.) and Pantainos (Greek: Πανταἰνος). (Note: Latinised as Pantaenus.)

=== Metropolitan of Kition ===
In 1910, he was elected Metropolitan of Kition in the Church of Cyprus. He organized the Statutory Charter of the Church of Cyprus and founded the periodical Ekklesiastikos Kirix ("Ecclesiastical Herald"), which he continued to publish later on in Athens and in New York City. He established the Pancypriot Seminary in October of 1910, and the Commercial High School of Larnaca. In 1912–1913 he travelled to Athens where he collaborated with Ion Dragoumis and a commission of the Greek Ministry of Foreign Affairs to explore fundraising for issues which had arisen with the return of territories under the jurisdiction of the Ecumenical Patriarchate to Greece, Serbia, and Bulgaria while drafting a report on the return. Ιn articles in Ekklisiastiki Kirika in 1914 he would be opposed in every proposal put forward by the metropolitans of the newly-returned territories, for reasons of ethnic politics: they feared the diminution of the Ecumenical Patriarchate, in which he fulfilled the role of ethnarch. (Note: Greece, along with Serbia and Bulgaria, gained a number of territories from the Ottoman Empire after the Balkan Wars and the annexation of the Cretan State that had remained part of the jurisdiction of the patriarchate when their national autocephalous churches were formed in the nineteenth century. The Bulgarian Orthodox Church and Serbian Orthodox Church are now autocephalous patriarchates, but at the time (in all, from 1872–1945) the Bulgarian Exarchate that was in formal schism with Constantinople over jurisdictional issues; while the Serbian church was divided into the Patriarchate of Karlovci, the Metropolitanate of Belgrade, and Metropolitanate of Montenegro, roughly corresponding to the borders of the Kingdom of Serbia, Kingdom of Montenegro and the Austro-Hungarian Empire. See the above linked articles for more information To this day, thirty-six of the eighty-one dioceses of the Church of Greece in the "New Lands" while represented in the synod of the Church of Greece and administered as part of it "in stewardship", are yet nominally under the jurisdiction of the Ecumenical Patriarchate, acknowledging the patriarch as their primate (bishop) in the diptychs and retain right of appeal to him in disputes with other bishops.)

=== Leadership of autocephalous churches ===
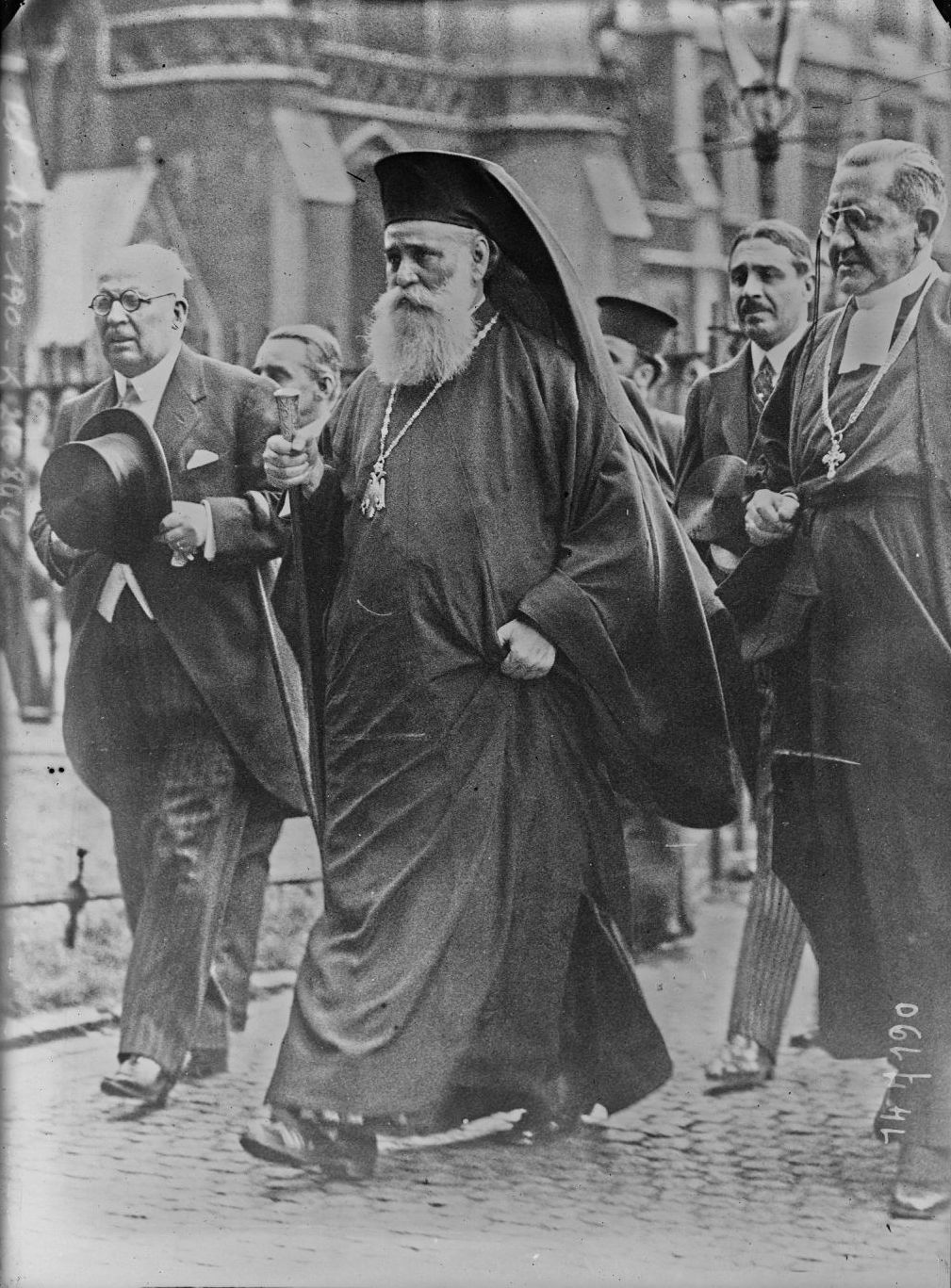
Meletios II, Pope and Patriarch of Alexandria, 1930

He was Metropolitan bishop of the Church of Greece in Athens (1918–1920) as Meletius III, after which he was elected Ecumenical Patriarch of Constantinople under the name Meletius IV from 1921 to 1923. He served as Greek Patriarch of Alexandria under the episcopal name Meletius II from 1926 to 1935.

As Ecumenical Patriarch, in 1921, Meletius declared that Anglican Holy Orders were valid, having preserved apostolic succession; following his statement, in 1922, the Synod of Constantinople affirmed Meletius' statement, conditionally declaring the validity of Anglican Holy Orders. The Living Church, an Anglo-Catholic newspaper focused on The Episcopal Church and the Anglican Communion, claimed this was, "the most momentous chapter in ecclesiastical history in a thousand years." As Patriarch of Alexandria, in 1930, he made the same declaration on behalf of the Greek Orthodox Patriarchate of Alexandria By 1946, the autocephalous Orthodox churches of Cyprus, Greece, Jerusalem, and Romania had also recognized the validity of Anglican Orders.

A known supporter of Greek prime minister Eleftherios Venizelos, he served as bishop in Cyprus, until he was elected Archbishop of Athens following the abdication of Constantine I of Greece, replacing Archbishop Theocletus I, a known royalist. Two years later, King Constantine I was restored to the throne, Archbishop Meletius was ousted, and former archbishop Theocletus I was reinstated. In 1921 during the Occupation of Constantinople he was elected Ecumenical Patriarch of Constantinople. He resigned in 1923 following the defeat of the Hellenic army in the Greco-Turkish War in 1919–1922.

Some years later he was elected Pope and Patriarch of Alexandria. He died in 1935.

== Notes ==
Eastern Orthodox Church titles
Preceded by Germanus V	Ecumenical Patriarch of Constantinople as Meletius IV; 1921 – 1923	Succeeded by Gregory VII
Preceded by Photius	Greek Patriarch of Alexandria as Meletius II; 1926 – 1935	Succeeded by Nicholas V
