= Patriarch Theodosius =

Patriarch Theodosius may refer to:

- Theodosius, Syriac Orthodox Patriarch of Jerusalem (f. 451–453)
- Theodosius, Greek Orthodox Patriarch of Jerusalem (r. 862–878)
- Theodosius Romanus, Syriac Orthodox Patriarch of Antioch (r. 887–896)
- Theodosius I, Ecumenical Patriarch of Constantinople (r. 1179–1183)
- Theodosius I, Patriarch of Alexandria (r. 535–536)
- Theodosius II, Greek Orthodox Patriarch of Alexandria (c. 12th century)
- Theodosius II, Ecumenical Patriarch of Constantinople (r. 1769–1773)
