= Theodosius II (disambiguation) =

Theodosius II was the eastern Roman emperor from 402 until 450.

Theodosius II or Theodosios II may also refer to:

- Theodosius II of Abkhazia, king 828–855
- Theodosius II of Alexandria, patriarch 12th century
- Teodósio II, Duke of Braganza, duke of Braganza (1583–1630) and father of John IV of Portugal
- Theodosius II of Constantinople, patriarch 1769–1773

== See also ==
- Theodosius (disambiguation), a given name, including a list of people with that name
