= Parios =

Parios (Πάριος; literally "one who comes from (the island and/or city of) Paros, a Parian") is a Greek family name. Notable people with this name include:

- Athanasios Parios (1722–1813), Greek hieromonk
- Yiannis Parios (born 1946 ), Greek vocalist
