= Cyril VI =

Cyril VI may refer to:

- Cyril VI Tanas (1680–1760), Patriarch of the Melkite Greek Catholic Church
- Pope Cyril VI of Alexandria (1902–1971), Pope and Patriarch of the Coptic Orthodox Church of Alexandria
- Ecumenical Patriarch Cyril VI of Constantinople (1769–1821), see Constantinople Massacre of 1821
