= Patriarch Meletius of Constantinople =

Patriarch Meletius of Constantinople may refer to:

- Meletius II of Constantinople, Ecumenical Patriarch in 1769
- Meletius III of Constantinople, Ecumenical Patriarch in 1845
- Meletius IV of Constantinople, Ecumenical Patriarch in 1921–1923
