= Gabriel IV of Constantinople =

Ecumenical Patriarch of Constantinople from 1780 to 1785

- Ecumenical Patriarch of Constantinople
- Church: Church of Constantinople
- Diocese: Constantinople
- See: Ecumenical Patriarchate
- Installed: 8 October 1780
- Term ended: 29 June 1785
- Predecessor: Sophronius II of Constantinople
- Successor: Procopius of Constantinople

Personal details
- Born: Smyrna, Ottoman Empire
- Died: 29 June 1785
- Buried: Church of the Asomatoi (Pammegiston Taxiarchon), Arnavutköy
- Denomination: Eastern Orthodox Church

Gabriel IV of Constantinople (Greek: Γαβριήλ; died 29 June 1785) served as Ecumenical Patriarch of Constantinople during the period 1780–1785.

== Biography ==
Gabriel was born in Smyrna and descended from an aristocratic family. He was bishop of the Ayvalık Islands and later metropolitan bishop of Ioannina until April 1771 when he became Metropolitan of Old Patras. He especially liked the ecclesiastic order and precedence.

In 1780, he was elected Ecumenical Patriarch of Constantinople. During his patriarchy, he restored Athanasios Parios, who had been deposed because of the dispute about the kollyva and the memorial service. In 1784, he published the Typikon of Mount Athos, which delimited the administrative and executive domains of its organs.

He died on 29 June 1785 and was buried in the same grave as his predecessor, Sophronius II of Constantinople, in the yard of the Church of the Asomatoi (Pammegiston Taxiarchon) in Arnavutköy.

== Bibliography ==
- Οικουμενικό Πατριαρχείο.
- Ιερά Μητρόπολις Πατρών: «Ο Οικουμενικός Πατριάρχης και η Πάτρα», άρθρο του ιστορικού Κώστα Ν. Τριανταφύλλου στην εφημερίδα «Πελοπόννησος» (19 October 2000).

Eastern Orthodox Church titles
Preceded by Sophorius II	Ecumenical Patriarch of Constantinople; 1780 – 1785	Succeeded by Procopius
