= Samuel of Constantinople =

Ecumenical Patriarch of Constantinople in 1763–1768 and 1773–1774

- Ecumenical Patriarch of Constantinople
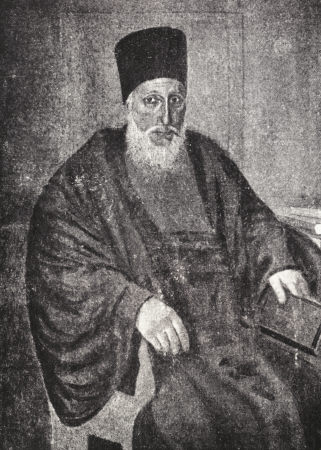
- 1907 depiction of Samuel
- Church: Church of Constantinople
- Diocese: Constantinople
- See: Ecumenical Patriarchate
- Installed: 24 May 1763; 17 November 1773
- Term ended: 5 November 1768; 24 December 1774
- Predecessor: Joannicius III of Constantinople; Theodosius II of Constantinople
- Successor: Meletius II of Constantinople; Sophronius II of Constantinople

Personal details
- Born: Skarlatos Chantzeris (Σκαρλάτος Χαντζερής); 1700 Constantinople
- Died: 10 May 1775 (aged 74–75) Heybeliada
- Buried: Church of Saint Nicholas, Heybeliada
- Denomination: Eastern Orthodox Church

Samuel of Constantinople (Greek: Σαμουήλ), lay name Skarlatos Chantzeris (Σκαρλᾶτος Χαντζερῆς; 1700 – 10 May 1775), served as Ecumenical Patriarch of Constantinople during the periods 1763–1768 and 1773–1774.

== Biography ==
He was born in 1700 in Constantinople. He studied in the Great School of the Nation. At a young age, he was ordained deacon, and later he became an archdeacon of the Patriarch Paisius II of Constantinople. He was elected metropolitan bishop of Derkoi in 1731 and Ecumenical Patriarch on 24 May 1763, even though he thought he was too old for this position.

During his patriarchy, he was occupied with the finances of the Patriarchate. He limited the expenses, restrained the fundraisers, and the procession of the "disk" five times per year and he repealed the old habit for priests and hieromonks to contribute in-kind (animals, eggs, etc.) to the Patriarchate. He reinforced education and he restored the authority of the Patriarchate. In 1767 Samuel abolished the autocephaly of the archbishops of Peć and Ohrid, whose jurisdiction had come to include large areas of Macedonia, Epirus, Thessaly, Albania, and Serbia, and placed them again under the jurisdiction of the Patriarchate of Constantinople.

On a social level, Samuel inveighed against the "slavery of the woman" and talked against the institution of dowry and commercial wedding. He decided to divide the patriarchal seal into four parts, three of which were given to synodic hierarchs. This way he emphasised the synodic administrative system of the Patriarchate, according to which there is shared responsibility and the arbitrariness of the Patriarch is limited.

His radical acts provoked reactions, which reached the point of forcing him to resign on 5 November 1768. He was exiled to Great Lavra of Mount Athos, but in 1770 he convinced the Ottoman government to allow him to return to his residence in Tarabya. After the resignation of Theodosius II of Constantinople, the Synod reelected Samuel Patriarch, against his will, on 17 November 1773.

This second patriarchy lasted about one year. During it he tried to solve the issue of the "Kollyvades", choosing a harsher stance than his predecessor. On 24 December 1774, he was exiled again to Mount Athos and later to Heybeliada, where he died on 10 May 1775. He was buried in the Church of Saint Nicholas in Heybeliada. It is rumored that the noblewoman Roxandra Karatza was Samuel's mistress.

== Bibliography ==
- Οικουμενικό Πατριαρχείο.
- Bakouros, Vasileios, Ο Οικουμενικός Πατριάρχης Σαμουήλ Α΄ Χαντζέρης ο βυζάντιος: ο βίος και το έργο του (1700–1775): εκκλησιαστικός ανθρωπισμός - νεοελληνικός διαφωτισμός, PhD dissertation, 1998.

Eastern Orthodox Church titles
Preceded by Joannicius III	Ecumenical Patriarch of Constantinople; 1763 – 1768	Succeeded by Meletius II
Preceded by Theodosius II	Ecumenical Patriarch of Constantinople; 1773 – 1774	Succeeded by Sophronius II
