= Patriarch Theodosius of Alexandria =

Patriarch Theodosius of Alexandria may refer to:

- Patriarch Theodosius I of Alexandria, Patriarch of Alexandria in 535–536
- Patriarch Theodosius II of Alexandria, Greek Patriarch of Alexandria in the 12th century
