= Patriarch Cyril VI =

Patriarch Cyril VI may refer to:

- Cyril VI Tanas, Patriarch of Antioch in 1724–1760
- Cyril VI of Constantinople, Ecumenical Patriarch of Constantinople in 1813–1818
- Pope Cyril VI of Alexandria, Pope of Alexandria & Patriarch of the See of St. Mark in 1959–1971
