= Patriarch Meletius II =

Patriarch Meletius II may refer to:

- Meletius II of Constantinople, Ecumenical Patriarch in 1768–1769
- Patriarch Meletius II of Alexandria, ruled in 1926–1935
