= Sophronius II of Constantinople =

Ecumenical Patriarch of Constantinople from 1774 to 1780

- Ecumenical Patriarch of Constantinople
- Church: Church of Constantinople
- Diocese: Constantinople
- See: Ecumenical Patriarchate
- Installed: 24 December 1774
- Term ended: 8 October 1780
- Predecessor: Samuel of Constantinople
- Successor: Gabriel IV of Constantinople

Personal details
- Born: Aleppo, Syria
- Died: 19 October 1780
- Buried: Church of the Asomatoi (Pammegiston Taxiarchon), Arnavutköy
- Denomination: Eastern Orthodox Church

Sophronius II of Constantinople (Greek: Σωφρόνιος; died 19 October 1780) served as Ecumenical Patriarch of Constantinople during the period 1775–1780 and, as Sophronius V (Σοφρώνιος Ε΄), Greek Orthodox Patriarch of Jerusalem in 1771–1774.

Before his elevation to the patriarchates of Jerusalem and Constantinople, he was a major Arabic-speaking Orthodox intellectual and churchman in the circle of Patriarch Sylvester of Antioch.

He was born in Aleppo, Syria. He served as metropolitan bishop of Ptolemais (of the Greek Orthodox Church of Jerusalem) and in 1771 he was elected Greek Orthodox Patriarch of Jerusalem as Sophronius V. In 1774, he was elected Ecumenical Patriarch of Constantinople as Sophronius II. During his reign, a Synod in Constantinople condemned the Kollyvades.

He was an educated and ascetic Patriarch and was especially preoccupied with education and the economics of the Patriarchates he ministered. He died on 19 October 1780 and was buried in the yard of the Church of the Asomatoi (Pammegiston Taxiarchon) in Arnavutköy.

== Early life and education ==
According to manuscript evidence discussed by Habib Ibrahim, Sophronios signed himself Sophronios ibn ʿĪsa al-Kilzī, indicating that he was from Kilis, near the Syrian border, and that his father’s name was ʿĪsa. This differs from the brief identification in some modern summaries that describe him as being from Aleppo. His exact birth date is unknown, but Ibrahim suggests a birth around 1705, based on the chronology of his early service and later ecclesiastical career.

The details of his education are not fully documented, but he appears to have had a strong command of Arabic from an early stage and at least some knowledge of Ottoman Turkish. He later acquired Greek more fully, probably during his years in the Romanian Principalities while accompanying Patriarch Sylvester.

== Service under Sylvester of Antioch ==
Sophronios first appears as a secretary and deacon in the service of Patriarch Sylvester of Antioch. He is attested in manuscripts as the translator of a letter by Meletius, former bishop of Heraclea, and of another polemical text which he states he translated in Bucharest on 20 June 1730.

He appears to have accompanied Sylvester during the patriarch’s travels in Greece and the Romanian Principalities and later played an important role in the administration of the Antiochian patriarchate. Ibrahim identifies him as one of Sylvester’s chief collaborators in Arabic and Ottoman Turkish correspondence, before this role later passed to Mūsā Ṭrābulsī.

By 1740 he was still being described as a deacon, but by March 1741 he appears as a priest. During this period he was also active as a translator of Greek Orthodox theological and polemical works into Arabic and as a corrector of liturgical texts.

== Bishop of Acre ==
Sophronios later became bishop of Acre, probably in the early 1740s. In this role he was part of wider Orthodox efforts to resist the expansion of Catholic influence in Acre, Sidon, and Aleppo. He was closely associated with Arabic anti-Catholic polemics and pastoral efforts aimed at strengthening the Orthodox population.

In 1750 he was sent by Sylvester to Aleppo, but conflict soon followed. According to the evidence assembled by Ibrahim from Arabic sources and correspondence, he became embroiled in local disputes, especially with Catholic clergy. After arrests, counter-accusations, and his own imprisonment, he was released on 18 January 1752 and withdrew to Constantinople. Sylvester continued trying for some time to have him reinstated, but without success.

== Retreat and later patriarchates ==
By August 1753 Sophronios was in the Mega Reuma district of Constantinople. Ibrahim suggests that, after the Aleppo affair, he largely withdrew from active public controversy for about fifteen years.

After the death of Sylvester of Antioch in 1766, some Damascenes wished Sophronios to succeed him as patriarch of Antioch, but he refused. Five years later, however, he accepted election as Patriarch of Jerusalem, taking the name Sophronius V. In 1774 he was elected Ecumenical Patriarch of Constantinople as Sophronius II.

He died on 19 October 1780 while patriarch of Constantinople.

== Works ==
Sophronios was one of the most important Arabic Orthodox translators and polemicists of the 18th century. Ibrahim summarizes both his original works and his translations.

Among his original works are:

- Kitāb midrār sayl al-maṭar fī ṭafī nār al-maṭhar
- Jawāb Ṣufrūniyūs muṭrān ʿAkkā ilā ahl Ḥayfā al-munshaqqīn
- Aqwāl muṣarraḥa jalīya wāḍiḥa fī ri’āsat al-bābā
- Sharḥ mukhtaṣar fī irshād wa-dalālat al-qāri’ fī annahu kayfa yaqra’ kutub al-ābā’ al-qiddīsīn
- Fī anna kathīrīn min al-bābāwāt akhṭa’ū fī al-īmān al-urthūḏuksī
- a diatribe against a patriarch associated with Dayr al-Mukhalliṣ
- Maqāla wajīza fī bāb al-sabʿat asrār

His translations include:

- a letter by Meletius of Heraclea
- a text on the sayings of the Pharisees against Jesus
- Nektarios of Jerusalem’s anti-papal work, translated in 1739 under the Arabic title Kitāb jalā’ al-abṣār min ghishā’ al-akdār
- an anti-purgatory treatise
- an abridged catechism
- Eustratios Argentis’s work against the use of azymes
- Athanasios of Alexandria’s In Historiam Melchisedec

Some of these translations were later printed under the patronage of Sylvester in Iaşi and Bucharest, including Nektarios’s work in 1746.

== Significance ==
Modern scholarship has emphasized that Sophronios should not be viewed only through his later patriarchates. Before becoming patriarch, he was already an important figure in the Arab Orthodox intellectual revival linked to Sylvester of Antioch, active in translation, manuscript culture, liturgical correction, and anti-Catholic controversy.

His career also illustrates the mobility of 18th-century Orthodox churchmen across Kilis, Antioch, Jerusalem, the Romanian Principalities, Acre, Aleppo, and Constantinople.

Sophronios of Kilis / Sophronius II of Constantinople has been researched by the TYPARABIC project team (AdG 2019 – Horizon 2020 – Contract no. 883219).

== Bibliography ==
- Οικουμενικό Πατριαρχείο.

Religious titles
| Preceded by Samuel (2) | Ecumenical Patriarch of Constantinople; 1774 – 1780 | Succeeded by Gabriel IV |

| Preceded by Ephram II | Greek Orthodox Patriarch of Jerusalem; 1771–1774 | Succeeded by Abraham II |
