= Gerasimus III of Constantinople =

Ecumenical Patriarch of Constantinople from 1794 to 1797

- Ecumenical Patriarch of Constantinople
- Church: Church of Constantinople
- Diocese: Constantinople
- See: Ecumenical Patriarchate
- Installed: 3 March 1794
- Term ended: 19 April 1797
- Predecessor: Neophytus VII of Constantinople
- Successor: Gregory V of Constantinople

Personal details
- Born: Cyprus
- Died: After 1797 Tarabiye
- Denomination: Eastern Orthodox Church

Gerasimus III of Constantinople (Greek: Γεράσιμος, Gerasimos; died after 1797) was Ecumenical Patriarch of Constantinople from 1794 to 1797.

He descended from Cyprus. In 1762, he was elected metropolitan bishop of Vize, in 1783 of İzmit, and in 1791 of Derkoi. On 3 March 1794, he was elected Ecumenical Patriarch, succeeding Neophytus VII of Constantinople.

During his patriarchy, Gerasimus III regulated many ecclesiastic issues. One of which was setting an age requirement in the ordainment of clerics in 1795, prohibiting the ordainment of deacon under 25 years old and presbyter under 30 years old.

On 19 April 1797, he resigned and retired to Tarabiye, where he died a while later.

== Notes and references ==
Eastern Orthodox Church titles
Preceded by Neophytus VII	Ecumenical Patriarch of Constantinople; 1794 – 1797	Succeeded by Gregory V
