= Theodosius II of Constantinople =

Ecumenical Patriarch of Constantinople from 1769 to 1773

- Ecumenical Patriarch of Constantinople
- Church: Church of Constantinople
- Diocese: Constantinople
- See: Ecumenical Patriarchate
- Installed: 11 April 1769
- Term ended: 16 November 1773
- Predecessor: Meletius II of Constantinople
- Successor: Samuel of Constantinople

Personal details
- Born: Christianopoulos (Χριστιανόπουλος) Crete
- Died: After 1776 Constantinople
- Denomination: Eastern Orthodox Church

Theodosius II (Greek: Θεοδόσιος), lay surname Christianopoulos (Χριστιανόπουλος), served as the Ecumenical Patriarch of Constantinople between 1769 and 1773.

== Biography ==
He was born in Crete, where he was father superior. He served as chief of the Church of St. George in Constantinople. Later he was elected bishop of Ierissos and Mount Athos, and in 1767 metropolitan bishop of Thessaloniki. He was elected Patriarch on 11 April 1769, at a time when Christians were persecuted after the withdrawal of the Russian forces following the Orlov Revolt. Many Christians had helped the Russians, following the exhortations of the former Patriarch Seraphim II of Constantinople and other clerics. Theodosius II made efforts to save the monasteries of Mount Athos from demolition, he freed prisoners, he supported schools and monasteries and, with cooperation with the Patriarch of Jerusalem Sophronius V of Jerusalem, he managed to keep the Holy Land under the jurisdiction of the Eastern Orthodox Church. Lastly, he tried to give a conciliatory solution to the issue of the Kollyvades of Mount Athos.

Theodosius II was forced to resign on 16 November 1773, following the machinations of the Metropolitan of Prousa, Meletius. He retired to the Kamariotissa Monastery in Heybeliada. In 1776, having completely lost his sight, he returned to Constantinople, where he resided until his death.

== Bibliography ==
- Οικουμενικό Πατριαρχείο.
- Διονύσιος Δ. Βαλαής (D. D. Valais), Ο Μητροπολίτης Θεσσαλονίκης Θεοδόσιος Β΄ (Theodosius II of Constantinople) (1762–1769), Επιστημονική Επετηρίδα της Θεολογικής Σχολής του Α.Π.Θ., Νέα Σειρά, Τμήμα Θεολογίας, Τιμητικό Αφιέρωμα στον ομότιμο καθηγητή Ιωάννη Χρ. Ταρνανίδη (Scientific Annals of the Theological School of the Aristotle University of Thessaloniki, New Series, Theology Department, Honorary Tribute to Professor Emeritus J. C. Tarnanidis), 17 (2007–2008), p. 15–46.

Eastern Orthodox Church titles
Preceded by Meletius II	Ecumenical Patriarch of Constantinople; 1769 – 1773	Succeeded by Samuel (2)
