= Neophytus VII of Constantinople =

Ecumenical Patriarch of Constantinople from 1789 to 1794 and from 1798 to 1801

- Ecumenical Patriarch of Constantinople
- Church: Church of Constantinople
- Diocese: Constantinople
- See: Ecumenical Patriarchate
- Installed: 1 May 1789; 19 December 1798
- Term ended: 1 March 1794; 17 June 1801
- Predecessor: Procopius of Constantinople; Gregory V of Constantinople
- Successor: Gerasimus III of Constantinople; Callinicus V of Constantinople

Personal details
- Born: Smyrna
- Died: After 1801
- Denomination: Eastern Orthodox Church

Neophytus VII of Constantinople (Neophytos VII Greek: Νεόφυτος; died after 1801) was Ecumenical Patriarch of Constantinople during the periods 1789–1794 and 1798–1801.

== Biography ==
Neophytus was born in Smyrna. He studied in the Evangelical School of Smyrna, where he was classmates with Nicodemus the Hagiorite and Adamantios Korais. He was an especially educated man and was against the simplification of religious texts, as he thought that something like that would lead to their vulgarisation.

He served as great archdeacon of the Patriarchate and in May 1771 he was elected metropolitan bishop of Maroneia. On 1 May 1789, he succeeded Procopius of Constantinople on the Ecumenical throne, with some concerns about how canonical his election was. Even though his reign is considered worthy, he had to resign on 1 March 1794 and retired to Heybeliada and later to Rhodes, Patmos and Mount Athos. He was reelected Patriarch on 19 December 1798, but on 17 June 1801 he resigned again and was exiled to Mount Athos.

During his reign, the philosophy teacher Christodoulos Pamplekis was excommunicated, while the Great School of the Nation was reconstituted and many schools were founded. With a canonical arrangement, he condemned pantheism, while a synodic decision condemned the book "Περί συνεχούς μεταλήψεως", written by the former metropolitan bishop of Corinth, Macarius of Corinth. He re-founded after 413 years the Metropolis of Corfu and blessed, with the permission of the Sublime Porte, the new flag of the United States of the Ionian Islands in the Church of St. George. During his lifetime, and after many discussions, the translation and publication the Canon of the Eastern Orthodox Church in Demotic Greek was finally approved. Consequently, Christopher's "Κανονικόν" and Nicodemus the Hagiorite's "Πηδάλιον" were published, the latter also publishing "Μέγα Ευχολόγιον" in Constantinople. With his permission, John IV of Constantinople's Canon was also published by the Patriarchal Press.

== Bibliography ==
- Οικουμενικό Πατριαρχείο.
- Εγκυκλοπαίδεια Μείζονος Ελληνισμού.
- Καρύδης, Σπύρος Χρ (2009). "Η χειρόγραφη εκδοχή της εγκυκλίου του πρώην Κωνσταντινουπόλεως Νεοφύτου Ζ' (1802) για τις προσθήκες στην α' έκδοση του Πηδαλίου". Ο Ερανιστής. 27. Όμιλος Μελέτης του Ελληνικού Διαφωτισμού: 259–262. doi:10.12681/er.94.

Eastern Orthodox Church titles
Preceded by Procopius	Ecumenical Patriarch of Constantinople; 1789 – 1794	Succeeded by Gerasimus III
Preceded by Gregory V	Ecumenical Patriarch of Constantinople; 1798 – 1801	Succeeded by Callinicus V
