= Matrona of Chios =

Christian Saint

Saint Saint Matrona of Chios
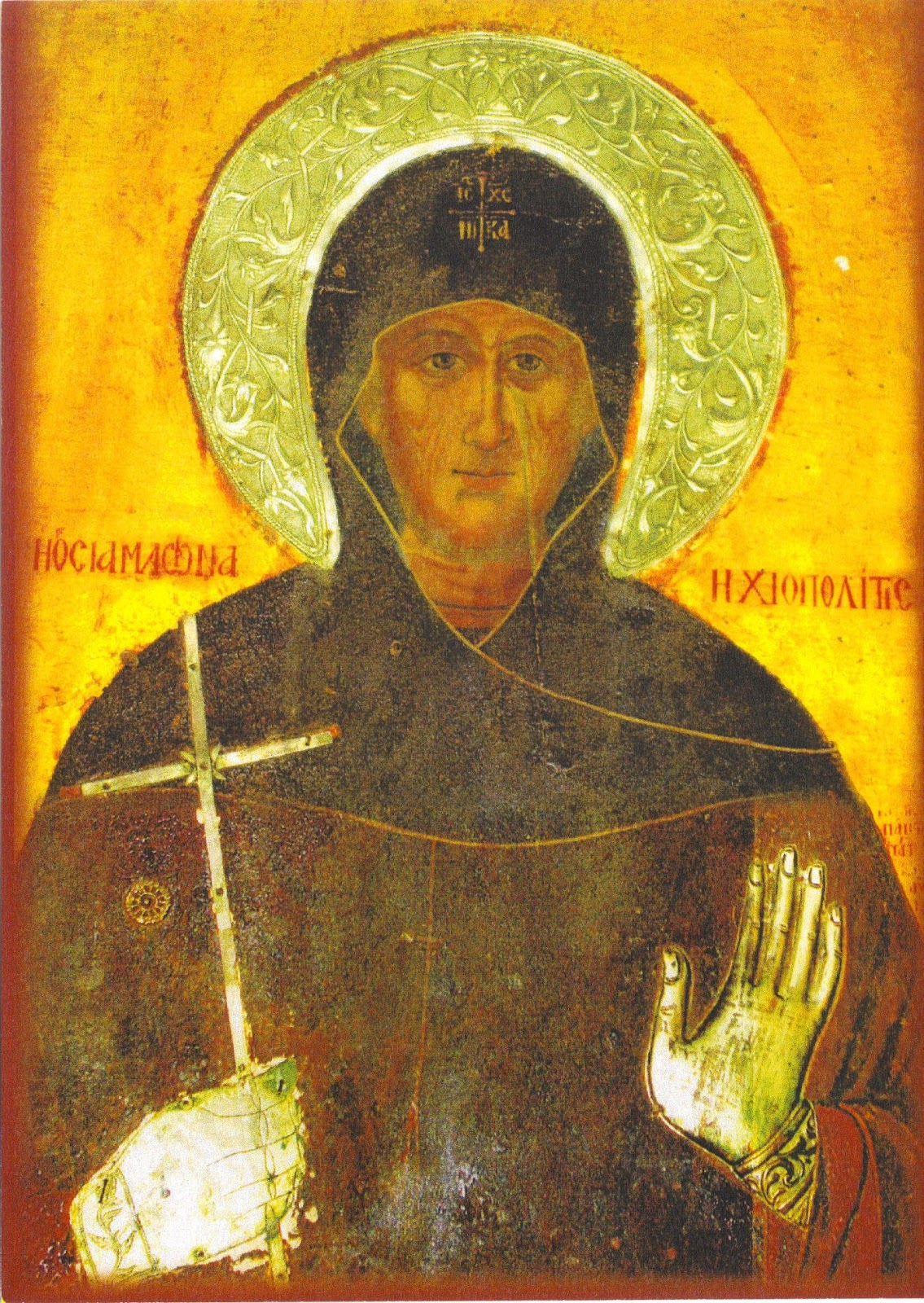
- Saint Matrona of Chios, Greek icon
- Born: c. 15th Century AD; Volissos, Chios
- Died: c. 15th Century AD; Katavasis, Chios
- Venerated in: Eastern Orthodox Church
- Major shrine: Church of Saint Matrona, Katavasis, Chios
- Feast: 20 October; 15 July (Finding the head of Saint Matrona)

Saint Matrona of Chios (Greek: Οσία Ματρώνα η Χιοπολίτις), was born during the 15th century in the village of Volissos on the island of Chios, Greece. This is the same village in which St. Markella was martyred in 1462. The Church celebrates her memory on October 20, and the finding of her head on July 15.

== Life ==
Saint Matrona was born in the village of Volissos on Chios sometime in the fourteenth century. Her parents, Leon and Anna, were highly respected and well-to-do Christians. Mary was the youngest of seven children. From her youth, she showed an interest in monasticism. When the time came for her parents to arrange her marriage, she refused because she wanted to remain a virgin. To avoid this marriage, she left Volissos and went to an area overlooking the village, called Katavasis, where there was a women's monastery. Her parents searched everywhere to find her. After locating her, they convinced her to return home. Mary complied with her parents' wishes, except for one—she refused to wed. Her parents, seeing that she still desired to lead a monastic life, gave her their consent to pursue her ambition.

When Mary's parents died, she gave much of her inheritance to the poor and spent the rest building a monastery in the Palaiókastro quarter of the town of Chios. At this point Mary's name was changed to Matrona.

Matrona surpassed the other nuns in her devotion, spirituality, and understanding. Her sincerity convinced other girls to come to this monastery and lead the same type of life. The church itself was small, and so the abbess agreed with Matrona's plan to enlarge it and to build cells for the nuns. Any remaining farmland and personal belongings Matrona sold, and the monastery built a public bath with the money received from this sale so that the poor and wayfarers could bathe. These baths were very common at this time. After this, the renovation of the church began. When the church was completed (with the help of St. Artemios, to whom it was dedicated), the abbess of the monastery died. The nuns then elected Matrona as the new abbess. Matrona was revered throughout Chios for her virtuous life and holiness. She showed charity to the poor, and was able to heal the sick.

After these events, St. Matrona dreamt of her own death. She suffered from an illness for seven days. In the seven days she advised the other nuns as a mother would advise her children. She died sometime before 1455. She was buried in the monastery's church, in which she had spent the greater part of her life. To honor this great saint, Miracles are said to have occurred after her death. Many people with all manner of afflictions came to the church and were cured.

In the village of Katavasis, there was a church built to honor the place where St. Matrona had first started her spiritual struggles. Later, a larger church was built and the smaller one was used as a cemetery chapel.

== Monastery of St. Matrona ==
The Holy Monastery of St. Matrona was built by the noble Roidis in 1470 near the village of Mesa Didima. He originally intended to build a summer villa; however, St. Matrona appeared to him in a dream and instructed him to build the monastery instead. His sisters were the first two nuns to enter the monastery. The abbot of the monastery during the Turkish Occupation was the Holy Nikephoros of Chios. Nikiforos wrote the 24 Hymns of Agia Matrona. Today, four nuns dwell in the monastery. The monastery celebrates the saint's feast day on October 20 each year.

== Sources ==
- This article is derived in whole or in part from Matrona of Chios at OrthodoxWiki, which is dually licensed under CC-By-SA and GFDL. All relevant terms must be followed.
