= Athanasios Parios =

Saint Athanasios Parios
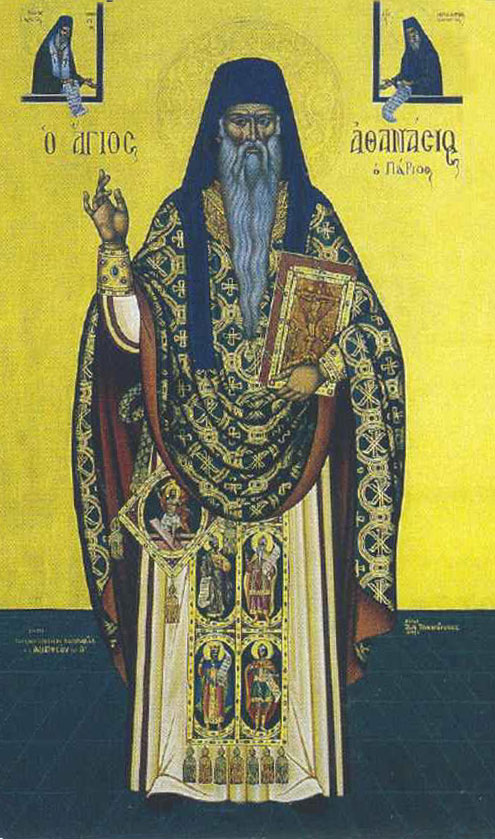
- Greek Icon of Saint Athanasios Parios
- Born: 1722; Kostos, Paros
- Died: June 24, 1813 (age 90); Hermitage of St. George, Chios
- Venerated in: Eastern Orthodox Church
- Canonized: 1995
- Major shrine: Kostos, Paros; Church of the Naxian Saints, Naxos.
- Feast: June 24; First Sunday of September (with the other Saints of Paros and Naxos)
- Attributes: Long white beard, vested as a Priest, holding a Gospel book.

Athanasios Parios (Greek: Ἀθανάσιος Πάριος; 1722–1813) was a Greek hieromonk who was a notable theologian, philosopher, educator, and hymnographer of his time, and one of the "Teachers of the Nation" during the Modern Greek Enlightenment. He was the second leader of the Kollyvades Movement, succeeding Neophytos Kausokalyvites (1713–1784). He also authored the lives of various saints. Athanasios was born in Kostos, a small village of Paros, in the year 1722 and died in Chios in 1813. He is commemorated by the Greek Orthodox Church on June 24.

Despite this, modern Greek critics consider him a reactionary Orthodox fundamentalist, enemy of the Western European ideas of the French Revolution, opponent of Rigas Feraios and Adamantios Korais.

== Life ==
In 1722, Parios was born in the village of Kostos, on the island of Paros. (Some sources give 1721, others range from 1723 to 1725. However, the plaque outside his church in Kostos lists 1722 as his birth year).

On the island of Paros he received instruction in the "common letters." Desiring higher education, he left his parents and his native place and went to Smyrna, to study at the Greek school of that city. The school was founded in 1717, and was later named the Evangelical School, and became famous. He resided in Smyrna for six years.

In 1752, he ent to Mount Athos and enrolled in the Athonite Academy, where he studied under Neophytos Kausokalyvites and Eugenios Voulgaris. He later studied at Corfu under Nikephoros Theotokis.

From 1767–1770, he taught at Thessaloniki, after which he returned to the Athonite School to become director.

In 1776, he was condemned as a heretic, defrocked, and excommunicated by Patriarch Sophronios II and the Holy Synod of Constantinople.

In 1781, he successfully defended himself before Patriarch Gabriel IV and the Holy Synod, and restored to communion and the priesthood

From 1788–1811, he was the Principal of the School in Chios.

At the age of 90, he withdrew to the cell of St. George the Refston and died there on June 24, 1813.

== Relations ==
- Athanasios (d. September 8, 1774). Athanasios was from the town of Koulakia, near Thessaloniki, and was provided a good education, studying under Athanasios Parios in Thessaloniki. He later went to Mount Athos to the Vatopedi Monastery where he became a monk. Athanasius later was martyred for Christ, not willing to convert to the Islamic faith. He was hanged and buried near the Church of St. Paraskeve.
- Minas Minoidis (d. France). Minas was a student of Athanasios Parios. He taught rhetoric and philosophy in Serres and Thessaloniki; he also taught ancient Greek and literature in Paris. He was an interpreter at the French Ministry of Foreign Affairs and a Chevalier of the Legion of Honour. Minas was militantly opposed to Korais' ideas on language, his most severe and unfair critic. He was a fervent supporter of the fight for Greek independence. He discovered the verse "Myths of Vavrios" in a Mount Athos manuscript.
- Ierotheos Dendrinos and Christodoulos, Doctor of Philosophy.
- St. Nikephoros of Chios (May 1), was sent to the city of Chios to be educated in its schools by Gabriel Astrakaris. Nikephoros remained close to this priest throughout the period of his education, where he developed a love for learning, and a respect for those who taught others. He also met St. Athanasius Parios, who was the director of the school in the city of Chios.

== Veneration ==
He was canonized as a saint in the Orthodox Church in 1995.

== Works ==
- 1785 - Antipapas, analyses the work of Saint Mark of Ephesus.
- 1797 - Paternal Teaching, written by Athanasios, but published under the name of Patriarch Anthimos of Jerusalem.
- 1798 - Christian Apologies
- 1787 - Rhetorical Pragmatics and Metaphysics
- 1802 - A Response to the Irrational Zeal of the Philosophers Coming from Europe
- 1806 - Epitome, a theology textbook, which was a collaboration with Saint Makarios of Corinth.
