= Jeremias IV of Constantinople =

Ecumenical Patriarch of Constantinople from 1809 to 1813

- Ecumenical Patriarch of Constantinople
- Church: Church of Constantinople
- Diocese: Constantinople
- See: Ecumenical Patriarchate
- Installed: 23 April 1809
- Term ended: 4 March 1813
- Predecessor: Callinicus V of Constantinople
- Successor: Cyril VI of Constantinople

Personal details
- Born: Crete
- Died: 5 March 1824 Mytilene, Greece
- Denomination: Eastern Orthodox Church

Jeremias IV of Constantinople (Greek: Ἰερεμίας; died 5 March 1824) was the Ecumenical Patriarch of Constantinople during the period 1809–1813.

He came from Crete. He became protosyncellus of the Ecumenical Patriarchate and was later elected metropolitan bishop of Mytilene (1783–1809). In 1809, he was elected Ecumenical Patriarch of Constantinople.

Even though of average education, he is considered a successful Patriarch, as he was prudent with remarkable administrative skills. He was also characterised as a remarkably brave protector of the interests of the church. On 4 March 1813, he resigned for health reasons. He retired to Mytilene, where he died on 5 March 1824.

== Bibliography ==
- Ecumenical Patriarchate

Eastern Orthodox Church titles
Preceded by Callinicus V (2)	Ecumenical Patriarch of Constantinople; 1809 - 1813	Succeeded by Cyril VI
