= Procopius of Constantinople =

Ecumenical Patriarch of Constantinople from 1785 to 1789

- Ecumenical Patriarch of Constantinople
- Church: Church of Constantinople
- Diocese: Constantinople
- See: Ecumenical Patriarchate
- Installed: 29 June 1785
- Term ended: 30 April 1789
- Predecessor: Gabriel IV of Constantinople
- Successor: Neophytus VII of Constantinople

Personal details
- Born: Prokopios Pelekasis (Προκόπιος Πελεκάσης); 1730 Sitsova, Messenia
- Died: 13 March 1812 (aged about 82) Sitsova, Messenia
- Buried: Monastery of Mardakios
- Denomination: Eastern Orthodox Church

Procopius of Constantinople (Greek: Προκόπιος), original surname Pelekasis (Πελεκάσης; 1730 – 13 March 1812) served as Ecumenical Patriarch of Constantinople during the period 1785–1789.

== Biography ==
Procopius was born in Sitsova of Messenia in 1730. When he was 12 years old, he followed his older brother, Neophytus, metropolitan bishop of Ganos and Chora (Eastern Thrace), who helped him finish basic education. Later, he ordained him deacon and presbyter, and when Neophytus died in 1759, Procopius succeeded him, after request of the people of the metropolis.

Procopius remained in this metropolis for 11 years, until 1770, when he was transferred to the Metropolis of Smyrna, which he managed to pacify after the disruption caused by his predecessor, Kallinikos. Procopius ordained Georgios Angelopoulos deacon and even made him protosyncellus of the metropolis; Angelopoulos would go on to become a Patriarch and a Saint, under the name of Gregory V of Constantinople. During his reign, many churches were built, though it wasn't possible to get the permission for the construction of the church of Samaritan woman at the well.

During the period 1780–1782, Procopius was a member of the Synod of the Ecumenical Patriarchate and resided in Constantinople.

On 29 June 1785, he was elected Patriarch of Constantinople. He was ascetic, modest and hard-working. He dealt with the economic and administrative issues of the Patriarchate, trying to limit the external influence in ecclesiastic issues. Thus, he clashed with the ruler of Moldavia, Alexander Mavrocordatos Firaris, who had elected the metropolitan bishop of Moldavia, Romanos Leontas, on his own.

In 1787, the second Russo-Turkish War broke out and the Sultan forced Procopius to renounce the revolutionary movements, as well as gather more taxes and people to reinforce the Ottoman Forces. With his acquiescent stance, he caused reactions and made enemies. With decree from the Sultan, Selim III, he was forced to resign on 30 April 1789 and was exiled to the Great Lavra in Mount Athos.

In 1797, he returned to his home village. Where he resided in a monastic cell next to the Church of Saint Nicholas of Sitsova. Procopius died in 1812 and was buried next to the church. Later, his bones were transported to the Monastery of Mardakios, after the cares of the metropolitan bishop of Messenia, Meletios Sakellaropoulos. When Chrysostomos Daskalakis was the metropolitan of Messenia, he unveiled a bust of his predecessor.

== Bibliography ==
- Οικουμενικό Πατριαρχείο.
- Encyclopaedia Papyrus Larousse Britannica, 2007, vol. 43, p. 650.
- Encyclopaedia of the Hellenic World.

Eastern Orthodox Church titles
Preceded by Gabriel IV	Ecumenical Patriarch of Constantinople; 1785 – 1789	Succeeded by Neophytus VII
