= Cyril VI of Constantinople =

Encumenical Patriarch of Constantinople from 1813 to 1818

- Ecumenical Patriarch of Constantinople
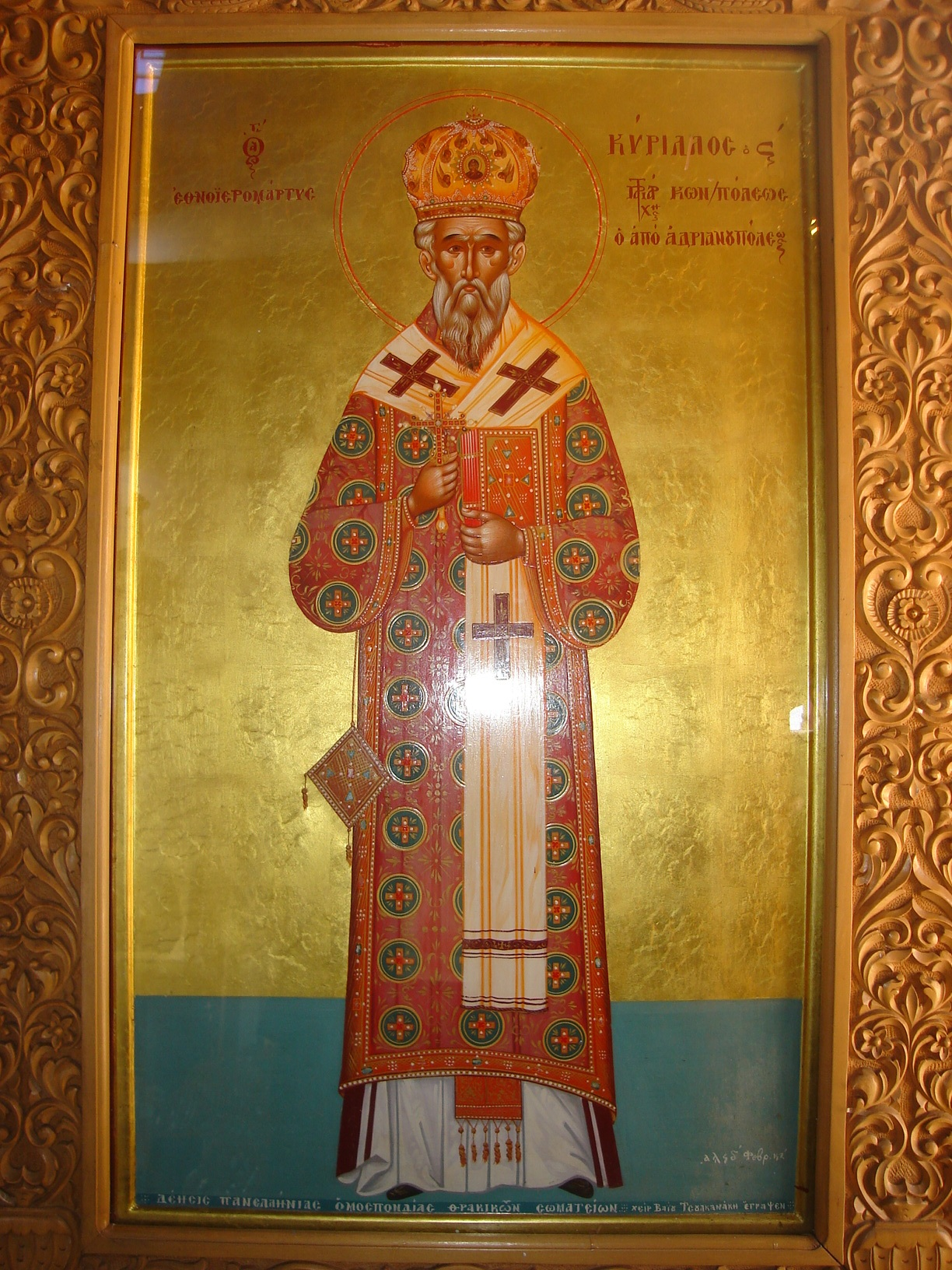
- Church: Church of Constantinople
- Diocese: Constantinople
- See: Ecumenical Patriarchate
- Installed: 4 March 1813
- Term ended: 13 December 1818
- Predecessor: Jeremias IV of Constantinople
- Successor: Gregory V of Constantinople

Personal details
- Born: Konstantinos Serpentzoglou (Κωνσταντίνος Σερπεντζόγλου); 1769 Adrianople (Edirne)
- Died: 18 April 1821 (aged 51–52) Adrianople (Edirne)
- Buried: Pythio
- Denomination: Eastern Orthodox Church
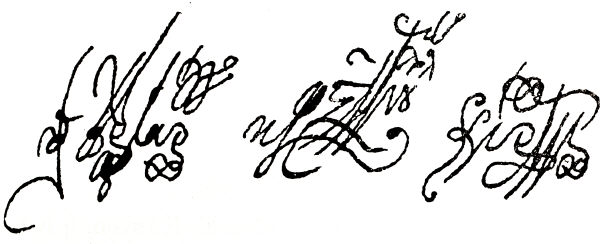
- Signature

Cyril VI of Constantinople (Greek: Κύριλλος), lay name Konstantinos Serpentzoglou (Κωνσταντῖνος Σερπεντζόγλου), was the Ecumenical Patriarch of Constantinople between the years 1813 and 1818.

== Early life, education, and ecclesiastical career ==
He was born in 1769 in Edirne, where he finished school. He was a smart and good student. He was put under the protection of the local metropolitan bishop (and later Ecumenical Patriarch) Callinicus V of Constantinople, who ordained him deacon in 1791 and hired him as a secretary. In 1801, when Callinicus V was elected Patriarch, he was appointed great archdeacon of the Patriarchate. From that position, he was especially occupied with the reorganisation of the Great School of the Nation, which was then moved to Kuruçeşme.

In September 1803 he was elected Metropolitan bishop of Konya, serving as such for seven years. There, he worked hard for the establishment of schools, the funding of impecunious students, the distribution of books and the general education. In 1810 he was moved to the Metropolis of Edirne. On 4 March 1813, after the resignation of Jeremias IV of Constantinople, he was elected Ecumenical Patriarch.

== Ecumenical Patriarch ==
As Ecumenical Patriarch, past the special interest he showed for the development of education, he founded a music school and published many books, mainly religious. He fixed the economical problems of the Patriarchate and reopened the Patriarchal Press and the Great School of the Nation. It is speculated that he was an advisor of Filiki Eteria. Moreover, it is thought that the Sultan Mahmud II made him resign, which happened on 13 December 1818.

== Execution ==
After his resignation, he retired to Edirne. When the Greek War of Independence broke out, his name was included in the decree of the Sultan where the command to execute 30 priests and kodjabashis of Edirne was given. He was executed, on 18 April 1821, by hanging in the gate of the Metropolis and his body stayed hanging for three days (the first time the rope broke and the Ottomans considered it a superstition) and was later thrown in the Maritsa. Later, his relic was found by a villager and was buried. His grave still exists in the yard of a house in the village of Pythio, next to the Maritsa river.

== Veneration ==
He was recognised as a saint in 1993 by the Holy Synod of the Church of Greece and he is honored on 18 April or carried on Thomas Sunday. He was canonised by The Ecumenical Patriarchate on 11 February 2022.

== Bibliography ==
- Cyril, Patriarch of Constantinople.
- Holy people of the eparchy of Didymoteichos.
- Anexartitos Serron.

Eastern Orthodox Church titles
| Preceded by Jeremias IV | Ecumenical Patriarch of Constantinople; 1813 – 1818 | Succeeded by Gregory V (3) |
