= Gregory V of Constantinople =

Ecumenical Patriarch of Constantinople

Saint Gregory V of Constantinople
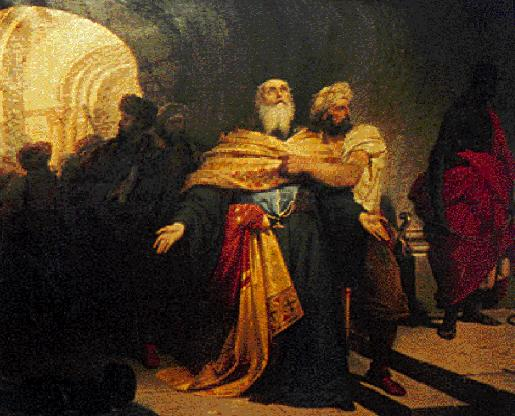
- Patriarch Gregory V shortly before his execution, as depicted by Nikiphoros Lytras

Ecumenical Patriarch of Constantinople, Hieromartyr
- Born: Georgios Angelopoulos; 1746; Dimitsana, Ottoman Empire
- Died: 10 April 1821; Constantinople
- Venerated in: Eastern Orthodox Church
- Major shrine: Metropolitan Cathedral of Athens
- Feast: 10 April
- Controversy: Elected in 1797 but deported to Mount Athos, Ottoman Empire in 1798, reelected 1806 and exiled to Prince Islands then Mount Athos in 1810, reelected 1818 and executed on 10 April 1821.

Saint Gregory V of Constantinople
- Ecumenical Patriarch of Constantinople
- Church: Church of Constantinople
- In office: 19 April 1797 – 18 December 1798; 23 September 1806 – 10 September 1808; 14 December 1818 – 10 April 1821
- Predecessor: Gerasimus III of Constantinople; Callinicus V of Constantinople; Cyril VI of Constantinople
- Successor: Neophytus VII of Constantinople; Callinicus V of Constantinople; Eugenius II of Constantinople

Personal details
- Denomination: Eastern Orthodoxy

Gregory V of Constantinople (Greek: Γρηγόριος; 1746 – 10 April 1821), born Georgios Angelopoulos (Γεώργιος Αγγελόπουλος), was Ecumenical Patriarch of Constantinople from 1797 to 1798, from 1806 to 1808, and from 1818 to 1821. He was responsible for much restoration work to the Patriarchal Cathedral of St George, which had been badly damaged by fire in 1738.

== Biography ==
Born in Dimitsana, he studied in Athens for two years beginning in 1756, then moved to Smyrna for five more years of study. Tonsured as a monk with the name "Gregory" at the monastery in Strofades, he then studied at Patmiada School. Returning to Smyrna, he was ordained to the diaconate by Metropolitan Procopius of Constantinople.

In 1785, when Procopius was elected Patriarch of Constantinople, Gregory was consecrated as Metropolitan of Smyrna. In 1797, the Holy Synod elected Gregory V as Patriarch of Constantinople upon the resignation of Gerasimus III of Constantinople.

The following year Gregory V was deposed as patriarch. He was sent to the Monastery of Iviron on Mount Athos. On 23 September 1806, the Holy Synod elected him as patriarch for a second time. He was deposed again in 1810. This time he was sent first to the Princes' Islands, and then later to Mount Athos.

On 14 December 1818, the Holy Synod elected Gregory V patriarch for a third time. At the onset of the Greek War of Independence, as Ethnarch of the Orthodox millet, Gregory V was blamed by Ottoman Sultan Mahmud II for his inability to suppress the Greek uprising. This was in spite of the fact that Gregory V had condemned the Greek revolutionary activities in order to protect the Greeks of Constantinople from such reprisals by the Ottoman Turks.

== Death ==
After the Greek rebels scored several successes against the Ottoman forces in the Peloponnese, these reprisals came. Directly after celebrating the solemn Easter Liturgy on 10 April 1821, Gregory V was accosted by the Ottomans and, still in full liturgical vestments, was taken out of the Patriarchal Cathedral. He was then summarily executed, his corpse being left for two days on the main gate of the Patriarchate compound, all by order of the Sultan.

=== Aftermath ===
According to several accounts, Sultan Mahmud II charged the Jewish community of Constantinople with disposing of Gregory V's body — along with those of other executed prelates — who dragged it through the streets and threw it into the sea. The most reliable accounts understand this to have been done unwillingly, as a kind of degradation. Some unreliable polemics also exist from around the time that rumor that the act was a form of voluntary Jewish communal retribution against the Christian community.

These occurrences led to several bloody reprisal attacks in southern Greece by the Greek rebels, who regarded the Jews as collaborators of the Turks. This in turn led to the Jews joining the Turks in confronting Christians in some locations in northern Greece, which fueled a new wave of anti-Jewish attacks in the south. During the night, Gregory V's corpse was recovered by Greek sailors, who brought it to Odessa. After the funeral, some Greek sailors attacked Jewish shops which had remained open during the ceremony.

In Odessa, then part of the Russian Empire, local Greeks committed what some sources consider the first 19th-century Russian pogrom, killing 14 Jews. This was fueled by the rumor that Jews had taken part in Gregory V's lynching.

Gregory V's body was eventually interred in the Metropolitan Cathedral of Athens. He is commemorated by the Greek Orthodox Church as an ethnomartyr (Greek: εθνομάρτυρας). In his memory, the Saint Peter Gate, once the main gate of the Patriarchate compound, was welded shut in 1821 and has remained shut ever since.

The execution of Gregory V, especially on the day of Pascha, was said to have shocked and infuriated the Greeks, and Orthodox Russia. It also caused protests in the rest of Europe and reinforced the movement of Philhellenism. There are references that during the Greek War of Independence, many revolutionaries engraved on their swords the name of Gregory V, seeking revenge.

Dionysios Solomos, in his "Hymn to Liberty", which later became the Greek national anthem, also mentions the hanging of the patriarch in some stanzas.

== Gallery ==
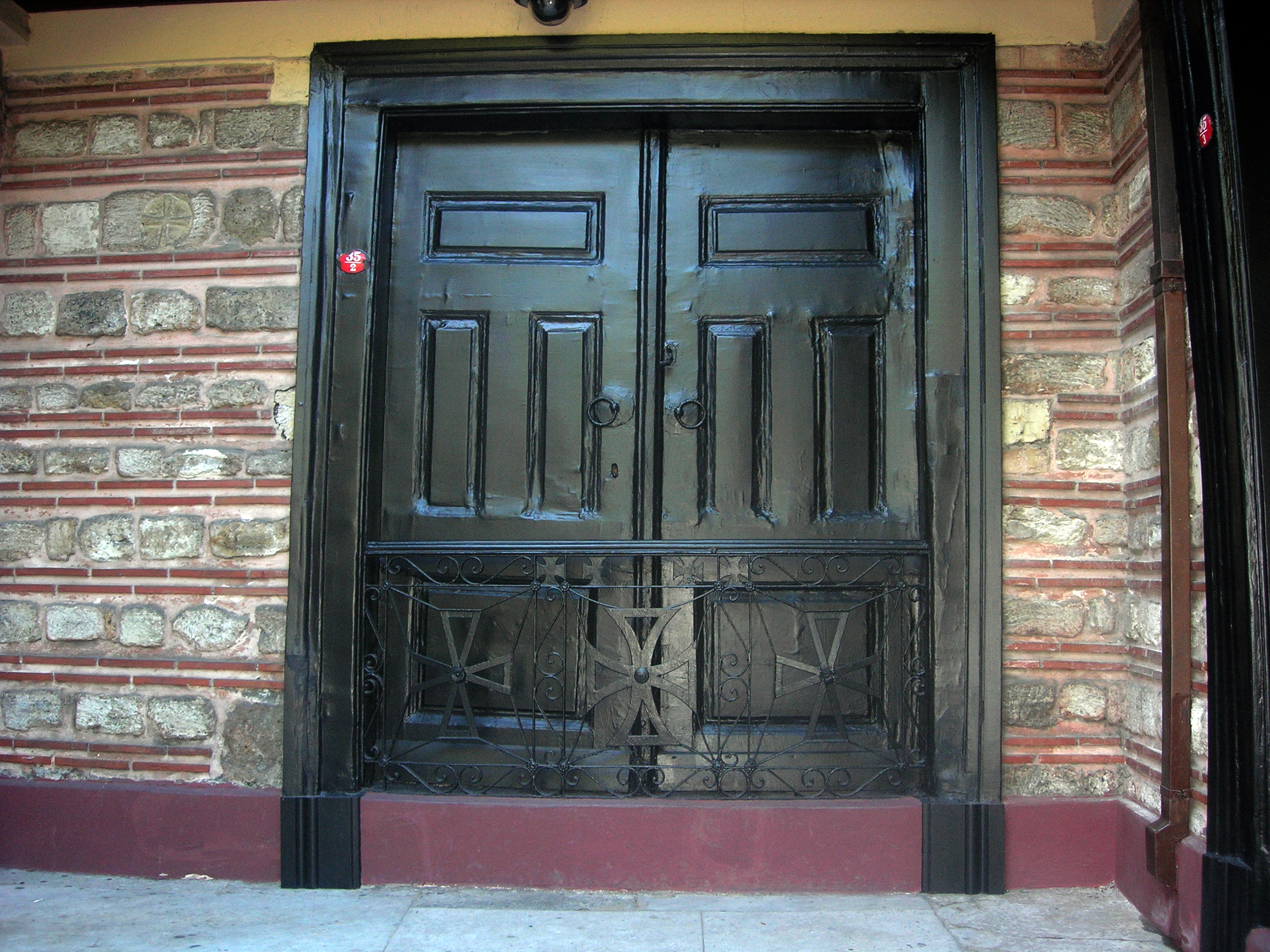
Saint Peter's Gate at the Patriarchate. Gregory V was lynched here. Since then the Gate has never been opened again.

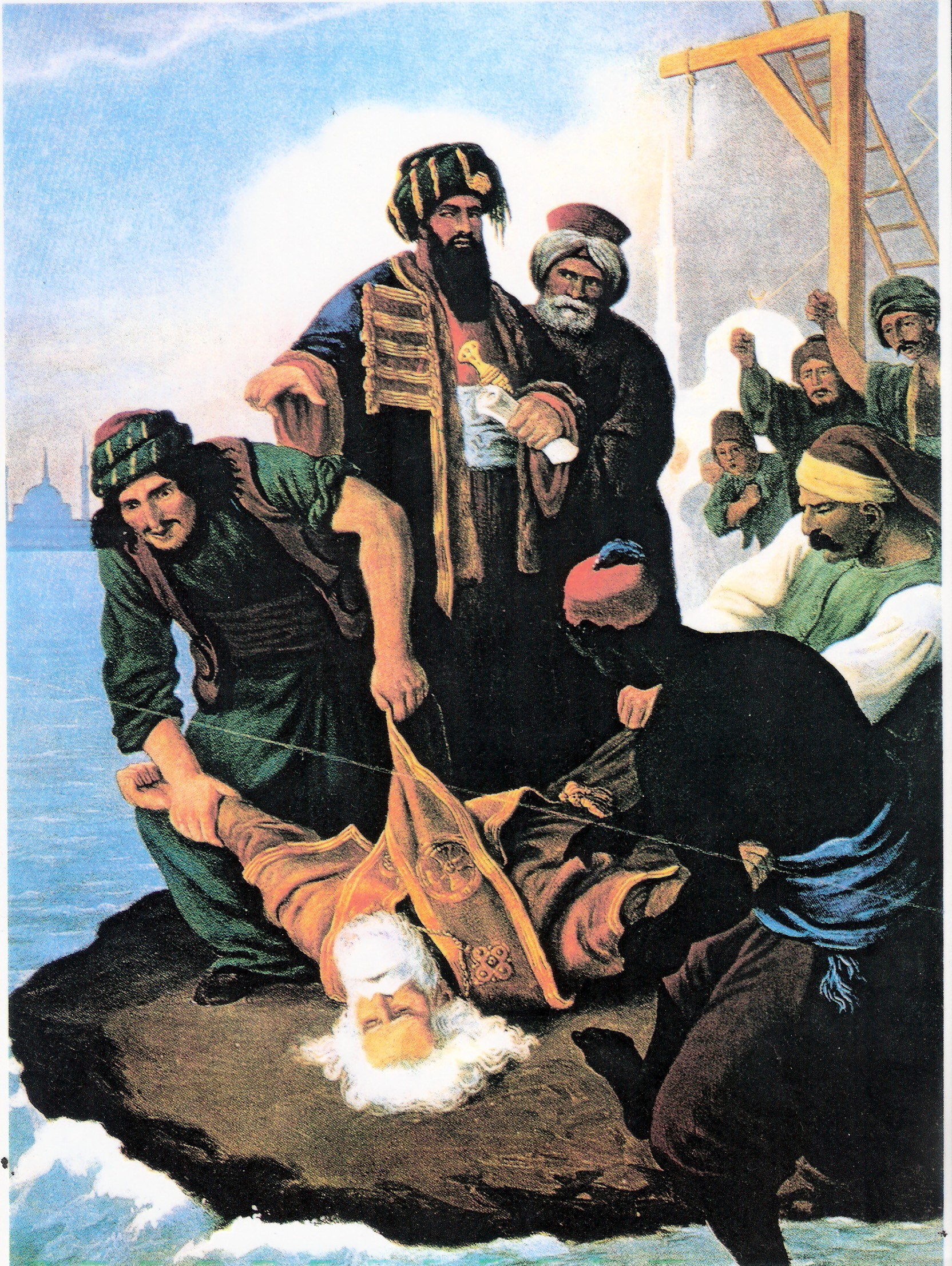
Painting by Peter von Hess depicting the casting of the corpse of Patriarch Gregory V of Constantinople into the Bosphorus.

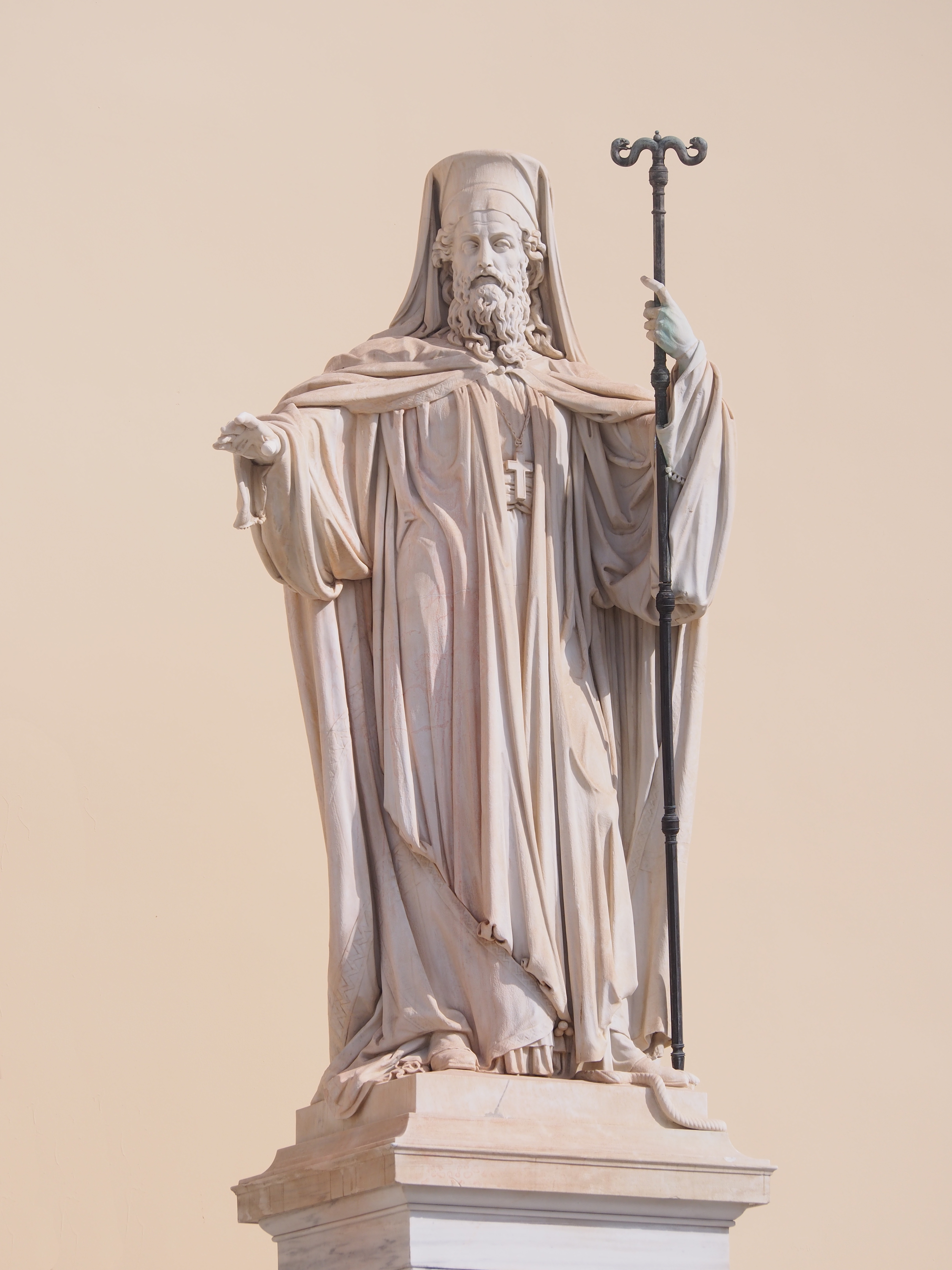
Statue of Grigorios (University of Athens) by Georgios Fytalis

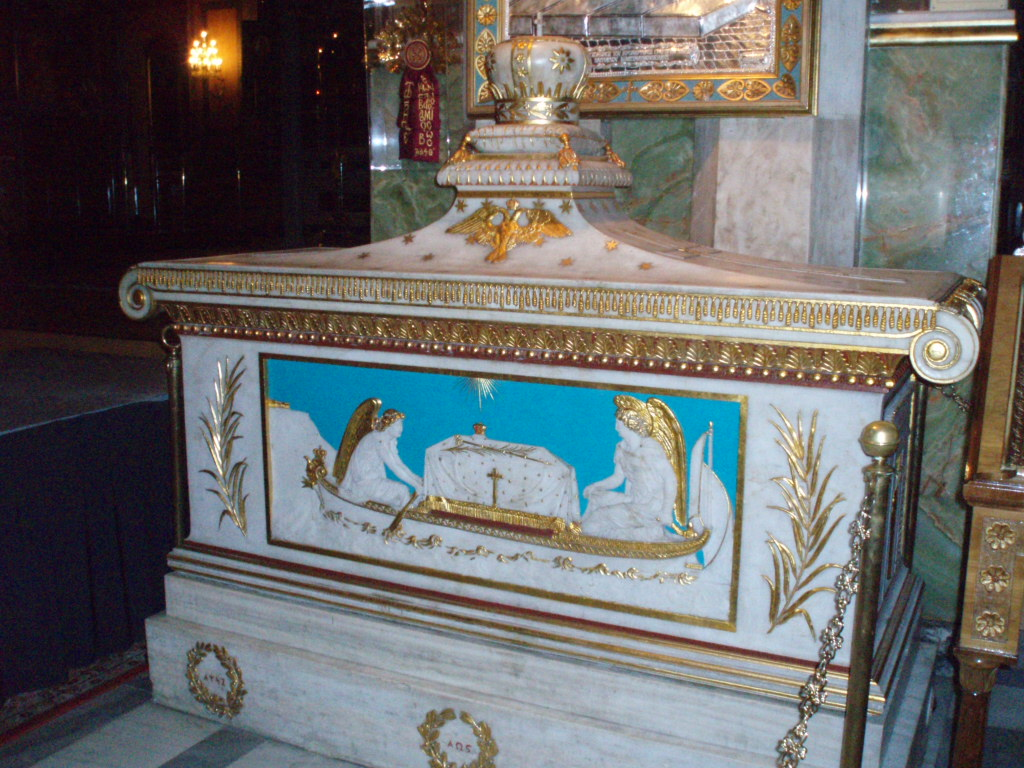
The shrine of Patriarch Grigorios (Metropolitan Cathedral of Athens)

== Notes and references ==
Eastern Orthodox Church titles
Preceded by Gerasimus III	Ecumenical Patriarch of Constantinople; 1797 – 1798	Succeeded by Neophytus VII (2)
Preceded by Callinicus V	Ecumenical Patriarch of Constantinople; 1806 – 1808	Succeeded by Callinicus V (2)
Preceded by Cyril VI	Ecumenical Patriarch of Constantinople; 1818 – 1821	Succeeded by Eugenius II
