= Nikephoros of Chios =

Saint Saint Nikephoros of Chios
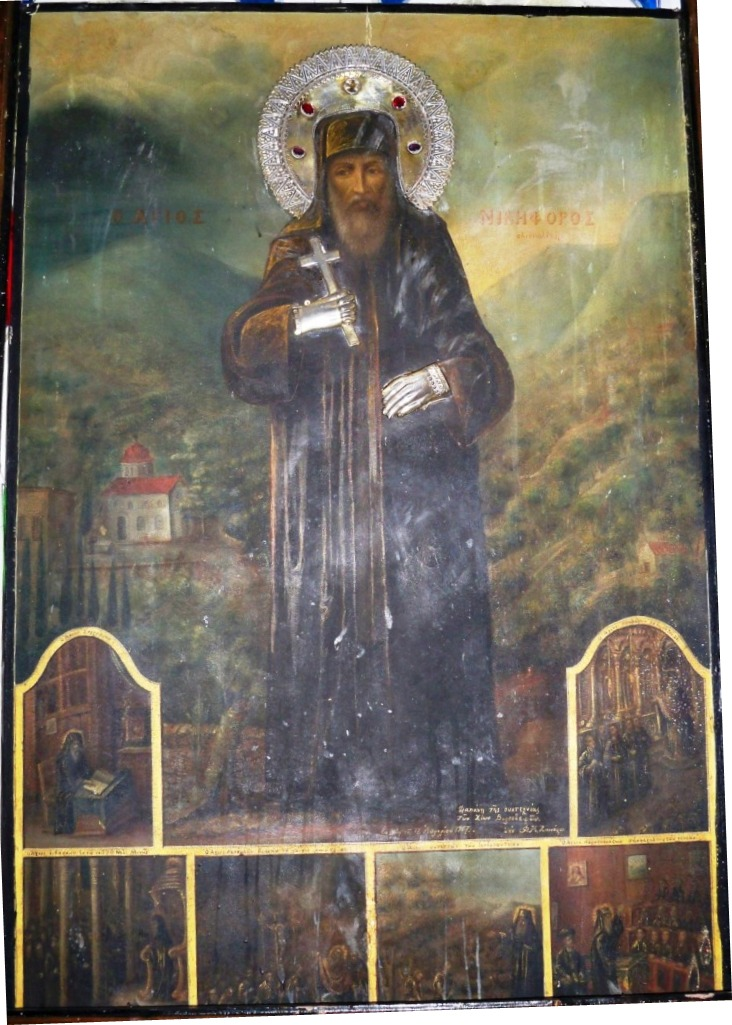
- Saint Nikephoros of Chios Icon with Scenes
- Born: c. 1750 AD; Kardamyla, Chios
- Died: c. 1821 AD; Chios
- Venerated in: Eastern Orthodox Church
- Major shrine: Church of Saint George, Chios, Greece
- Feast: 1 May

Father Nikephoros of Chios (Greek: Νικηφόρος; 1750–1821, also Nicephoros, Nicephorus, Nikephorus) was the spiritual son and disciple of Macarius of Corinth and known for his holy life and character. He was regarded as a saint already during his lifetime. His feast day is celebrated on May 1.

== Life ==
Saint Nikephoros was a hieromonk born around 1750 in the town of Kardamyla, in the northeastern part of the Aegean island of Chios. As a child he fell seriously ill with a contagious disease. His parents vowed that if he survived he would be given as a monk to the monastery of Nea Moni. He recovered from his illness and became a monk, studying at the famous Chiote school.

His mentors included Father Neophytos Kafsokalyvitis, Father Athanasius of Paros and Saint Macarius of Corinth. He was ordained and elected an abbot of Nea Moni.

Although Saint Nikephoros probably died in the summer of 1821, his Feast Day is designated as May 1. He died in a home near the church of Saint Paraskeve, where he sometimes stayed overnight when he was unable to return to Resta, a hermitage where he lived after leaving the monastery. His body was brought to Resta and placed in a grave where both Saint Athanasius Parius and the monk Nilus had once been buried. The holy relics of Saint Nikephoros were uncovered in 1845 and brought to the metropolitan church of Chios. Many years later, the Guild of Tanners asked for the relics and placed them in the Church of Saint George in Resta, where they remain. In 1907, an icon of Saint Nikephoros was painted and a church service was composed in his honor.

He taught and wrote in Chios, leading a life of spiritual endeavor there. He loved Chios as his fatherland and as a place where piety and learning flourished. For this reason, and because no occasion arose for him to leave the island, he remained within its confines throughout his lifetime.

One year after his death Chios was devastated by the Turks.

== Bibliography ==
- Church service and hymns to Saints Niketas, John, and Joseph (May 20).
- Church service and hymns to Saint Matrona of Chios (October 20).
- Church service and hymns to new-martyr Saint Nicholas the New (October 31), published in Venice in 1791.

== The New Leimonarion ==
In 1805, on his deathbed, Saint Macarius asked Saint Nikephoros to finish his book The New Leimonarion and see that it was published. It contains the lives and church services of various martyrs, ascetics, and other saints. Three saints collaborated in its compilation: Saint Macarius, Saint Nikephoros and Saint Athanasius Parios.

== Relationships ==
The greatest influence on his life was Saint Macarius of Corinth (April 17), whom he met even before he met Saint Athanasius. Macarius was at Chios in 1780, left for a time, then returned in 1790. Nikephoros saw Saint Macarius frequently, and learned much from him. He also met Saint Athanasius Parios (June 24), who was the director of the school in the city of Chios.

== Sources ==
- This article is derived in whole or in part from Nikephoros of Chios at OrthodoxWiki, which is dually licensed under CC-By-SA and GFDL. All relevant terms must be followed.
