= Kollyvades =

Movement within Eastern Orthodox Church

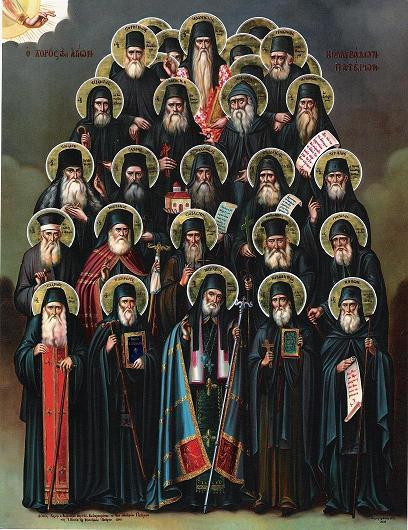

The Kollyvades (Greek: Κολλυβάδες) were the members of a movement within the Eastern Orthodox Church that began in the second half of the eighteenth century among the monastic community of Mount Athos, which was concerned with the restoration of traditional practices and opposition to unwarranted innovations, and which turned unexpectedly into a movement of spiritual regeneration. As Metropolitan Kallistos Ware points out:

Throughout the Turkish period the traditions of Hesychasm remained alive, particularly on Mount Athos. Here during the second half of the eighteenth century there arose an important movement of spiritual renewal, whose effects can still be felt today. Its members, known as the Kollyvades, were alarmed at the way in which all too many of their fellow Greeks were falling under the influence of the Western Enlightenment. The Kollyvades were convinced that a regeneration of the Greek nation would come, not through embracing the secular ideas fashionable in the west, but only through a return to the true roots of Orthodox Christianity – through a rediscovery of Patristic theology and Orthodox liturgical life. In particular, they advocated frequent communion – if possible, daily – although at this time most Orthodox communicated only three or four times a year. For this the Kollyvades were fiercely attacked on the Holy Mountain and elsewhere.

The movement derived its name from the Kollyva (boiled wheat) which is used during memorial services. Its proponents were Athonite monks who adhered strictly to Holy Tradition, and insisted that memorial services should not be performed on Sundays, because that is the day of the Lord's Resurrection, but rather on Saturday, the usual day for the commemoration of the dead. They were also in favor of frequent reception of Holy Communion, and practiced unceasing prayer of the heart.

The terms “Kollyvades”, “Kollyvistai”, and “Sabbatianoi” were epithets which were originally meant sarcastically as bitter insults, however over the passage of time these contemptuous appellations became a title or badge of honor. The leaders of the movement were Neophytos Kafsokalyvitis (1713–1784), (Note: Neophytos Kavsokalyvites († 1784) was a Peloponnesian of Jewish ancestry, who was belligerent in criticizing those whom he considered un-Orthodox in their views. He was a monk of admirable virtue and immense learning, even if his conservatism provoked strong opposition and eventually led to his departure from the Holy Mountain.) Saint Makarios (Notaras) of Corinth (1731–1805), Saint Nicodemus of the Holy Mountain (1749–1809), and Saint Athanasios Parios (1722–1813).

== History ==
=== Commemorations of the dead ===
The movement arose in 1754 out of a dispute within the Skete of St. Anne at Mount Athos when a group of monks objected to the scheduling of the commemoration of the dead on Sunday, the day that represented the Resurrection and Christ's victory over death, instead of Saturday or weekdays as it had been according to ancient custom. Other monks held that the commemoration of the dead has a Resurrection theme in every Liturgical celebration. While much animosity developed between the groups, the movement of the Kollyvades, as they became known, became part of an attempt to address deficiencies in spiritual life that had arisen in the Church since Byzantine times.

The first response from Constantinople to the issue of Sunday commemorations of the dead came in the form of a letter from Patriarch Theodosios II in 1772, wherein he stated that those who performed Saturday memorials did so appropriately in conformity with ancient tradition, whereas those who performed them on Sundays “ouch hypokeintai krimati” (do not sin).

This attempt at reconciliation having failed, the Patriarch's successor, Samuel I Chatzeres (1773–1774), issued a Synodal Encyclical (1773) directing all monastics to adhere to the policies enacted by their monasteries and avoid strife over the issue of commemorations. Once more, this tactic, also in the spirit of compromise and aimed at a reconciliation of the two factions, failed.

Therefore, a Synod was convened in 1774 at the Koutloumousiou Monastery, on Mount Athos, at the order of the Ecumenical Patriarch. It was composed of two former Patriarchs of Constantinople, four retired Metropolitans, two active Metropolitans, and two Bishops from Thessaloniki. There were also about two hundred monks present at the convocation. The Synod declared that all of those who did not accept the Synodal Encyclical of 1773 were subject to anathema. Despite this determination, the controversy went on.

Thus, in 1776, yet another Synod was convened in Constantinople, under Patriarch Sophronios II, at which the Patriarch of Jerusalem and sixteen other hierarchs were also present. It was declared by the participants that memorial services could be celebrated on either Saturday or Sunday, and that the issue was not to be discussed further. It was at this Synod that St. Athanasios Parios, Neophytos Kavsokalyvites, and St. Nikodemos the Hagiorite, among others, were excommunicated. These individuals were of course subsequently vindicated.

=== Frequent communion ===
In addition to the issue of following proper ritualistic traditions, there was a concern for return to a Eucharistic-centered spirituality and to the precepts preached by the Hesychasts of the fourteenth century. The Kollyvades movement strove for a rediscovery of patristic theology and a liturgical life that included frequent communion. The movement came under assault by many at Mount Athos and elsewhere, attacks that became, at times, vicious and beyond what one would expect from monastics and clergy of any rank.

In 1819 a Council at Constantinople endorsed the views of the Kollyvades fathers that Holy Communion should be partaken of regularly by clergy and faithful alike. (Note: "In 1819, Patriarch Gregory V wrote to the monks of the Holy Mountain declaring that Communion should not be received at certain set times, but whenever one felt himself ready for it, following confession and other necessary preparation.")

=== Kollyvades Fathers ===
- St. Kosmas Aitolos († 1779), who traveled throughout Greece trying to return the peasants to their faith, and preached frequent communion.
- Neophytos Kavsokalyvites († 1784), who preached throughout the Balkans and reposed in Romania.
- St. Paisios Velitchovsky († 1794), who published the Slavonic version of the Philokalia, which greatly influenced the Optina Elders.
- St. Makarios (Notaras) of Corinth († 1805), author of “On Frequent Communion.”
- St. Nicodemus of the Holy Mountain († 1809), author of the “Evergetinos,” “Philokalia,” “The Rudder,” “Christoethia,” the “Synaxarion,” and “On Frequent Communion.”
- St. Athanasios Parios († 1813), author of several works against the Western Enlightenment movement within Greece, and in favor of frequent communion.
- St. Nicephorus of Chios († 1821), disciple and biographer of St. Athanasius of Paros.
- St. Arsenios of Paros († 1877), who preached frequent communion and was also a schoolteacher, and the spiritual father of St. Nectarios of Aegina.

=== Anti-Kollyvades activists ===
- Bessarion of Rapsane († 1801).
- Theodoretos of Ioannina († 1823), a monk of the Skete of St. Anne, where the Kollyvades movement first began.

== See also ==
- Sabbath in Eastern Christianity

== Sources ==
- (in Greek) Charilaos S. Tzogas. Η περί μνημοσύνων έρις εν Αγίω Όρει κατά τον ΙΗ΄αιώνα. Θεσσαλονίκη, 1969.

(PhD Thesis. Aristotle University of Thessaloniki - Επιστημονική Επετηρίς της Θεολογικής Σχολής, Παράρτ. Αριθμ. 3).
(http://phdtheses.ekt.gr, http://hdl.handle.net/10442/hedi/23473); (https://web.archive.org/web/20190914090730/http://hippo.lib.uoa.gr/); (http://www.lib.auth.gr)

- The Kollyvades Movement and the Advocacy of Frequent Communion. In: Hieromonk Patapios and Archbishop Chrysostomos. Manna from Athos: The Issue of Frequent Communion on the Holy Mountain in the Late Eighteenth and Early Nineteenth Centuries. Vol. II in the Byzantine and Neohellenic Studies series. Ed. Rev. Professor Andrew Louth and Professor David Ricks. Oxford: Peter Lang, 2006. 187 pp. ISBN 3-03910-722-4
- Christos Yannaras. The Kollyvades Movement and the Spiritual Regeneration of Orthodoxy. In: Orthodoxy and the West. Holy Cross Orthodox Press, 2006. pp. 115–117.
- St Athanasius Parios. Commemorated on June 24. OCA - Feasts and Saints.

As of October 25, 2011, this article is derived in whole or in part from Orthodox Wiki. The copyright holder has licensed the content in a manner that permits reuse under CC BY-SA 3.0 and GFDL. All relevant terms must be followed. The original text was at "Kollyvades Movement"
