= Callinicus V of Constantinople =

Ecumenical Patriarch of Constantinople from 801 to 1806 and 1808 to 1809

- Ecumenical Patriarch of Constantinople
- Church: Church of Constantinople
- In office: 17 June 1801 – 22 September 1806; 10 September 1808 – 23 April 1809
- Predecessor: Neophytus VII of Constantinople; Gregory V of Constantinople
- Successor: Gregory V of Constantinople; Jeremias IV of Constantinople

Personal details
- Died: 1809
- Denomination: Eastern Orthodoxy

Callinicus V of Constantinople (Greek: Καλλίνικος; date of birth unknown and dead in 1809) was Ecumenical Patriarch of Constantinople from 1801 to 1806 and 1808 to 1809. He was Metropolitan bishop of Adrianople (modern Edirne) (1780–1792) and Nicaea (1792–1801).

== Bibliography ==
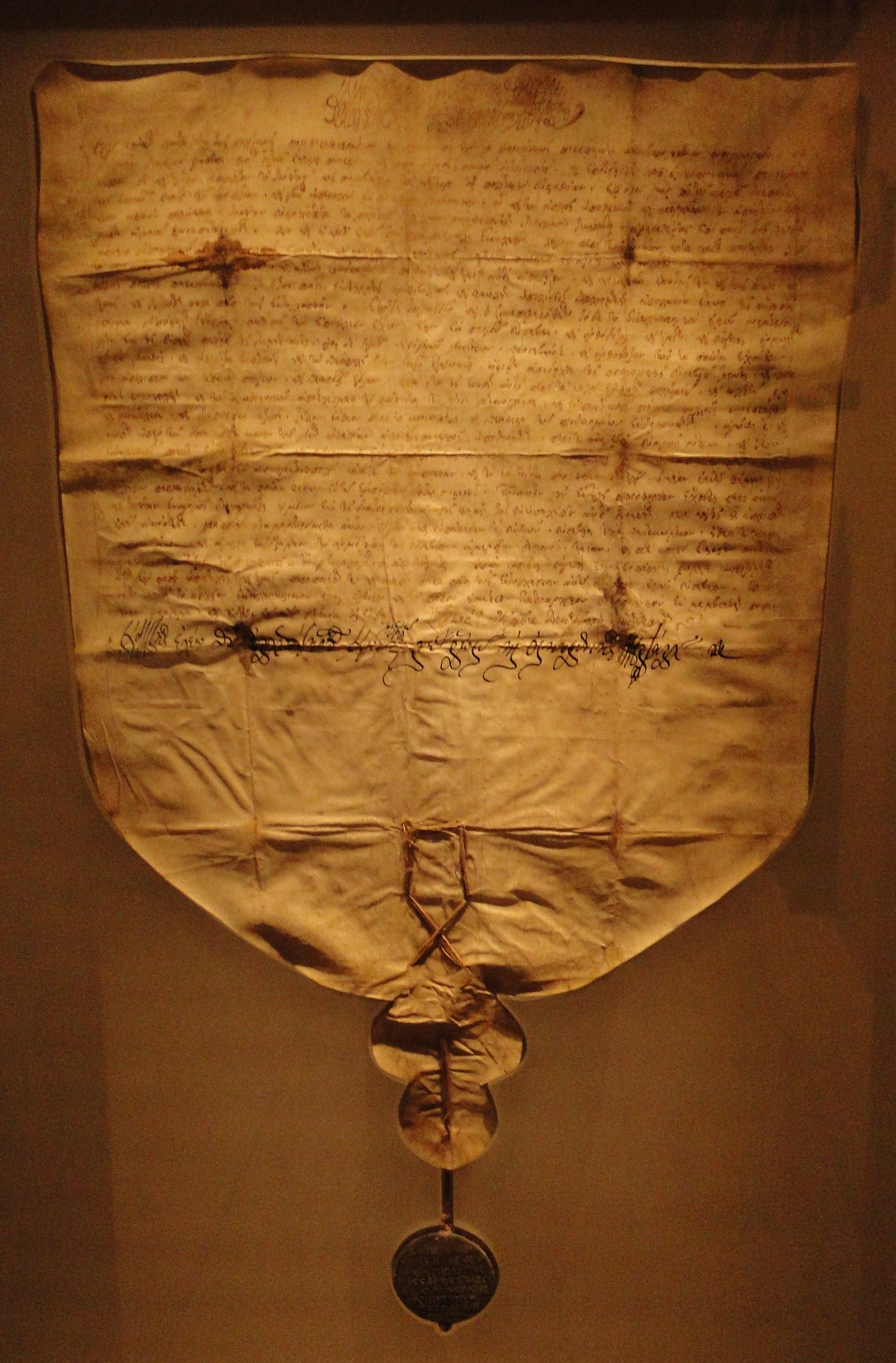
Document and seal of Kallinikos IV

- И. И. Соколов, Константинопольская церковь въ XIX вѣкѣ, Опытъ историческаго изслѣдованія, Т. I, СПб., 1904.

Eastern Orthodox Church titles
Preceded by Neophytus VII (2)	Ecumenical Patriarch of Constantinople; 1801 – 1806	Succeeded by Gregory V (2)
Preceded by Gregory V (2)	Ecumenical Patriarch of Constantinople; 1808 – 1809	Succeeded by Jeremias IV
