= Arnavutköy =

- Neighbourhood
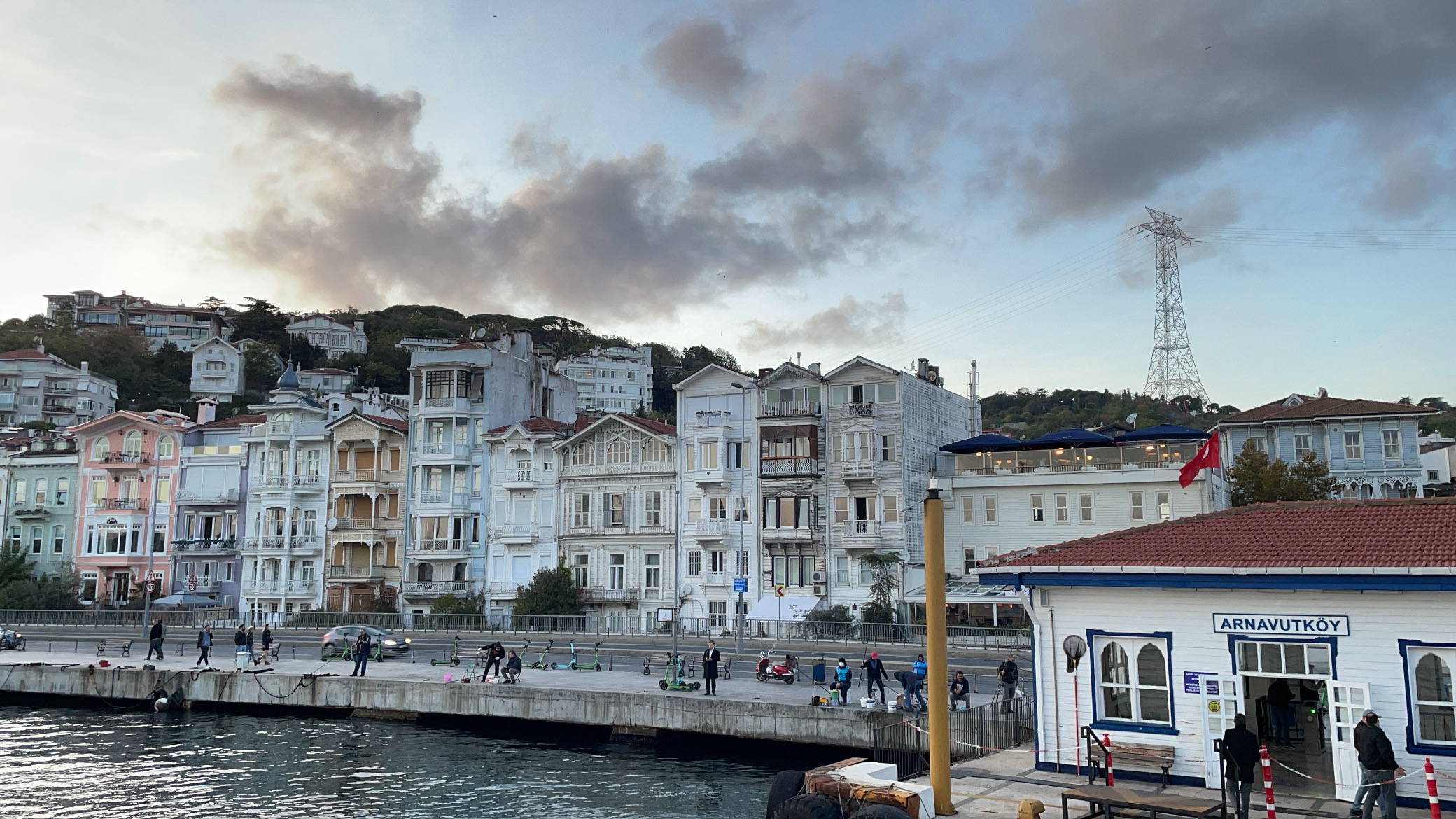

- Location within Turkey Location within Istanbul
- Coordinates: 41°4′5″N 29°2′35″E
- Country: Turkey
- Province: Istanbul
- District: Beşiktaş
- Population (2022): 3,574
- Time zone: UTC+3 (TRT)

Arnavutköy (lit. 'Albanian village) is a neighbourhood in the municipality and district of Beşiktaş, Istanbul Province, Turkey. Its population is 3,574 (2022). It is renowned for its wooden Ottoman mansions and seafood restaurants, as well as for the campus of the prestigious Robert College with its historic buildings. It is part of the Beşiktaş district of Istanbul, and is located between Ortaköy and Bebek on the European shoreline of the Bosphorus strait.

The coast road is usually lined with anglers and small fishing boats frequently pass Arnavutköy; the fresh fish caught is sometimes sold to the local seafood restaurants. At the eastern end of Arnavutköy the coast juts out to form Akıntıburnu (the Cape of the Current) where the waters of the Bosphorus once flowed so powerfully that small boats had to be towed round it, hence its Greek name for the area ("Great Current").

Infrequent Şehir Hatları (City Lines) ferries call in at the ferry terminal facing Arnavutköy's main square. Otherwise, the busy coast road is served by regular buses.

== History ==
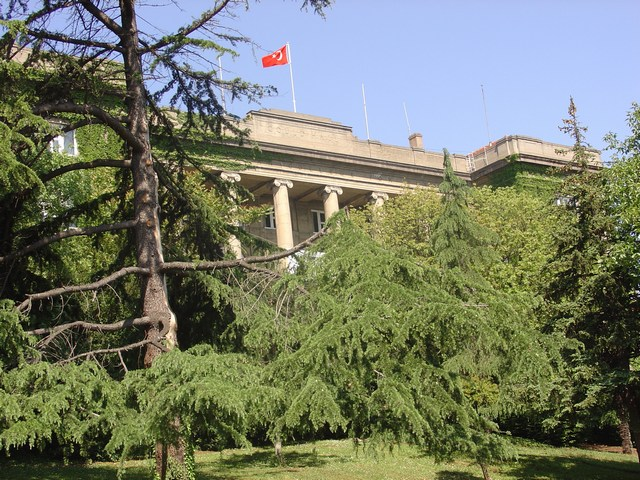
Robert College, Gould Hall

In antiquity, the area was known as Asomato and Anáplus. In 1468, Sultan Mehmed the Conqueror brought Albanians to the city for pavement construction. He installed them in Arnavutköy, hence the name of the suburb.

In 1863, Robert College, the oldest American school outside the United States, was established on its current campus which originally stretched from Arnavutköy to the vicinity of Bebek and Rumelihisarı. In 1971, a section of this campus became part of Boğaziçi University, which was formerly the college section of the school. The high school section, formerly named Robert Academy (RA) is still an American school and is located on the Arnavutköy side of the Robert College campus.

According to the Salname for 1912, the district's total population was 7,482, consisting ethnographically of 5,973 Rûms (Christians), 493 Muslims, 342 Armenians, 32 Jews and 642 people of other nationality.

During the WWI, the area suffered because of the British bombing of İstanbul.

Arnavutköy used to be famous for its Ottoman strawberries, a less juicy and smaller version of the strawberries found throughout the rest of Turkey. A few strawberry fields still survive inland from the coast and every spring local greengrocers are mobbed by strawberry lovers.

== Architecture ==
The waterfront at Arnavutköy is lined with some of the most picturesque late 19th and early 20th-century wooden houses to survive along the Bosphorus, many of them decorated in Art Nouveau style. While they look very individual, it is thought that most of the decorative elements on the facades were actually mass-produced.

== Education ==
The American Academy for Girls moved to Arnavutköy in 1914, but in 1923 moved to the Bağlarbaşı neighbourhood of Üsküdar on the Asian side of the city where it continues to accept students as the Üsküdar American Academy.

== See also ==
- Emirgan Park
- Rumelihisarı
- Arnavut

== Gallery ==
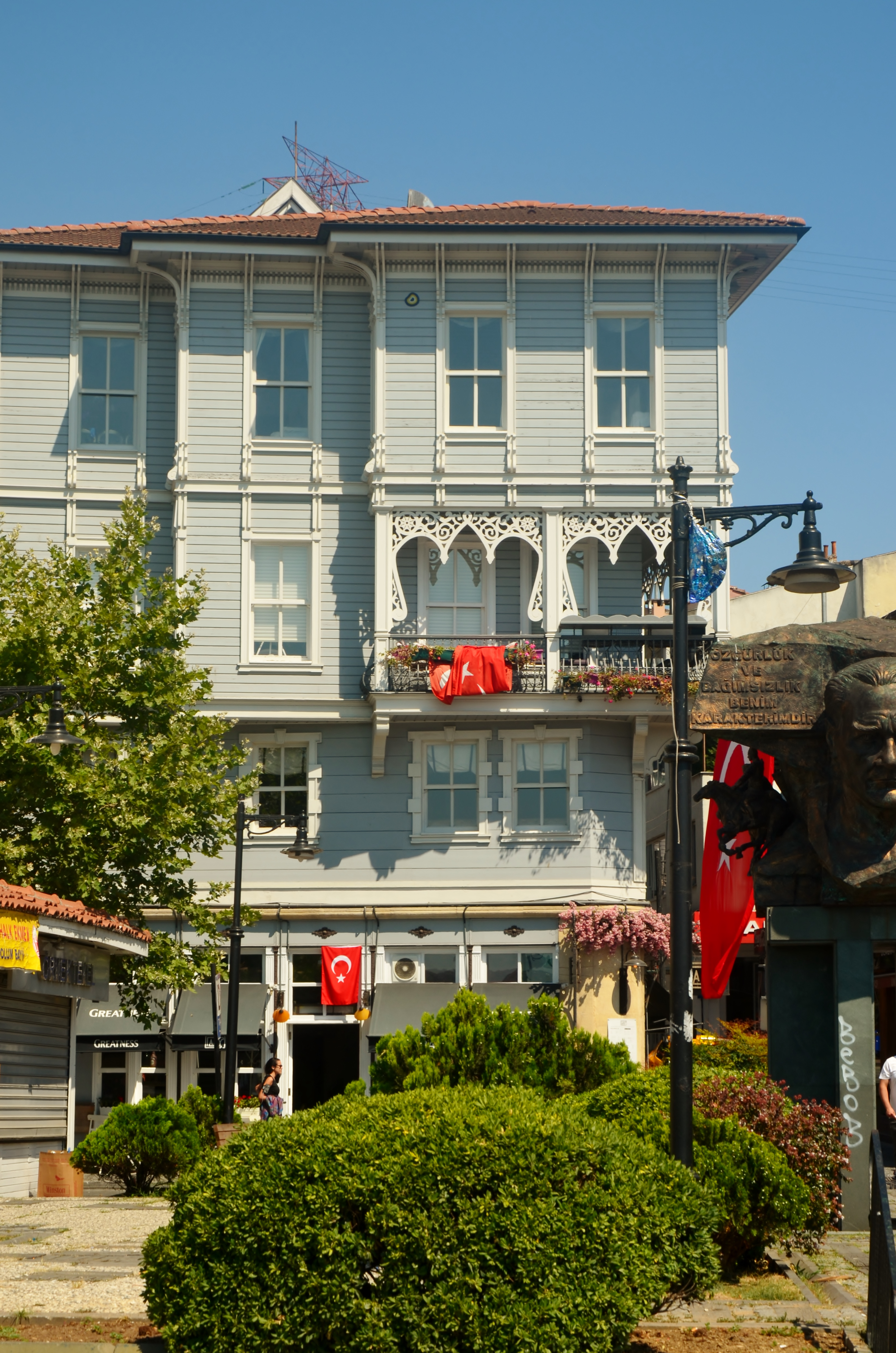

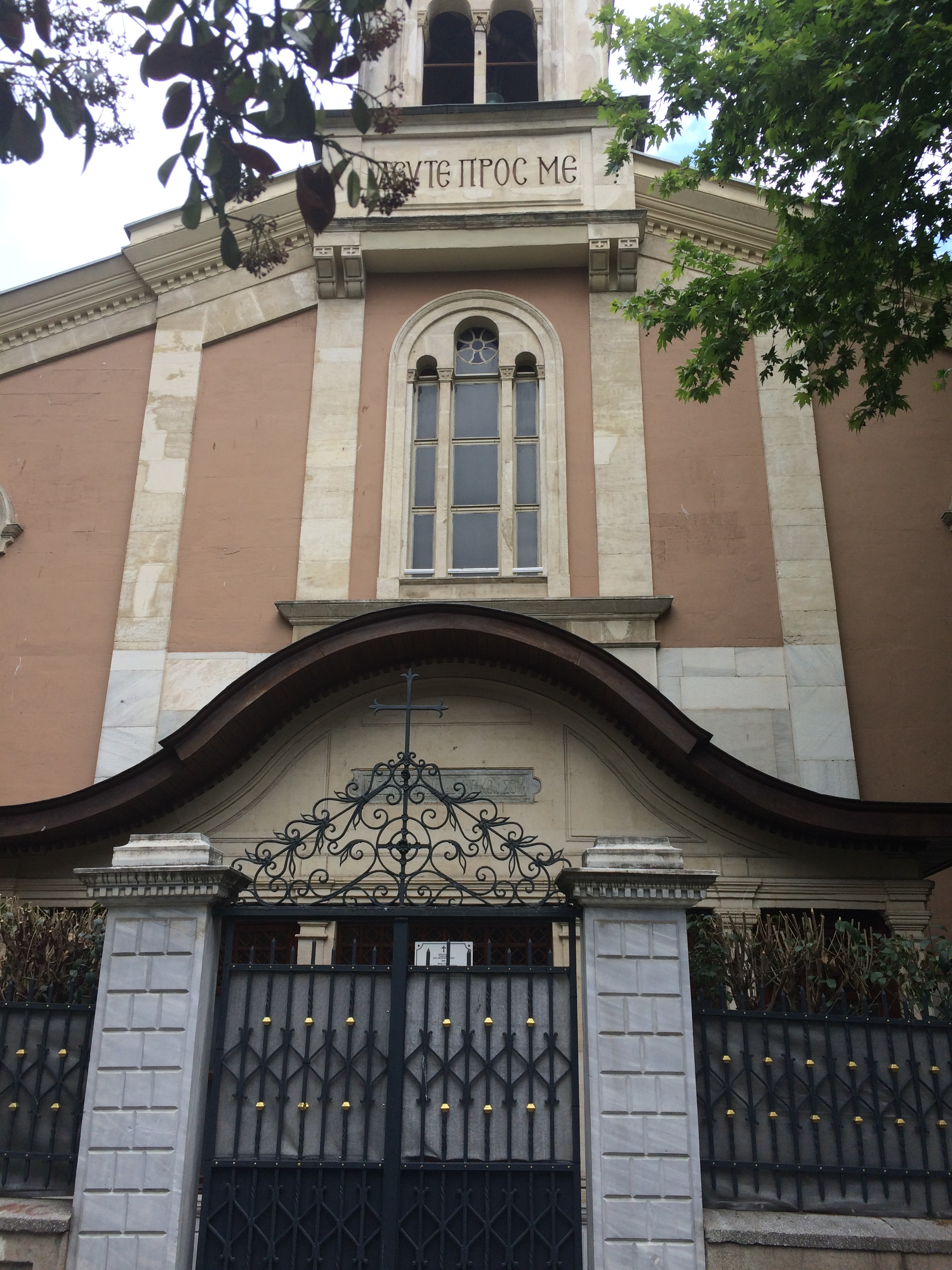

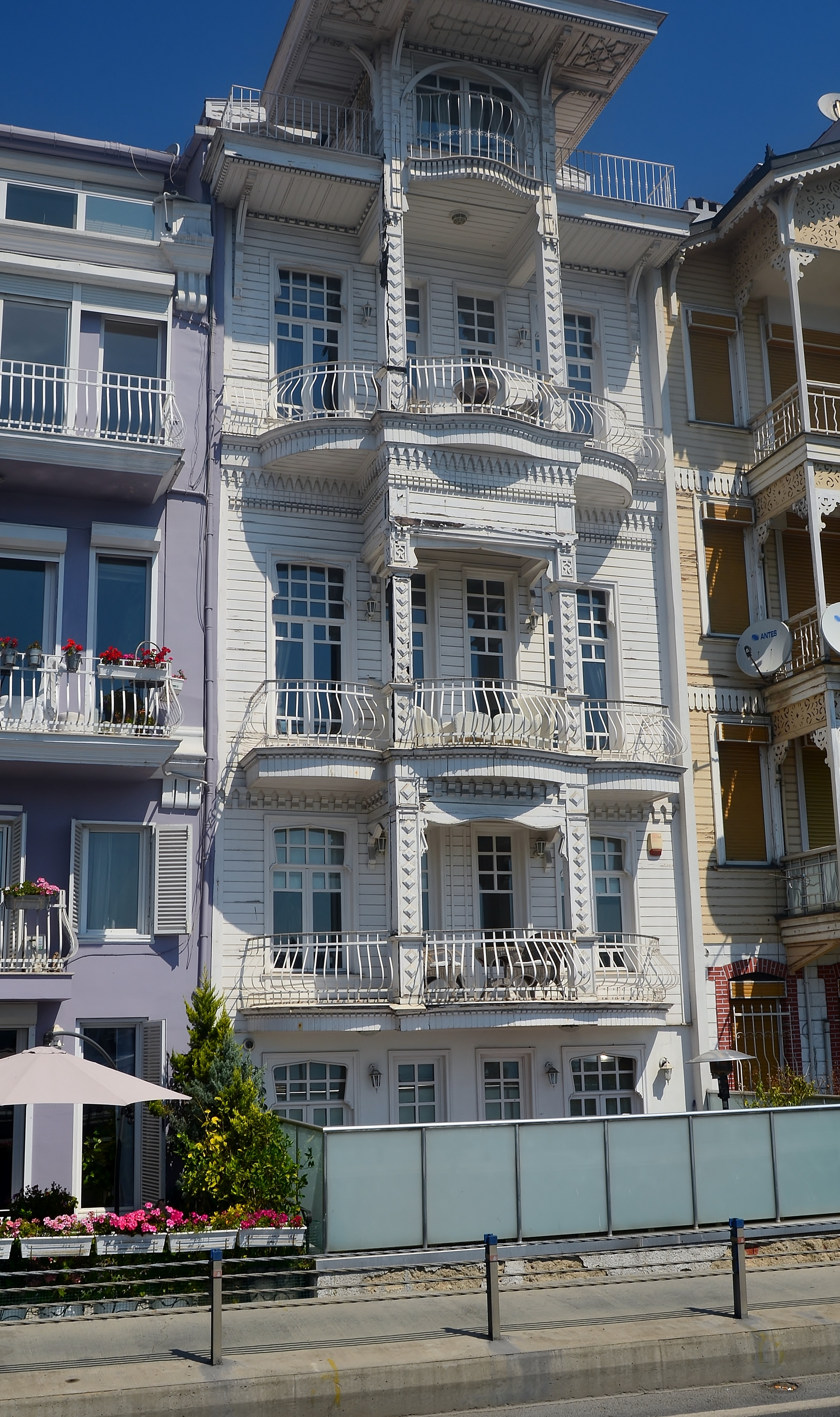

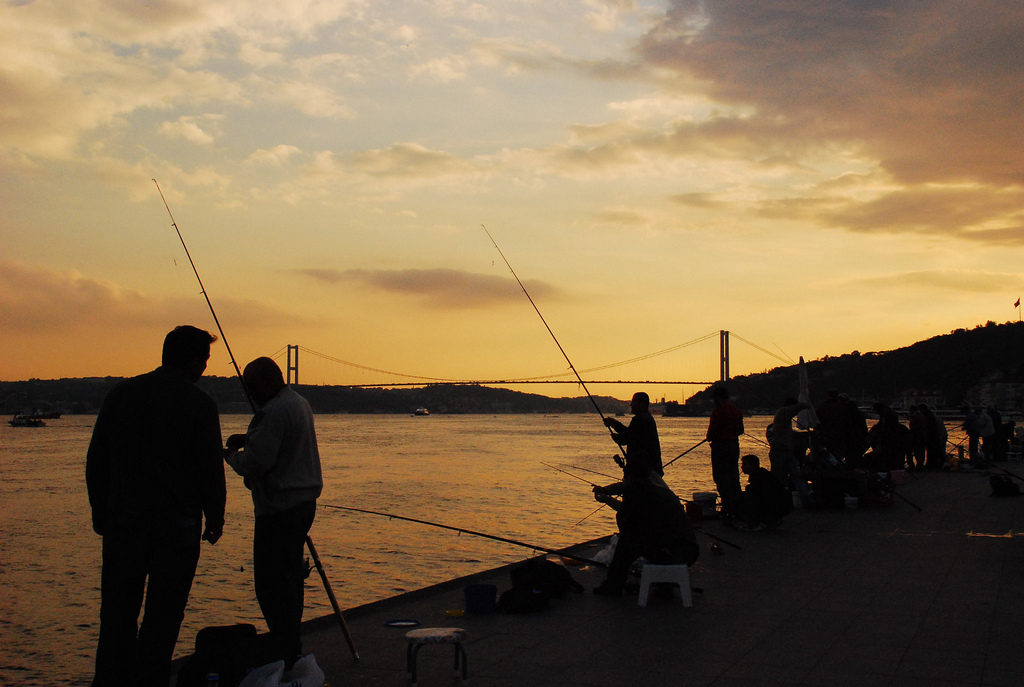

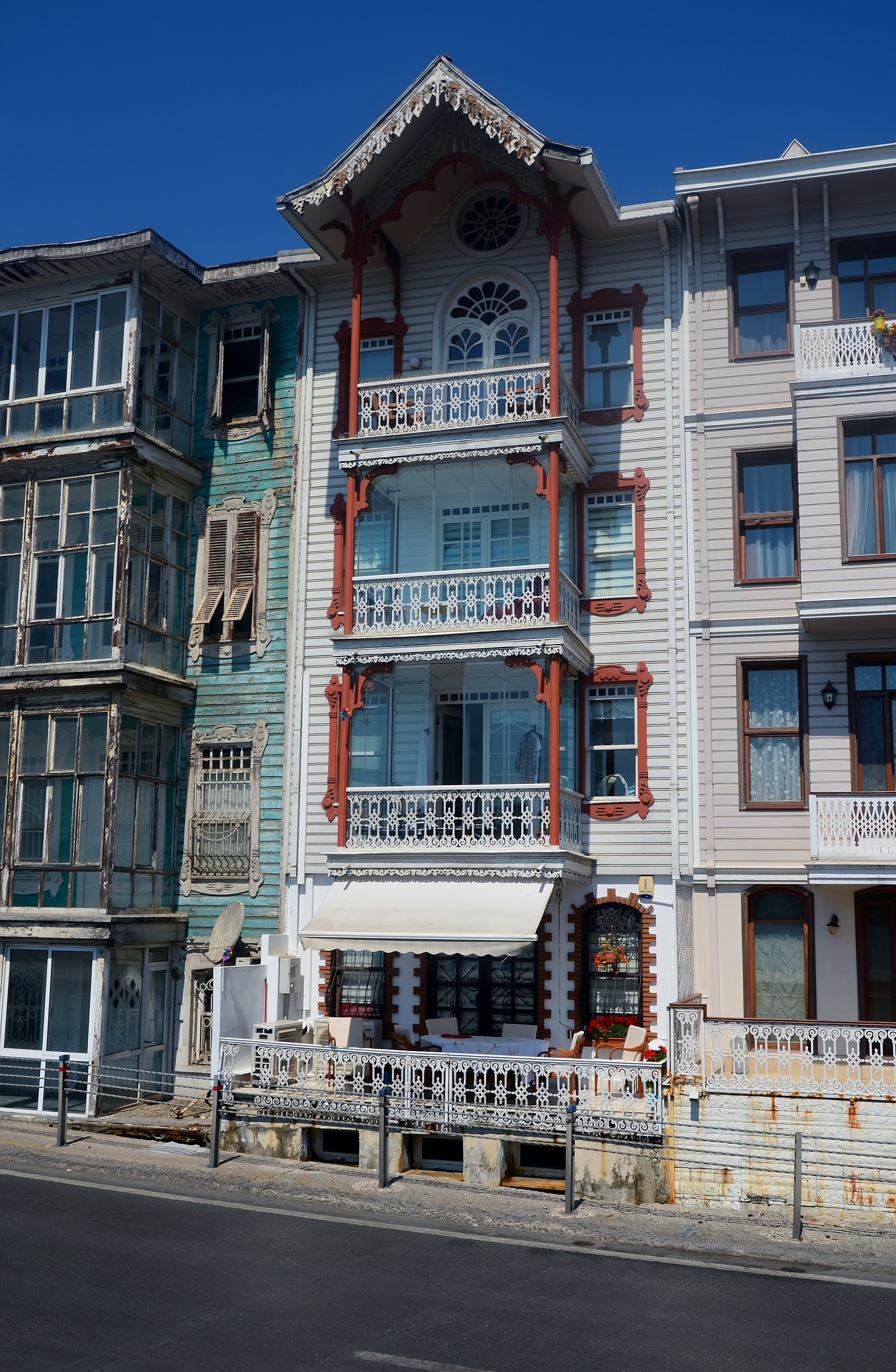

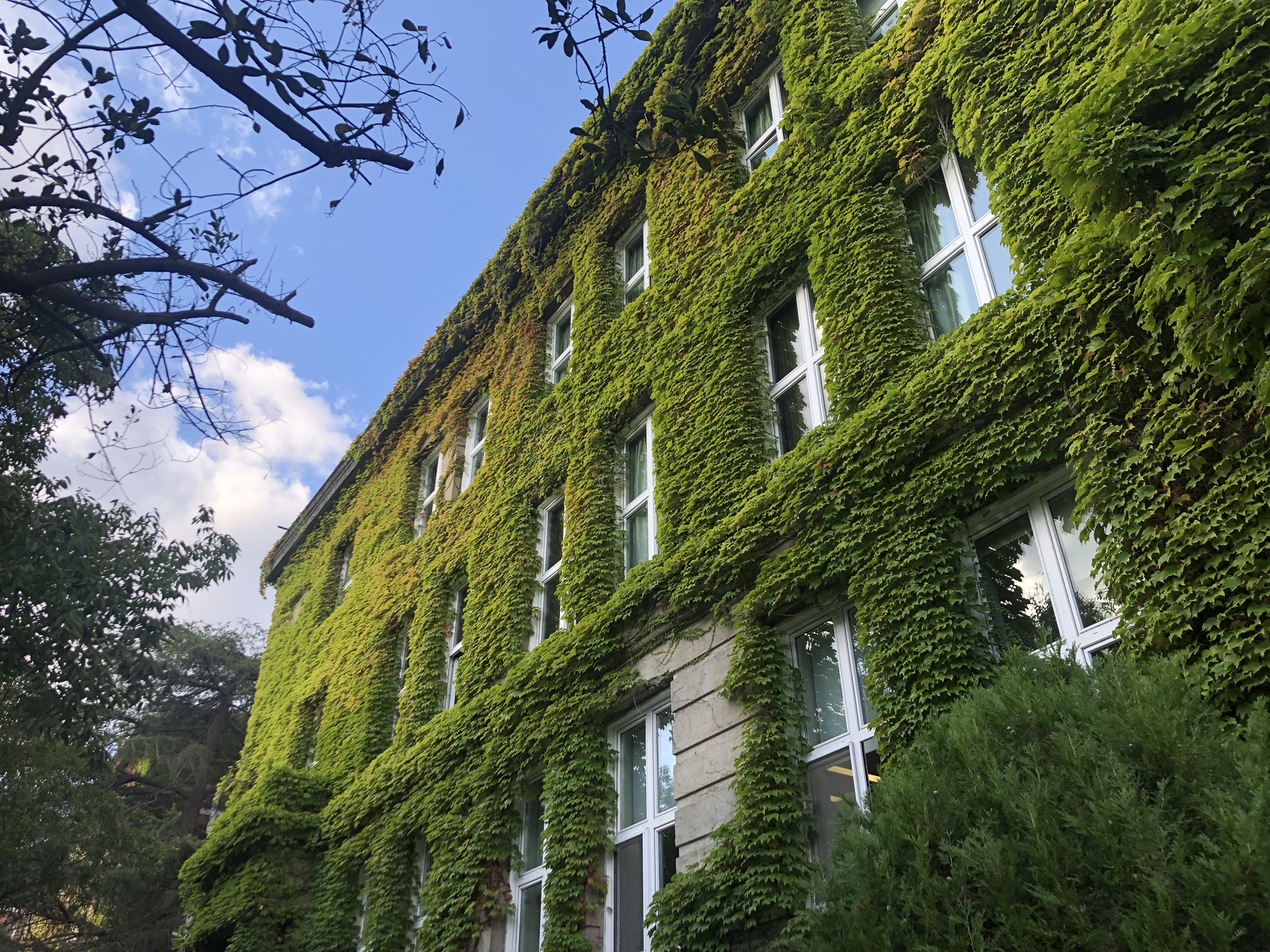

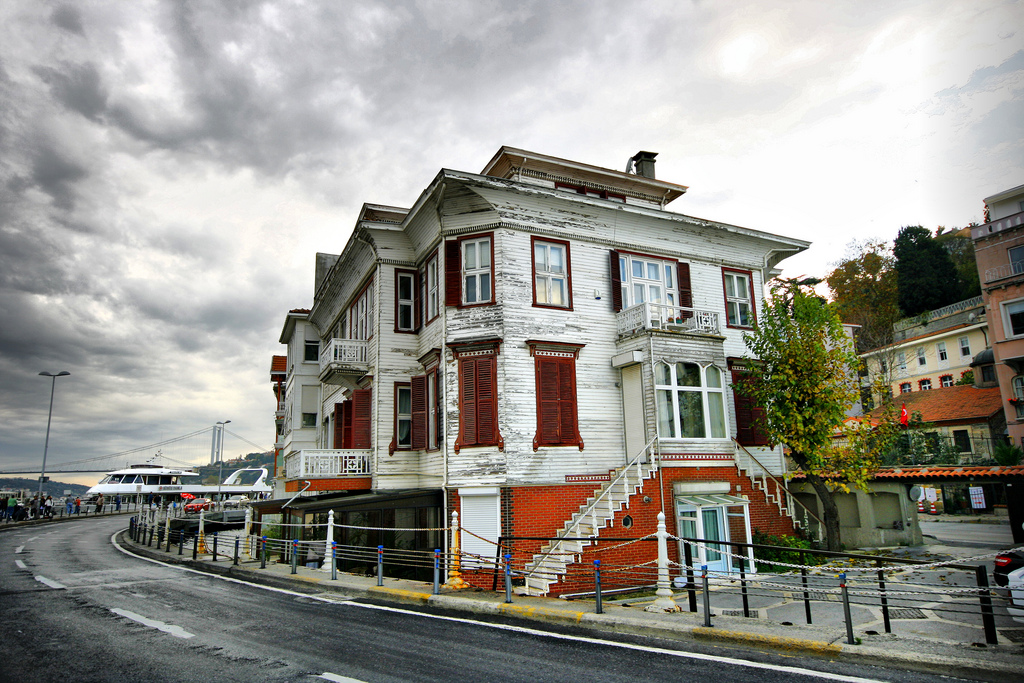

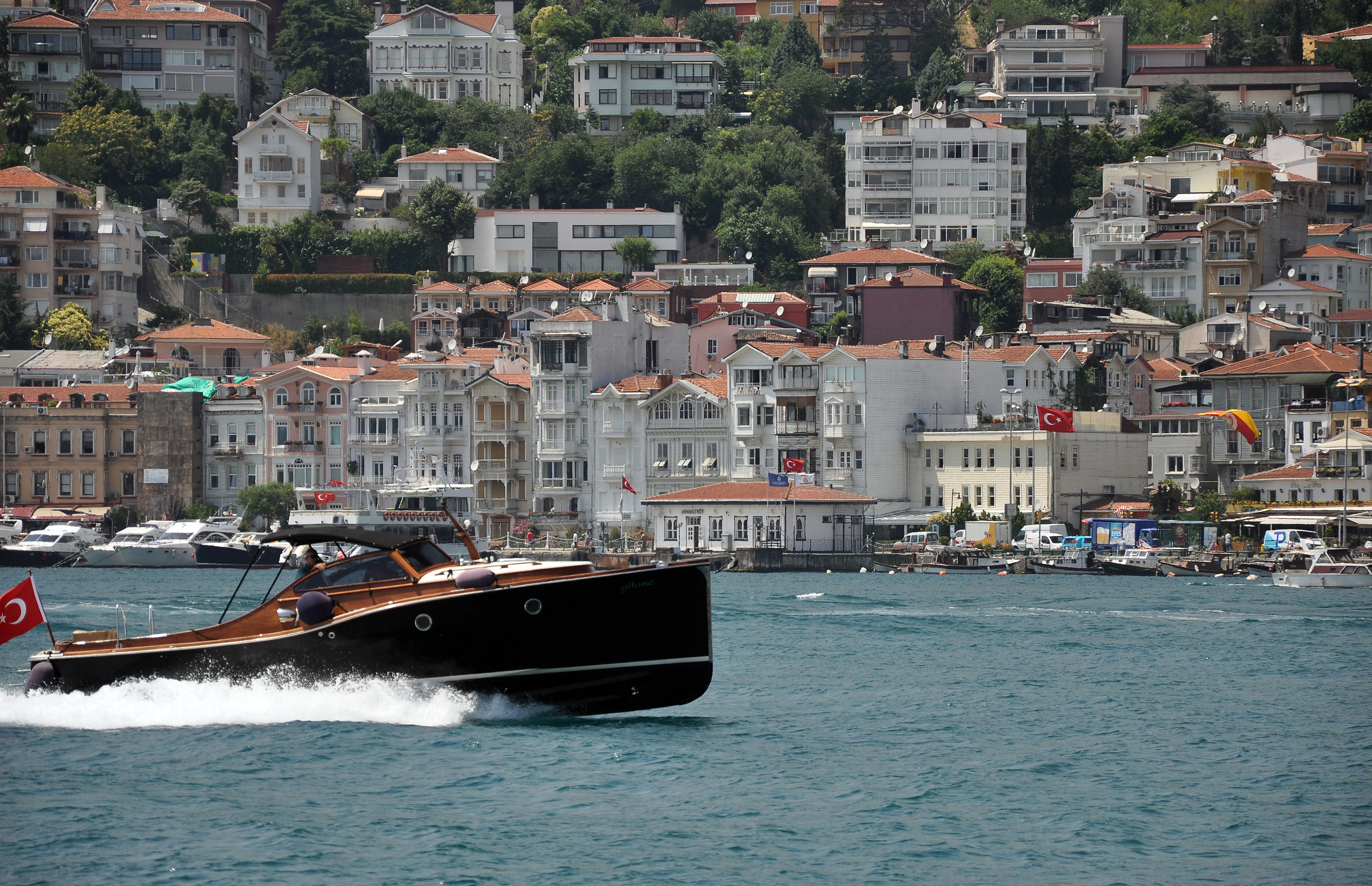
