= Patriarch Theodosius II of Alexandria =

12th-century Greek Patriarch of Alexandria

Theodosius II served as Greek Patriarch of Alexandria in the 12th century (exact dates are unknown).

Preceded by Cyril II	Greek Patriarch of Alexandria; 12th century	Succeeded by Sophronius III
