= Meletius II of Constantinople =

Ecumenical Patriarch of Constantinople from 1768 to 1769

- Ecumenical Patriarch of Constantinople
- Church: Church of Constantinople
- Diocese: Constantinople
- See: Ecumenical Patriarchate
- Installed: 5 November 1768
- Term ended: 11 April 1769
- Predecessor: Samuel of Constantinople
- Successor: Theodosius II of Constantinople

Personal details
- Born: Tenedos, Ottoman Empire
- Died: 5 January 1780 Constantinople
- Buried: Tenedos
- Denomination: Eastern Orthodox Church

Meletius II of Constantinople (Greek: Μελέτιος; died 5 January 1780) served as Ecumenical Patriarch of Constantinople during the period 1768–1769.

He was born in Tenedos. From 1750 until 1768, he served as metropolitan bishop of Larissa and then was elected Ecumenical Patriarch. During the uprising of 1769, he was dismissed and was exiled to Mytilene. In 1775, with permission of the Sultan Abdul Hamid I, he returned to Tenedos and in 1777 to Constantinople, where he died destitute in 1780.

He was probably buried on Tenedos. In the late 20th century, his fragmentary tombstone was discovered in the garden of North Bank, a mansion in Muswell Hill, London, where it may have been taken as a souvenir in the 19th century. In 2013, the stone was returned to Constantinople, in the custody of the Ecumenical Patriarchate.

== Bibliography ==
- Οικουμενικό Πατριαρχείο.
- Encyclopaedia Papyrus Larousse Britannica, 2007, vol. 35, p. 419.

Eastern Orthodox Church titles
Preceded by Samuel	Ecumenical Patriarch of Constantinople; 1768 – 1769	Succeeded by Theodosius II
