= Peter and Paul (film) =

1981 film by Robert Day

- DVD cover
- Written by: Christopher Knopf and Stan Hough
- Directed by: Robert Day
- Starring: Anthony Hopkins; Robert Foxworth; Eddie Albert; Raymond Burr; Jose Ferrer; Jon Finch; David Gwillim; Herbert Lom; Jean Peters
- Music by: Allyn Ferguson
- Country of origin: United States
- Original language: English
- No. of episodes: 2

Production
- Producer: Stan Hough
- Cinematography: Richard C. Glouner A.S.C.
- Editor: Houseley Stevenson
- Running time: 194 minutes
- Production company: Universal Television

Original release
- Network: CBS
- Release: April 12 – April 14, 1981

Peter and Paul is a television miniseries that originally aired on CBS in two 2-hour parts on April 12, 1981, and April 14, 1981. This biblical drama featured Anthony Hopkins as Paul of Tarsus and Robert Foxworth as Peter the Fisherman, David Gwillim as Mark and Jon Finch as Luke. It was directed by Robert Day. The historically based miniseries covers much of the Book of Acts in its Biblical re-telling of chapters 8 through 28, including the apostolic missionary journeys and interactions of Peter and Paul.

== Synopsis ==
Living in Jerusalem just after Christ's death and resurrection, Paul does his best to destroy the early Christian church. He participates in the execution of the first Christian martyr, Stephen (Acts 7:55–8:4) just before Paul's supernatural encounter with Jesus on the road to Damascus (Acts 9). From there, in episodic detail the miniseries highlights the Christian Jews' early reluctance to welcome Paul (Acts 11), and King Herod Agrippa having James and the Son of Zebedee executed by sword.

Next is Peter's own arrest, his miraculous release from prison, and appearance at the house of Mary the mother of John, also called Mark (Acts 12). This is followed by Paul's eventual partnership with Barnabas in ministry to the Gentiles beginning with their 1st Missionary Journey (Acts 13–14). Then comes the Jerusalem Council meeting, called to debate whether or not male Gentiles who were converting as followers of Jesus were required to become circumcised (Acts 15).

Following this, the series follows their 2nd Missionary Journey (Acts 15:36-18:22) including receiving the eager converts in Galatia and Greece, as well as their arrest and equally miraculous release from a Philippian prison (Acts 16:16-40). This is followed by Paul's Sermon on Mars Hill (Acts 17:22-34), their 3rd Missionary Journey (Acts 18:23–20:38) and afterwards Paul being recognized and seized in the Jerusalem Temple (Acts 21). The series concludes with Paul's journey to Rome for his trial.

The purpose of all of Paul's missionary journeys was the same: proclaiming God's grace in forgiving sin through Christ. Trials always follow Paul. The miniseries dramatizes Paul's trials before the Sanhedrin (Acts 22 and 23), his trial before the Roman Governor Felix (Acts 24), and then Paul's trials before his successor, the Roman Governor Festus and the Jewish King Agrippa (Acts 25 and 26).

Paul's ocean voyage to Rome (Acts 27) includes the storm and shipwreck, and his coming ashore in Malta and arrival in Rome. He preaches in Rome under government house arrest for two years before being executed by Nero, after which Peter arrives in Rome and is crucified.

== Production ==
The miniseries was shot in Rhodes, Greece. It won one Emmy (for makeup) and was nominated for a second (for costumes).

== Cast ==
- Anthony Hopkins as Saul/Paul of Tarsus
- Robert Foxworth as Apostle Peter
- Denis Lill as James the Just
- Herbert Lom as Barnabas
- Jon Finch as Luke the Evangelist
- John Rhys-Davies as Silas
- David Gwillim as Mark the Evangelist
- Clive Arrindell as Timothy
- Jose Ferrer as Gamaliel
- Emrys James as Ananias of Damascus
- Jean Peters as Priscilla
- Giannis Voglis as John the Apostle
- Nicholas Savalis as James, son of Zebedee
- Julian Fellowes as Caesar Nero
- Eddie Albert as Porcius Festus
- Raymond Burr as Herod Agrippa I
- Paul Herzberg as Herod Agrippa II
- Olga Karlatos as Berenice (daughter of Herod Agrippa I)
- Valentine Dyall as Seneca the Younger
- Donald Douglas as Sextus Afranius Burrus
- Gareth Thomas as Julius
