= List of biblical figures identified in extra-biblical sources =

These are biblical figures unambiguously identified in contemporary sources according to scholarly consensus. Biblical figures that are identified in artifacts of questionable authenticity, for example the Jehoash Inscription and the bullae of Baruch ben Neriah, or who are mentioned in ancient but non-contemporary documents, such as David and Balaam, (Note: Identified in the Tel Dan Stele and the Deir Alla Inscription respectively.) are excluded from this list.

== Hebrew Bible ==
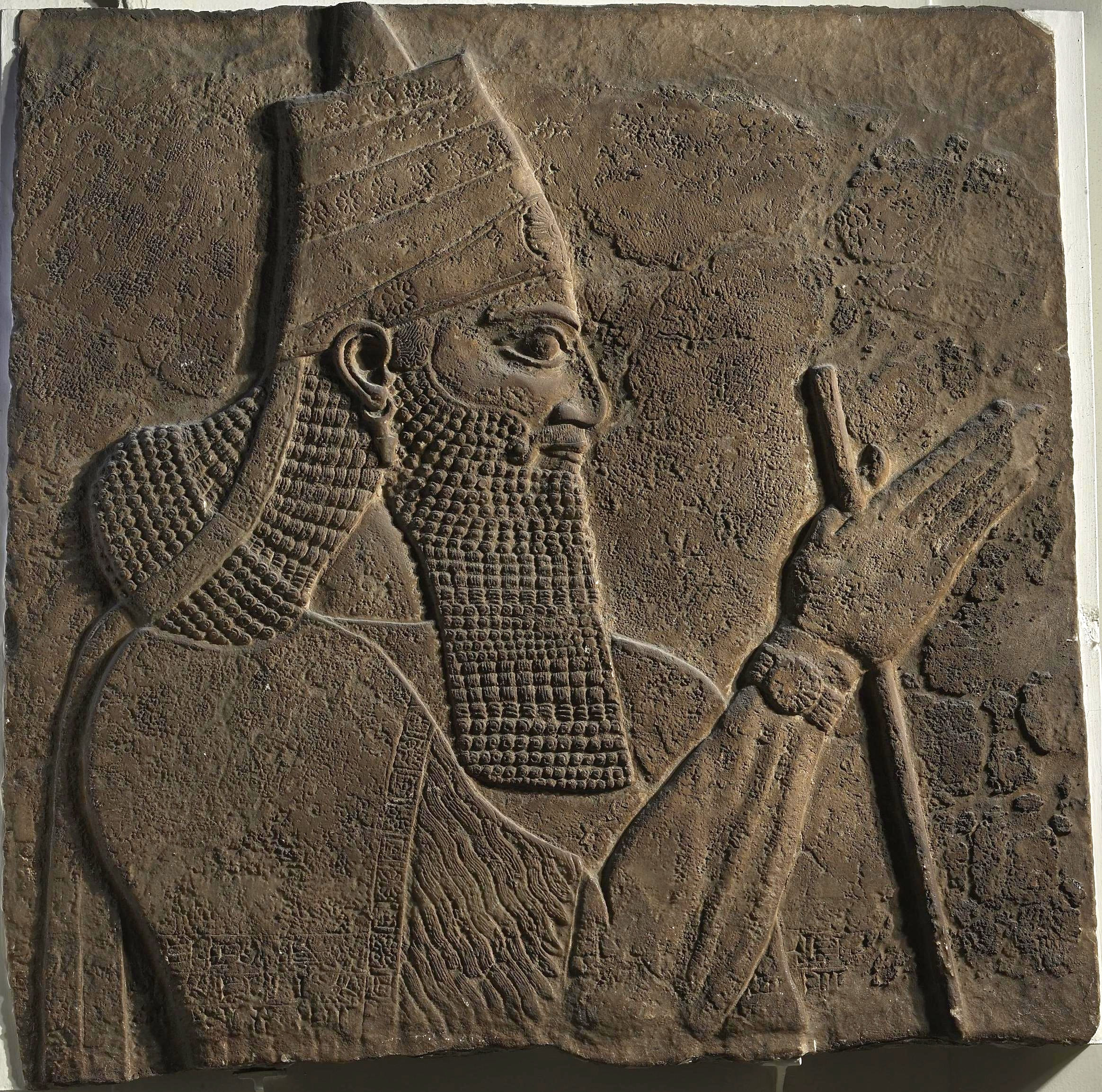
Tiglath-Pileser III: stela from the walls of his palace (British Museum, London)

Although the first mention of the name 'Israel' in archaeology dates to the 13th century BCE, contemporary information on the Israelites prior to the 9th century BCE is extremely sparse. In the following centuries, a small number of local Hebrew documents, mostly seals and bullae, mention biblical characters. Still, more extensive information is available in the royal inscriptions from neighbouring kingdoms, particularly Babylon, Assyria and Egypt.

Name	Title	Date (BCE) (Note: For kings and rulers these dates refer to their reigns. Dates for Israelite and Judahite kings are according to the chronology of Edwin R. Thiele.)	Attestation and notes	Biblical references (Note: The dagger symbol (†) indicates that all occurrences in the Bible (including the Deuterocanonical books) have been cited.)
Adrammelech	Prince of Assyria	fl. 681	Identified as the murderer of his father Sennacherib in the Bible and in an Assyrian letter to Esarhaddon (ABL 1091), where he is called "Arda-Mulissi".	Is. 37:38, 2 Kgs. 19:37†
Ahab	King of Israel	c. 874 – c. 853	Identified in the contemporary Kurkh Monolith inscription of Shalmaneser III which describes the Battle of Qarqar and mentions "2,000 chariots, 10,000 soldiers of Ahab the Israelite" defeated by Shalmaneser, though the actual number of chariots is disputed.	1 Kgs. 17, 2 Chr. 18
Ahaz	King of Judah	c. 732 – c. 716	Mentioned in a contemporary Summary Inscription of Tiglath-Pileser III which records that he received tribute from "Jehoahaz of Judah". Also identified in royal bullae belonging to Ahaz himself and his son Hezekiah.	2 Kgs. 16, Hos. 1:1, Mi. 1:1, Is. 1:1
Ahaziah	King of Judah	c. 842 – c. 841	The Tel Dan Stele contains an account by an Aram-Damascaus king, Hazael, claiming to have slain "[Ahaz]iahu, son of [... kin]g of the house of David", who reigned c. 850–849 BCE.	2 Kings 8:26, (2 Kings 9:22–28
Apries	Pharaoh of Egypt	589–570	Also known as Hophra; named in numerous contemporary inscriptions including those of the capitals of the columns of his palace. Herodotus speaks of him in Histories II, 161–171.	Jer. 44:30†
Artaxerxes I	King of Persia	465–424	Widely identified with "Artaxerxes" in the book of Nehemiah. He is also found in the writings of contemporary historian Thucydides. Scholars are divided over whether the king in Ezra's time was the same, or Artaxerxes II.	Neh. 2:1, Neh. 5:14
Ashurbanipal	King of Assyria	668 – c. 627	Generally identified with "the great and noble Osnappar", mentioned in the Book of Ezra. His name survives in his own writings, which describe his military campaigns against Elam, Susa and other nations.	Ezr. 4:10†
Belshazzar	Coregent of Babylon	c. 553–539	Mentioned by his father Nabonidus in the Nabonidus Cylinder. According to another Babylonian tablet, Nabonidus "entrusted the kingship to him" when he embarked on a lengthy military campaign.	Dn. 5, Dn. 7:1, Dn. 8:1
Ben-Hadad II (Hadadezer)	King of Aram Damascus	c.865–842	Mentioned in the Kurkh Monoliths as one of the kings allegedly defeated by Shalmaneser III of Assyria.	1 Kings 20, 1 Kings 22, 2 Kings 8:7
Ben-Hadad III	King of Aram Damascus	early 8th century	Mentioned in the Zakkur Stele. A son of Hazael, he is variously called Ben-Hadad/Bar-Hadad II/III.	2 Kgs. 13:3, 2 Kgs. 13:24
Cyrus II	King of Persia	559–530	Appears in many ancient inscriptions, most notably the Cyrus Cylinder. He is also mentioned in Herodotus' Histories.	Is. 45:1, Dn. 1:21
Darius I	King of Persia	522–486	Mentioned in the books of Haggai, Zechariah and Ezra. He is the author of the Behistun Inscription. He is also mentioned in Herodotus' Histories.	Hg. 1:1, Ezr. 5:6
David (mention)	King of Israel	10th BCE century	Mentioned in the Tel Dan stele which mentions the House of David	Book of 1st Samuel, 2nd Samuel and 1st Kings
Esarhaddon	King of Assyria	681–669	His name survives in his own writings, as well as in those of his son Ashurbanipal.	Is. 37:38, Ezr. 4:2, 2 Kgs. 19:37
Amel-Marduk (Evil Merodach)	King of Babylon	c. 562–560	His name (Akkadian: Amēl-Marduk) and title were found on a vase from his palace, and on several cuneiform tablets.	2 Kgs. 25:27, Jer. 52:31†
Hazael	King of Aram Damascus	c. 842 – c. 800	Shalmaneser III of Assyria records that he defeated Hazael in battle and captured many chariots and horses from him. The majority of scholars think that Hazael was the author of the Tel Dan Stele.	1 Kgs. 19:15, 2 Kgs. 8:8, 2 Kings 12:18, Am. 1:4
Hezekiah	King of Judah	c. 715 – c. 686	An account is preserved by Sennacherib of how he besieged "Hezekiah, the Jew", who "did not submit to my yoke", in his capital city of Jerusalem. A bulla was also found bearing Hezekiah's name and title, reading "Belonging to Hezekiah [son of] Ahaz king of Judah".	2 Kgs. 16:20, Prv. 25:1, Hos. 1:1, Mi. 1:1, Is. 1:1
Hilkiah	High Priest of First Temple Jerusalem	c. 7th century BCE	Hilkiah in extra-biblical sources is attested by the clay bulla naming a Hilkiah as the father of an Azariah, and by the seal reading Hanan son of Hilkiah the priest.	2 Kgs. 22:8, 2 Kgs. 23:24
Hoshea	King of Israel	c. 732 – c. 723	He was put into power by Tilgath-Pileser III, king of Assyria, as recorded in his Annals, found in Calah.	2 Kgs. 15:30, 2 Kgs. 18:1
Jehoash	King of Israel	c. 798 – c. 782	Mentioned in records of Adad-nirari III of Assyria as "Jehoash of Samaria".	2 Kgs. 13:10, 2 Chr. 25:17
Jehoiachin	King of Judah	598–597	He was taken captive to Babylon after Nebuchadrezzar first captured Jerusalem. Texts from Nebuchadrezzar's Southern Palace record the rations given to "Jehoiachin king of the Judeans" (Akkadian: Ya'ukin sar Yaudaya).	2 Kgs. 25:14, Jer. 52:31
Jehoram of Israel	King of Israel	852–841	He is mentioned in the Tel Dan inscription alongside Ahaziah of Judah. The author of the text, Hazael, claims to have slain both Ahaziah of Judah and "[Jeho]ram".	2 Kings 8:12, 2 Kings 3:2
Jehu	King of Israel	c. 841 – c. 814	Mentioned on the Black Obelisk.	1 Kgs. 19:16, Hos. 1:4
Jeroboam II	King of Israel	793–753	An 8th century seal belonging to 'Shema, servant of Jeroboam', refers to king Jeroboam II,	2 Kings 15:1, Amos 6:13
Johanan	High Priest of Israel	c. 410 – c. 371	Mentioned in a letter from the Elephantine Papyri.	Neh. 12:22–23
Jotham	King of Judah	c. 740 – c. 732	Identified as the father of King Ahaz on a contemporary clay bulla, reading "of Ahaz [son of] Jotham king of Judah".	2 Kgs. 15:5, Hos. 1:1, Mi. 1:1, Is. 1:1
Manasseh	King of Judah	c. 687 – c. 643	Mentioned in the writings of Esarhaddon, who lists him as one of the kings who had brought him gifts and aided his conquest of Egypt.	2 Kgs. 20:21, Jer. 15:4
Menahem	King of Israel	c. 752 – c. 742	The annals of Tiglath-Pileser (ANET^{3} 283) record that Menahem paid him tribute, as stated in the Books of Kings.	2 Kgs. 15:14–23
Mesha	King of Moab	fl. c. 840	Author of the Mesha Stele.	2 Kgs. 3:4†
Merodach-Baladan	King of Babylon	722–710	Named in the Great Inscription of Sargon II in his palace at Khorsabat. Also called "Berodach-Baladan" (Akkadian: Marduk-apla-iddina).	Is. 39:1, 2 Kgs. 20:12†
Nebuchadnezzar II	King of Babylon	c. 605–562	Mentioned in numerous contemporary sources, including the inscription of the Ishtar Gate, which he built. Also called Nebuchadrezzar (Akkadian: Nabû-kudurri-uṣur).	Ez. 26:7, Dn. 1:1, 2 Kgs. 24:1
Nebuzaradan	Babylonian official	fl. c. 587	Mentioned in a prism in Istanbul (No. 7834), found in Babylon where he is listed as the "chief cook".	Jer. 52:12, 2 Kgs. 25:8
Nebo-Sarsekim	Chief Eunuch of Babylon	fl. c. 587	Listed as Nabu-sharrussu-ukin in a Babylonian tablet.	Jer. 39:3†
Necho II	Pharaoh of Egypt	c. 610 – c. 595	Mentioned in the writings of Ashurbanipal.	2 Kgs. 23:29, Jer. 46:2
Omri	King of Israel	c. 880 – c. 874	Mentioned, together with his unnamed son or successor, on the Mesha Stele. His dynasty became the Assyrian Empire's byname for the Israelite kingdom.	1 Kgs. 16:16, Mi. 6:16
Osorkon IV	Pharaoh of Egypt	c. 730 – 716	Osorkon IV is mentioned in the Book of Kings under the name "So, King of Egypt", an abbreviation of "Osorkon".	2 Kgs. 17:4
Pekah	King of Israel	c. 740 – c. 732	Mentioned in the annals of Tiglath-Pileser III.	2 Kgs. 15:25, Is. 7:1
Rezin	King of Aram Damascus	died c. 732	A tributary of Tiglath-Pileser III of Assyria and the last king of Aram Damascus. According to the Bible, he was eventually put to death by Tiglath-Pileser.	2 Kgs. 16:7–9, Is. 7:1
Sanballat	Governor of Samaria	fl. 445	A leading figure of the opposition which Nehemiah encountered during the rebuilding of the walls around the temple in Jerusalem. Sanballat is mentioned in the Elephantine Papyri.	Neh. 2:10, Neh. 13:28
Sargon II	King of Assyria	722–705	He besieged and conquered the city of Samaria and took many thousands captive, as recorded in the Bible and in an inscription in his royal palace. His name, however, does not appear in the biblical account of this siege, but only in reference to his siege of Ashdod.	Is. 20:1†
Sennacherib	King of Assyria	705–681	The author of a number of inscriptions discovered near Nineveh.	2 Kgs. 18:13, Is. 36:1
Shalmaneser V	King of Assyria	727–722	Mentioned on several royal palace weights found at Nimrud. Another inscription was found that is thought to be his, but the name of the author is only partly preserved.	2 Kgs. 17:3, 2 Kgs. 18:9†
Shoshenq I	Pharaoh of Egypt	943–922	Virtually all scholars identify him with king Shishak in the Hebrew Bible. The account of Shoshenq/Shishak's invasion in the 5th year of Rehoboam correspond to an inscription found at Karnak of Shoshenq's campaign into Canaan.	1 Kgs. 11:40, 1 Kgs. 14:25, 2 Chron. 12:2–9†
Taharqa	Pharaoh of Egypt, King of Kush	690–664	Called "Tirhaka, the king of Kush" in the books of Kings and Isaiah. Several contemporary sources mention him and fragments of three statues bearing his name were excavated at Nineveh.	Is. 37:9, 2 Kgs. 19:9†
Tattenai	Governor of Eber-Nari	fl. 520	Known from contemporary Babylonian documents. He governed the Persian province west of the Euphrates river during the reign of Darius I.	Ezr. 5:3, Ezr. 6:13
Tiglath-Pileser III	King of Assyria	745–727	Also called "Pul" in Second Kings. Numerous writings are ascribed to him and he is mentioned, among others, in an inscription by Barrakab, king of Sam'al. He exiled inhabitants of the cities he captured in Israel.	2 Kgs. 15:19, 2 Kgs. 15:29, 2 Kgs. 16:7, 2 Kgs. 16:10, 1 Chr. 5:6
Uzziah	King of Judah	791–750	Uzziah's name appears in two unprovenanced iconic stone seals discovered in 1858 and 1863. The first is inscribed l’byw ‘bd / ‘zyw, "[belonging] to ’Abiyah, minister of ‘Uziyah", and the second (rev.) lšbnyw ‘ / bd ‘zyw, "[belonging] to Shubnayah, minister of ‘Uziyah. He suffered leprosy, and a major earthquake occurred during his reign in 760 BCE.	2 Kings 15:5, (Amos 1:1, NIV)
Xerxes I	King of Persia	486–465	Called Ahasuerus in the books of Ezra and Esther. Xerxes is known in archaeology through a number of tablets and monuments, notably the "Gate of All Nations" in Persepolis. He is also mentioned in Herodotus' Histories.	Est. 1:1, Dn. 9:1, Ezr. 4:6

== Deuterocanonicals ==
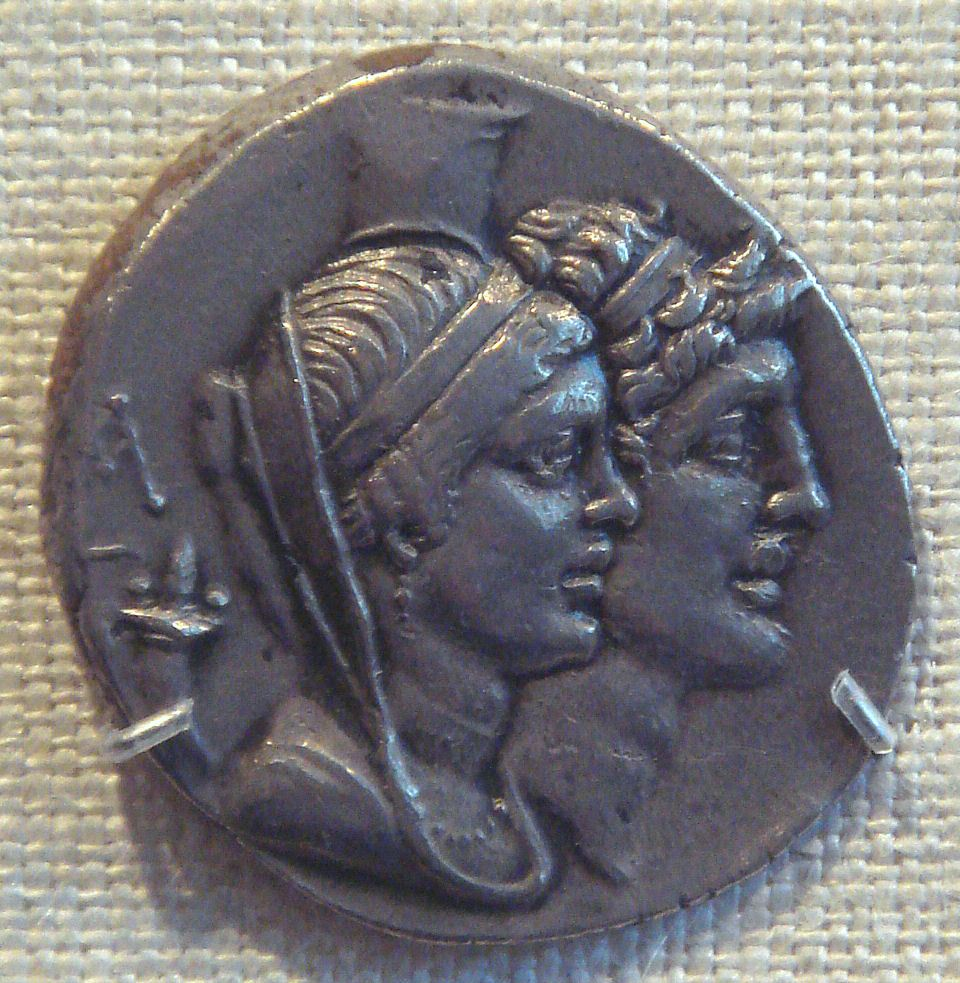
Cleopatra Thea with her first husband, Alexander Balas

While the deuterocanon describes events between the eighth and second centuries BCE, most historically identifiable people mentioned in the deuterocanon lived around the time of the Maccabean Revolt (167–160 BCE), during which Judea was part of the Seleucid Empire. Coins featuring the names of rulers had become widespread and many of them were inscribed with the year number in the Seleucid era, allowing them to be dated precisely.

First-hand information comes also from the Greek historian Polybius (c. 200 – c. 118 BCE), whose Histories covers much of the same period as the Books of Maccabees, and from Greek and Babylonian inscriptions. Josephus also discusses the Maccabean Revolt in some detail in Jewish Antiquities Book XII, although the Greek version of the book of 1 Maccabees was one of Josephus's main sources, so Antiquities is considered by some scholars a circular reference rather than truly independent confirmation.

Name (Note: Names that are also mentioned in the Hebrew Bible are not repeated here.)	Title	Date (BCE)	Attestation and Notes	Scriptural references
Alexander Balas	King of Asia (Note: The official title for kings of the Seleucid dynasty)	150–146	Pretended to be a son of Antiochus Epiphanes, as he is also described in 1 Maccabees. Mentioned in Polybius' Histories.	1 Macc. 10:1, 1 Macc. 11:1
Alexander the Great	King of Macedon	336–323	Referred to by Athenian orator Aeschines, and identified on his coins.	1 Macc. 1:1, 1 Macc. 6:2 1 Macc. 1:10†
Antiochus III the Great	King of Asia	222–187	Mentioned by contemporary historian Polybius. and coins with his name have survived.	1 Macc. 1:10, 1 Macc. 8:6
Antiochus IV Epiphanes	King of Asia	175–164	Known from Polybius' Histories and from contemporary coins.	1 Macc. 10:1, 2 Macc. 4:7
Antiochus V Eupator	King of Asia	163–161	Executed by his half-brother Demetrius I when he was 11 years old. Identified in an inscription from Dymi, and on contemporary coins.	2 Macc. 2:20, 2 Macc. 13:1
Antiochus VI Dionysus	King of Asia	145–142	Reigned only nominally, as he was very young when his father died, but he is identified on contemporary coins.	1 Macc. 11:39, 1 Macc. 12:39
Antiochus VII Sidetes	King of Asia	138–129	Dethroned the usurper Tryphon. Coinage from the period bears his name.	1 Macc. 15†
Ariarathes V	King of Cappadocia	163–130	Mentioned by Polybius.	1 Macc. 15:22†
Arsinoe III	Queen of Egypt	220–204	Married to her brother, Ptolemy IV. Several contemporary inscriptions dedicated to them have been found.	3 Macc. 1:1, 3 Macc. 1:4†
Astyages	King of Medes	585–550	The contemporary Chronicle of Nabonidus refers to the mutiny on the battlefield as the cause for Astyages' overthrow.	Bel and the Dragon 1:1†
Attalus II Philadelphus	King of Pergamon	160–138	Known from the writings of Polybius.	1 Macc. 15:22†
Cleopatra Thea	Queen of Asia	126–121	First married to Alexander Balas, later to Demetrius II and Antiochus VII, she became sole ruler after Demetrius' death. Her name and portrait appear on period coinage.	1 Macc. 10:57–58†
Darius III	King of Persia	336–330	Last king of the Achaemenid Empire, defeated by Alexander the Great. Mentioned in the Samaria Papyri.	1 Macc. 1:1†
Demetrius I Soter	King of Asia	161–150	A cuneiform tablet dated to 161 BCE refers to him, and Polybius, who personally interacted with Demetrius, mentions him in his Histories.	1 Macc. 7:1, 1 Macc. 9:1
Demetrius II Nicator	King of Asia	145–138, 129 – 126	Ruled over part of the kingdom, simultaneously with Antiochus VI and Tryphon. He was defeated by Antiochus VII, but regained the throne in 129 BCE. Mentioned in the Babylonian Astronomical Diaries.	1 Macc. 11:19, 1 Macc. 13:34
Diodotus Tryphon	King of Asia	142–138	Usurped the throne after the death of Antiochus VI. Although Antiochus VII melted down most of his coins, some have been found in Orthosias.	1 Macc. 11:39, 1 Macc. 12:39
Eumenes II Soter	King of Pergamom	197–159	Several of his letters have survived, and he is mentioned by Polybius.	1 Macc. 8:8†
Heliodorus	Seleucid legate	fl. 178	Identified in contemporary inscriptions.	2 Macc. 3:7, 2 Macc. 5:18
Mithridates I	King of Parthia	165–132	Also called Arsaces. He captured Demetrius II as recorded in the Babylonian Astronomical Diaries.	1 Macc. 14:2–3, 1 Macc. 15:22†
Perseus	King of Macedon	179–168	Son of Philip V. Mentioned by Polybius. and identified on his coins.	1 Macc. 8:5†
Philip II	King of Macedon	359–336	Father of Alexander the Great. Known from contemporary coins, and mentioned by Aeschines.	1 Macc. 1:1, 1 Macc. 6:2†
Philip V	King of Macedon	221–179	His name appears on his coins, and in Polybius' Histories.	1 Macc. 8:5†
Ptolemy IV Philopator	King of Egypt	221–204	Mentioned together with his wife and sister Arsinoe III in contemporary inscriptions from Syria and Phoenicia.	3 Macc. 1:1, 3 Macc. 3:12
Ptolemy VI Philometor	King of Egypt	180–145	Referred to in ancient inscriptions, and mentioned by Polybius.	1 Macc. 1:18, 2 Macc. 9:29
Simon II	High Priest of Israel	Late 3rd century – early 2nd century	Praised in Sirach for his apparent role in repairing and fortifying the Temple in Jerusalem, also briefly mentioned in Josephus' Antiquities.	3 Macc. 2:1, Sirach 50:1, Sirach 50:20 †

== New Testament ==
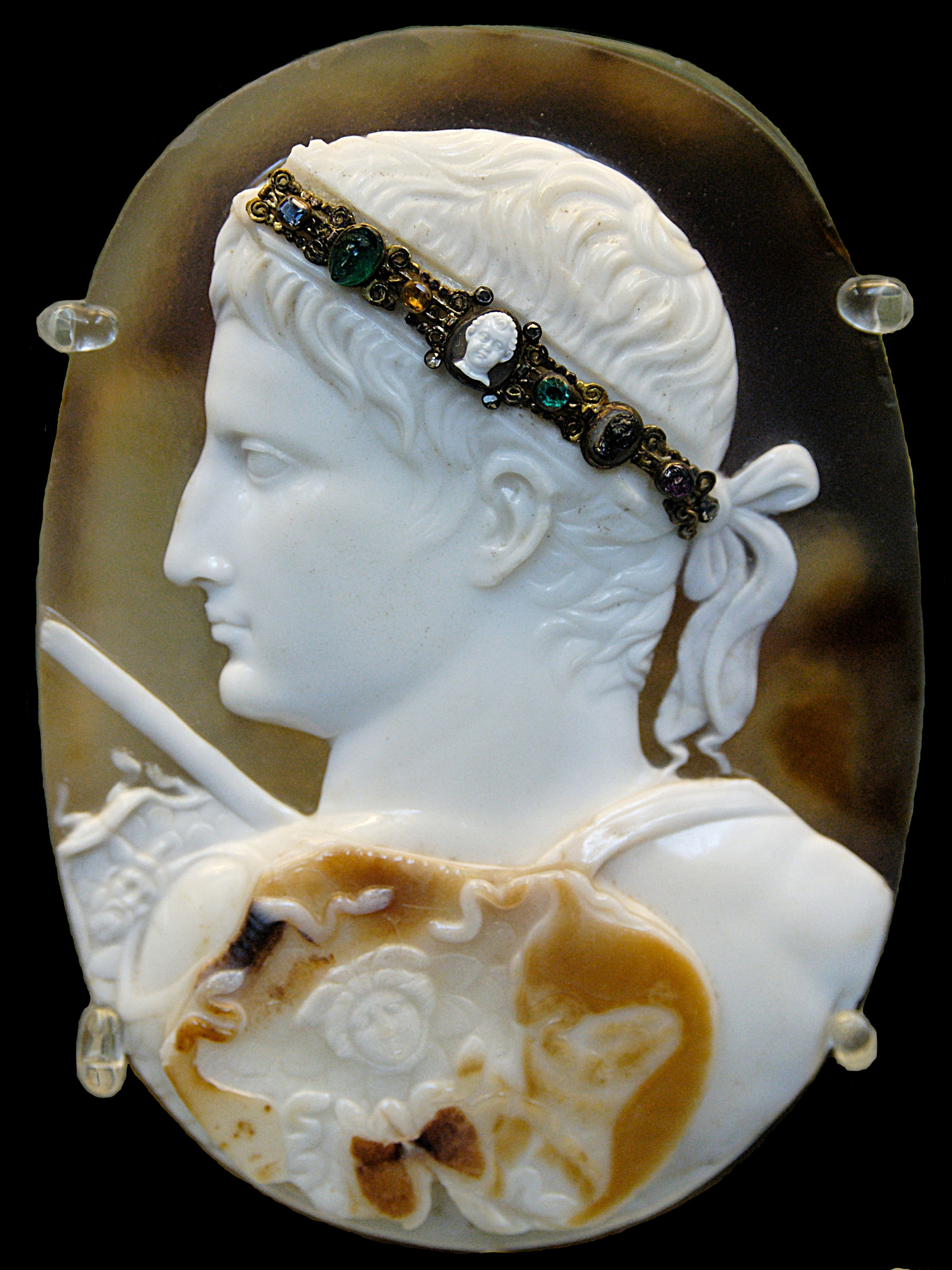
The Blacas Cameo (20–50 CE) depicting Roman emperor Augustus

By far the most important and most detailed sources for first-century Jewish history are the works of Jewish historian Flavius Josephus (37 – c. 100 CE). These books mention many of the same prominent political figures as the New Testament books and are crucial for understanding the historical background of the emergence of Christianity. Josephus also mentions Jesus and the execution of John the Baptist although he was not a contemporary of either. Apart from Josephus, information about some New Testament figures comes from Roman historians such as Tacitus and Suetonius and from ancient coins and inscriptions.

=== Persons mentioned in the Gospels ===
Name (Note: Names that are also mentioned in the Old Testament are not repeated here.)	Title	Attestation and Notes	Biblical references
Augustus Caesar	Emperor of Rome	Reigned between 27 BCE and 14 CE, during which time Jesus was born. He left behind a wealth of buildings, coins and monuments, including a funerary inscription in which he described his life and accomplishments. His life is also described in detail by several ancient Roman historians.	Lk. 2:1†
Caiaphas	High Priest of Israel	Mentioned by Josephus in the Antiquities of the Jews. In 1990, workers found an ornate limestone ossuary while paving a road in the Peace Forest south of the Abu Tor neighborhood of Jerusalem. This ossuary—referred to as the Caiaphas ossuary—contained the remains of an elderly man and has been declared by archaeologists to be authentic. An Aramaic inscription on the side was thought to read "Joseph son of Caiaphas" and on this basis the bones of an elderly man were considered to belong to the High Priest Caiaphas. In 2011, archaeologists from Bar-Ilan University announced the recovery of a stolen ossuary, It is inscribed with the text: "Miriam, daughter of Yeshua, son of Caiaphas, Priest of Ma’aziah from Beth ‘Imri".	Jn. 18:13; Jn. 11:49; Lk. 3:2
Herod Antipas	Tetrarch of Galilee and Perea	A son of Herod the Great. Mentioned in Antiquities and Wars of the Jews. Mark, Matthew, Luke and Josephus record that he killed John the Baptist.	Mk. 6:17, Mt. 14:9–10, Lk. 9:9
Herod Archelaus	Ethnarch of Judea, Samaria and Edom	A son of Herod the Great. He is known from the writings of Flavius Josephus and from contemporary coins.	Mt. 2:22
Herod the Great	King of Judea	Mentioned by his friend, the historian Nicolaus of Damascus and by Josephus in the Antiquities. His name is also found on contemporary Jewish coins.	Mt. 2:1, Lk. 1:5
Herodias	Herodian princess	The wife of Herod Antipas. According to the synoptic gospels, she was formerly married to Antipas's brother Philip, apparently Philip the Tetrarch. However, Josephus writes that her first husband was Herod II. Many scholars view this as a contradiction, but some have suggested that Herod II was also called Philip.	Mt. 14:3, Mk. 6:17
James the Just	Bishop of Jerusalem and relative of Jesus	The brother (or stepbrother or cousin, depending on the interpretation) of Jesus and the first Bishop of Jerusalem. He is mentioned by Josephus in the Antiquities, which state that he was arrested and stoned to death by order of High Priest Ananus ben Ananus. Ananus's decision angered Roman procurator Lucceius Albinus and local king Herod Agrippa II, who had him removed from his post.	Mk 6:3, Mt 13:55–56, Gal 1:19
Jesus of Nazareth	God the Son, the Messiah, and son of Mary	The person after whom Christianity is named. He was a Jewish itinerant preacher who clashed with the Pharisees. The Jewish authorities arrested him and handed him over to Roman prefect Pontius Pilate, who had him crucified. Jesus is mentioned by Josephus in the Antiquities and by Tacitus in his Annals. There is also a reference to a 'Chresto' in Suetonius' The Twelve Caesars, perhaps the historical Jesus of Nazareth.	Mt. 1:1, Mk. 1:1, Lk. 1:31, Jn. 1:17
John the Baptist	Jewish itinerant preacher	A Jewish itinerant preacher, known for having baptized Jesus. He is mentioned by Josephus in the Antiquities, which state that he was arrested and executed by order of the ethnarch of Galilea Herod Antipas.	All four Gospels
Philip the Apostle	Bishop of Hierapolis	On 27 July 2011, the Turkish news agency Anadolu reported that archaeologists had unearthed a tomb that the project leader claims to be the tomb of Saint Philip during excavations in Hierapolis close to the Turkish city Denizli. The Italian archaeologist, Professor Francesco D'Andria stated that scientists had discovered the tomb within a newly revealed church. He claimed that the design of the tomb and writings on its walls prove it belonged to the martyred apostle of Jesus.	Jn 12:21 Jn 1:43
Philip the Tetrarch	Tetrarch of Iturea and Trachonitis	Josephus writes that he shared the kingdom of his father with his brothers Herod Antipas and Herod Archelaus. His name and title appear on coinage from the period.	Lk. 3:1
Pontius Pilate	Prefect of Judea	He ordered Jesus's execution. A stone inscription was found that mentions his name and title: "[Po]ntius Pilatus, [Praef]ectus Iuda[ea]e" (Pontius Pilate, prefect of Judaea), see Pilate Stone. He is mentioned by his contemporary Philo of Alexandria in his Embassy to Gaius, by Josephus in The Jewish War and the Antiquities and by Tacitus in his Annals.	Mt. 27:2, Jn. 19:15–16
Publius Sulpicius Quirinius	Governor of Syria	Conducted a census while governing Syria as reported by Luke and Josephus, and confirmed by a tomb inscription of one Quintus Aemilius Secundus, who had served under him. He is mentioned by Josephus in the Antiquities and by Tacitus in the Annals.	Lk. 2:2
Salome	Herodian princess	A daughter of Herodias. Although she is not named in the Gospels, but referred to as 'the daughter of Herodias', she is commonly identified with Salome, Herodias' daughter, mentioned in Josephus' Antiquities.	Mt. 14:6, Mk. 6:22
Simon Peter	Peter the Apostle	A prominent apostle of Jesus. He is mentioned by Ignatius of Antioch's Letter to the Romans and to the Smyrnaeans, and the First Epistle to the Corinthians by Clement, who also says that Peter died as a martyr.	Mt. 4:18–20, Mt. 16
Tiberius Caesar	Emperor of Rome	Named in many inscriptions and on Roman coins. Among other accounts, some of his deeds are described by contemporary historian Velleius (died c. 31 CE).	Lk. 3:1

=== Persons mentioned in the New Testament outside the Gospels ===
Name (Note: Names that are also mentioned in the Gospels are not repeated here.)	Title	Attestation and Notes	Biblical references
Ananias son of Nedebaios	High Priest of Israel	He held the office between c. 47 and 59 CE, as recorded by Josephus, and presided over the trial of Paul.	Acts 23:2, Acts 24:1†
Antonius Felix	Procurator of Judea	Mentioned by historians Josephus, Suetonius and Tacitus He imprisoned the apostle Paul around the year 58 CE, two years before Porcius Festus replaced him.	Acts 23:24, Acts 25:14
Aretas IV Philopatris	King of the Nabateans	According to Paul, Aretas' governor in Damascus tried to arrest him. Besides being mentioned by Josephus, his name is found in several contemporary inscriptions and on numerous coins.	2 Cor. 11:32†
Berenice	Herodian princess	A daughter of Herod Agrippa I. She appears to have had almost equal power to her brother Herod Agrippa II (with whom she was rumored to have an incestuous relationship, according to Josephus) and is indeed called Queen Berenice in Tacitus's Histories.	Acts 25:23, Acts 26:30
Claudius Caesar	Emperor of Rome	Like other Roman emperors, his name is found on numerous coins and monuments, such as the Porta Maggiore in Rome.	Acts 11:28, Acts 18:2†
Drusilla	Herodian princess	Married to Antonius Felix, according to the Book of Acts and Josephus' Antiquities.	Acts 24:24†
Lucius Junius Gallio Annaeanus	Proconsul of Achaea	Seneca the Younger, his brother, mentions him in his epistles to Lucilius Junior. In Delphi, an inscription, dated to 52 CE, was discovered that records a letter by emperor Claudius, in which Gallio is also named as proconsul	Acts 18:12–17†
Gamaliel the Elder	Rabbi of the Sanhedrin	He is named as the father of Simon by Flavius Josephus in his autobiography. In the Talmud he is also described as a prominent member of the Sanhedrin.	Acts 5:34, Acts 22:3†
Herod Agrippa I	King of Judea	Although his name is given as Herod by Luke, (Note: i.e. the author of the Gospel of Luke and the Acts of the Apostles. See Authorship of Luke–Acts.) and as Agrippa by Josephus, the accounts both writers give about his death are so similar that they are commonly accepted to refer to the same person. Hence many modern scholars call him Herod Agrippa (I).	Acts 12:1, Acts 12:21
Herod Agrippa II	King of Judea	He ruled alongside his sister Berenice. Josephus writes about him in his Antiquities, and his name is found inscribed on contemporary Jewish coins.	Acts 25:23, Acts 26:1
Judas of Galilee	Galilean rebel	Leader of a Jewish revolt. Both the Book of Acts and Josephus tell of a rebellion he instigated in the time of the census of Quirinius.	Acts 5:37†
Nero Caesar	Emperor of Rome	Depicted in contemporary coins.	Rev. 13:18, 2 Thes. 2:3†
Paul the Apostle	Christian apostle	Mention by Ignatius of Antioch's Epistle to the Romans and Epistle to the Ephesians, Polycarp's Epistle to the Philippians, and in Clement of Rome's Epistle to the Corinthians, who also says that Paul suffered martyrdom and that he had preached in the East and in the Far West.	Gal. 1, 1 Cor. 1
Porcius Festus	Governor of Judea	Succeeded Antonius Felix, as recorded by Josephus and the Book of Acts.	Acts 24:27, Acts 26:25
Amanitore	Kandake of the Meroitic Kingdom of Kush	Known from her monuments, pyramid, and monumental depictions.	Acts. 8:27
Epicurus	Greek Philosopher, founder of Epicureanism.	Known from several inscriptions, and the contemporary writings of his followers.	Acts. 17:18

== Tentatively identified ==
These are Biblical figures for which tentative but likely identifications have been found in contemporary sources based on matching names and credentials. The possibility of coincidental matching of names cannot be ruled out however.

=== Hebrew Bible (Protocanonical Old Testament) ===
Timeline showing the kings of Israel and Judah according to the chronology from Edwin R. Thiele. Kings that are known from contemporary extra-biblical sources are highlighted in yellow. Tentatively identified kings are highlighted in orange.

- Amariah son of Hezekiah, an ancestor of the prophet Zephaniah mentioned in the genealogy of Zephaniah 1:1. A late 8th – early 7th century BCE bulla reading "[belonging to] Amaryahu, son of the King" might refer to him.
- Asaiah, servant of king Josiah (2 Kings 22:12). A seal with the text Asayahu servant of the king probably belonged to him.
- Azaliah son of Meshullam, scribe in the Temple in Jerusalem: Mentioned in 2 Kings 22:3 and 2 Chronicles 34:8. A bulla reading "belonging to Azaliahu son of Meshullam." is likely to be his, according to archaeologist Nahman Avigad.
- Azariah son of Hilkiah and grandfather of Ezra: Mentioned in 1 Chronicles 6:13,14; 9:11 and Ezra 7:1. A bulla reading Azariah son of Hilkiah is likely to be his, according to Tsvi Schneider.
- Baalis king of Ammon is mentioned in Jeremiah 40:14. In 1984 an Ammonite seal, dated to c. 600 BCE, was excavated in Tell El-`Umeiri, Jordan that reads "belonging to Milkomor, the servant of Baalisha". Identification of 'Baalisha' with the biblical Baalis is likely, but it is not currently known if there was only one Ammonite king of that name.
- Ben-Hadad I, was identified by William F. Albright as the "Bar-Hadad, son of [...], king of Aram" mentioned on the Melqart stele; however, several other scholars, such as Kenneth Kitchen, dispute this identification, as the stele's inscription is damaged and there is no outside evidence supporting this conclusion.
- David, or more accurately his royal house, is mentioned in the Tel Dan Stele, see above entry for Ahaziah.
- Darius II of Persia, is mentioned by the contemporary historian Xenophon of Athens, in the Elephantine Papyri, and other sources. 'Darius the Persian', mentioned in Nehemiah 12:22, is probably Darius II, although some scholars identify him with Darius I or Darius III.
- Gedaliah son of Ahikam, governor of Judah. A seal impression with the name 'Gedaliah who is over the house' is commonly identified with Gedaliah, son of Ahikam.
- Gedaliah son of Pashhur, an opponent of Jeremiah. A bulla bearing his name was found in the City of David
- Gemariah (son of Shaphan), son of Shaphan the scribe. A bulla was found with the text "To Gemaryahu ben Shaphan". This may have been the same person as "Gemariah son of Shaphan the scribe" mentioned in Jeremiah 36:10,12.
- Geshem (Gusham) the Arab, mentioned in Nehemia 6:1,6 is likely the same person as Gusham, king of Kedar, found in two inscriptions in Dedan and Tell el-Mashkutah (near the Suez Canal)
- Isaiah, In February 2018 archaeologist Eilat Mazar announced that she and her team had discovered a small seal impression which reads "[belonging] to Isaiah nvy" (could be reconstructed and read as "[belonging] to Isaiah the prophet") during the Ophel excavations, just south of the Temple Mount in Jerusalem. The tiny bulla was found "only 10 feet away" from where an intact bulla bearing the inscription "[belonging] to King Hezekiah of Judah" was discovered in 2015 by the same team. Although the name "Isaiah" in Paleo-Hebrew alphabet is unmistakable, the damage on the bottom left part of the seal causes difficulties in confirming the word "prophet" or a common Hebrew name "Navi", casting some doubts whether this seal really belongs to the prophet Isaiah.
- Jehucal son of Shelemiah, an opponent of Jeremiah. Archaeologists excavated a bulla with his name, but some scholars question the dating of the seal to the time of Jeremiah.
- Jerahmeel, prince of Judah. A bulla bearing his name was found.
- Jezebel, wife of king Ahab of Israel. A seal was found that may bear her name, but the dating and identification with the biblical Jezebel is a subject of debate among scholars.
- Josiah, king of Judah. Three seals were found that may have belonged to his son Eliashib.
- Nathan-melech, one of Josiah's officials in 2 Kings 23:11. A clay bulla dated to the middle of the seventh or beginning of the sixth century BCE was found in March 2019 during the Givati Parking Lot dig excavation in the City of the David area of Jerusalem bearing the inscription, "(belonging) to Nathan-melech, servant of the king."
- Nergal-sharezer, king of Babylon is probably identical to an official of Nebuchadnezzar II mentioned in Jeremiah 39:3, 13. A record of his war with Syria was found on a tablet from the 'Neo-Babylonian Chronicle texts'.
- Seraiah son of Neriah. He was the brother of Baruch. Nahman Avigad identified him as the owner of a seal with the name "to Seriahu/Neriyahu".

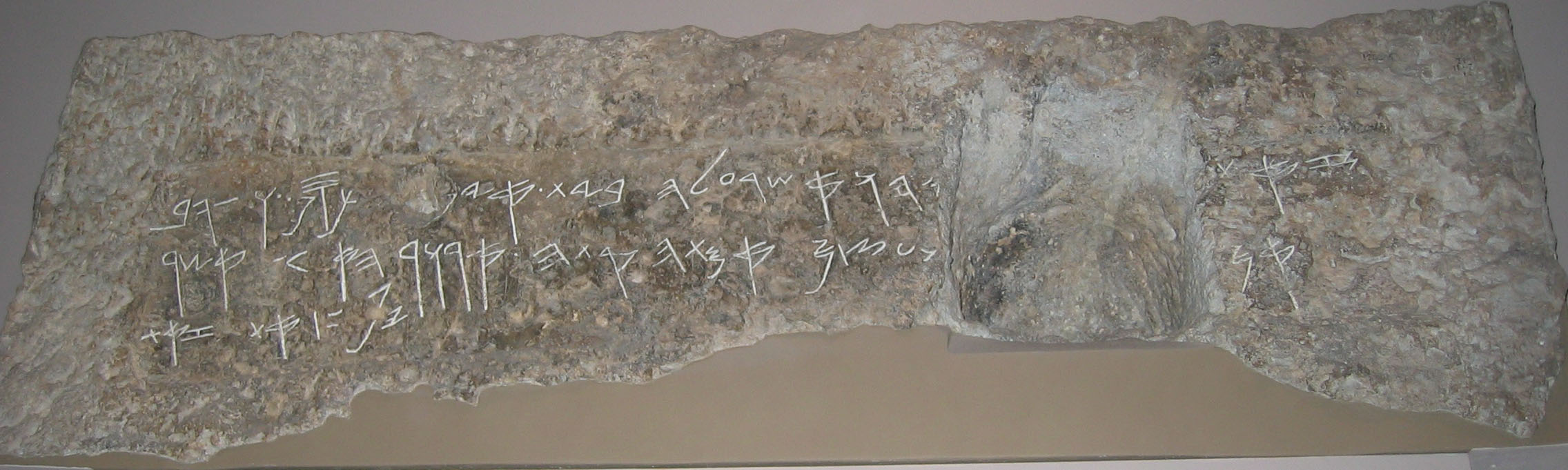
The so-called Shebna Lintel

- Shebna (or Shebaniah), royal steward of Hezekiah: only the last two letters of a name (hw) survive on the so-called Shebna lintel, but the title of his position ("over the house" of the king) and the date indicated by the script style, have inclined many scholars to identify the person it refers to with Shebna.
- Shelomith, a daughter of Zerubbabel mentioned in the genealogy of 1 Chronicles 3:19. She has been identified with the owner of a seal reading "Belonging to Shelomith, maidservant of Elnathan the governor".
- Tou/Toi, king of Hamath. Several scholars have argued that Tou/Toi, mentioned in 2 Samuel 8:9 and 1 Chronicles 18:9, is identical with a certain 'Taita', king of 'Palistin', known from inscriptions found in northern Syria. However, others have challenged this identification based on linguistic analysis and the uncertain dating of king Taita.
- Zedekiah, son of Hananiah (Jeremiah 36:12). A seal was found of "Zedekiah son of Hanani", identification is likely, but uncertain.

=== Deuterocanonicals or biblical apocrypha ===
- Ahikar, a sage mentioned in Tobit 1:21–22 and in the Aramaic Story of Ahikar. At Uruk (Warka), a Late Babylonian cuneiform tablet from the second century BCE mentions an Aramaic sage Aḫu’aqār under Esarhaddon (seventh century BCE). There are also references to one or more people named Ahī-yaqar in cuneiform texts from the time of Sennacherib and Esarhaddon, although the identification of this person (or people) with the sage Ahiqar is uncertain.
- Aretas I, King of the Nabataeans (fl. c. 169 BCE), mentioned in 2 Macc. 5:8, is probably referred to in an inscription from Elusa.

=== New Testament ===
- Alexander son of Simon of Cyrene (Mark 15:21): A burial cave in the Kidron Valley discovered in 1941 by E. L. Sukenik, belonging to Cyrenian Jews and dating before 70 CE, was found to have an ossuary inscribed twice in Greek "Alexander son of Simon". It cannot, however, be certain that this refers to the same person.
- 'The Egyptian', who was according to Acts 21:38 the instigator of a rebellion, also appears to be mentioned by Josephus, although this identification is uncertain.
- Erastus of Corinth (Romans 16:23): An inscription mentioning an Erastus was found in 1929 near a paved area northeast of the theater of Corinth, dated to the mid-first century and reads "Erastus in return for his aedileship paved it at his own expense." Some New Testament scholars have identified this aedile Erastus with the Erastus mentioned in the Epistle to the Romans but this is disputed by others.
- Joanna, wife of Chuza: An ossuary has been discovered bearing the inscription, "Johanna, granddaughter of Theophilus, the High Priest." It is unclear if this was the same Joanna since Johanna was the fifth most popular woman's name in Judaea.
- Lysanias was tetrarch of Abila around 28 CE, according to Luke (3:1). Because Josephus only mentions a Lysanias of Abila who was executed in 36 BCE, some scholars have considered this an error by Luke. However, one inscription from Abila, which is tentatively dated 14–29 CE, appears to record the existence of a later tetrarch called Lysanias.
- Sergius Paulus was proconsul of Cyprus (Acts 13:4–7), when Paul visited the island around 46–48 CE. Although several individuals with this name have been identified, no certain identification can be made. One Quintus Sergius Paulus, who was proconsul of Cyprus probably during the reign of Claudius (41–54 CE) is however compatible with the time and context of Luke's account.
- Theudas. The sole reference to Theudas presents a problem of chronology. In Acts of the Apostles, Gamaliel, a member of the sanhedrin, defends the apostles by referring to Theudas (Acts 5:36–8). The difficulty is that the rising of Theudas is here given as before that of Judas of Galilee, which is itself dated to the time of the taxation (c. 6–7 CE). Josephus, on the other hand, says that Theudas was 45 or 46, which is after Gamaliel is speaking, and long after Judas the Galilean.

== See also ==
- Biblical archaeology
- Biblical figures
- Chronology of Jesus
- Historicity of the Bible
- List of artifacts significant to the Bible
- List of burial places of Abrahamic figures
- List of people in both the Bible and the Quran

== Bibliography ==
- Clayton, Peter A. (2006). Chronicle of the Pharaohs: The Reign-by-Reign Record of the Rulers and Dynasties of Ancient Egypt. London: Thames & Hudson. ISBN 0-500-28628-0.
- Coogan, M. D.; Brettler, M. Z.; Newsom, C. A.; et al., eds. (2010). The New Oxford Annotated Bible with the Apocrypha (4th ed.). Oxford University Press. ISBN 9780195289602.
- Dodson, Aidan (2014). "The Coming of the Kushites and the Identity of Osorkon IV". In Pischikova, Elena (ed.). Thebes in the First Millennium BC PDF. Cambridge Scholars publishing. pp. 6–12. ISBN 978-1-4438-5404-7. Archived from the original on 2016-08-02.
- Edwards, I.E.S. (1982). "Egypt: from the Twenty-second to the Twenty-fourth Dynasty". In Edwards, I.E.S. (ed.). The Cambridge Ancient History (2nd ed.), vol. III, part 1. Cambridge University Press. pp. 534–581. ISBN 0-521-22496-9.
- Hallo, William W., ed. (1997–2002). The Context of Scripture. Brill. ISBN 9789004131057. OCLC 902087326. (3 Volumes)
- Flavius, Josephus. Antiquities of the Jews . Translated by Whiston, William.
- Kitchen, Kenneth A. (1996). The Third Intermediate Period in Egypt (1100–650 BC). Warminster: Aris & Phillips Limited. p. 608. ISBN 0-85668-298-5.
- Mitchell, T. C. (1991). "Israel and Judah c. 750–700 B.C.". In Edwards, I.E.S. (ed.). The Cambridge Ancient History (2nd ed.), vol. III, part 2. Cambridge University Press. pp. 322–370. ISBN 0-521-22717-8.
- Patterson, Richard D. (2003). "The Divided Monarchy: Sources, Approaches, and Historicity". In Grisanti, Michel A.; Howard, David M. (eds.). Giving the sense: understanding and using Old Testament historical texts. Kregel. pp. 179–200. ISBN 978-0-8254-2892-0.
- Polybius. Histories. Translated by Shuckburgh, Evelyn Shirley.
- Pritchard, James B., ed. (1969). Ancient Near Eastern Texts Relating to the Old Testament with Supplement (3d ed.). Princeton University Press. ISBN 9780691035031. OCLC 5342384.
- Schneider, Hans D. (1985). "A royal epigone of the 22nd Dynasty. Two documents of Osorkon IV in Leiden". Mélanges Gamal Eddin Mokhtar, vol. II. Institut français d'archéologie orientale du Caire. pp. 261–267.
- Theis, Christoffer (2020). "Contributions to the Vocabulary of the Old Testament: The Connection of the Name סוֹא with Greek Σηγωρ in 2 Kings 17, 4". Biblica. 101: 107–13.
