= Drusilla (disambiguation) =

Drusilla is a given name derived from the ancient Roman cognomen Drusilla, other uses are;

- Drusilla (beetle), a genus of beetles
- Drusilla (Buffy the Vampire Slayer), character from Buffy the Vampire Slayer
- Drusilla (Wonder Girl), incarnation of the DC Comics character Wonder Girl
- USS Drusilla (SP-372), a United States Navy patrol vessel in commission from 1917 to 1918
- "Drusilla", a 1935 story by William Faulkner, later merged into The Unvanquished

== See also ==
- Julia Drusilla (disambiguation)
