= Ventidius Cumanus =

1st century AD Roman procurator of Iudaea

Ventidius Cumanus (fl. 1st century AD) was the Roman procurator of Iudaea Province from AD 48 to c. AD 52. A disagreement between the surviving sources, the Jewish historian Josephus and the Roman Tacitus, makes it unclear whether his authority was over some or all of the province. Cumanus' time in office was marked by disputes between his troops and the Jewish population. Ventidius Cumanus failed to respond to an anti-Jewish murder in Samaritan territory which led to the violent conflict between Jews and Samaritans. Following an investigation by the governor of Syria, Gaius Ummidius Durmius Quadratus, Cumanus was sent to Rome for a hearing before the Emperor Claudius, who held him responsible for the violence and sentenced him to exile.

== Procuratorship of Iudaea ==
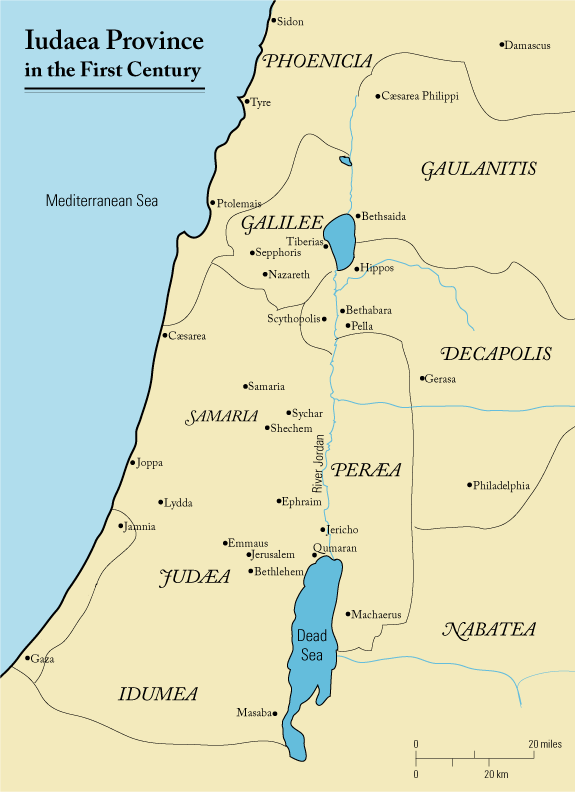
Iudaea Province in the 1st century

Nothing is known about Cumanus before he was appointed procurator of Iudaea in 48, in succession to Tiberius Julius Alexander.

=== Scope of authority ===
Josephus, the main source for Cumanus' career, presents him as governing the whole of Iudaea until 52, when he was succeeded by Marcus Antonius Felix. However, Tacitus states that Felix was already governing Samaria before 52, while Cumanus had authority over Galilee to the north (see map). Tacitus does not mention who controlled other areas of the province.

This conflict has led historians to take a number of positions on political arrangements in the province. Some have argued that Josephus' greater knowledge of Jewish affairs justifies favouring his account. M. Aberbach believes that there was a division of power, but that Tacitus reversed the governors' areas of authority and that Cumanus actually governed the south and Felix the north; this fits better with Josephus, who describes Cumanus as active in Jerusalem and nearby. Another suggestion is that part of the province was transferred to Felix after disturbances under Cumanus' rule.

=== Roman–Jewish conflict ===
Under Alexander, the province of Iudaea had enjoyed a period of relative peace, but that proved to be transient, as Cumanus's governorship was marked by a series of serious public disturbances. Trouble started while Jewish pilgrims were gathered in Jerusalem for the Passover feast. Cumanus, following the precedent set by earlier governors, assembled a detachment of Roman soldiers on the roof of the Temple portico to maintain order among the crowds, but one caused chaos by exposing himself to the Jews in the courtyard while calling out insults. Some of the Jews brought their complaints to Cumanus, but others began to retaliate by hurling stones at the soldiers. Some openly accused Cumanus of being responsible for the provocation – a sign that relations between governor and provincials may already have been poor. Finding himself unable to calm the angry crowd, Cumanus called for fully armed reinforcements, who assembled either in the Temple courtyard or on the roof of the Antonia Fortress, overlooking the Temple. In the ensuing stampede, according to Josephus' estimates, between twenty and thirty thousand people were crushed to death. The loss of life was substantial; the feast, says Josephus, "became the cause of mourning to the whole nation".

Further unrest was triggered when an Imperial slave named Stephanus was robbed while travelling near Beth-horon. Troops sent by Cumanus to arrest the leading men of the nearby villages began plundering the area. One of them, finding a copy of the Torah, destroyed it in view of the villagers while shouting blasphemies. Angered by this insult to God and to the Jewish religion, a crowd of Jews confronted Cumanus at Caesarea Maritima, demanding that the guilty party should be punished. This time the governor acted decisively and ordered that the soldier responsible should be beheaded in front of his accusers, temporarily restoring the calm.

=== Jewish–Samaritan conflict ===
The events that would cost Cumanus his office began with the murder of one or more Galilean pilgrims who had been travelling through Samaria on their way to Jerusalem. A Galilean embassy asked Cumanus to investigate but received little attention; Josephus alleges that he had been bribed by the Samaritans to turn a blind eye. The result was that a crowd of Jews decided to take the law into their own hands. Under the leadership of two Zealots, Eleazar and Alexander, they invaded Samaria and began a massacre. Cumanus led most of his troops against the militants, killing many and taking others prisoner, and the Jewish leaders from Jerusalem were subsequently able to calm most of the others, but a state of guerrilla warfare persisted.

Meanwhile, two separate embassies had been dispatched to Tyre to appeal to Ummidius Caius Quadratus, who as legatus pro praetore or governor of Syria had some authority over the lower-ranking procurator of Iudaea. One, from the Samaritans, protested the Jewish attacks on Samaritan villages. The Jewish counter-embassy held the Samaritans responsible for the violence and accused Cumanus of siding with them. Agreeing to investigate, Quadratus proceeded in 52 to Iudaea, where he had all of Cumanus's Jewish prisoners crucified and ordered the beheading of several other Jews and Samaritans who had been involved in the fighting.

Perhaps after hearing a case against Cumanus in Iudaea, Quadratus sent him, along with several Jewish and Samaritan leaders including the High Priest Ananias, to plead their cases in Rome before the Emperor Claudius. At the hearing, several of Claudius's influential freedmen officials took the side of Cumanus. However, the Jews were supported by Agrippa II, a friend of Claudius whose father, Agrippa I, had been the last king of Iudaea before the province was placed under Roman procurators. Whether influenced by court politics or not, Claudius decided in favour of the Jewish side. The Samaritan leaders were executed and Cumanus was sent into exile. Felix succeeded him as procurator of Iudaea. Cumanus's life and career after his banishment are unknown.

== See also ==
- Prefects, Procurators, and Legates of Roman Judaea

== Notes ==
Preceded by Tiberius Julius Alexander	Procurator of Iudaea; 48–c. 52	Succeeded by Marcus Antonius Felix
