= Acts 24 =

- ← chapter 23 chapter 25 →
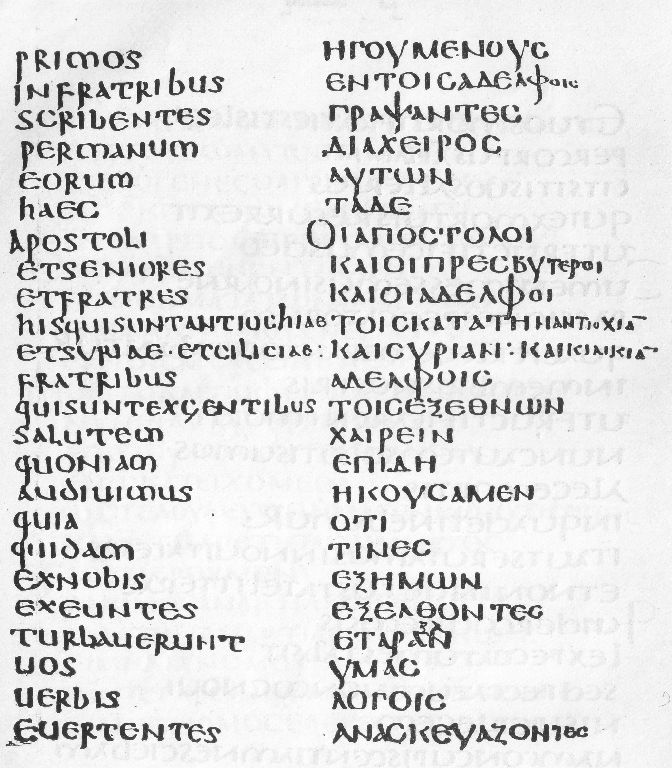
- Acts 15:22–24 in Latin (left column) and Greek (right column) in Codex Laudianus, written about AD 550.
- Book: Acts of the Apostles
- Category: Church history
- Christian Bible part: New Testament
- Order in the Christian part: 5

Acts 24 is the twenty-fourth chapter of the Acts of the Apostles in the New Testament of the Christian Bible. It records the period of Paul's imprisonment in Caesarea. Early Christian tradition uniformly affirmed that Luke composed this book as well as the Gospel of Luke. Critical opinion on the tradition was evenly divided at the end of the 20th century.

== Text ==
The original text was written in Koine Greek. This chapter is divided into 27 verses.

=== Textual witnesses ===
Some early manuscripts containing the text of this chapter are:

- Codex Vaticanus (AD 325–350)
- Codex Sinaiticus (330–360)
- Codex Bezae (c. 400)
- Codex Alexandrinus (400–440)
- Codex Ephraemi Rescriptus (c. 450; extant verses 16–27)
- Codex Laudianus (c. 550)

== Location ==
Location of Caesarea (with Jerusalem as reference)

The events in this chapter took place in Caesarea.

== Context ==
In the previous chapters, Paul has been accused of contra-Jewish teaching and practice: he "teaches all men everywhere against the people, the law, and this place; and furthermore he also brought Greeks into the temple and has defiled this holy place". He has responded with his own statement of defense (Acts 22) but the contents of his speech "prove too much" for his Jewish audience and they "resume their riotous behaviour" (Acts 22:22-23). Paul has been detained, initially within the Roman barracks in Jerusalem, and then in Caesarea, some 110 kilometres (68 mi) from the Jewish capital. He has asserted that by birth he is a Roman citizen (Acts 22:25-28), and his trial therefore needs to be undertaken in recognition of his citizenship. The narrator's intention is to progress the story of Paul's transfer to Rome for trial. As Acts 23 ends, the Roman governor, Antonius Felix, is awaiting the arrival of Paul's accusers from Jerusalem in order to commence a hearing. The venue of the hearing is now "much more in the Roman sphere than the Jewish".

== The speech for the prosecution (verses 1–9) ==
The Sanhedrin sent a delegation to Felix, bringing a professional rhetor (KJV: orator; NRSV attorney) to make a formal rhetorical presentation on their behalf (verse 1).

=== Verse 1 ===
And after five days Ananias the high priest descended with the elders, and with a certain orator named Tertullus, who informed the governor against Paul.

This "Ananias, the high priest" (verse 1; cf. 23:2) was Ananias son of Nebedaeus, who was appointed by Herod of Chalcis in AD 47, and replaced in 59.

=== Verses 2-3 ===
^{2} And when he was called upon, Tertullus began his accusation, saying: "Seeing that through you we enjoy great peace, and prosperity is being brought to this nation by your foresight, ^{3} we accept it always and in all places, most noble Felix, with all thankfulness."

The King James Version states that "he was called forth", referring to Paul being called to hear the accusation against him. Thus the New Living Translation opens verse 2 with "Paul was called in". Alternatively, the Living Bible suggests that the words refer to Tertullus being called forward.

=== Verse 5 ===
For we have found this man a pestilent fellow, and a mover of sedition among all the Jews throughout the world, and a ringleader of the sect of the Nazarenes:

- "The sect of the Nazarenes" refers to the community in which Jesus had grown up (cf. Matthew 2:23). The appellation of "Nazarenes" for Christians is attested in the writing by Tertullian (Adv. Marc. 4.8).

== Paul's defense (verses 10–21) ==
When it is his turn to speak, Paul, like Tertullus, focuses his self-defence (apologia, verse 10) on events in Jerusalem, stating that he has not been involved in disputes or riots in synagogue or temple (verse 12), and, "as Luke takes pains to show, no offence against the law can be proved against him" (verse 13). "By a simple narrative, Paul overthrows the exaggerated accusation" made against him.

=== Verse 10 ===
Then the governor motioned to him to speak and Paul replied, "I know that you have been a judge over this nation for many years and so I am pleased to make my defense before you."

The dignified, calm, and wise manner in which Paul speaks has been noted by several writers. Felix's "many years" probably amounted to six or seven years.

== Felix defers judgement (verses 22–27) ==
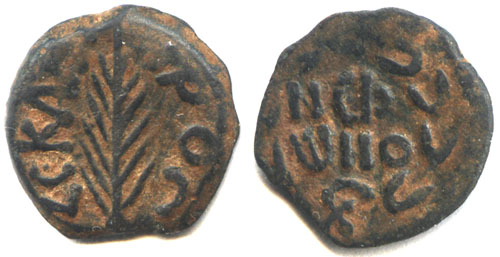
Bronze prutah minted by Antonius Felix in Nero's third year (date: LC; 56/57 AD).

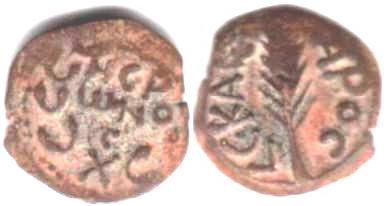
Bronze prutah minted by Porcius Festus in Nero's fifth year (date: LE; 58/59 AD)

When prosecution and defense have presented their cases, Felix the procurator 'refuses to be drawn into making a judgement', first 'on the pretext of waiting for the tribune's report' (verse 22), but then 'no more is heard of this'. According to custom at that time, Paul could be released at the end of Felix's term of office (verse 27), yet 'Felix deliberately leaves the case for his successor'.

=== Verse 27 ===
But after two years Porcius Festus succeeded Felix; and Felix, wanting to do the Jews a favor, left Paul bound.

- "Porcius Festus": the procurator of Judea succeeding Antonius Felix. His exact time in office is not known, with the earliest proposed date for the start of his term c. AD 55–6, while the latest is AD 61, but most scholars opt for a date between 58 and 60, based on a change in the provincial coinage of Judaea attested for Nero's fifth year points to AD 59.

== See also ==
- Ananias son of Nedebeus
- Caesarea
- Claudius Lysias
- Drusilla
- Paul the Apostle
- Tertullus
- Acts 21, Acts 22, and Acts 23

== Sources ==
- Alexander, Loveday (2007). "62. Acts". In Barton, John; Muddiman, John (eds.). The Oxford Bible Commentary (first (paperback) ed.). Oxford University Press. pp. 1028–1061. ISBN 978-0-19-927718-6.
