= Egyptian (prophet) =

Jewish eschatological prophet

The Egyptian or Ha-Mitzri was a 1st-century Jewish prophetic figure, always described as a sign prophet or a messianic prophet. He is said to have assembled a sizable gathering of followers atop the Mount of Olives either in preparation of an assault of Jerusalem in order to establish himself as the ruler of the people, or in the expectation that he would miraculously cause the walls of the city to fall, allowing his followers to enter the city. This group was crushed by the Roman procurator of Judaea, Antonius Felix (ruled 52–60 CE), and the Egyptian fled, while many of his followers were killed and captured, with the remainder managing to flee and hide. The campaign was initially supported by Helena of Adiabene, but repressed by Herod Agrippa II.

== Sources ==
=== Josephus ===
Flavius Josephus says in his Jewish War (2.261–262):

There was an Egyptian false prophet that did the Jews more mischief than the former; for he was a cheat, and pretended to be a prophet also, and got together thirty thousand men that were deluded by him; these he led round about from the wilderness to the mount which was called the Mount of Olives. He was ready to break into Jerusalem by force from that place; and if he could but once conquer the Roman garrison and the people, he intended to rule them by the assistance of those guards of his that were to break into the city with him ... But Felix prevented his attempt, and met him with his Roman soldiers ... insomuch that when it came to a battle, the Egyptian ran away.

Josephus' Antiquities of the Jews (20.169–172) contains a second account that introduces significant differences:

Moreover, there came out of Egypt about this time to Jerusalem one that said he was a prophet, and advised the multitude of the common people to go along with him to the Mount of Olives, as it was called, which lay over against the city, and at the distance of five furlongs. He said further, that he would show them from hence how, at his command, the walls of Jerusalem would fall down; and he promised them that he would procure them an entrance into the city through those walls, when they were fallen down. Now when Felix was informed of these things, he ordered his soldiers to take their weapons, and came against them with a great number of horsemen and footmen from Jerusalem, and attacked the Egyptian and the people that were with him. He also slew four hundred of them, and took two hundred alive. But the Egyptian himself escaped out of the fight, but did not appear any more.

In The Acts of the Apostles, the commander (chiliarch, or military tribune) of the Roman garrison in Jerusalem, Claudius Lysias, confuses Paul with this Egyptian after detaining him during a disturbance near the temple (Acts 21:37–39). When Paul addresses him in Greek, Lysias reacts with surprise. Paul responds by identifying himself as a Jew from Tarsus in Cilicia, "a citizen of no insignificant city" (Acts 21:39), thereby implying that he is not the Egyptian.

Scholars disagree over the best English translation of Lysias' reaction in verse 38, which can be rendered either as an astonished question pressing Paul on his identity, "Are you not the Egyptian then...?" (cf. KJV, NIV, ESV) or as a revision of his prior assumption, "Then you are not the Egyptian...?" (cf. NRSV, NET, LSB).

Commentaries by Bruce, Conzelmann and Pervo argue that Paul's command of Greek causes Lysias to immediately reconsider his initial assumption that Paul was the Egyptian, while Clarke and Fitzmyer argue that Paul's identity is only fully clarified in verse 39. Fitzmyer affirms that the question in verse 38 initially expects a "yes" answer, citing BDF: "ouk ara denotes astonishment in Acts 21:38… 'why, are you not…?'"

== Analysis ==
Belgian Catholic theologian Edward Schillebeeckx OP (1914–2009) characterised this Egyptian as an 'Egyptian Jewish eschatological miracle-working prophet' who predicted the destruction of Jerusalem's walls akin to the falling walls of Jericho in Joshua 6, and compared the Egyptian to Theudas during Roman procurator Cuspius Fadus (44–46 CE), and another 'eschatological prophet who led his followers into the wilderness while promising miracles and liberation from all misery' during Roman procurator Porcius Festus (r. 59–62 CE).
