= Acts 25 =

- ← chapter 24 chapter 26 →
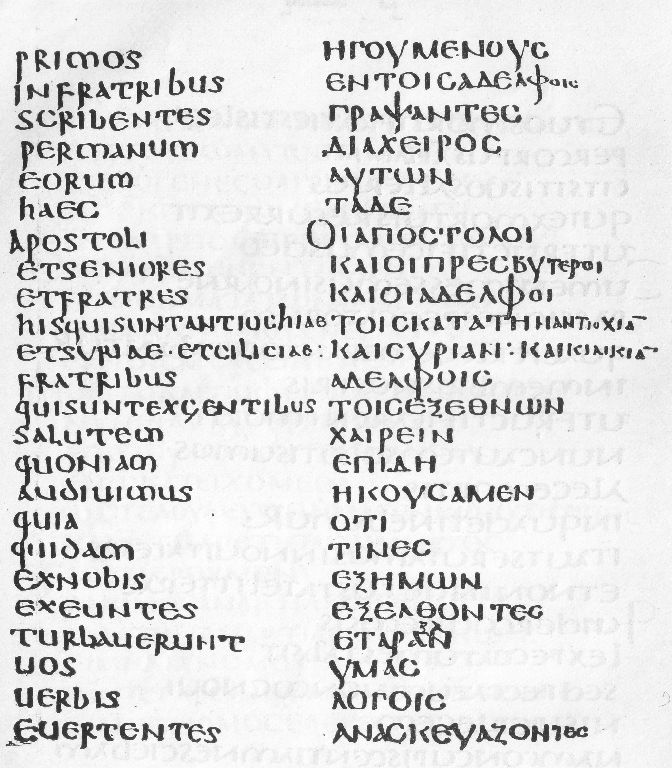
- Acts 15:22–24 in Latin (left column) and Greek (right column) in Codex Laudianus, written about AD 550.
- Book: Acts of the Apostles
- Category: Church history
- Christian Bible part: New Testament
- Order in the Christian part: 5

Acts 25 is the twenty-fifth chapter of the Acts of the Apostles in the New Testament of the Christian Bible. It records the period of Paul's imprisonment in Caesarea. Early Christian tradition uniformly affirmed that Luke composed this book as well as the Gospel of Luke.

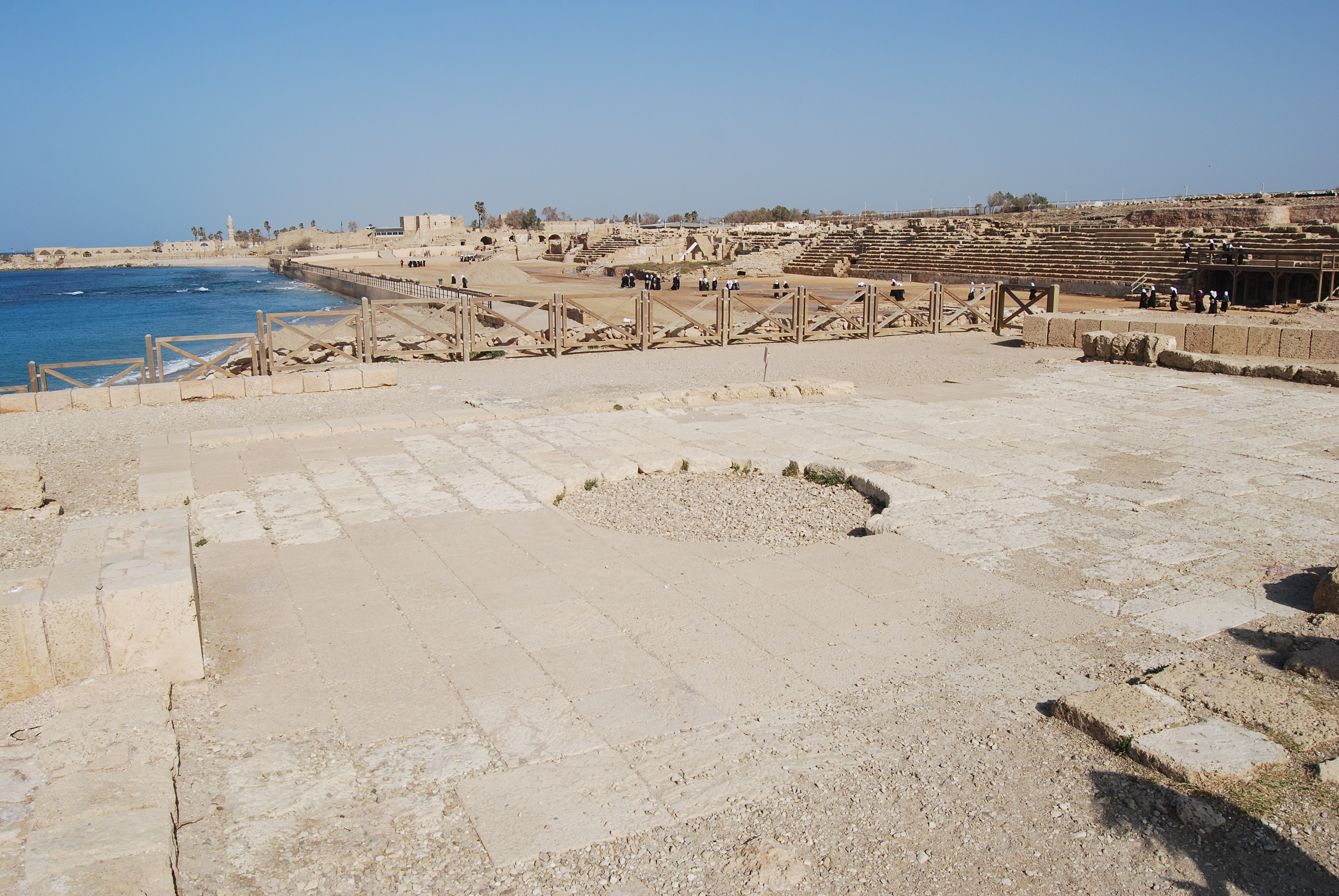
Site in Caesarea claimed to be the site of Paul's trial.

Critical opinion on the tradition was evenly divided at the end of the 20th century.

== Text ==
The original text was written in Koine Greek. This chapter is divided into 27 verses.

=== Textual witnesses ===
Some early manuscripts containing the text of this chapter are:

- Codex Vaticanus (AD 325–350)
- Codex Sinaiticus (330–360)
- Codex Bezae (c. 400)
- Codex Alexandrinus (400–440)
- Codex Ephraemi Rescriptus (c. 450)
- Codex Laudianus (c. 550)

== Locations ==
Location of Caesarea and Jerusalem

The events in this chapter took place in Caesarea and Jerusalem.

== Paul appeals to Caesar (verses 1–12) ==
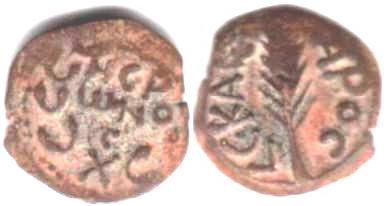
Bronze prutah minted by Porcius Festus in Nero's fifth year (AD 58/59)

Porcius Festus was the procurator of the province of Judea after Antonius Felix, as confirmed by first-century historian Josephus (Jewish War 2.271; Antiquities 20.182-8). His exact time in office is not known, with the earliest proposed date for the start of his term c. AD 55–6, while the latest is AD 61, but most scholars opt for a date between 58 and 60, based on a change in the provincial coinage of Judaea attested for Nero's fifth year points to AD 59.

Festus was eager to clean up problems left by his predecessor as well as to avoid any actions that compelled the Jewish community in Caesarea to send a delegation to Rome complaining about Felix's 'misdeeds against the Jews' (Josephus, Antiquities 20.182). Therefore, in keeping a good relation with the Jewish authorities (verses 2, 9) and in acting with all propriety related to Rome, Festus' decision to refer the case to Rome (to Caesar as the final court of appeal for provincials) is understandable.

== Agrippa and Bernice (verses 13–27) ==
Paul was almost set for the last journey to Rome as Festus has agreed to transfer his case to Rome (verse 12), but Paul had one more chance to make a defence of his case before the Jewish king Herod Agrippa II and his sister Bernice (verse 13), on the occasion of Agrippa's visit to Festus, and Festus's need of the king's expertise in drafting his report on the case (verse 27). Josephus records that Agrippa II (the son of Herod Agrippa I in Acts 12; Josephus, Jewish War, 2.247, 252) was a 'significant power-broker, both with Rome and with the Jewish community worldwide' (Jewish War, 2.245, Antiquities 20.135), acting as spokesperson for a Jewish delegation in Rome a few years earlier, and has a good relationship with Tiberius Julius Alexander, the prefecture of Egypt (Josephus, Jewish War, 2.309), who was a previous procurator of Judea and Bernice's brother-in-law. Bernice was the sister of Agrippa (and also of Drusilla, Felix's wife), currently a widow living at her brother's court (Josephus, Antiquities 20.145) and taking an active part in Jewish affairs (Josephus, Jewish War, 2.344). The Roman failure to find a case against Paul (verses 14—27) and Paul's own self-defence (26:1—29) before Agrippa II are set to 'demonstrate the fulfilment of the prophecy that Paul would have to testify "before kings" (Acts 9:15)'.

=== Verse 27 ===
[Festus said to Agrippa:] "For it seems to me unreasonable to send a prisoner and not to specify the charges against him."

== See also ==
- Agrippa II
- Antonius Felix
- Caesarea
- Bernice
- Jerusalem
- Paul the Apostle
- Acts 9, Acts 22, Acts 24, and Acts 26

== Sources ==
- Alexander, Loveday (2007). "62. Acts". In Barton, John; Muddiman, John (eds.). The Oxford Bible Commentary (first (paperback) ed.). Oxford University Press. pp. 1028–1061. ISBN 978-0199277186.
- Coogan, Michael David (2007). Coogan, Michael David; Brettler, Marc Zvi; Newsom, Carol Ann; Perkins, Pheme (eds.). The New Oxford Annotated Bible with the Apocryphal/Deuterocanonical Books: New Revised Standard Version, Issue 48 (Augmented 3rd ed.). Oxford University Press. ISBN 9780195288810.
