= Julia Drusilla (disambiguation) =

Julia Drusilla was the favorite sister of Roman emperor Caligula. Other uses are;

- "Julia Drusilla" (daughter of Juba II) (name disputed)
- Julia Drusilla (daughter of Ptolemy of Mauretania)
- Julia Drusilla (daughter of Herod Agrippa)
- Julia Drusilla (daughter of Caligula)

== See also ==
- Livia Drusilla, took the name Julia upon her adoption
- Drusilla, given name
