= Captatio benevolentiae =

Rhetorical technique

Captatio benevolentiae (Latin for "winning of goodwill") is a rhetorical technique aimed to capture the goodwill of the audience at the beginning of a speech or appeal. It was practiced by Roman orators, with Cicero considering it one of the pillars of oratory.

== Examples ==
For example, Roman historian Livy (Titus Livius) begins his prologue with a description of his own insignificance against the importance of the Roman people and history of Rome. By preaching his own humility, and especially by comparing himself to the much greater importance of the Roman people (his audience), he hopes to gain their favor at the start of his work.

The opening words of St. Paul's speech addressed to King Herod Agrippa II and his sister Berenice, in Acts 26:2-3, have been described as "a standard captatio benevolentiae":

I think myself happy, king Agrippa, because I shall answer for myself this day before thee touching all the things whereof I am accused of the Jews: Especially because I know thee to be expert in all customs and questions which are among the Jews: wherefore I beseech thee to hear me patiently. (King James Version)

During the Middle Ages, it was used in court cases to gain the judge's favor, with lavish praise of the judge's wisdom considered most effective by Guillaume Durand. In parallel, the techniques of the captatio benevolentiae began to be used in the prologues of chivalric romance novels, addressing the readers and trying to have them view the work favourably.
