= Papyrus 29 =

Papyrus 𝔓^{29}
- New Testament manuscript
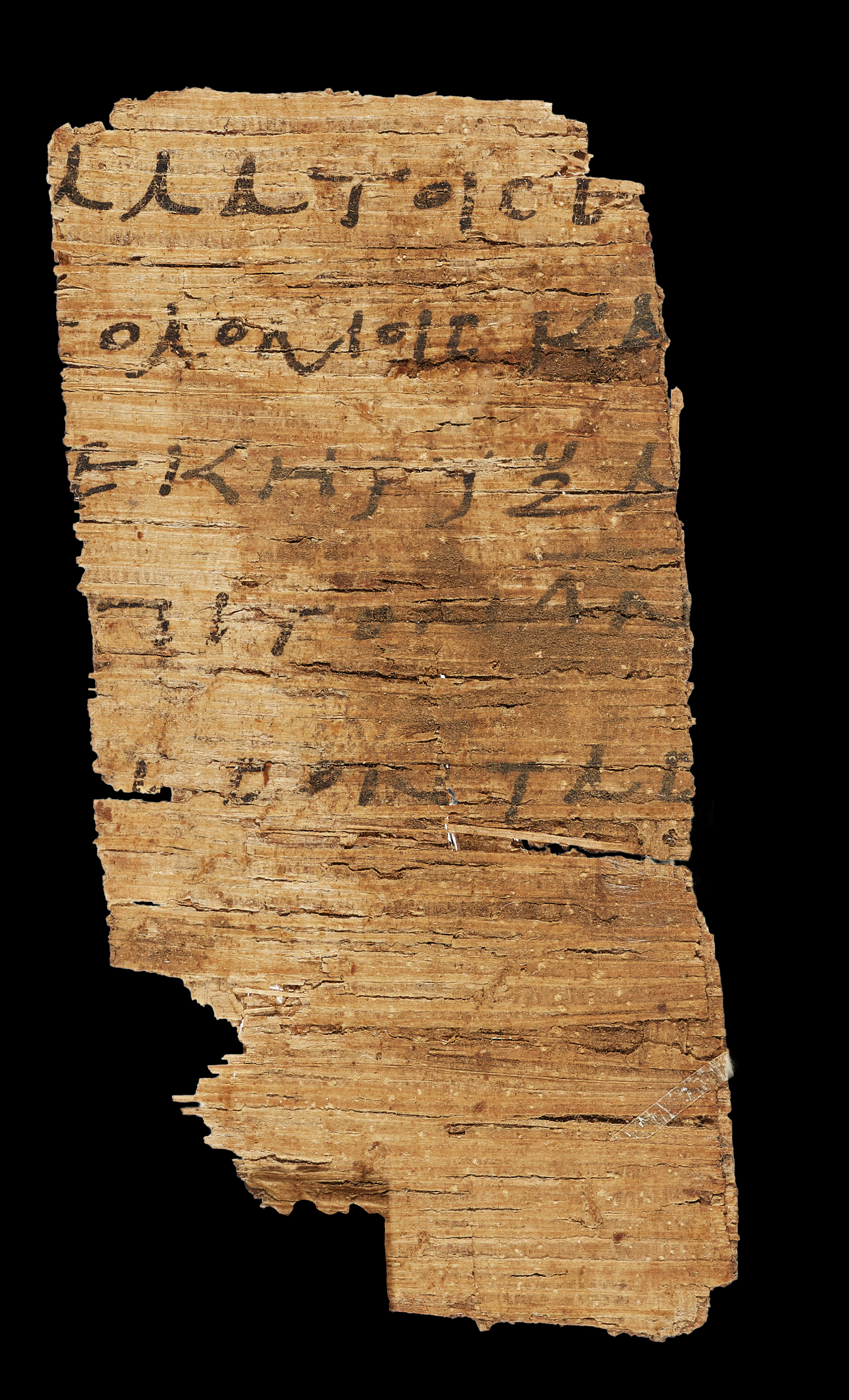
- (Papyrus 29) recto Acts 26:20
- Name: P. Oxy. 1597
- Text: Acts 26 †
- Date: 3rd century
- Script: Greek
- Found: Egypt
- Now at: Bodleian Library
- Cite: B. P. Grenfell & A. S. Hunt, Oxyrynchus Papyri XIII, (London 1919), pp. 10-12
- Size: 17 x 27 cm
- Type: Alexandrian, Western
- Category: I

Papyrus 29 (in the Gregory-Aland numbering), designated by 𝔓^{29}, is an early copy of the New Testament in Greek. It is a papyrus manuscript of the Acts of the Apostles which contains Acts 26:7-8 and 26:20. The manuscript paleographically has been assigned to the early 3rd century.

== Description ==
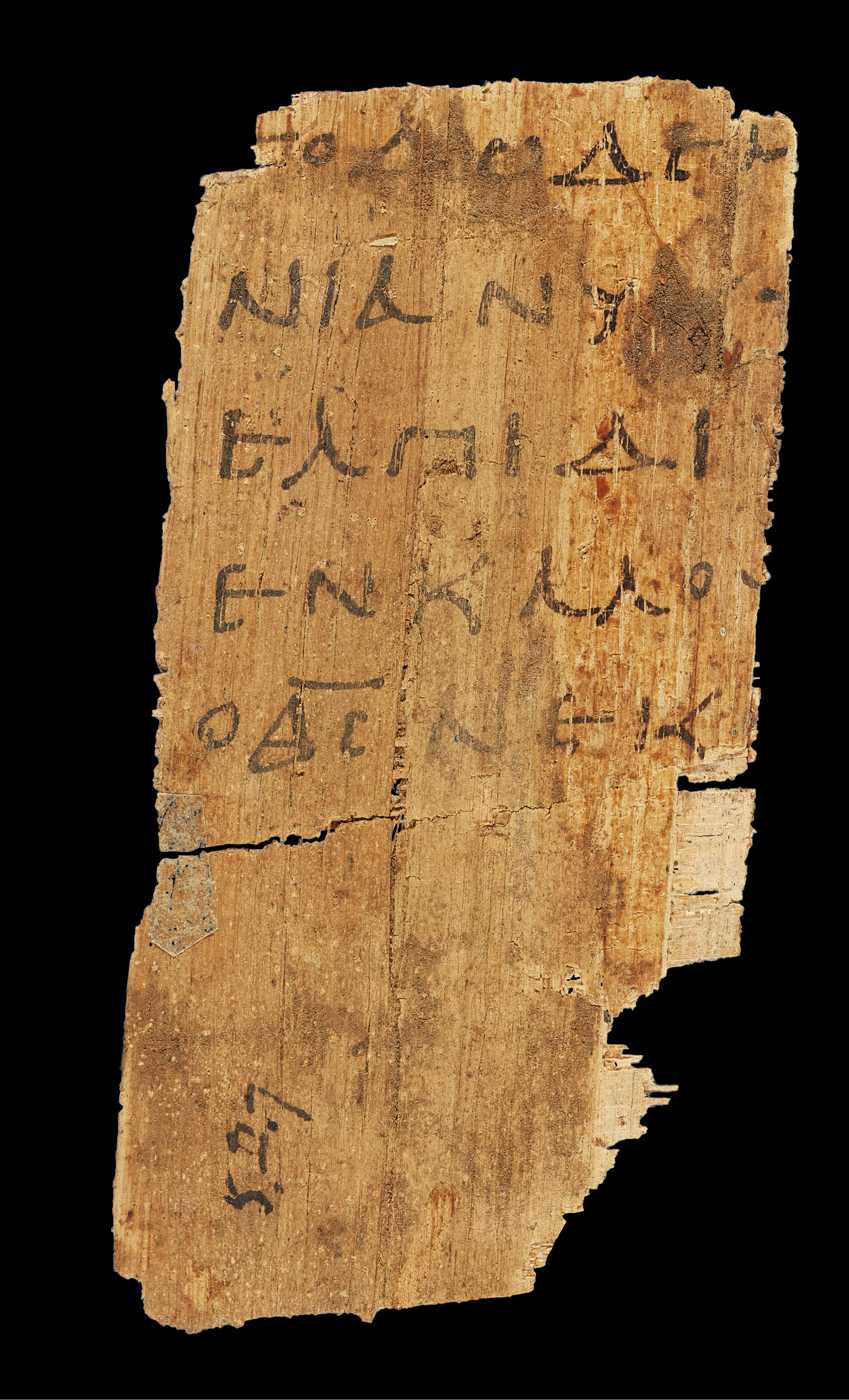
(Papyrus 29) verso Acts 26:7-8

The Greek text of this codex is too short to put in a family. Grenfell and Hunt noticed its agreement with Codex Bezae, 1597, and some Old-Latin manuscripts. According to Aland it is a "free text" and it was placed by him in Category I. According to Bruce M. Metzger and David Alan Black the manuscript might be related to the Western text-type, but Philip Comfort stated "the fragment is too small to be certain of its textual character".

It is currently housed at the Bodleian Library, Gr. bibl. g. 4 (P) in Oxford.

== See also ==
- Acts 26
- List of New Testament papyri
