= USS Drusilla =

Patrol vessel of the United States Navy

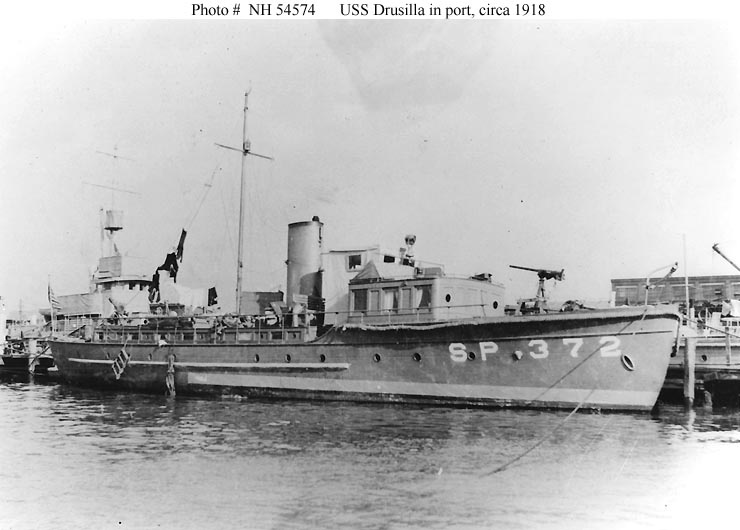
- USS Drusilla (SP-372) in port ca. 1918.

History

United States
- Name: USS Drusilla
- Namesake: Previous name retained
- Builder: New York Launch and Engine Company, Morris Heights, the Bronx, New York
- Completed: 1914
- Acquired: 22 May 1917
- Commissioned: 25 May 1917
- Decommissioned: 10 December 1918
- Fate: Returned to owner 12 December 1918
- Notes: Operated as private motorboat Drusilla 1914–1917 and from 1918

General characteristics
- Type: Patrol vessel
- Length: 83 ft 9 in (25.53 m)

USS Drusilla (SP-372) was a patrol vessel that served in the United States Navy from 1917 to 1918.

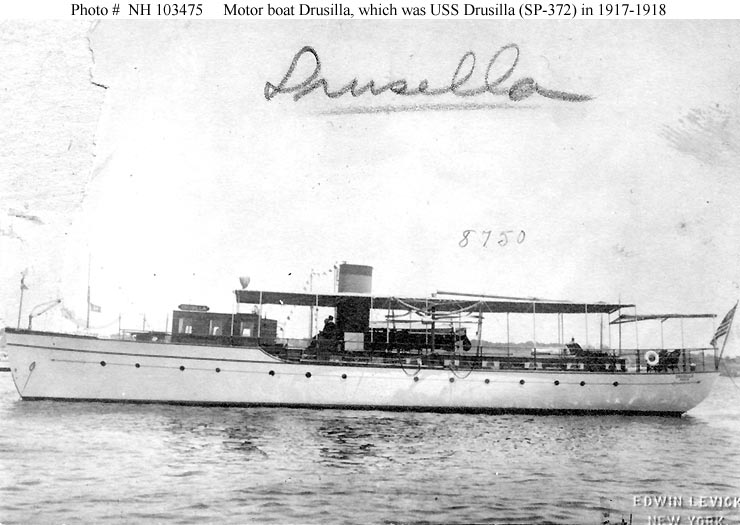
Drusilla as a private motorboat sometime between 1914 and 1917.

Drusilla was built as a private motorboat of the same name in 1914 by the New York Launch and Engine Company at Morris Heights in the Bronx, New York. On 22 May 1917, the U.S. Navy acquired her under a free lease from her owner, A. J. Drexel of Radnor, Pennsylvania, for use as a patrol boat during World War I. She was commissioned as USS Drusilla (SP-372) on 25 May 1917.

Assigned to the 4th Naval District, Drusilla served on the section patrol in the Delaware Bay area, performing harbor entrance and submarine net patrol duties for the remainder of World War I.

Drusilla was decommissioned on 10 December 1918. The Navy returned her to Drexel on 12 December 1918.
