= Acts 23 =

- ← chapter 22 chapter 24 →
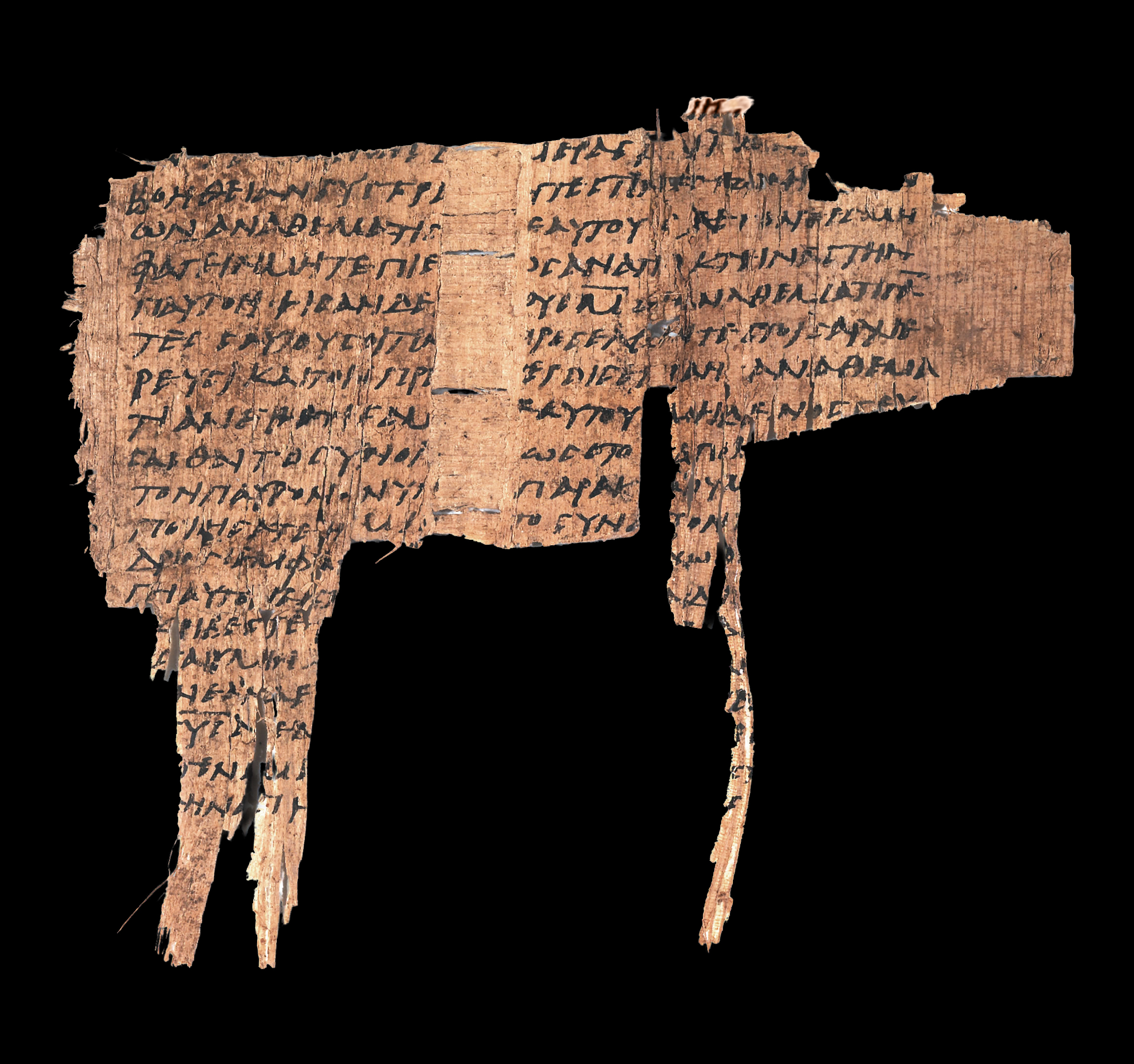
- Acts 23:11–17 in Papyrus 48, written about AD 250.
- Book: Acts of the Apostles
- Category: Church history
- Christian Bible part: New Testament
- Order in the Christian part: 5

Acts 23 is the twenty-third chapter of the Acts of the Apostles in the New Testament of the Christian Bible. It records the period of Paul's imprisonment in Jerusalem and then in Caesarea. Early Christian tradition uniformly affirmed that Luke composed this book as well as the Gospel of Luke. Critical opinion on the tradition was evenly divided at the end of the 20th century.

== Text ==
The original text was written in Koine Greek. This chapter is divided into 35 verses.

=== Textual witnesses ===
Some early manuscripts containing the text of this chapter are:

- Papyrus 48 (c. AD 250)
- Codex Vaticanus (325–350)
- Codex Sinaiticus (330–360)
- Codex Bezae (c. 400)
- Codex Alexandrinus (400–440)
- Codex Ephraemi Rescriptus (c. 450; extant verses 1–17)
- Codex Laudianus (c. 550)

== Locations ==
Three locations of Paul's detainment

The events in this chapter took place in Jerusalem, Antipatris and Caesarea.

== Paul before the Sanhedrin (verses 1–10) ==
This section continues the record of Paul's trial before the Sanhedrin from the previous chapter. The tribune ordered the Sanhedrin to meet (22:30) in an advisory capacity to help him "determine whether or not Paul had a case to answer" under the Jewish law.

=== Verse 2 ===
And the high priest Ananias commanded them that stood by him to smite him on the mouth.

- "The high priest Ananias" (verse 2; cf. 24:1) is Ananias son of Nebedaeus, who was appointed by Herod of Chalcis in AD 47, and replaced in 59 (Josephus. Antiquities. 20.103, 131, 179, 2O5).

=== Verse 5 ===
Paul replied, "Brothers, I did not realize that he was the high priest; for it is written: 'Do not speak evil about the ruler of your people'."

The quoted text is taken from Exodus 22:28:

You shall not revile God, nor curse a ruler of your people.

Paul quotes from the Jewish law to show his willingness to abide by that law.

=== Verse 8 ===
This is because Sadducees say that there's no resurrection, angel, or spirit, but Pharisees affirm them all.

Paul's account of the beliefs excluded by the Sadducees matches the issues addressed in the gospels at Matthew 22:23-33 and parallels. Both these doctrines (the resurrection of the dead, and the existence of angels and spirits) "have commonly stood or fallen together".

== Plots and counterplots (verses 11–22) ==
After the trial, Paul received 'private reassurance' that things happening to him 'are part of God's plan' (verse 11) and the first indication that "his 'witness' in Rome will not be as missionary but as prisoner". When 'the Jews' (the term used by Luke for 'those who are opposed to Paul') decide to assassinate Paul (verses 12–15), and Paul's nephew (verse 16) relays this information to Paul (and Luke), Paul receives 'a high-quality escort' to Caesarea (verses 23–24).

=== Verse 11 ===
But the following night the Lord stood by him and said,

"Be of good cheer, Paul; for as you have testified for Me in Jerusalem, so you must also bear witness at Rome."

For years Paul has the ambition to preach the gospel in Rome, the great capital of the empire (Romans 1:13; Romans 15:23), and the comforting word of Jesus ("Be of good cheer") reflects what Jesus had 'promised and foretold' in John 16:33 ("In the world ye shall have tribulation, but in me ye shall have peace").

== Paul sent to Caesarea (verses 23–30) ==
The necessity and extent of the military escort for Paul's transfer from Jerusalem to Caesarea (verses 23–24) indicate the danger on the roads at this period, which is corroborated by the historian Flavius Josephus (Josephus. Antiquities. 20.160-6, 185–8; Jewish War. 2.253-65). The tribune, Claudius Lysias, 'wrote a letter' (verse 25), telling 'the story in a way more flattering to himself' (verse 27), but 'otherwise repeats for the governor's benefit' what the readers had known.

=== Verses 23–24 ===
^{23} And he called for two centurions, saying, "Prepare two hundred soldiers, seventy horsemen, and two hundred spearmen to go to Caesarea at the third hour of the night; ^{24} and provide mounts to set Paul on, and bring him safely to Felix the governor."

- "Felix the governor" is mentioned for the first time in the book. According to historical records, Felix was 'a freedman, brother to the imperial secretary Pallas' (Josephus. Jewish War. 2.247, Antiquities. 20.137), was appointed by Claudius to be the procurator of Judea around AD 52 until 60 and generally regarded as cruel and corrupt (cf. Tacitus. Hist. 5.9), even was indicted by the Jews of Caesarea after his retirement from office (Josephus. Antiquities. 20.182) He was replaced by Festus (Josephus. Jewish War. 2.271; Antiquities. 182).

== The journey to Caesarea (23:31–35) ==
Caesarea is located about 110 kilometer from Jerusalem by road, and Antipatris (verse 31) is about half-way, 'at the point where the hill-country road intersects with the road running north from Lydda along the coastal plain'. Paul was then detained in Herod's praetorium (verse 35), where some scholars have suggested is the place the Epistle to the Philippians could have been written (cf. Philippians 1:13), as an alternative opinions to Rome as the traditional origin.

=== Verse 31 ===
Then the soldiers, as they were commanded, took Paul and brought him by night to Antipatris.

- "Antipatris", on the road from Jerusalem to Caesarea (at 26 miles distant from Caesarea), was built by Herod the Great (Herod I), who named it after his father "Antipater".

=== Verse 33 ===
When they came to Caesarea and had delivered the letter to the governor, they also presented Paul to him.

- "Presented": from Greek: πάρεστησαν, parestēsan, is a word 'particularly used of setting any one before a judge' (cf. Romans 14:10, and the subscription of 2 Timothy).

== See also ==
- Ananias son of Nedebeus
- Antipatris
- Antonius Felix
- Caesarea
- Cilicia
- Claudius Lysias
- Jerusalem
- Paul the Apostle
- Sanhedrin
- Acts 21, Acts 22, and Acts 29

== Sources ==
- Alexander, Loveday (2007). "62. Acts". In Barton, John; Muddiman, John (eds.). The Oxford Bible Commentary (first (paperback) ed.). Oxford University Press. pp. 1028–1061. ISBN 978-0199277186.
