= Ananias son of Nedebeus =

1st century AD High Priest of Israel

Ananias son of Nedebeus (Hebrew: חנניה בן נדבאי Ḥananyá ben Nadváy "…(son of) the philanthropist") was a high priest who according to the Acts of the Apostles presided during the trials of the apostle Paul at Jerusalem (Acts 23:2) and Caesarea (Acts 24:1). Josephus calls him "Ananias ben Nebedeus". He officiated as high priest from about 47 to 58.

Quadratus, governor of Syria, accused Ananias of being responsible for acts of violence. Ananias was sent to Rome for trial in 52 but was acquitted by the emperor Claudius. He continued to officiate as high priest until 58. Being a friend of the Romans, Ananias was murdered by the people at the beginning of the First Jewish-Roman War. His son Eliezar ben Hanania was one of the leaders of the Great Revolt of Judea.

== New Testament account ==
In the narrative of the Acts of the Apostles, Paul was called to appear before the Jewish Sanhedrin on the instructions of the commander of the Roman garrison in Jerusalem. Ananias heard Paul's opening defense and commanded those who stood by him "to strike him on the mouth". Paul describes him as a "whitewashed wall" (Greek: τοιχε κεκονιαμενε) and testifies that God would strike Ananias for this unlawful command. Those who stood by asked if Paul was reviling or insulting the high priest, and Paul replied that he did not know that the command to strike him had been spoken by the high priest. Seeing that there were both Pharisees and Sadducees on the Sanhedrin (see Acts 23:4–9 for the whole context):

But when Paul perceived that one part were Sadducees and the other Pharisees, he cried out in the council, "Men and brethren, I am a Pharisee, the son of a Pharisee; concerning the hope and resurrection of the dead I am being judged!" (Acts 23:6, NKJV)

P.C. Barker comments "It is not evident how it was that Paul failed to know the thing that he said he did not know—whether this were that Ananias was the high priest, or whether it were that it was Ananias who uttered the command to smite him on the mouth". Theologian John Gill identifies Joshua ben Gamla as the high priest during the trial, for one possible explanation of Paul's remark.

== See also ==
- List of biblical figures identified in extra-biblical sources

Jewish titles
Preceded by Josephus ben Camydus	High Priest of Israel; 46—52	Succeeded by Jonathan
