= Porcius Festus =

Roman procurator of Judea, c. 59 to 62

Porcius Festus was the 5th procurator of Judea from about 59 to 62, succeeding Antonius Felix.

== Term in office ==
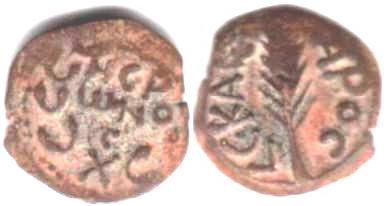
Bronze prutah minted by Festus. Obverse: Greek letters NEP WNO C (Nero) in wreath tied at the bottom with an X. Reverse: Greek letters KAICAPOC (Caesar) and date LE (year 5 = 58/59 A.D), palm branch

The exact time of Festus in office is not known. The earliest proposed date for the start of his term is c. 55 – c. 56, while the latest is 61. These extremes have not gained much support and most scholars opt for a date between 58 and 60. F. F. Bruce says that, "The date of his [Felix's] recall and replacement by Porcius Festus is disputed, but a change in the provincial coinage of Judaea attested for Nero's fifth year points to A.D. 59". Conybeare and Howson lay out an extended argument for the replacement taking place in 60.

== Administration ==
Festus inherited the problems of his predecessor in regard to the Roman practice of creating civic privileges for Jews. Another issue that bedeviled his administration was the controversy between Herod Agrippa II and the priests in Jerusalem regarding the wall erected at the temple to break the view of the new wing of Agrippa's palace.

During his administration, Jewish hostility to Rome was greatly inflamed by the civic privileges issue. Feelings were aroused which played an important part in the closely following First Jewish-Roman War of AD 66.

== Biblical narrative ==
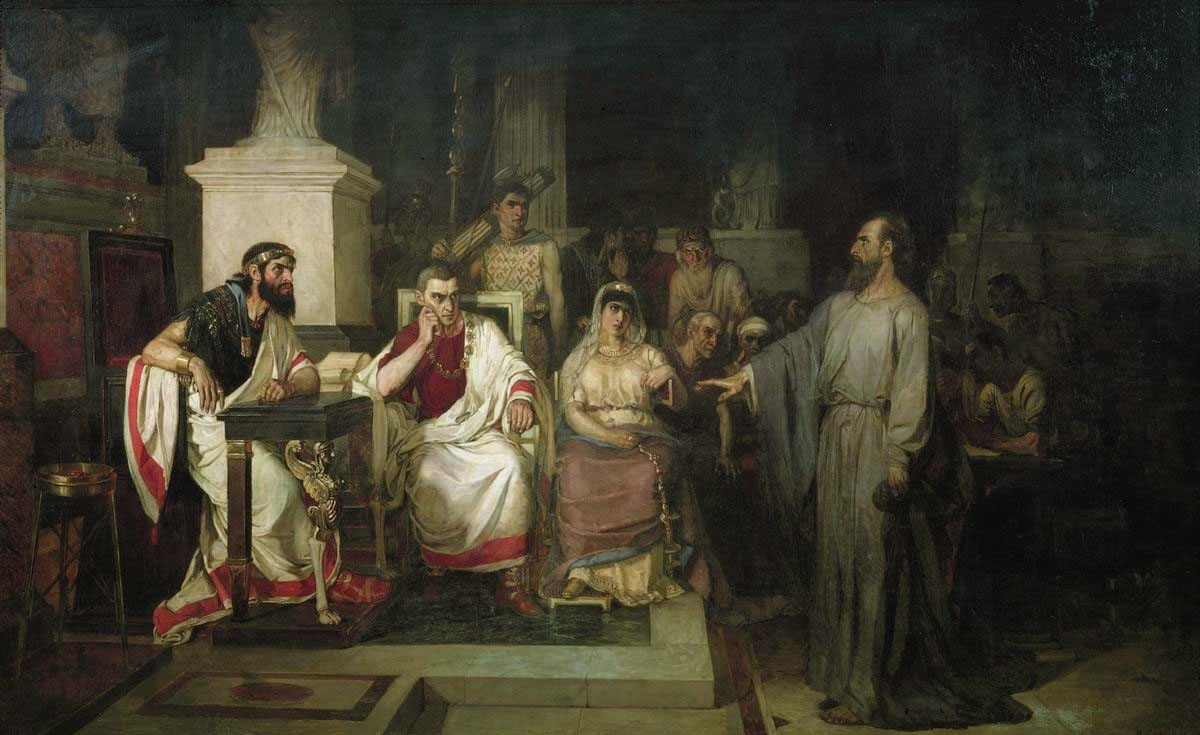
Vasily Surikov: The Apostle Paul explains the tenets of faith in the presence of King Herod Agrippa II, his sister Berenice, and the proconsul Festus (1875, State Tretyakov Gallery, Moscow)

The Acts of the Apostles narrates that Paul of Tarsus had his final hearing before Festus (Acts 24:27) in Caesarea Maritima. In Acts 25:9–12, Festus sought to induce Paul to go to Jerusalem for trial; Paul appealed to the Emperor. The appeal resulted in Paul being sent to Rome for judgment by the Emperor himself although Festus had difficulty in detailing charges against him (Acts 25–26).

== See also ==
- Gens Porcia
- Prefects, Procurators, and Legates of Roman Judaea
- List of biblical figures identified in extra-biblical sources
- Roman Procurator coinage

Preceded by Antonius Felix	Procurator of Judea c. 59 to 62	Succeeded by Lucceius Albinus
