= Acts 26 =

- ← chapter 25 chapter 27 →
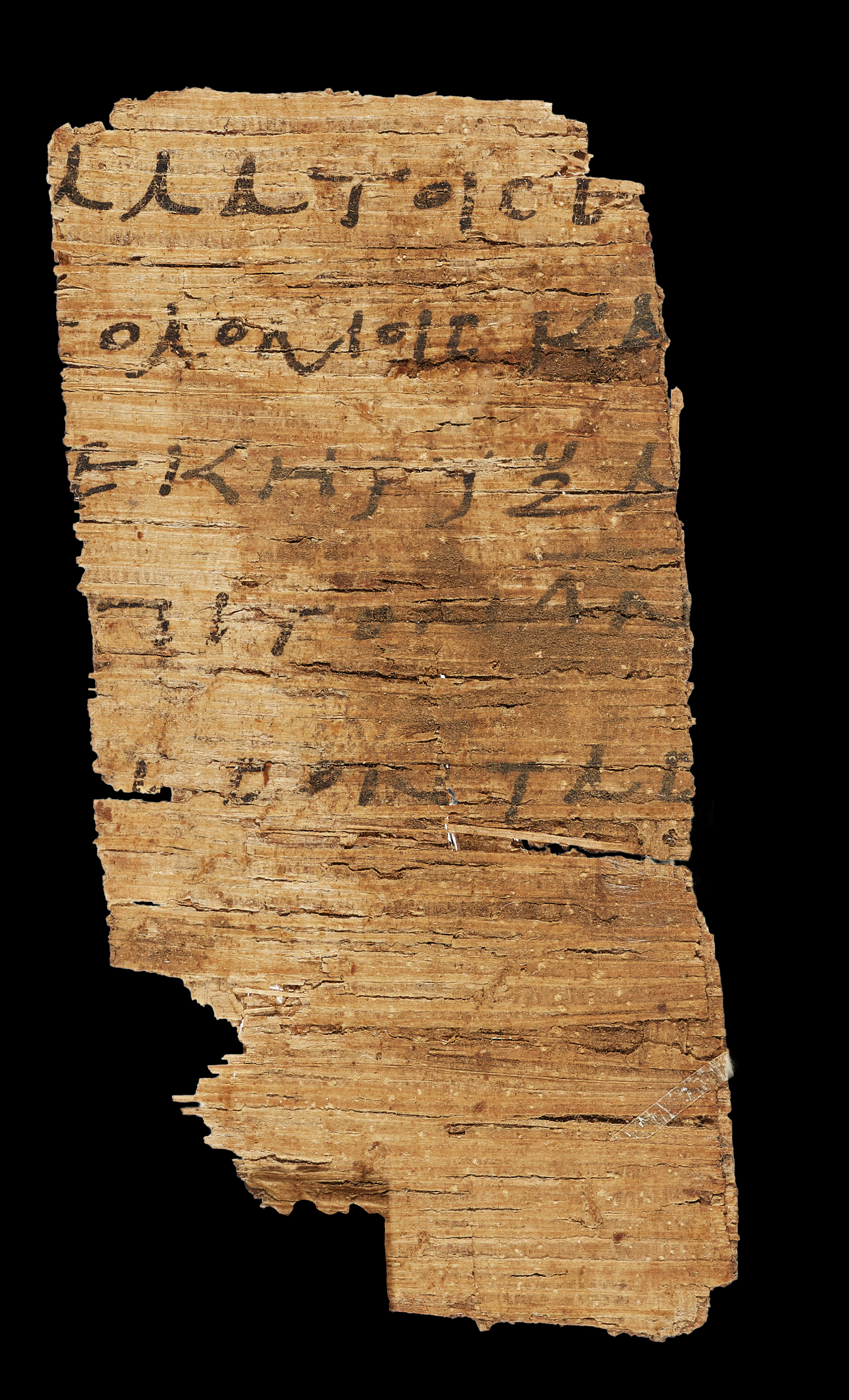
- Acts 26:20 in Greek in Papyrus 29, written in 3rd century.
- Book: Acts of the Apostles
- Category: Church history
- Christian Bible part: New Testament
- Order in the Christian part: 5

Acts 26 is the twenty-sixth chapter of the Acts of the Apostles in the New Testament of the Christian Bible. It records the period of Paul's imprisonment in Caesarea. Critical opinion on the traditional attribution to Luke the Evangelist was evenly divided at the end of the 20th century. Holman states that "uniform Christian tradition affirms that Luke wrote both" this book as well as the Gospel of Luke, as supported by Guthrie based on external evidence.

== Text ==
The original text was written in Koine Greek. This chapter is divided into 32 verses.

=== Textual witnesses ===
Some early manuscripts containing the text of this chapter are:

- Papyrus 29 (3rd century; extant verses 7–8, 20)
- Codex Vaticanus (325–350)
- Codex Sinaiticus (330–360)
- Codex Bezae (c. 400)
- Codex Alexandrinus (400–440)
- Codex Ephraemi Rescriptus (~450; extant verses 1–18)
- Codex Laudianus (~550; extant verses 1–28)

== Location ==
Location of Caesarea (with Jerusalem as reference)

The events in this chapter took place in Caesarea.

== Theme ==
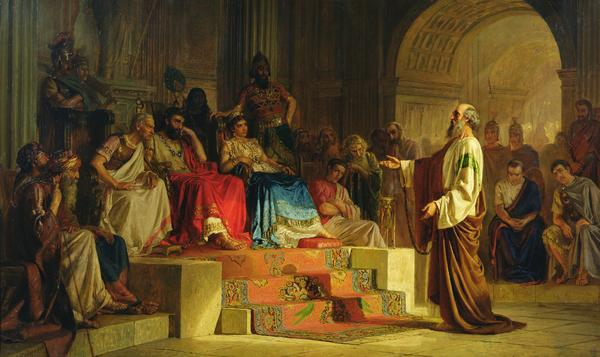
Apostle Paul On Trial by Nikolai Bodarevsky, 1875. Agrippa and Berenice are both seated on thrones.

Paul took up the invitation to speak: "Agrippa said to Paul, “You are permitted to speak for yourself" (Acts 26:1) with an account of his early life, conversion and faith. Luke presents two contrasting responses:

- Governor Festus said, "You are beside yourself! Much learning is driving you mad!” (Acts 26:24)
- King Agrippa said, "You almost persuade me to become a Christian.” (Acts 26:28)

== Paul's speech before Agrippa II and Bernice (verses 1-23) ==
Alexander divides Paul's speech into two parts: verses 1-11 are an account of his "former life", and verses 12-23 cover the heavenly vision he experienced, which has already been recorded in Acts 9:1-18 and Acts 22:6-16.

Following the custom of the first century, Paul's speech begins with "a standard captatio benevolentiae" congratulating Agrippa on his expert ability to judge the case (verses 2-3), followed by a reprise of his own life-story, focusing on Judaism (cf. Galatians 1:13-14), with the emphasis on Jerusalem, in his Pharisaic background (verses 4-5; cf. Acts 23:6, Philippians 3:5-6), his persecution of the Christians (verses 9-11; cf. Galatians 1:13; Philippians 3:6; 1 Corinthians 15:9) and his conversion to be the follower of Christ. Paul's conversion story is repeated: Alexander suggests that the functional redundancy of the passage is an indicator of its rhetorical importance, with slight variations and the significant addition of 'in the Hebrew language' (verse 14) showing that this time it is addressed to a Greek-speaking audience (whereas previously it was in 'Hebrew', or Aramaic; Acts 21:40). An expansion what is said by the heavenly voice here includes a proverbial saying: "It hurts you to kick against the goads", which is not found in either Acts 9:4 or 22:7, but parallels Greek writings (cf. esp. Euripides. The Bacchae, 794–5).

== Paul's challenge to Agrippa (verses 24-32) ==
The speech was brought to closure with a 'lively piece of dialogue' which contrasts between "madness" (verse 24) and "sober truth" (verse 25), turning into a direct challenge to Agrippa, verses 26–29). The end of the speech clearly displays the real object of Paul's persuasive rhetoric: 'not exoneration but conversion', so 'all who are listening' to Paul (verse 29) are invited to 'become a Christian' (verse 28), but nonetheless it results in the reinforcement of his innocence as both Festus and Agrippa were convinced that Paul has committed no crime (verses 31–22).

=== Verse 24 ===
At this point Festus interrupted Paul's defense. "You are out of your mind, Paul!" he shouted. "Your great learning is driving you insane."

The phrase τὰ πολλά σε γράμματα is translated here as "great learning" rather than the possibly more literal "many books". Heinrich Meyer argues that if the latter had been the intention, the word βιβλία or βίβλοι would probably have been used.

=== Verse 28 ===
King James Version:

Then Agrippa said unto Paul, Almost thou persuadest me to be a Christian.

New International Version:

Then Agrippa said to Paul, "Do you think that in such a short time you can persuade me to be a Christian?"

While the first translation is the more literal, the king, a rich and secular man, is possibly speaking ironically.

Methodist founder John Wesley preached a sermon entitled "The Almost Christian", based on this verse, at St. Mary's, Oxford, on 25 July 1741. It is sermon 2 in his standard collection of sermons. Wesley's companion George Whitefield also preached a sermon with the same title referring to the same verse.

A "Christian" (Ancient Greek: Χριστιανόν, Christianon, nominative: Christianos): this is the second mention of the term in the New Testament. The first use was in Antioch (Acts 11:26), where the writer of Acts refers to the novelty of the term, and the term is also used by Peter in 1 Peter 4:16: If anyone suffers as a Christian .... All three usages are considered to reflect a derisive element referring to the followers of Christ who did not acknowledge the emperor of Rome.

== See also ==
- Bernice
- Acts 9, Acts 22, Acts 25, and Acts 27

== Sources ==
- Alexander, Loveday (2007). "62. Acts". In Barton, John; Muddiman, John (eds.). The Oxford Bible Commentary (first (paperback) ed.). Oxford University Press. pp. 1028–1061. ISBN 978-0199277186.
- Wuest, Kenneth Samuel (1973). Wuest's word studies from the Greek New Testament. Vol. 1. ISBN 978-0-8028-2280-2.
