= Claudius Lysias =

New Testament figure

Claudius Lysias is a figure mentioned in the New Testament book of the Acts of the Apostles. According to Acts 21:31–24:22, Lysias was a Roman tribune and the commander (chiliarch) of the Roman garrison ("cohort", Acts 21:31) in Jerusalem.

== Claudius Lysias, the tribune ==
Claudius Lysias is called "the tribune" (in Greek χιλίαρχος, chiliarch) 16 times within Acts 21-24 (21.31-33, 37; 22.24, 26–29; 23.10, 15, 17, 19, 22; 24.22).

The Greek term χιλίαρχος is said to be used to translate the Roman tribunus militum (following Polybius), and also for the phrase tribuni militares consulari potestate (Plutarch). The responsibilities of a χιλίαρχος were as a "commander of a thousand men". Essentially, Claudius Lysias is "a high-ranking military officer in charge" of anywhere from 600 to 1,000 men, and this appears to be the case for it is said that his command was over a "cohort" (σπεῖρα, speira) in Jerusalem which is "the tenth part of a Roman legion having about 600 men" (Acts 21:31).

== Tribune of a Jerusalem cohort ==
Claudius Lysias' complete description as found in the New Testament book of the Acts of the Apostles is "the tribune of the cohort" in Jerusalem, which resided in nearby "barracks" (Acts 21.34, 37; 22.24, 23.10, 16, 32). It takes ten cohorts to make up a legion, and each legion had six tribunes with a thousand men ("soldiers and centurions" Acts 21:32) under his command if the cohort was full; consequently, Claudius Lysias was a part of a larger military force. The exact numbers in his cohort may never be known, however he had sufficient men to spare two centurions, two hundred soldiers, seventy horsemen, and two hundred spearmen to accompany Paul to Caesarea Acts 23:23–24. Furthermore, when the security detail arrives before Antipatris (Acts 23:31), Claudius Lysias allows for the seventy horsemen to go on with him and Paul to Caesarea, the headquarters of the Procurator Felix (Acts 23:32–35).

The "barracks" referenced in the book of Acts (21.34, 37; 22.24; 23.10, 16, 32), in connection to Claudius Lysias and his cohort are references to the Tower of Antonia, which Herod the Great rebuilt from a previous structure and named it after Marc Antony. The Antonia was added on to the NW side of the Temple facilities, "from which stairs descend into the outer court of the temple" (Acts 21.32, 35, 22.30). For this reason, the Roman Tribune could hear the commotion caused by the confusing riot over Paul's presence in the Temple, and respond with speed (Acts 21.27-32).

== Claudius Lysias in the New Testament ==
The military tribune Claudius Lysias enters the New Testament narrative when he protects Paul of Tarsus from a hostile Jewish mob on the outside of the Temple grounds in Jerusalem (Acts 21.30-32). The Acts text does not explicitly state why the tribune arrests Paul aside from asking "who he was and what he had done" (Acts 21.33); consequently, it appears Paul is detained for investigation as reflected later in Paul's interrogation in the Antonian barracks because he was a cause of instigation among the Jews (Acts 22.23-24).

Claudius Lysias is aware of Jewish anarchistic movements, for when Paul speaking in Greek asks permission to speak to the shouting Jewish mob, the tribune appears shocked that he speaks Greek (Acts 21.37). Paul, as a controversial Greek-speaking Hebrew, evidently met some of the criteria for Lysias to conclude he was a Jewish revolutionist. Consequently, it appears that Lysias suspects him of being "the Egyptian" who "stirred up a revolt and led the four thousand men of the Assassins [σικαρίων] out into the wilderness" (Acts 21:38). This individual operated around A.D. 53, and this revolution amounted to amassing these four thousand men, positioning themselves upon the Mount of Olives outside Jerusalem and anticipated the walls of Jerusalem to collapse at his command. The Romans attacked this band of men, the Egyptian lost six hundred men, fled into the wilderness where he disappears awaiting "further revelation". Evidently, "the Egyptian" was still on the run, wanted by the Roman military and the tribune was going to see if Paul was this anarchist.

Paul was able to persuade Lysias that he was not an agitator, and provides him with his provincial citizenship as being from Tarsus, in the province of Cilicia (Acts 21.39). This was not an "obscure city" and either this suggests his citizenship could be authenticated, or Paul distinguished himself from the obscure Egyptian. In either case, Paul's point is clear, he is not the Egyptian; the tribune accepts Paul's case, and grants Paul an opportunity to speak to the Jews on the steps of the Temple facilities adjoined to the Antonian fortress (Acts 21.39-40). The Jews did not respond peaceably to Paul's speech, and Claudius Lysias decides to take Paul into the "barracks" of Antonia and "examine" him through the process of binding him to flog him (Acts 22.22-24). On receiving a report that Paul was a Roman citizen and then making personal inquiry, Claudius is afraid of having violated the rights of a Roman by having him bound (see "Roman Citizenship" below). Claudius desires to arrive at the truth concerning the Jewish case against Paul, and commands the Sanhedrin to assemble. Dissension among the Sanhedrin towards Paul arises again, and causes Claudius Lysias to order his men to take Paul to the safety of the Antonian barracks (Acts 22.30-23.10).

Upon learning of a plot to kill Paul, Claudius Lysias summoned two of his army officers and commanded them to get ready 200 soldiers, 70 horsemen, and 200 spearmen to leave for Caesarea Maritima. In compliance with Roman law, he also sent a statement of the case to the procurator Antonius Felix. The letter reads:

Claudius Lysias, to his Excellency the governor Felix, greetings.

This man was seized by the Jews and was about to be killed by them when I came upon them with the soldiers and rescued him, having learned that he was a Roman citizen. And desiring to know the charge for which they were accusing him, I brought him down to their council. I found that he was being accused about questions of their law, but charged with nothing deserving death or imprisonment.

And when it was disclosed to me that there would be a plot against the man, I sent him to you at once, ordering his accusers also to state before you what they have against him. (Acts 23.26-30 English Standard Version)

The letter format is consistent with the general format in the Graeco-Roman world, of "author" to "recipient" with a "greeting" with the subsequent content of the reason for the letter. This letter, however, was not altogether factual. It "is an interesting specimen of Roman military correspondence" (Acts 23:26–30). Although acknowledging Paul's innocence, Claudius Lysias gave the impression that he had rescued Paul because of having learned that the apostle was a Roman, whereas in reality he had violated Paul's citizenship rights by having him bound and even ordering that he be examined under scourgings. As to the disciple Luke's knowledge of the letter's contents, it may be that the letter itself was read at the time Paul's case was heard.

The Center for the Study of New Testament Manuscripts houses digital photographs of Bezae NT 1588 which displays the purported text of Claudius Lysias' letter to Felix.

Claudius Lysias obtained his Roman citizenship by purchase, and was therefore probably a Greek. (Acts 22:28).

== Roman citizenship ==
In Acts 22:23–29, a discussion between Paul and Claudius emerges on the topic of Roman citizenship. Part of Claudius' investigation procedure to find out more information was to stretch out the detained for whips and flog them.

Before his flogging begins, Paul questions the centurion given this detail, "Is it lawful for you to flog a man who is a Roman citizen and uncondemned?" (Acts 22.25). Roman citizenship had a number of privileges, as John Polhill writes:

A Roman citizen was subject to Roman law and thus was protected from such things as being beaten without a trial, from cruel punishments like crucifixion, and from unlawful imprisonment, rights which did not belong to an ordinary provincial (peregrinus). Citizens had the right of appeal. Only a Roman citizen could legally marry another Roman citizen. Citizens were exempted from certain taxes. Beyond this, there was the considerable factor of honor and deference such a status afforded.

It was such a valued honor, that some people risked the death penalty given for falsely claiming citizenship. One could hold dual citizenship, as Paul was not only a citizen of the city of Rome, but he was also a citizen of the city of Tarsus from the province of Cilicia (Acts 21.39; 23.34).

Roman citizenship was conferred in a number of ways. (1) The most common way was being born from two Roman citizens. This is the claim Paul makes when asked how he obtained his citizenship ("I am a citizen by birth" Acts 22.28), which implies that both of Paul's parents were Jewish Roman citizens (cf. #4). (2) One could obtain citizenship as a reward for military service. Regularly, military veterans were given citizenship upon discharge. This was the surest way to get it, taking 20 to 25 years depending on the level of rank. (3) Imperial conference, though heard of, was not entirely common. Nevertheless, the emperor could confer citizenship, either on individuals or on whole communities, as in the establishment of a new colony. Often the result of doing some loyal service to Rome. Also, many times through these services, one gained an audience with the Emperor through expensive gifts to members of the inner Imperial court. This may have been how the Tribune Claudius Lysias gained his citizenship (Acts 22.27-28). In fact, the tribune's name provides evidence to assume the plausibility that the Emperor Claudius (A.D. 41 - A.D. 54) conferred upon Lysias citizenship since those granted this honor would bear the name (the nomen) of the family or patron which conferred it; hence, Lysias gained the name of his patron Claudius. It has been noted that the emperor was quite "promiscuous" in his conference of citizenship. (4) Roman citizenship was also conferred through emancipation of a slave from the house of a Roman citizen. Some have suggested that Paul's ancestors may have been freedmen from among the thousands of Jews whom Pompey took as slaves in 63 B.C.
