= Antonius Felix =

Roman procurator of Judaea (r. 52–60 CE)

- Antonius Felix from Guillaume Rouillé's Promptuarii Iconum Insigniorum

4th Procurator of Iudaea
- In office 52–60
- Appointed by: Claudius
- Preceded by: Ventidius Cumanus
- Succeeded by: Porcius Festus

Personal details
- Born: c. 5 – 10

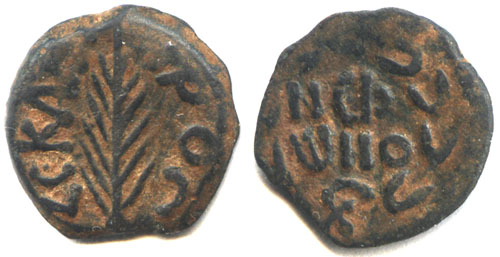
Bronze prutah minted by Antonius Felix. Obverse: Greek letters ΝΕΡ ΩΝΟ Ϲ ("of Nero") in wreath. Reverse: Greek letters ΚΑΙϹΑΡΟϹ ("Caesar") and date LC (year 3 = 56/57), palm branch.

Antonius Felix (possibly Tiberius Claudius Antonius Felix, in Greek: ὁ Φῆλιξ; born c. 5–10) was the fourth Roman procurator of Judea Province in 52–60, in succession to Ventidius Cumanus. He appears in the New Testament in Acts 23 and 24, where the Apostle Paul is brought before him for a trial.

== Life ==
Felix was the younger brother of Greek freedman Marcus Antonius Pallas who served as a secretary of the treasury during the reign of Emperor Claudius. According to Tacitus, Pallas and Felix descended from the Greek Kings of Arcadia.

== Procurator of Judaea ==
Schematic family tree showing the relationship between Felix and the Herodian Dynasty and its appearance in the New Testament

Felix became the procurator by the petition of his brother. Felix's cruelty and his accessibility to bribes (see Book of Acts 24:26) led to a great increase of crime in Judaea. The period of his rule was marked by internal feuds and disturbances, which he put down with severity.

In 58, Felix hired assassins to murder the (former) High Priest Jonathan. Jonathan had often criticized Felix about governing Jewish affairs, and he threatened to report to Caesar if Felix did not do well. Felix persuaded Doras, one of Jonathan's most trusted friends and a citizen of Jerusalem, to hire robbers to kill Jonathan by promising to give him a large sum of money. Doras arranged for some hired men to mingle with the worshippers in the Temple in Jerusalem with daggers hidden under their garments. These assassins killed Jonathan during a Jewish festival and were never caught.

The Apostle Paul was arrested in Jerusalem and rescued from a plot against his life, and Claudius Lysias transferred him to Caesarea, where he stood trial before Felix. Felix and his wife Drusilla heard Paul's discourse and sent for him to talk with him. However, Felix's actual desire was to receive a bribe from Paul, which Paul refused to do (Acts 24:24–26). Felix was succeeded as procurator after detaining Paul for two years, but he left him imprisoned as a favor to the Jews (Acts 24:27).

Upon returning to Rome, Felix was accused of using a dispute between the Jews and the Syrians of Caesarea as a pretext to slay and plunder the inhabitants, but he escaped unpunished through the intercession of his brother Pallas, who had great influence with Emperor Nero.

Porcius Festus succeeded him as procurator of Judea.

== Marriages and family ==
Felix married three times. His first wife was Drusilla of Mauretania, probably the daughter of Ptolemy of Mauretania and Julia Urania. Felix's second wife was the Judean Drusilla of Judea, daughter of Herod Agrippa I and Cypros. Drusilla of Judea divorced Gaius Julius Azizus, King of Emesa to marry Felix. The couple had a son, Marcus Antonius Agrippa, who died, along with many of the inhabitants of Pompeii and Herculaneum, in the eruption of Mount Vesuvius on 24 August 79. Antonia Agrippina (whose name was found in graffiti in a Royal Tomb in Egypt) may have been a granddaughter from Agrippa. His third wife's name is not attested. A man named Lucius Anneius Domitius Proculus is described in an inscription as the great-grandson of Felix, his grandmother is named as Antonia Clementiana, presumably Felix's daughter. Another inscription names a Tiberius Claudius (with a missing cognomen) who was in some way associated with a Titus Mucius Clemens.

Marcus Antonius Fronto Salvianus (a quaestor) and his son Marcus Antonius Felix Magnus (a high priest in 225) are possible descendants as well.

== See also ==
- Prefects, Procurators, and Legates of Roman Judaea
- List of biblical figures identified in extra-biblical sources
- Roman Procurator coinage

Preceded by Ventidius Cumanus	Procurator of Judea; 52 to 58	Succeeded by Porcius Festus
