= Drusilla =

- Gender: Female

Origin
- Origin: Drosos
- Meaning: Dew
- Region of origin: Roman Empire

Other names
- Alternative spelling: Drucilla

Drusilla is a female given name.

== History ==
The name has its origin from the Latin cognomen (and later praenomen) Drusus which itself derived from the Greek drosos (dew). The diminutive "illa" transforms the name into feminine form. The most notable ancient Roman women bearing the name were members of the Julio-Claudian dynasty, empress Livia Drusilla (wife of emperor Augustus), princesses Julia Drusilla the Elder (sister of emperor Caligula) and Julia Drusilla the Younger (daughter of Caligula). Women such as the Herodian princess Drusilla and Mauretanian princess Drusilla were named in their honor, thus spreading the name across the Roman Empire. As a name appearing in the Bible it was adopted by English speakers in the 17th century. The name has never been very popular in the United States where, according to Social Security Administration records, from 1880 to 1914 its highest ranking of girls' names was 612 out of 1,000 in 1886.

== People ==
- Drusilla Beyfus (1927–2026), English journalist and etiquette writer
- Drucilla Roberts Bickford (1925–2024), American politician
- Drusilla Modjeska (born 1946), Australian writer and editor
- Drusilla Wills (1884–1951), British stage and film actress
- Drusilla Wilson (1815–1908), American temperance leader and Quaker pastor

== Fictional characters ==
- Drusilla, aka Wonder Girl, Wonder Woman's sister in the TV series Wonder Woman
- Drusilla (Buffy the Vampire Slayer), in the TV series and its spin-off Angel
- Drusilla Paddock, in The Worst Witch children's novel series
- Drusilla Foer, Italian entertainer played by Gianluca Gori
- Drusilla Blackthorn, from Cassandra Clare's trilogy The Dark Artifices
- Drusilla, a succubus in the webcomic Pibgorn
- Drusilla, the mysterious co-host of EC Comic's The Vault of Horror
- Drusilla Clack, a hypocritical Evangelist in Wilkie Collins's novel The Moonstone
- Drusilla Sartoris, in William Faulkner's novel The Unvanquished
- Drusilla Arbuckle, character from The Garfield Show
- Drusilla Lamb, played by Gillian Lewis in the 1960s television series Mr. Rose.
- Drusilla Sickle, the Escort for District 12 in Suzanne Collins' novel Sunrise on the Reaping.

== See also ==
- Drizella Tremaine, a character in Disney's 1950 film Cinderella
