= Acts 22 =

- ← chapter 21 chapter 23 →
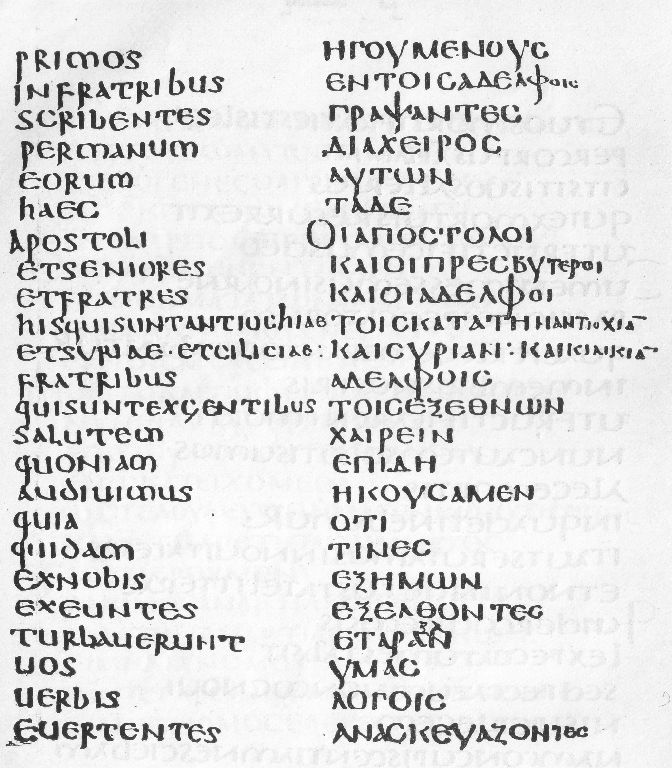
- Acts 15:22–24 in Latin (left column) and Greek (right column) in Codex Laudianus, written about AD 550.
- Book: Acts of the Apostles
- Category: Church history
- Christian Bible part: New Testament
- Order in the Christian part: 5

Acts 22 is the twenty-second chapter of the Acts of the Apostles in the New Testament of the Christian Bible. It records the events leading to Paul's imprisonment in Jerusalem. Early Christian tradition uniformly affirmed that Luke composed this book as well as the Gospel of Luke. Critical opinion on the tradition was evenly divided at the end of the 20th century.

== Text ==
The original text was written in Koine Greek. This chapter is divided into 30 verses.

=== Textual witnesses ===
Some early manuscripts containing the text of this chapter are:

- Codex Vaticanus (AD 325–350)
- Codex Sinaiticus (330–360)
- Codex Bezae (~400)
- Codex Alexandrinus (400–440)
- Codex Ephraemi Rescriptus (~450; extant verses 21–30)
- Codex Laudianus (~550)

== Locations ==
Places mentioned in (blue) and related to (black) this chapter.

The events in this chapter took place in Jerusalem. Some other places are also mentioned in this chapter:

- Cilicia
- Damascus
- Nazareth
- Tarsus

== Paul's speech in the Temple (verses 1–21) ==
This part contains the first in a series of Paul's apologetic speeches (verse 1: "... to you now in [my] defence", Greek: προς υμας νυνι απολογιας, pros humas nuni apologias). Paul's opening words use the language and address designed to stress a commonalty with his audience (verses 1–2), and to emphasize that he, like them, is a 'zealot for God' (verse 3) with a 'strict seminary education rooted in Jerusalem'; both are consistent with Paul's own claims about his education in Galatians 1:13–14.

=== Verse 1 ===
Men, brethren, and fathers, hear ye my defence which I make now unto you.

The address to "men, brethren, and fathers" matches the opening words used by Stephen in his address to the Sanhedrin in Acts 7:2.

=== Verse 3 ===
[Paul said:] "I am indeed a Jew, born in Tarsus of Cilicia, but brought up in this city at the feet of Gamaliel, taught according to the strictness of our fathers’ law, and was zealous toward God as you all are today."

- "This city": refers to Jerusalem. An alternative argument, that "this city" refers to Tarsus, does not match Paul's argument here.

=== Verse 8 ===
[Paul said:] "So I answered, 'Who are You, Lord?' And He said to me, 'I am Jesus of Nazareth, whom you are persecuting.'"

The detailed record of Paul's conversion story here indicates that this account is important for Luke, even with some differences from the record in chapter 9, thus shedding 'an interesting light on Luke's practice as a narrator', who 'sees no difficulty in the fact that the retold story is slightly different each time'. The story is further repeated in Acts 26.

=== Verse 12 ===
[Paul said:] "Then a certain Ananias, a devout man according to the law, having a good testimony with all the Jews who dwelt there,"

- "Ananias": is given a little more background detail by Paul compared to the previous account in chapter 9, which is "relevant to his claim to be working within a framework of observant Judaism".

=== Verse 16 ===
[Paul retold that Ananias said to him:] "And now why are you waiting? Arise and be baptized, and wash away your sins, calling on the name of the Lord."

- "Be baptized": In chapter 9, the significance of baptism was only alluded to briefly, without explanation, but here it is made explicit: 'it is to do with cleansing from sin, and calling on the name of Christ'.

=== Verses 17–18 ===
[Paul said:]"^{17}Now it happened, when I returned to Jerusalem and was praying in the temple, that I was in a trance ^{18}and saw Him saying to me, 'Make haste and get out of Jerusalem quickly, for they will not receive your testimony concerning Me.'""

- "I returned to Jerusalem": likely refers to the visit of Acts 9:26, and Galatians 1:18.

== Paul the Roman (verses 22–29) ==
When Paul mentioned the Gentiles, the audience was again stirred up and behaving riotous (verses 22–23), so the tribune decides to remove Paul for further interrogation in the barracks, that is 'the examination of witnesses by torture' (verse 24), which was a routine practice in both Greek and Roman judicial systems. At the last moment, Paul reveals a little more of his citizenship status (verse 25) that 'produces consternation and dismay among the soldiers and minor officials into whose hands he has fallen' (verses 26–29).

=== Verse 28 ===
The commander answered, "With a large sum I obtained this citizenship."

And Paul said, "But I was born a citizen."

The claim of Paul to be 'free-born' here means that his citizenship status 'goes back at least to his father's generation, possibly earlier, to the period of the civil wars, when Roman generals granted citizenship to a number of individuals and associations in the Greek East who had supported their cause'. The citizenship status of the tribune (whose name is Claudius Lysias; cf. Acts 23:26) corresponds to the record of 'the growing laxity of citizenship grants, which were widely reported to be freely available for money' during the reign of Claudius Caesar (Dio Cassius, 60. 17.5–6).

== Paul to be brought before the Sanhedrin (verse 30) ==
The tribune 'ordered' the Sanhedrin to meet, although only in an advisory capacity, to 'help him determine whether or not Paul had a case to answer in Jewish law'.

== See also ==
- Ananias of Damascus
- Cilicia
- Damascus
- Gamaliel
- Jesus of Nazareth
- Paul the Apostle
- Stephen
- Tarsus
- Acts 5, Acts 7, Acts 8, Acts 9, Acts 20, Acts 21, Acts 26, and Acts 28

== Sources ==
- Alexander, Loveday (2007). "62. Acts". In Barton, John; Muddiman, John (eds.). The Oxford Bible Commentary (first (paperback) ed.). Oxford University Press. pp. 1028–1061. ISBN 978-0199277186.
