= Procurator (ancient Rome) =

Administrative title in the Roman Empire

Procurator (plural: Procuratores) was a title of certain officials (not magistrates) in ancient Rome who were in charge of the financial affairs of a province, or imperial governor of a minor province.

== Fiscal officers ==
A fiscal procurator (procurator Augusti) was the chief financial officer of a province during the Principate (30 BC – AD 284). A fiscal procurator worked alongside the legatus Augusti pro praetore (imperial governor) of his province but was not subordinate to him, reporting directly to the emperor. The governor headed the civil and judicial administration of the province and was the commander-in-chief of all military units deployed there. The procurator, with his own staff and agents, was in charge of the province's financial affairs, including the following primary responsibilities:

- the collection of taxes, especially the land tax (tributum soli), poll tax (tributum capitis), and the portorium, an imperial duty on the carriage of goods on public highways
- collection of rents on land belonging to imperial estates
- management of mines
- the distribution of pay to public servants (mostly in the military)

The office of fiscal procurator was always held by an equestrian, unlike the office of governor, which was reserved for members of the higher senatorial order. The reason for the dual administrative structure was to prevent excessive concentration of power in the hands of the governor, as well as to limit his opportunities for peculation. It was not unknown for friction to arise between governors and procurators over matters of jurisdiction and finance.

== Provincial governors ==
A procurator Augusti (often called the Praesidial Procurator, i.e., a garrison- or troop-commanding procurator), however, might also be the governor of the smaller imperial provinces (i.e., those provinces whose governor was appointed by the emperor, rather than the Roman Senate). The same title was held by the fiscal procurators, who assisted governors of the senatorial provinces, who were always senators.

In addition, procurator was the title given to various other officials in Rome and Italy.

After the mid-first century, as a result of the Pax Romana, the provinces previously governed by prefects, who were military men, were gradually moved into the hands of procurators, who were essentially civilian fiscal officials. Egypt, as the special private domain of the emperor, which was administered by a Praefectus Augustalis, remained the exception. This transfer created some confusion among scholars dealing with Pontius Pilate, governor of Judaea, who was often thought to have been a procurator, until the excavation of the inscribed so-called Pilate Stone, which proved his title was prefect.

== See also ==
- Roman governor
- Roman province
- Procurator at Rome (Catholic, canon law)
- Procurator fiscal (Scotland)

== Bibliography ==
- Mattingly, David (2006) An Imperial Possession: Britain in the Roman Empire
- Salway, Peter (2015) Roman Britain: A Very Short Introduction
