= Ananias and Sapphira =

Couple featured in the New Testament

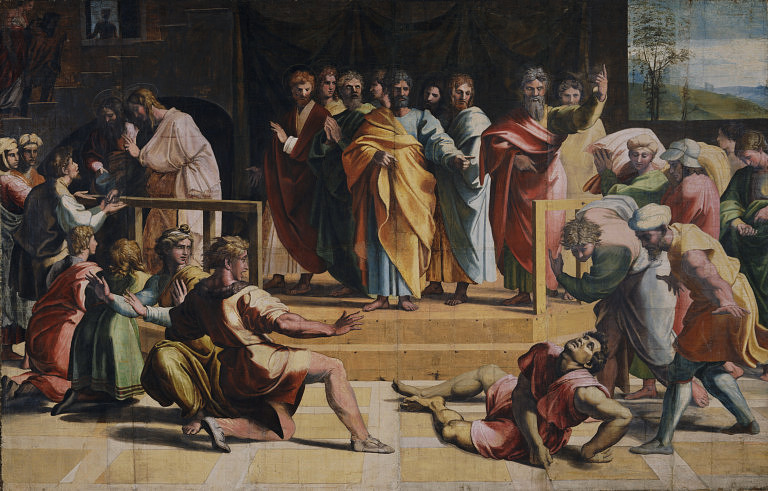
The Death of Ananias, by Raphael, 1515, Raphael Cartoons

Ananias (/ˌænəˈnaɪ.əs/; Biblical Hebrew: חָנַנְיָהּ, romanized: Chānanyah) and his wife Sapphira (/səˈfaɪrə/; סָפִירַה, Ṣafīrah) were, according to the biblical New Testament in Acts of the Apostles chapter 5, members of the early Christian church in Jerusalem. The account records their sudden deaths after lying to the Holy Spirit about money.

Their story is rarely shown in art, but is sometimes part of extended New Testament cycles. It is the subject of one of the Raphael Cartoons for the Sistine Chapel tapestries by Raphael, and a panel on the Brescia Casket, both illustrated here. It is a scene in the Brancacci Chapel frescos by Masaccio. There is also a 1590s painting by Ambrosius Francken the Elder, and other treatments.

== Story summary ==
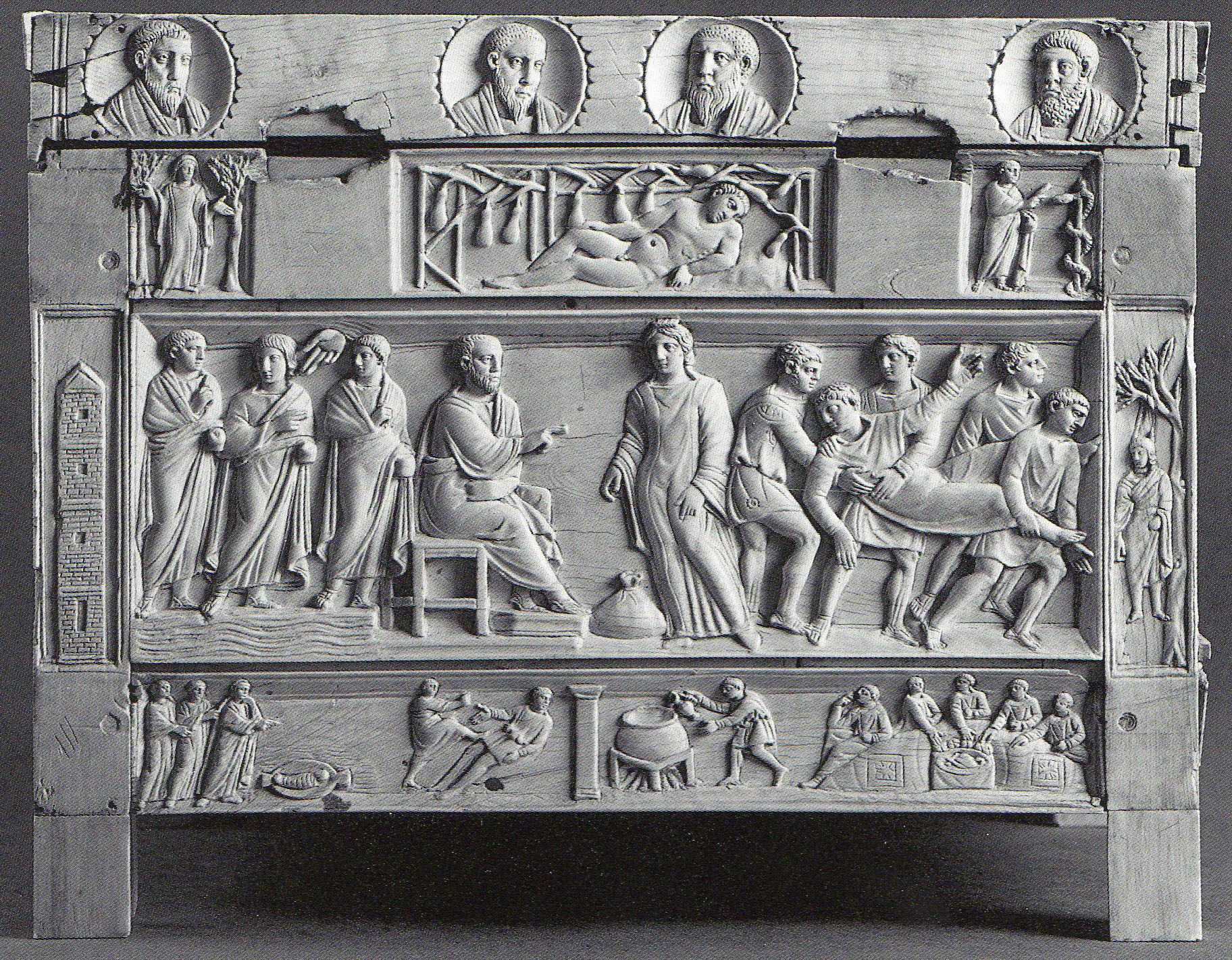
Ananias and Sapphira on the Brescia Casket, late 4th century (middle register, centre and right)

Acts chapter 4:32 closes by stating that the first followers of Jesus did not consider their possessions to be their own but rather held in common, in order to use what they had on behalf of those in want. For example, Barnabas, a Levite from Cyprus, sold a plot of land and donated the proceeds to the apostles.

As told at the beginning of Acts chapter 5, Ananias and Sapphira, following Barnabas's example, also sold their land but secretly withheld a portion of the proceeds. Ananias presented his donation to Peter. Peter replied, "Why is it that Satan has so filled your heart that you have lied to the Holy Spirit?" Peter pointed out that Ananias was in control of the money and could give or keep it as he saw fit, but had withheld a portion of it. Peter stated that Ananias had lied not to men, but to God. Because of his actions Ananias died on the spot and was carried out. Everyone who heard about the incident feared the Lord. Three hours after Ananias's death his wife arrived, unaware of what had happened. Peter asked her the price of the land that she and Ananias had sold, and she stated the same untruthful price that Ananias had given. She too fell dead.

== Patristic commentary ==
The fourth-century archbishop John Chrysostom alludes to and then dismisses the idea that Peter could be held responsible for the couple's death.

== Modern scholarship ==
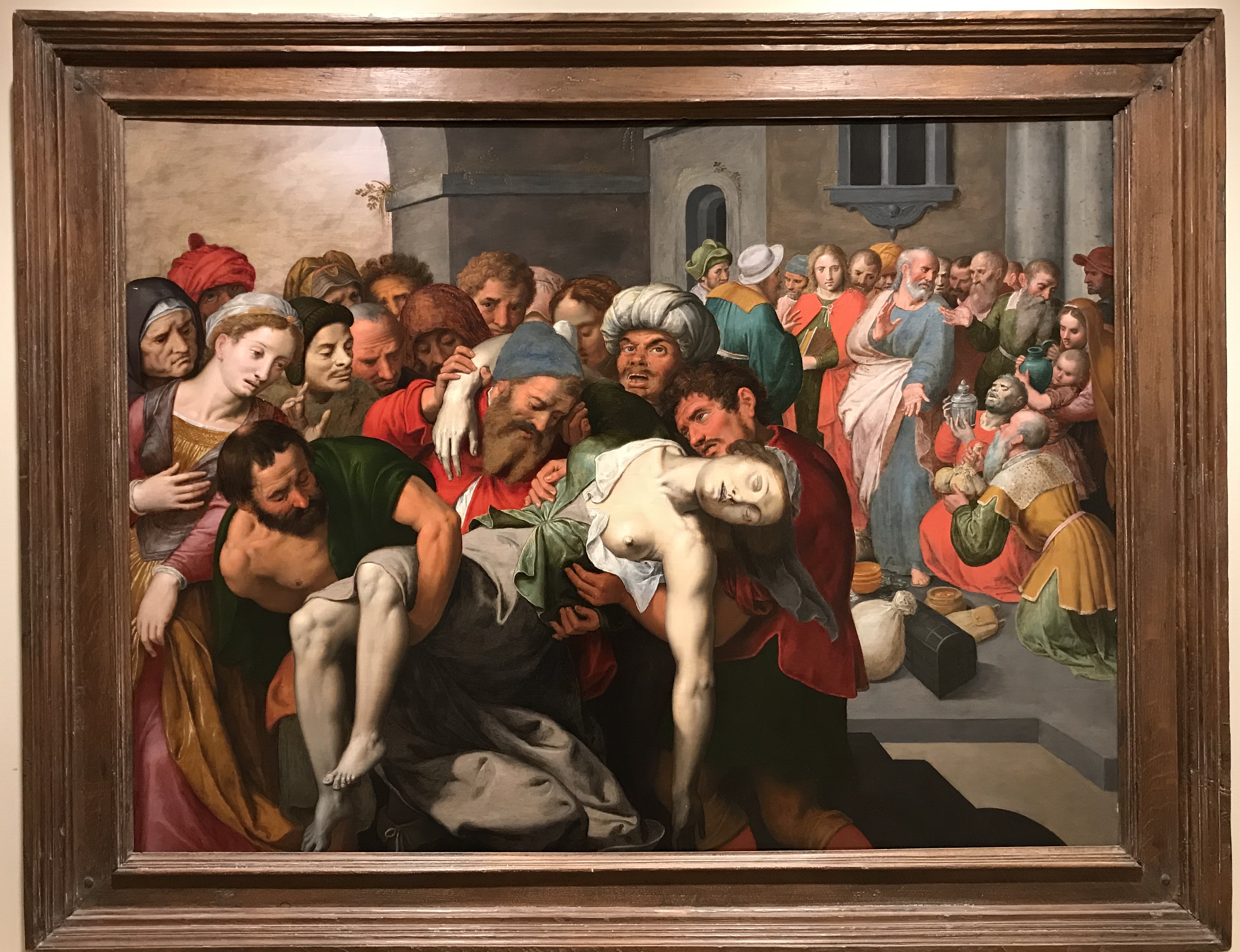
The Death of Sapphira, by Ambrosius Francken the Elder

The morality of the incident has been the source of some commentary. James Dunn describes it as "one of the most unnerving episodes in the whole of the New Testament." Scholars note parallels with the story of Achan in the biblical account in Joshua 7; Havelaar, writing in 1997, notes various parallel events in pagan literature, in particular one close parallel in an event recounted by Herodotus about a certain Glaucus who tried to tempt the gods at Delphi by lying about money he had kept dishonestly, and was subsequently deprived of descendants.

Darrell Bock concludes that the episode emphasises the seriousness of sin, as well as the graciousness of God who often defers judgment. The church is not composed of perfect people, but sins including pride and deceit will eventually be dealt with.

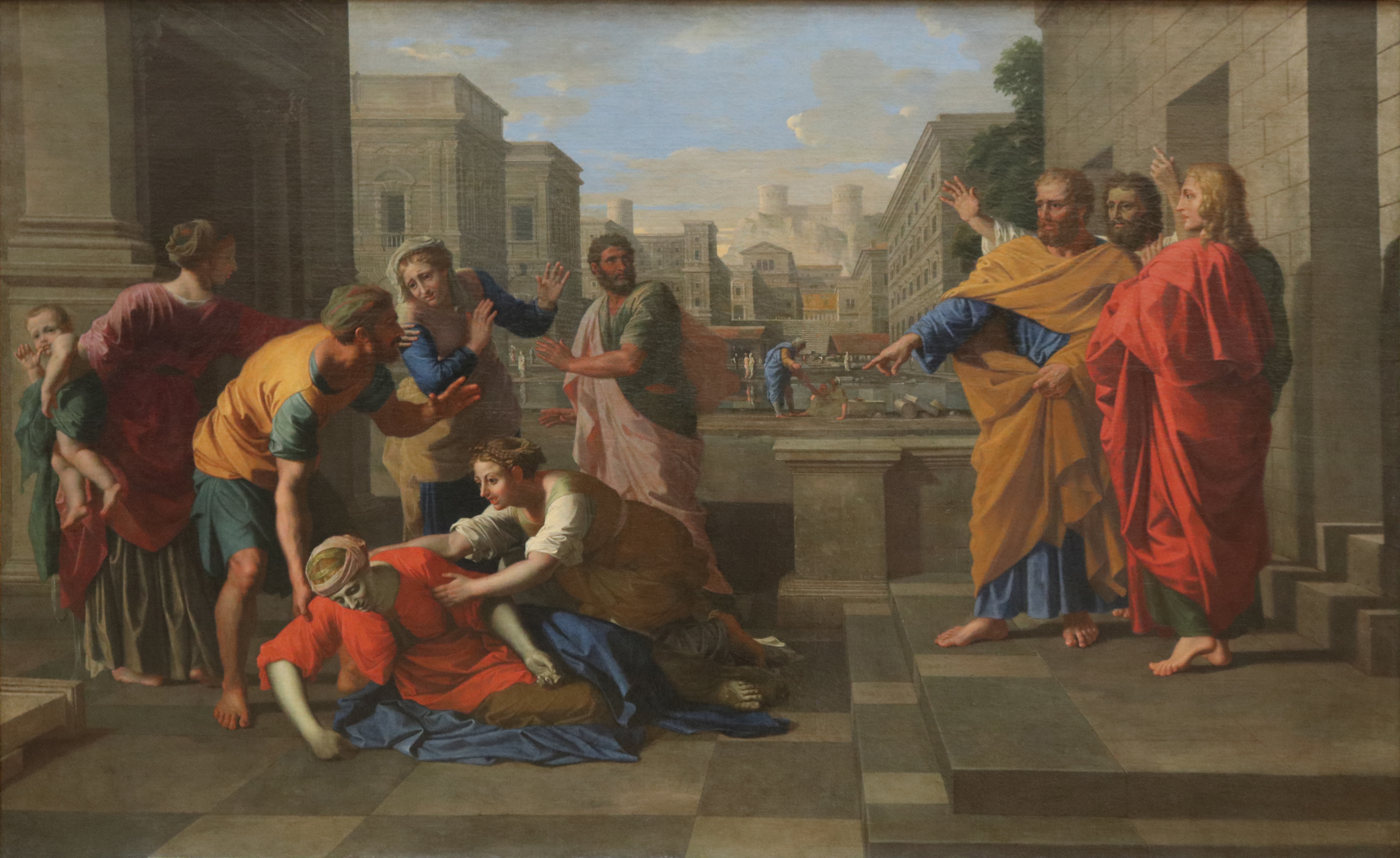
Nicolas Poussin, Death of Sapphira, Louvre

The Lutheran New Testament Professor Matthew L. Skinner claims the story is meant to be gallows humour. He states: "The story aims for gallows humor, but we read Acts in a different place today. Our familiarity with religiously sanctioned violence makes it difficult to laugh, even if we understand that this scene may not be offered as serious, definitive theology."

Marc Pernot, pastor at the Protestant L'Oratoire du Louvre in Paris, sees the story as a critique of the shortcomings of Peter and the early Church. He states, "When men want to impose unity, there are problems. [...]" In his view, "This is compulsory morality ...", and "Jesus never instituted a system requiring people to liquidate all their capital ...". He concludes that the author of the book of Acts, Luke, "thus presents Peter and his first church rather critically. In my opinion it is not the only time...".

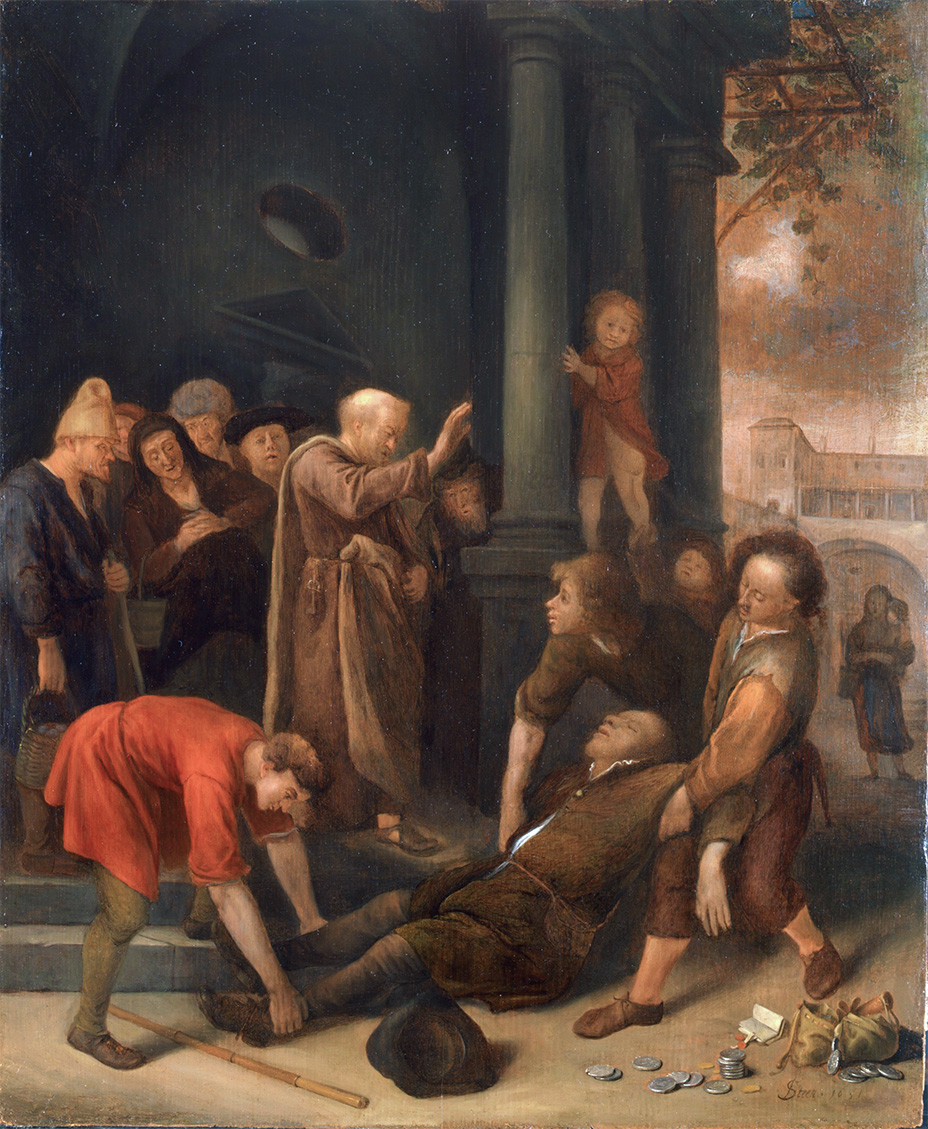
Jan Steen, The Death of Ananias

P. M. Garner reads the story as subversive narrative showing Peter, complicit in the deaths of Ananias and Sapphira, showing immaturity in imaging the son of God.

According to the missionary and author Paris Reidhead, the passage is intended to illustrate two key points: the seriousness of lying to the Holy Spirit and the importance of keeping integrity in the believers' fellowship with Christ, i.e., keeping the fellowship free of sin. More specifically on the second point, Reidhead commented that the introduction of sin would destroy the unity that the early believers had in the Holy Spirit, and would thus remove God's blessing on the body. Reidhead noted that God does not punish everyone who makes the same mistake as Ananias and Sapphira; nevertheless, the passage illustrates God's unambiguous attitude on this matter. Though the passage is about the offering of money, Reidhead extended the implication to all services offered to God. There must not be any ulterior motives in an offering made to God, such as desiring material gain, fame, or praise of man for oneself. Concerning the belief held by some, that Peter caused the death of the couple, Reidhead held the view that Peter simply anticipated God's action and relayed it to Ananias and Sapphira before God took the action.

J. P. Kirsch, writing for the Catholic Encyclopedia, depicts the event as a sentence of capital punishment. It states: "When Ananias and Sapphira attempt to deceive the Apostles and the people Peter appears as judge of their action, and God executes the sentence of punishment passed by the Apostle by causing the sudden death of the two guilty parties (Acts 5:1–11)".

Philosopher Edward Feser argues in a self-published blog that the account constitutes a biblical justification of capital punishment, whereby Peter either declares or carries out the sentence, which is then immediately inflicted by the Holy Spirit.

== See also ==
- Onan
- Uzzah
