= Acts 9 =

- ← chapter 8 chapter 10 →
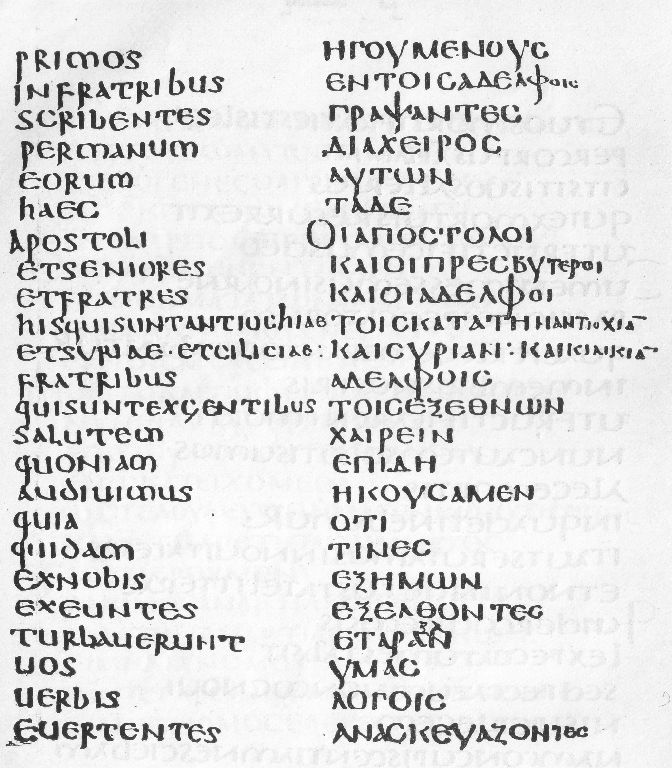
- Acts 15:22–24 in Latin (left column) and Greek (right column) in Codex Laudianus, written about AD 550.
- Book: Acts of the Apostles
- Category: Church history
- Christian Bible part: New Testament
- Order in the Christian part: 5

Acts 9 is the ninth chapter of the Acts of the Apostles in the New Testament of the Christian Bible. It records Saul's conversion and the works of Saint Peter. Early Christian tradition uniformly affirmed that Luke composed this book as well as the Gospel of Luke. Critical opinion on the tradition was evenly divided at the end of the 20th century.

== Text ==
The original text was written in Koine Greek. This chapter is divided into 43 verses.

=== Textual witnesses ===
Some early manuscripts containing the text of this chapter are:

In Greek

- Papyrus 53 (3rd century; extant verses 33 to chapter 10:1)
- Codex Vaticanus (325–350)
- Codex Sinaiticus (330–360)
- Codex Bezae (~400)
- Codex Alexandrinus (400–440)
- Codex Ephraemi Rescriptus (~450)
- Codex Laudianus (~550)

In Latin

- León palimpsest (7th century; complete)

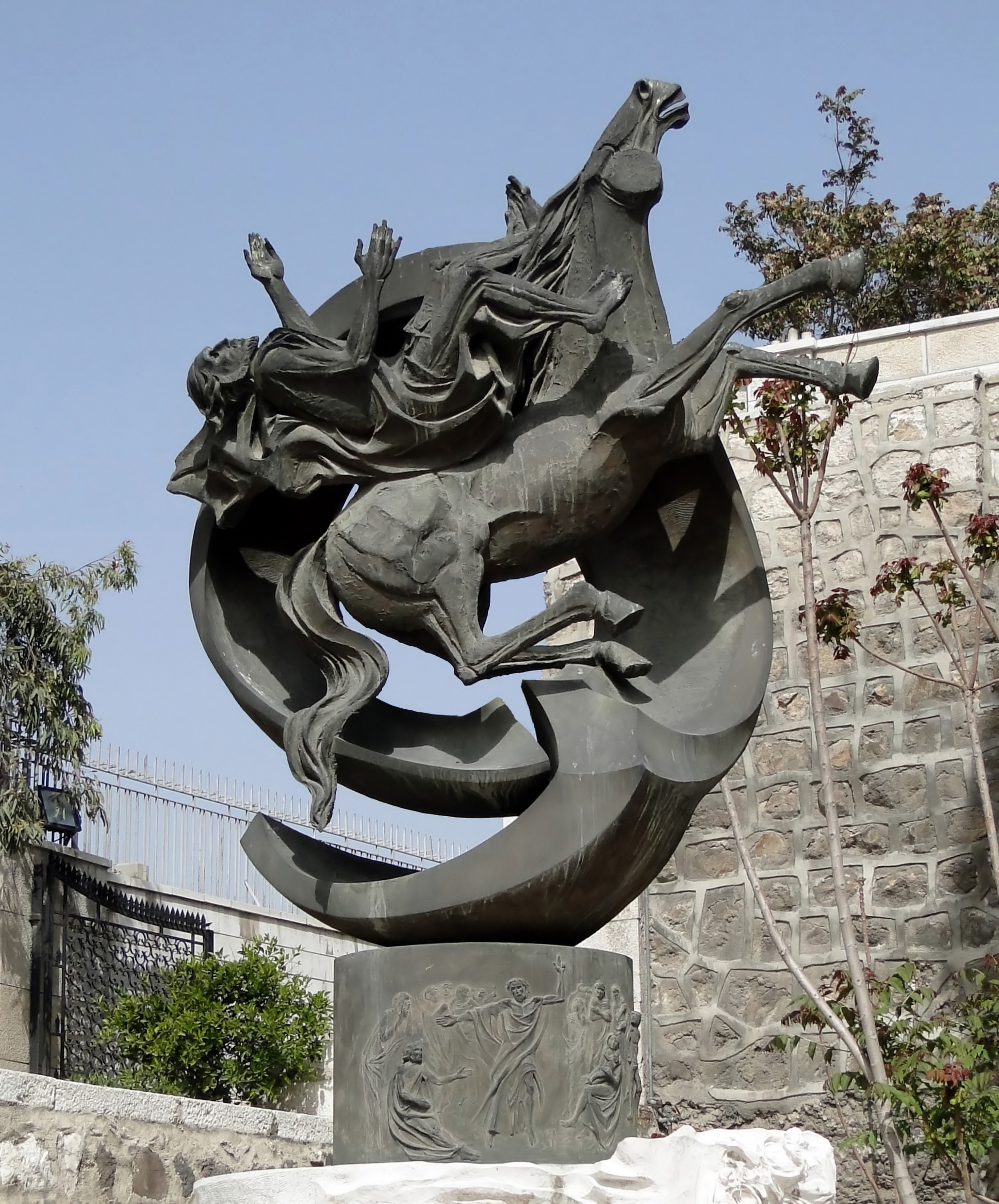
Statue of Saint Paul in Damascus.

=== New Testament references ===
- Acts 9:34: 2 Corinthians 11:32

=== New Testament references ===
- Acts 9:1–9: Acts 22:6–16; Acts 26:12–18

== On the Damascus Road (9:1–9) ==
The purposeful journey to Damascus by Saul (verses 1–2) was abruptly halted (verses 3–4) when a heavenly light blinded him (verse 8) while a heavenly voice made his followers speechless (verse 7), so now Saul had to be 'told what to do' (verse 6) and 'led by the hand' (verse 8). What was the most terrifying for Saul is that the heavenly voice was the voice of 'Jesus, whom you are persecuting' (verse 5), confirming that 'Stephen's vision (Acts 7:56) was not total delusion'.

=== Verse 5 ===
"Who are you, Lord?” Saul asked.

"I am Jesus, whom you are persecuting", he replied.

The words "It is hard for you to kick against goads" are added in some translations, which reflect Saul's (Paul's) later account of the experience in Acts 26:14. A goad is a traditional farming implement, used to spur or guide livestock, usually oxen, who are pulling a plough or a cart. The King James Version has "kick against the pricks".

== Ananias's vision (9:10–19) ==
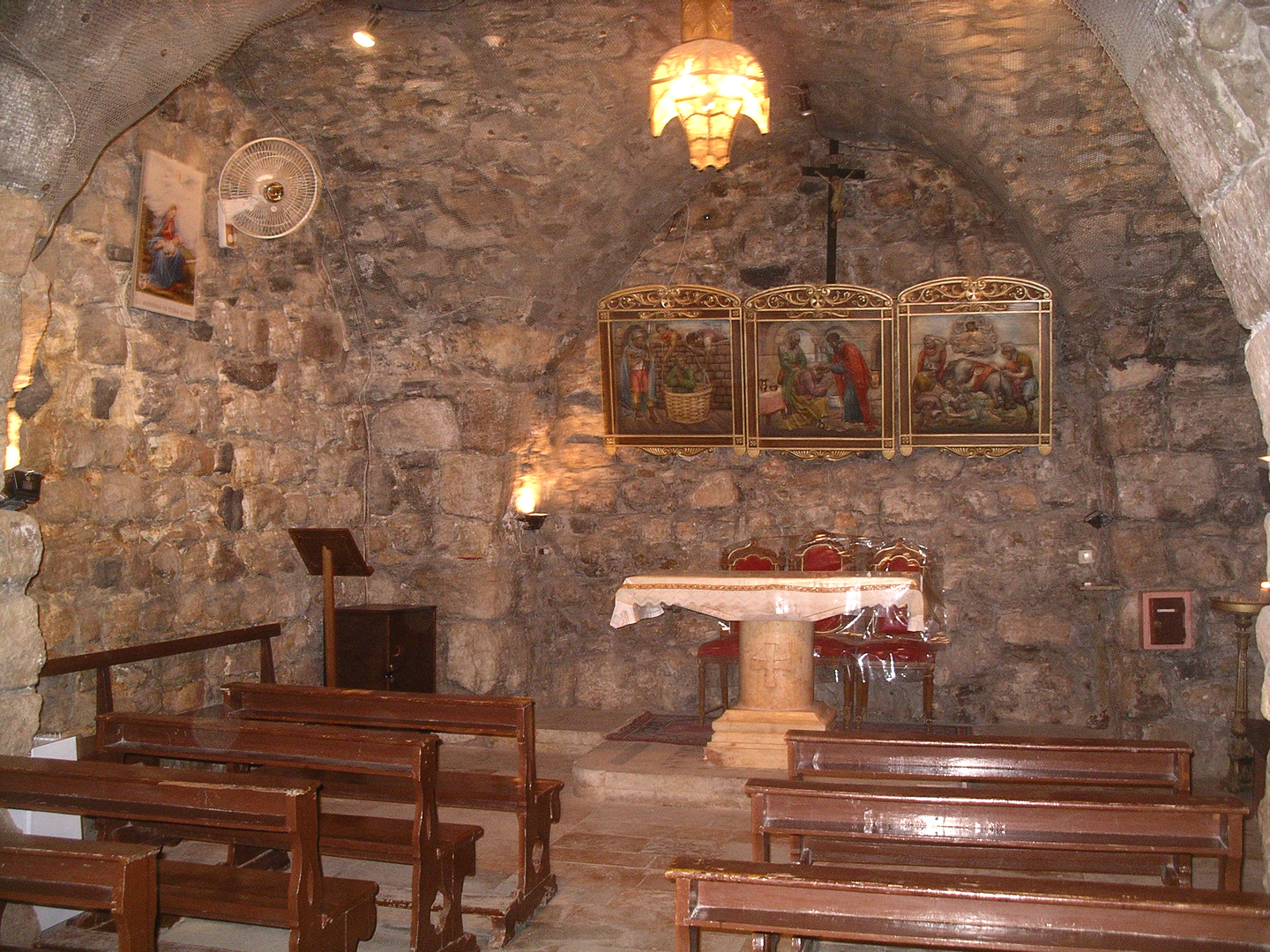
The house believed to be of Ananias of Damascus in Damascus

Just like the story of Cornelius, there were two visions involved in Saul's story, 'each confirming the other'. While Saul was blinded from his vision and in chastened state ('he is praying', verse 11), Ananias, who was a resident of Damascus (verse 13) and a disciple of Christ (verse 10), received instructions with precise directions to Saul's address (verse 11; the 'street called Straight' is still shown in the Old City of Damascus). It also contains 'a divine commission' (in distinctly Pauline language) highlighting the contrast between Saul's dark past and God's 'elective grace' (verse 15: cf. 1 Corinthians 15:9–10; Romans 9:23) for Saul's future career, as prophetically outlined in verses 15–16. Ananias was initially reluctant and argued with 'the Lord' (cf. Moses in Exodus 3:11–4:17), but he obediently followed the instructions with generous response (verse 17) to lay hands (primarily for healing) and to baptize Saul (verse 18).

=== Verse 17 ===
And Ananias went his way and entered the house; and laying his hands on him he said, "Brother Saul, the Lord Jesus, who appeared to you on the road as you came, has sent me that you may receive your sight and be filled with the Holy Spirit."

=== Verse 19 ===
So when he had received food, he was strengthened. Then Saul spent some days with the disciples at Damascus.

John Gill suggested in his Exposition of the Bible that these disciples were among those dispersed from Jerusalem to Judea and Samaria at the onset of the Christian persecution described in Acts 8:1.

== Saul in Damascus (9:19–25) ==
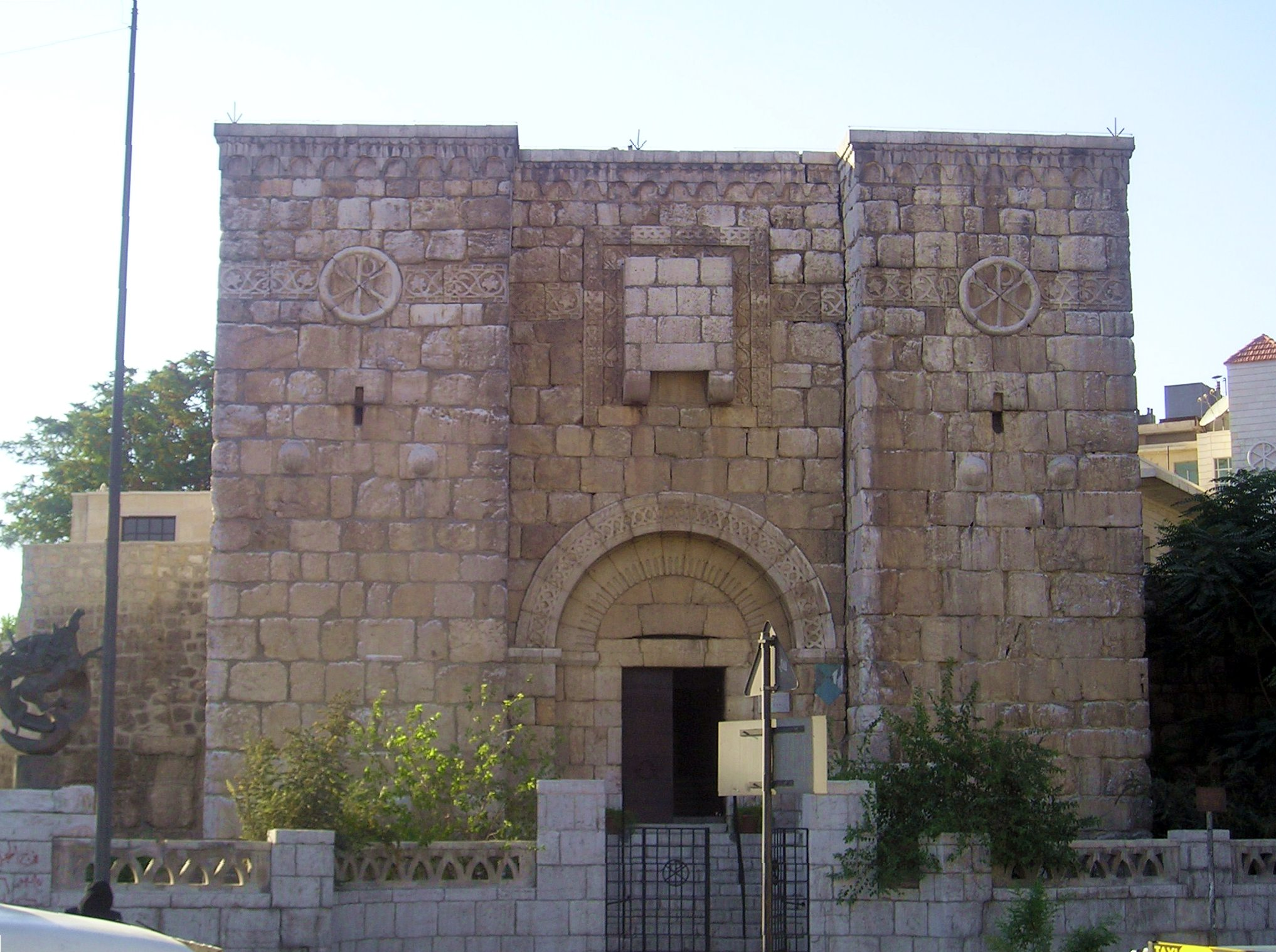
Bab Kisan gate (now Chapel of Saint Paul), believed to be where Paul escaped from persecution in Damascus

Saul's conversion immediately showed apparent effect, as characteristically recorded in Luke's style to be a 'universal amazement' (verse 21). Luke's narrative here and Paul's own account of his conversion in Galatians 1 are not identical but reconcilable: Paul did not mention that his call was in Damascus, yet in Galatians 1:17 after going to Arabia, Paul wrote that he 'returned to Damascus', implying that the call took place there. Another mention of Damascus in Paul's letters is at 2 Corinthians 11:32 in relation to his escape (being let down over the walls in a basket), which could hardly have happened twice, so it must refer to the same episode. In the epistle to the Corinthians, Paul wrote that the person wanting to capture him was Aretas, the king of the Arabian kingdom of Nabatea, who only had any kind of judicial authority in Damascus between 37 and 39 CE, thus providing a narrow date range for the event.

=== Verse 19 ===
and after taking some food, he regained his strength. For several days he was with the disciples in Damascus.

Alford suggests these were "a few days: of quiet, and becoming acquainted with [the disciples] as brethren", who previously he had persecuted. "Nor was the time longer than to admit of εὐθέως (eutheōs, immediately) being used in verse 20: "and immediately he began to proclaim Jesus in the synagogues, saying, 'He is the Son of God'."

=== Verse 25 ===
Then the disciples took him by night and let him down through the wall in a large basket.

- Cross reference: 2 Corinthians 11:33
- Saul or Paul was helped to escape the city in a similar manner to how Rahab helped two spies to escape prior to the Battle of Jericho (Joshua 2:15), and Michal, the daughter of King Saul helped her husband, David (1 Samuel 19:12).

== Saul returns to Jerusalem (9:26–30) ==
Compared to Paul's account in Galatians 1, Luke seems to imply a short interval before Paul's first Jerusalem visit (see verse 19b), 'a longer stay in Jerusalem, and a meeting with more than one apostle' (verse 27), but the two accounts simply provide different perspectives on the same event. Luke's account highlights the suspicion of the Jerusalem church to Saul (verses 26–27) and the 'relative independence' of Paul's gospel teaching from 'apostolic control'. It brings the 'narrative circle back to its point of departure in chapter 6', that 'Saul, the zealous young man who approved of the killing of Stephen', returned to Jerusalem to finish Stephen's argument with the Hellenists and 'arouses the same violent response'. The 'brothers' could not control the situation, so perceiving a great danger had Saul hurriedly sent off to Tarsus, his hometown (verse 30; cf. Galatians 1:21), while he was 'still unknown by sight to most members of the Judean churches' (Galatians 1:22).

=== Verse 26 ===
And when Saul had come to Jerusalem, he tried to join the disciples; but they were all afraid of him, and did not believe that he was a disciple.

Henry Alford reflects on the possible routes Saul might have taken: "probably ... on the Roman road, i.e. that of the Itineraries", from Damascus to Gadara, crossing the River Jordan south of Lake Tiberias, then to Scythopolis (modern Beit She'an), Shechem and Jerusalem. Alternatively there would have been routes he could take via the road to Petra, crossing the Jordan near Jericho, or towards Caesarea Philippi and then on the Egyptian caravan-track, which passes to the north of Lake Tiberias. He estimates that the journey would have taken "five to six days, the distance being 130 to 150 miles".

== Summary and transition (9:31) ==
The summary verse at the end brings the narrative to the main thread, with glimpses of the scattered groups of 'brothers' or 'disciples' (both men and women) under the guidance of the Spirit spreading their faith. However, 'behind this diversity is a larger unity', called 'the church' (in the singular) that was growing and 'being built up' throughout the region. Until now, Luke has recorded 'dramatic scenes of conversion and conflict' in various cities: Jerusalem (chapters 1–7), Samaria (chapter 8), one encounter on the desert road (chapter 8) and then Damascus (chapter 9), with the underlying steady consolidation behind the scenes and in the country regions: Samaria (cf. 8:25), Judea and Galilee, and all along the coastal plain (cf. 8:40).

== Harmonizing the narratives of Paul's conversion ==
According to the New Testament, this event took place in the life of Paul the Apostle which led him to cease persecuting early Christians and to become a follower of Jesus. It is normally dated by researchers to AD 33–36. The phrases Pauline conversion, Damascene conversion and Damascus Christophany, and road to Damascus allude to this event. Within the New Testament, Paul's conversion experience is discussed in both Paul's own letters and in the book known by the title Acts of the Apostles. According to both sources, Paul was never a follower of Jesus and did not know Jesus before his crucifixion. Instead, he severely persecuted the early Christians. Although Paul refers to himself as an "Apostle" of Jesus, it is clear that Paul was not one of "The Twelve" apostles. Paul's conversion occurred after Jesus' crucifixion. The accounts of Paul's conversion experience describe it as miraculous, supernatural, or otherwise revelatory in nature.

== Peter and Aeneas (9:32–35) ==
Verse 31 leads the narrative back to the Jerusalem church and to Peter as its 'chief figurehead', as he went 'here and there among the believers' (verse 32) suggesting how the church was 'built up' (verse 31) and implying Peter's 'pastoral oversight over the who church' ('all'), which by then included 'believers in the towns of the coastal plain'. The communities may have been founded as suggested in Acts 8:40 from Lydda (the modern 'Lod') to Sharon (in the region of Sarona), northwards along the coast towards Caesarea. Two brief miracle stories displayed Peter's power as a healer, an echo to the healing miracles of Jesus, as Luke is careful to stress that 'Peter heals in Jesus' name, not his own' (verse 34).

== The healing of Tabitha (9:36–43) ==
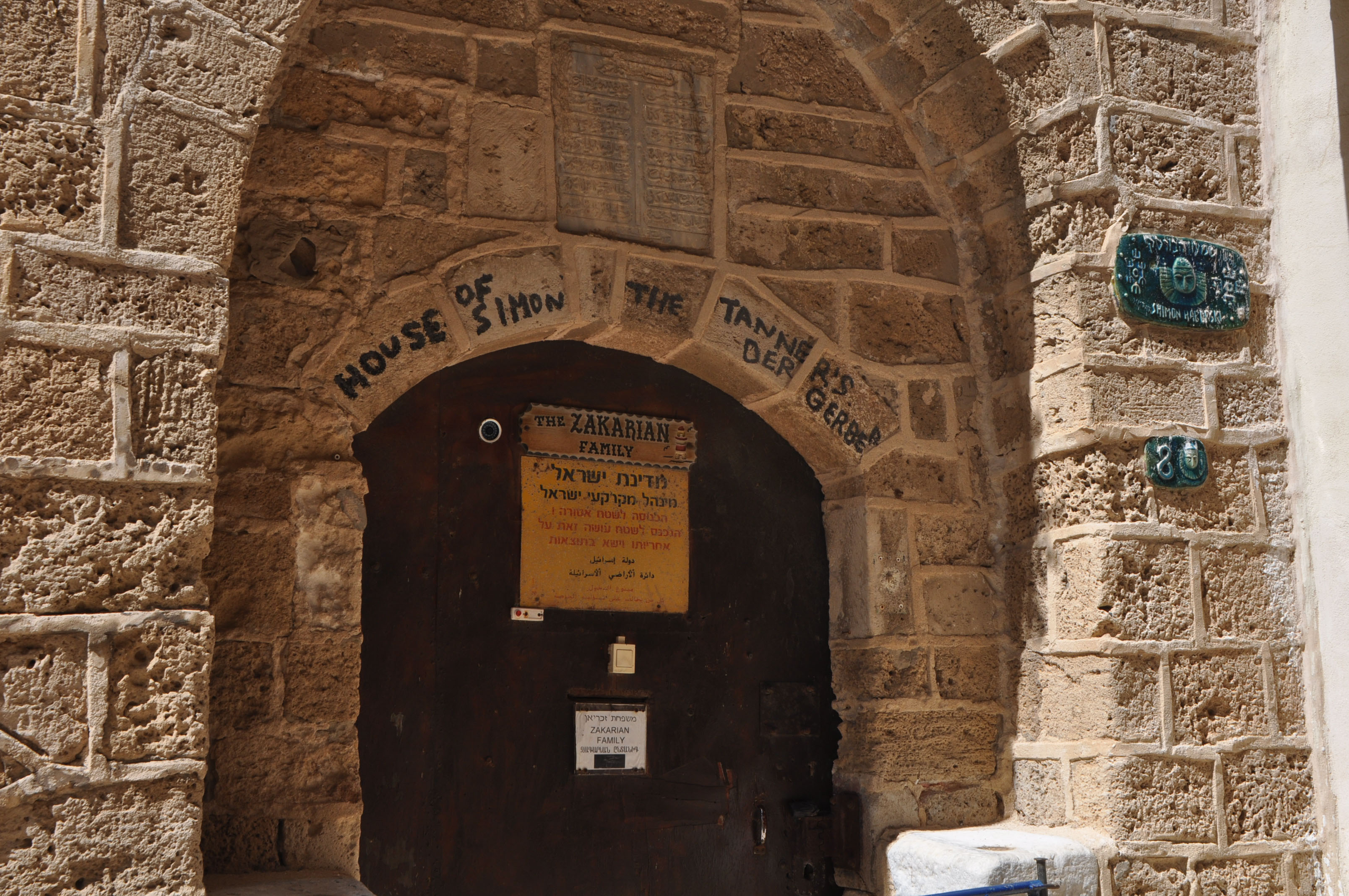
The entrance to Simon the Tanner's house in Joppa (Jaffa), where Peter stayed (Acts 9:43).

The author uses the unusual term mathetria for a woman disciple (outside the church, women would not often be characterized as 'students') in the fledgling community at the port of Joppa (Jaffa), called "Tabitha" (Greek Dorcas: both names mean 'gazelle'), who had a charitable ministry (a clothing club) among the women of the town, in particular, the widows (verse 39). The term 'upper room' (verse 39) and Peter's prayer (verse 40) relate to the resurrection miracles of Elijah and Elisha in 1 Kings 17:17–24 and 2 Kings 4:33 (cf. Luke 4:26–27, but with the closest parallel to the gospel story of Jesus' healing of Jairus' daughter (Mark 5:22–24, 5:35–43 and parallels). Intriguingly, only Mark records the Aramaic words Jesus uttered to the child, talitha cum (Mark 5:41) which is so close to Peter's words here (though in the gospel story talitha is not a name).

== See also ==
- Ananias of Damascus
- Caesarea Maritima
- Damascus
- Joppa
- Jerusalem
- John the Apostle
- Judea
- Lydda
- Paul the Apostle
- Tarsus
- Samaria
- Saint Peter
- Related Bible parts: Joshua 2, 1 Samuel 19, Isaiah 53, Acts 8, Acts 22, Acts 26, 2 Corinthians 11, Galatians 1

== Sources ==
- Alexander, Loveday (2007). "62. Acts". In Barton, John; Muddiman, John (eds.). The Oxford Bible Commentary (first (paperback) ed.). Oxford University Press. pp. 1028–1061. ISBN 978-0199277186.
