= Papyrus 8 =

New Testament 4th century papyrus fragment of the Acts of the Apostles in Greek

Papyrus 𝔓^{8}
- New Testament manuscript
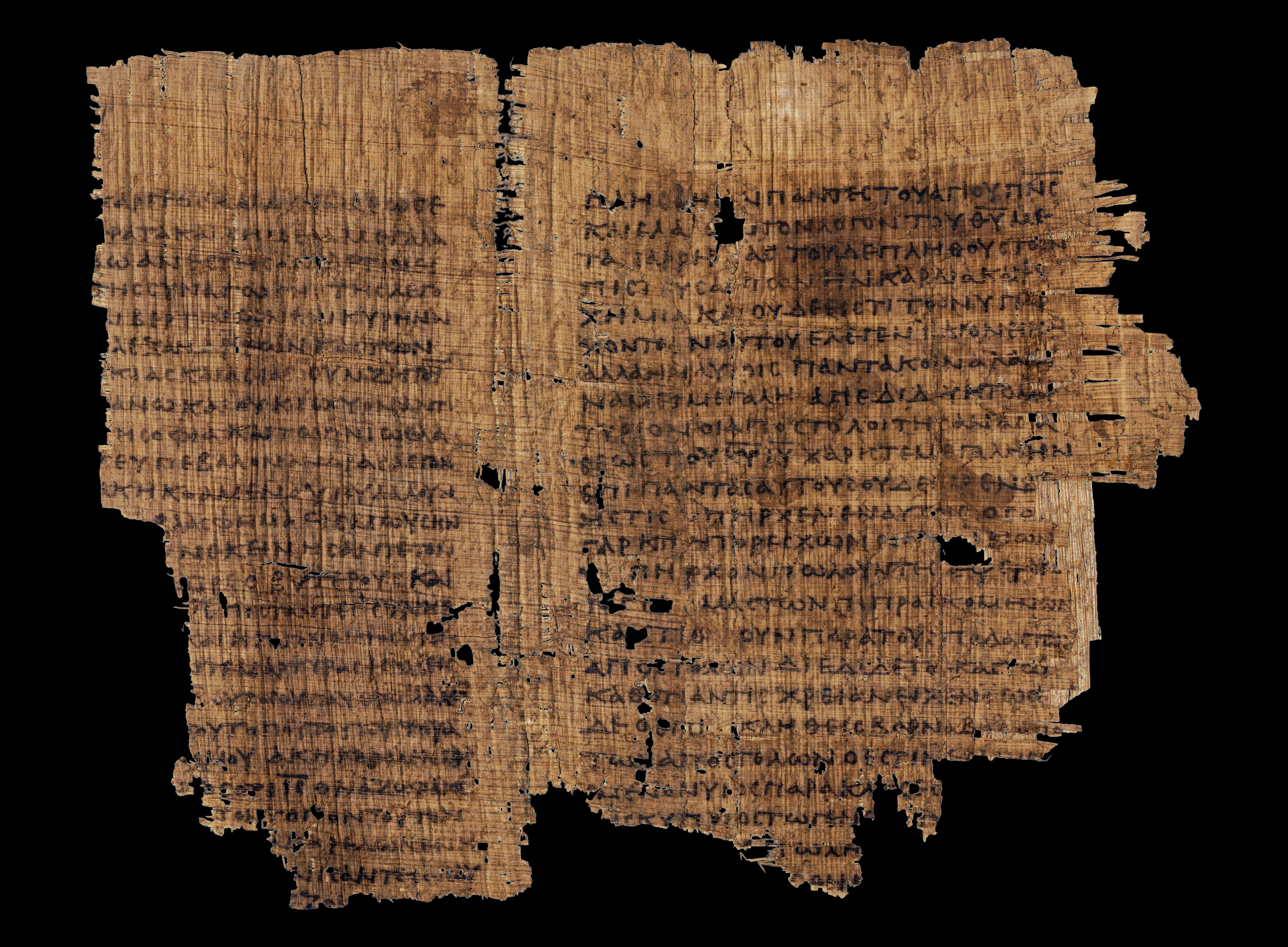
- Recto
- Text: Acts 4–6 †
- Date: 4th century
- Script: Greek
- Found: Egypt
- Now at: Staatliche Museen zu Berlin
- Cite: A. H. Salonius, Die griechischen Handschriftenfragmente des Neuen Testaments in den Staatlichen Museen zu Berlin, ZNW 26 (1927), 97–119
- Size: 18.6 by 10.4 cm
- Type: Alexandrian text-type
- Category: II

Papyrus 8 (in the Gregory-Aland numbering), signed by 𝔓^{8} or α 8 (von Soden), is an early copy of the New Testament in Greek. It is a papyrus manuscript of the Acts of the Apostles, it contains Acts 4:31–37; 5:2–9; 6:1–6.8–15. The manuscript paleographically has been assigned to the 4th century.

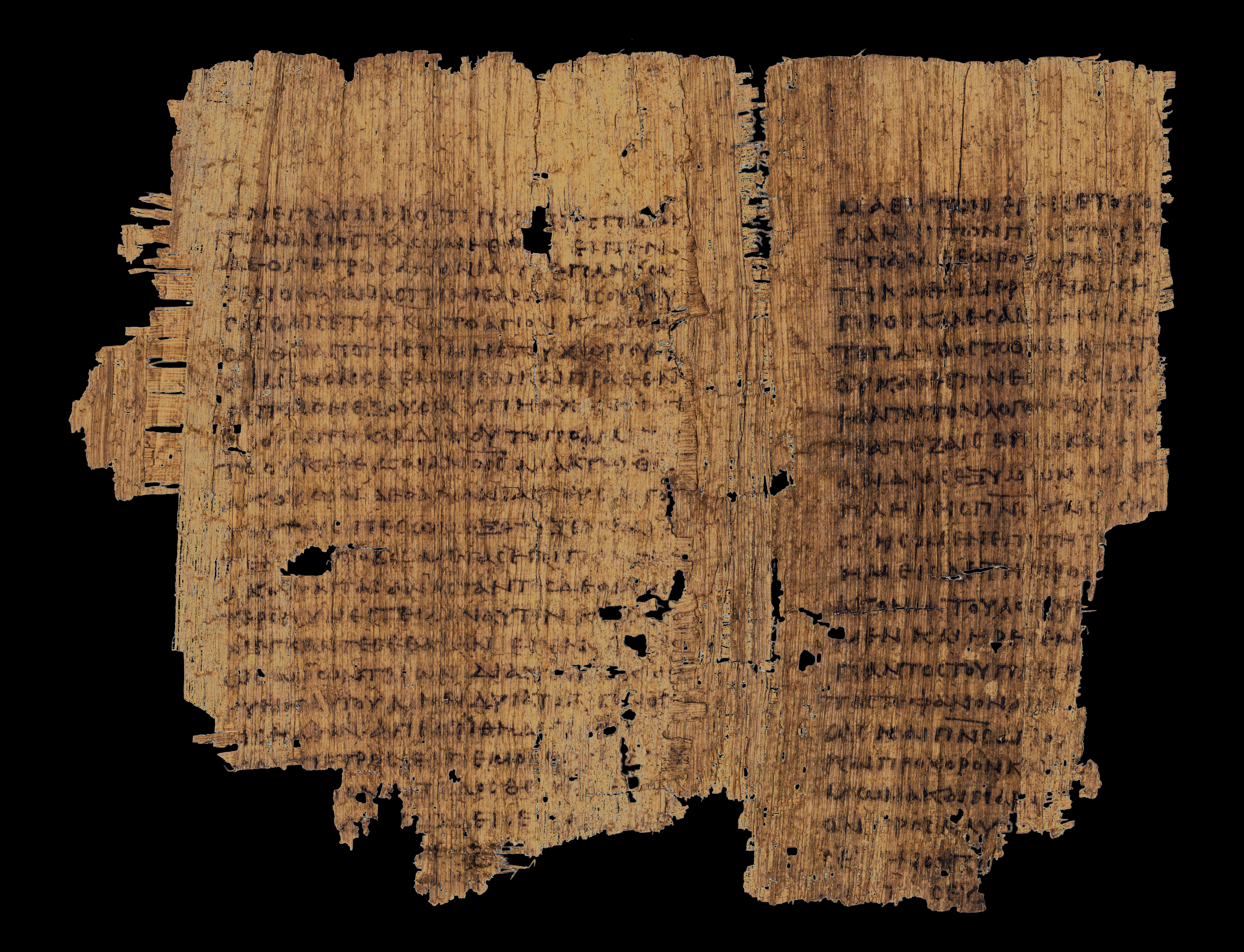
Verso

The text is written in two columns per page, 25 lines per page.

== Text ==
The Greek text of this codex is a representative of the Alexandrian text-type. Aland placed it in Category II.

The text of the codex was published by Salonius in 1927.

== Location ==
It is currently housed at the Staatliche Museen zu Berlin and part of the Berlin Papyrus Collection (Papyrus Berlin 8683).

== See also ==
- Acts of the Apostles: chapter 4, 5, and 6
- List of New Testament papyri
