= Brescia Casket =

4th-century ivory box

Brescia Casket Lipsanotheca of Brescia
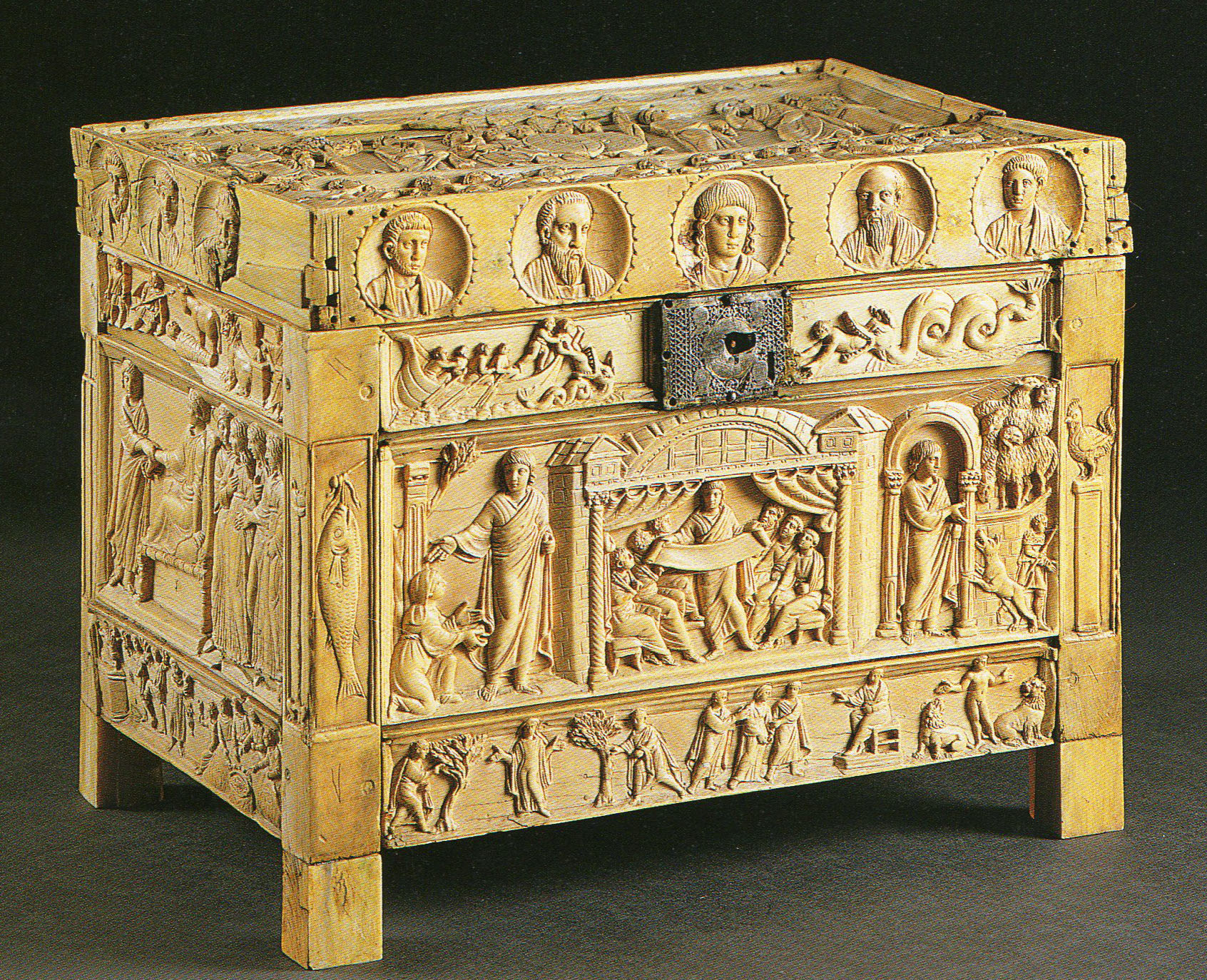
- Type: Reliquary box
- Material: Ivory, walnut (framework), silver (lock plate)
- Length: 25 cm (9.8 in)
- Height: 22 cm (8.7 in)
- Width: 32 cm (13 in)
- Created: Late 4th century AD
- Discovered: San Salvatore, Brescia, Italy
- Present location: Museo di Santa Giulia, Brescia, Italy
- Culture: Early Christian / Late Roman

The Brescia Casket, also called the lipsanotheca of Brescia (in Italian lipsanoteca) or reliquary of Brescia, is an ivory box, perhaps a reliquary, from the late 4th century, which is now in the Museo di Santa Giulia at San Salvatore in Brescia, Italy. It is a virtually unique survival of a complete Early Christian ivory box in generally good condition. The 36 subjects depicted on the box represent a wide range of the images found in the evolving Christian art of the period, and their identification has generated a great deal of art-historical discussion, though the high quality of the carving has never been in question. According to one scholar: "despite an abundance of resourceful and often astute exegesis, its date, use, provenance, and meaning remain among the most formidable and enduring enigmas in the study of early Christian art."

The complex iconography of the five faces is illustrated and identified below.

== History ==
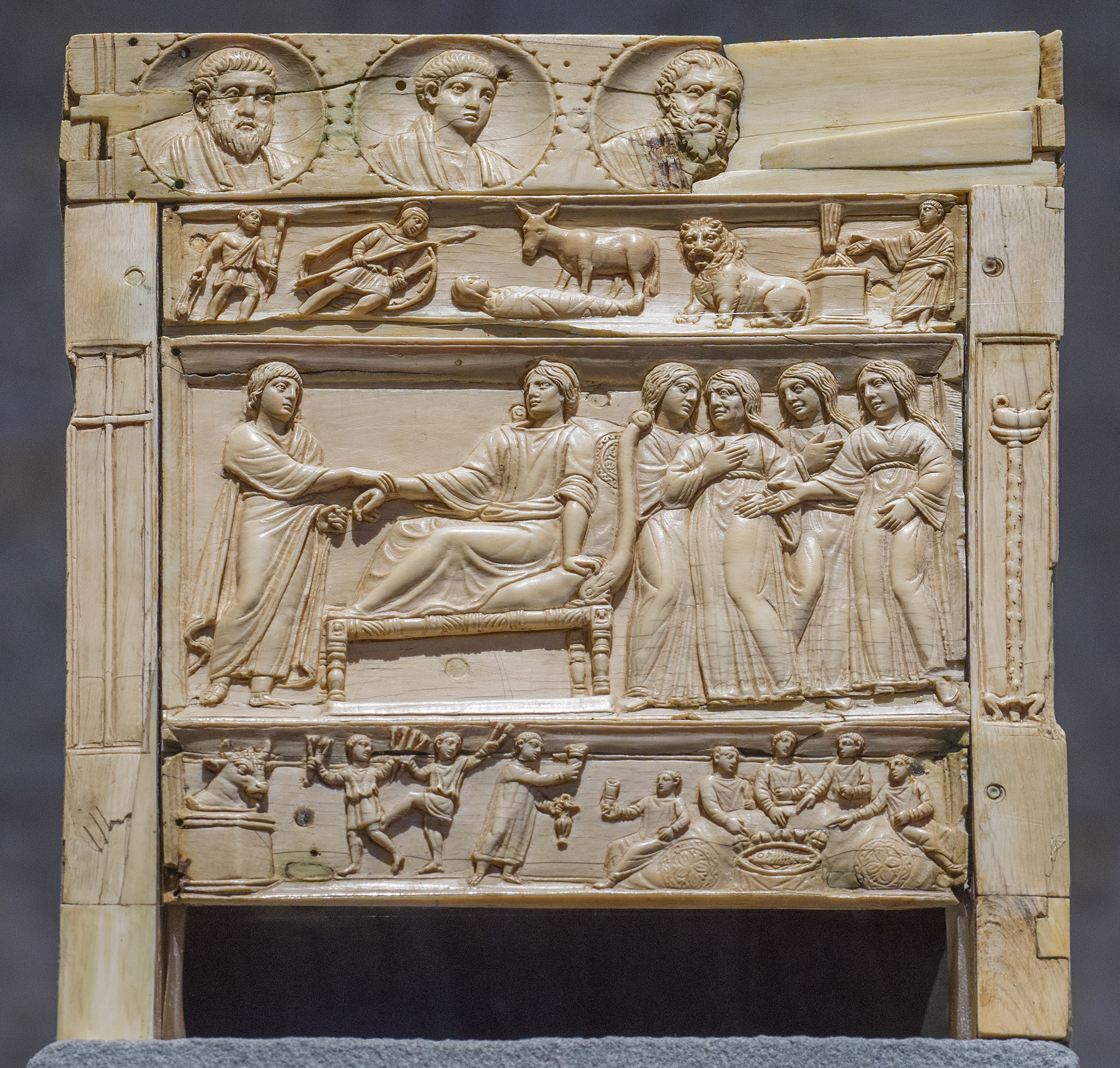
The left side. See below for the subjects.

The box was made by a northern Italian workshop, probably in Milan, where Saint Ambrose was bishop, and engaged in a struggle with the Arian heresy. Milan has long been considered the most likely place of origin, which has been further strengthened after the insignia on the shields of the soldiers were identified as those of a unit of the Palatine Guards stationed in Milan in the late 4th century, when Milan was the usual residence of the Imperial court. The Notitia Dignitatum in the Bodleian Library in Oxford records these designs. One theory, discussed below, identifies the date very precisely to soon after 386, when Ambrose successfully led the Orthodox population in a confrontation with the Arian-leaning Imperial court. It has also been suggested that it was used for the relics of Gervasius and Protasius, two Milanese Roman martyr saints whose remains were translated (dug up and moved) in Ambrose's time, as recorded in a letter of his; this was one of the earliest translations recorded. The silver lock plate is later, probably from the 8th century, and later metal hinges were removed in 1928.

It is not known when it entered the keeping of the convent of San Salvatore, Brescia, but it may well have been soon after it was founded in 753 by Desiderius, last of the Lombard kings. Whatever its original function it was used as a reliquary in the Middle Ages, and was referred to in monastery documents as the "ivory sepulchre", possibly because it contained a stone taken from the empty tomb in the Church of the Holy Sepulchre in Jerusalem. It played a special role in the convent's Easter liturgy, when in the early part of the Easter Vigil it was opened and the contents displayed to the congregation.

In 1798, with the suppression of the convent after the Napoleonic invasion, it was transferred to the Biblioteca Queriniana, the main library in Brescia, and in 1882 transferred to the museum that, after some moves, since 1999 has occupied part of the old convent home of the box. At some point during this period it was dismantled and the panels displayed laid out flat on a board forming a cross shape with a frame. The box was restored and re-assembled in 1928.

== Description ==
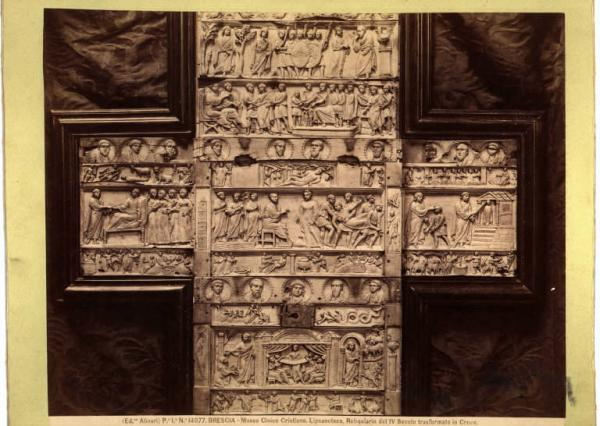
The Brescia Casket dismantled and framed, as it was displayed before 1928

The casket is rectangular, with five faces, four sides and a lid, held together by an internal framework of walnut wood, replaced when the casket was returned to its proper format in 1928 when the current short ivory feet were also added. Numerous carved ivory plaques are attached to the framework, carrying the decoration, with most zones of decoration on their own individual plaques. The casket measures 22 centimetres (8.7 in) high, 32 centimetres (13 in) wide and 25 centimetres (9.8 in) deep.

The casket is covered with a profusion of small religious scenes carved in ivory relief, drawn from both the Old and New Testaments. The lid, which may be regarded as the most important face of a small box such as this, has the largest reliefs, with five scenes from the Passion of Christ in two registers, and a small top register with a frieze of birds. All four sides follow a design with a middle register containing relatively large New Testament subjects. Above and below this are narrower registers with Old Testament scenes, and at the corners thin vertical images, only one containing a human figure, the rest symbolic objects. The top of the side faces is finished with a register, actually the sides of the lid, of busts of male figures in slightly flattened round clipea frames. Two of these are missing; there would have been a total of 17 originally, with five on the front, four on the back and four, one now missing, on each side. A young beardless Jesus is agreed to occupy the centre of the front panel, and he is probably surrounded by the Twelve Apostles, with Saint Paul substituting for Judas, making 13. Saints Peter and Paul are presumed to be the two older men with long beards flanking Jesus. The remaining four heads, presumably those on the back face, might be the Four Evangelists, which would mean repetition of subjects, or other saints.

The selection of incidents was long thought not to follow a specific programme, although Delbrueck in his monograph of 1939 was able to show that the majority of the scenes, including many of the rare ones, depicted events covered in the lectionary readings for the period of Lent and Easter that were used in Milan in Ambrose's time, about which we have a reasonable amount of information from Ambrose's surviving writings. Andre Grabar in 1969 wrote that "It is easy to establish the lack of any link (by likes or opposites) between the scenes on the two borders (Old Testament) and those of the central panel (New Testament)".

However recent studies have proposed that the casket in fact shows a coherent and carefully thought out programme, comprehending both Old and New Testament scenes, though the underlying aims of this have been interpreted differently. Many of the scenes are very rarely depicted in surviving art, and several have had new identifications proposed in recent decades. For Carolyn Joslin Watson, in a thesis of 1977 and an article in Gesta in 1981, the key to the programme lies in Milanese church politics of the time, and Ambrose's battle with the Arians. For Catherine Brown Tkacz, in a book of 2001, the main purpose of the programme is to state through typology the essential unity of the two parts of the Christian Bible, an aim common in later medieval art, which was previously thought not to have been found so early.

The identification of many of the scenes remains uncertain, with new identifications having been proposed only recently, and not all identifications agreed between, for example, Watson in 1981, Tkacz in 2001 and Bayens in 2004. The primary identifications here follow Watson, sometimes mentioning alternatives. Watson's notes summarize most but not all other identifications. For example, the scene on the back panel that Watson calls the Calling of Andrew and Peter by Jesus, which she admits is a rare subject not otherwise known in a similar composition, is called the Transfiguration of Christ by Tkacz, followed by Bayens and a number of reviewers. That would also be an unusual depiction, though of a far more common subject. The key difference in reading the image is whether the wavy lines the figures stand on represent cloud or water. All three authors are able to relate the subject they have chosen to their differing interpretations of the overall scheme of decoration.

=== Lid ===
frieze of birds, with nets or fabric: Jesus in the Garden of Gethsemane / Arrest of Christ / Denial of Peter, with crowing cock; Jesus before Annas and Caiaphas / / Pontius Pilate "washes his hands" of Jesus

=== Front ===
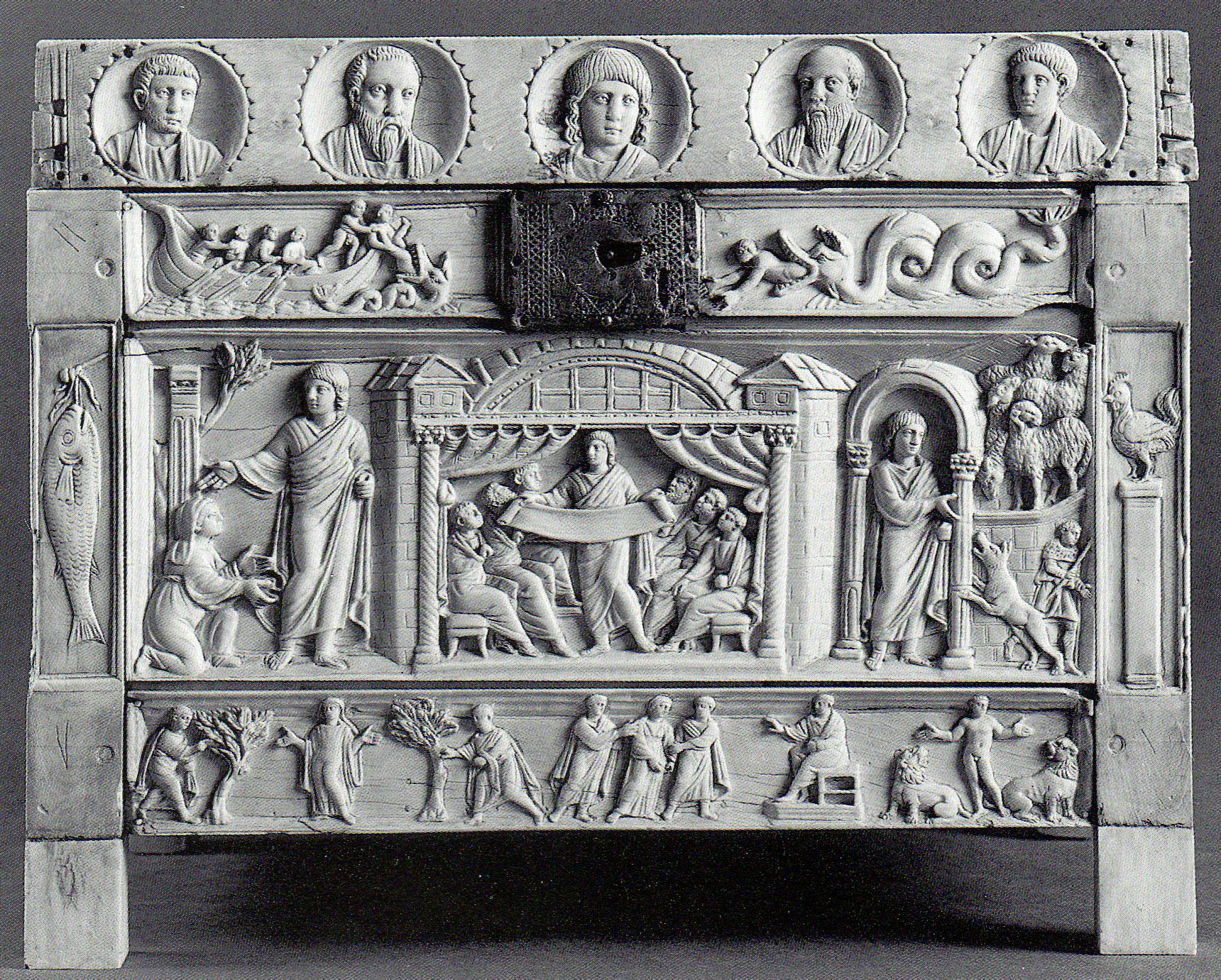

Apostle	Apostle – Peter?	Jesus	Apostle – Paul?	Apostle

Fish	Jonah swallowed by the whale	Silver lock with geometric motifs	Jonah cast up by the whale	Cock
Fish	Healing of the woman with an issue of blood (the haemorrhoissa)	Christ teaching in the synagogue at Nazareth	Parable of the Lost Sheep	Cock
Fish	Susanna and the witnesses	Trial of Susanna	Daniel in the lion's den	Cock

=== Right side ===
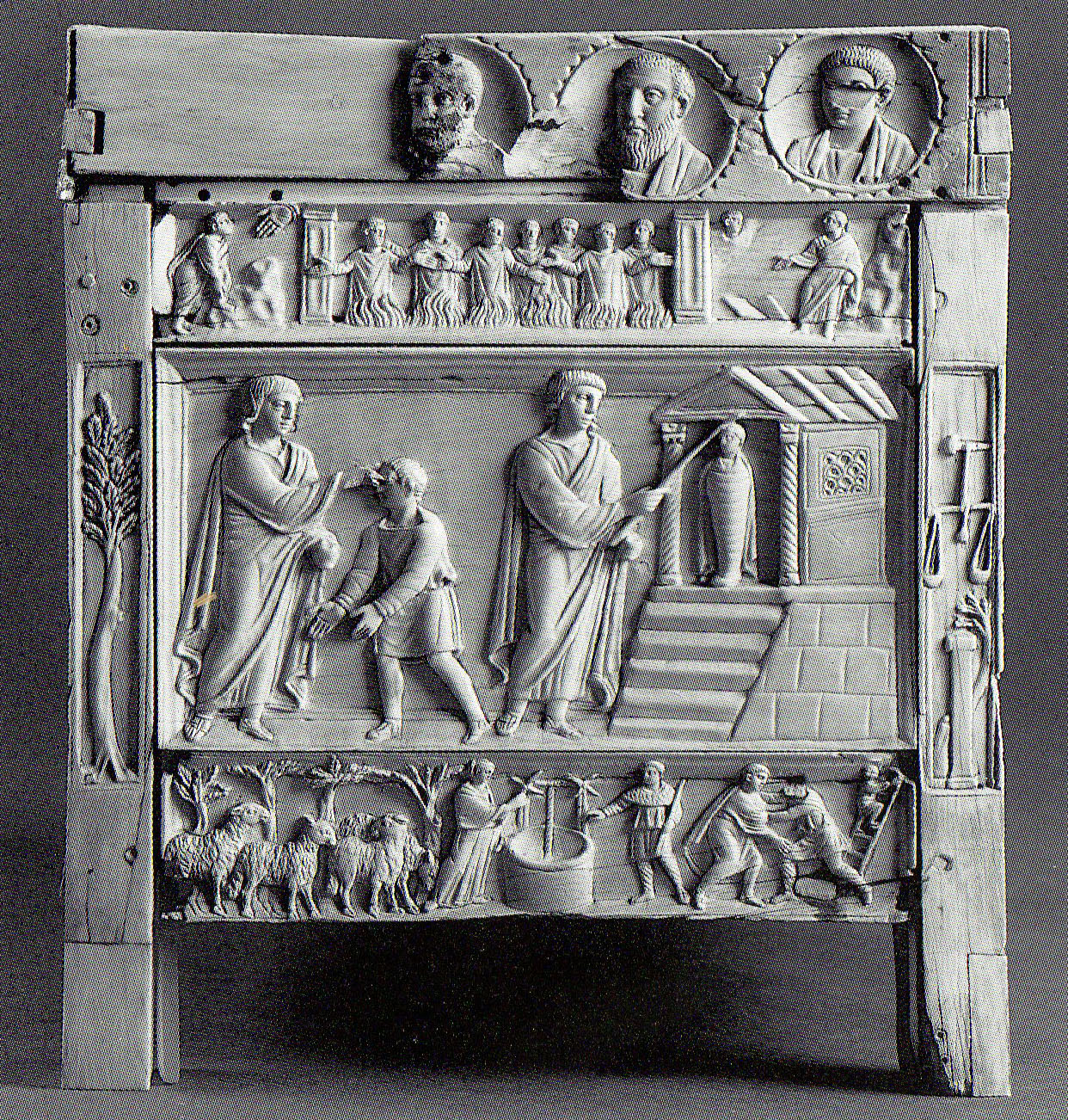

missing	Apostle	Apostle	Apostle

Tree	Moses on Mount Horeb	Death of the Seven Maccabean martyrs	Moses receives the Tablets of the Law	Scales
Tree	Healing of the Man born Blind		Resurrection of Lazarus	Scales
Tree	Jacob and Rachel at the well	Jacob Wrestling with the Angel	Jacob's Ladder	Scales

=== Left side ===
Apostle / Apostle / Apostle / missing; Cross / David kills Goliath / Death of the Man of God / Jeroboam at the Altar of Bethel / Lampstand; Cross / Resurrection of the daughter of Jairus / / / Lampstand; Cross / Worship of the Golden Calf / / Feast for the Golden Calf / Lampstand

=== Back ===
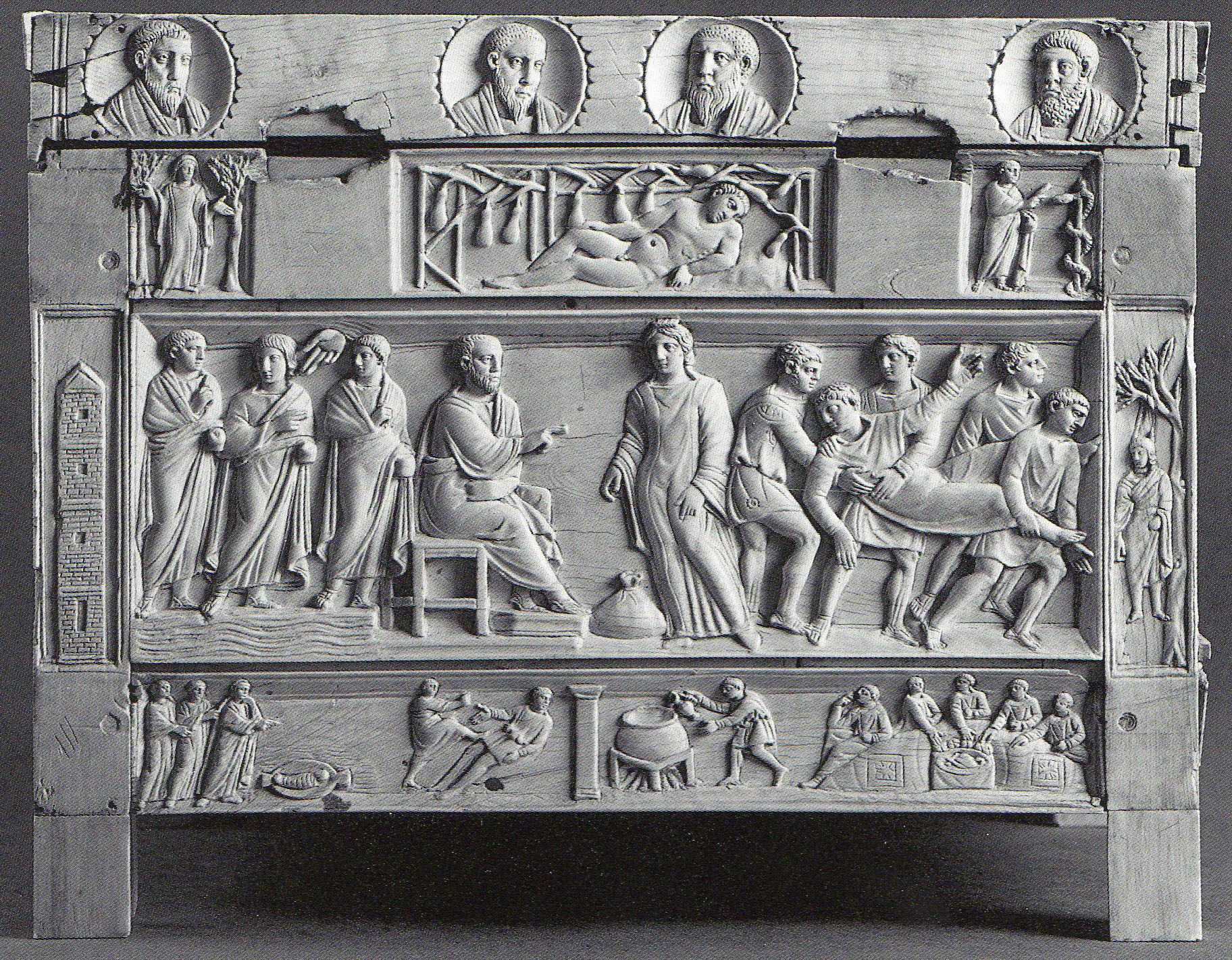

Apostle, Evangelist or saint	Apostle, Evangelist or saint	Apostle, Evangelist or saint	Apostle, Evangelist or saint

Tower	Susanna as orans	Jonah lying under the gourd	Daniel and the Dragon	Hanged man, probably Judas
Tower	Jesus calling Andrew and Peter, or the Transfiguration	Judgement of Ananias and Sapphira; Sapphira	Ananias being carried away	Hanged man, probably Judas
Tower	Finding of Moses	Moses kills the Egyptian	Feast in the House of Jethro	Hanged man, probably Judas

== Comparisons ==
Probably the closest direct comparison to the Brescia casket is the Pola Casket, found in a fragmentary condition under a church floor in Istria in 1906, which has fewer scenes, and those rather more conventional. Another smaller casket, now dismantled, with four Passion scenes is in the British Museum, which is also the home of most of the panels of the much later Anglo-Saxon Franks Casket (one panel is in the Bargello Museum, Florence). This has only one Christian scene, with others from northern myth and Mediterranean history, and includes texts which mingle Latin and Old English in both Roman letters and Anglo-Saxon runes. However it shares with the Brescia Casket great programmatic complexity, and an equal ability to arouse scholarly debate; it seems clear that the full meaning of both boxes would have represented a puzzle, or riddle, even to well-educated contemporaries used to the iconographies of their respective periods.
