= Synagogue of the Libertines =

Group of Hellenistic Jews mentioned in the Acts of the Apostles

According to the Acts of the Apostles, the Synagogue of the Libertines (e.g. King James Version, Wycliffe's Bible) or Synagogue of the Freedmen (e.g. New King James Version, New Revised Standard Version) were a group of Hellenistic Jews who disputed with Saint Stephen in Acts 6:9.

The Greek text of this verse reads:

ανεστησαν δε τινες των εκ της συναγωγης της λεγομενης λιβερτινων και κυρηναιων και αλεξανδρεων και των απο κιλικιας και ασιας συζητουντες τω στεφανω.

or in English:

Then there arose certain of the synagogue, which is called the synagogue of the Libertines, and Cyrenians, and Alexandrians, and of them of Cilicia and of Asia, disputing with Stephen.

== Libertines ==
The meaning of Libertine in this passage is different from the generally understood connotation of "a dissolute person". In this instance, "libertine" refers to one has been liberated, that is, a former slave or freedman. Those attending this particular synagogue might also include the descendants of such freedmen.

Opinion is divided as to the number of synagogues named here. The probability is that there are three, corresponding to the geographical regions involved, Rome and Italy, Northeast Africa, and Anatolia. In this case, the Synagogue of the Libertines is the assembly of the Freedmen from Rome, descendants of the Jews enslaved by Pompey after his conquest of Judea in 63 BC. However, λιβερτινων και κυρηναιων και αλεξανδρεων taken closely together, the first name must denote the people of some city or district. The obscure town Libertum inferred from the title Episcopus Libertinensis in connection with the synod of Carthage, AD 411 is less likely than the reading λιβιων underlying certain Armenian versions and Syriac commentaries. The Greek towns lying west from Cyrene would naturally be called Libyan. Consequently, these returned Jews, instead of being liberalized by their residence abroad, were more tenacious of Judaism and more bitter against Stephen than those who had never left Judaea.
