= Acts 8 =

- ← chapter 7 chapter 9 →
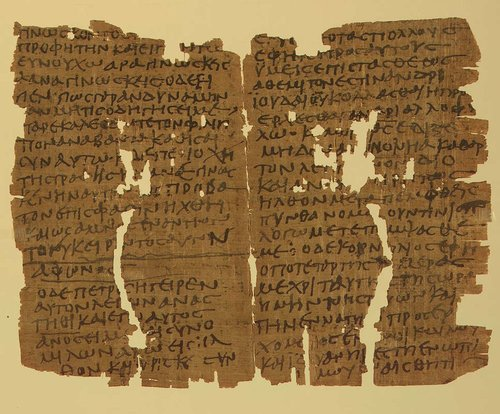
- Acts 8:26–32 in Papyrus 50, written in 3rd century.
- Book: Acts of the Apostles
- Category: Church history
- Christian Bible part: New Testament
- Order in the Christian part: 5

Acts 8 is the eighth chapter of the Acts of the Apostles in the New Testament of the Christian Bible. It records the burial of Stephen, the beginnings of Christian persecution, the spread of the Gospel of Jesus Christ to the people of Samaria and the conversion of an Ethiopian official. Early Christian tradition uniformly affirmed that Luke composed this book as well as the Gospel of Luke. Critical opinion on the tradition was evenly divided at the end of the 20th century. Parts of this chapter (verses 5-13 and 26-40) may have been drawn from an earlier "Philip cycle of stories" used by Luke in assembling his material.

== Text ==
The original text was written in Koine Greek. This chapter is divided into 40 verses.

=== Textual witnesses ===
Some early manuscripts containing the text of this chapter are:

In Greek

- Papyrus 50 (3rd century; extant verses 26–32)
- Codex Vaticanus (325–350)
- Codex Sinaiticus (330–360)
- Codex Bezae (c. 400)
- Codex Alexandrinus (400–440)
- Codex Ephraemi Rescriptus (c. 450)
- Codex Laudianus (c. 550)

In Latin

- León palimpsest (7th century; complete)

=== Old Testament references ===
- Acts 8:33: Isaiah 53:7,8

=== New Testament references ===
- Acts 8:1–2: Acts 7:60 (Stephen's Death)

== Locations ==
Places mentioned in this chapter (with Jerusalem as reference)

This chapter mentions the following places:

- Azotus
- Caesarea
- Aethiopia
- Gaza
- Jerusalem
- Judea
- Samaria

== Saul's approval of Stephen's death (8:1a) ==
The writer of Acts introduces Saul, later the Apostle Paul, as an active witness of Stephen's death in Acts 7:58, and confirmed his approval in Acts 8:1a. Reuben Torrey, in his Treasury of Scripture Knowledge, suggests that this clause [i.e. verse 8:1a] "evidently belongs to the conclusion of the previous chapter".

=== Verse 1 ===
[a] And Saul was consenting to his death.
[b] On that day a great persecution broke out against the church in Jerusalem. And they were all scattered throughout the regions of Judea and Samaria, except the apostles.

- "Death": from Greek: ἀναίρεσις (anairesis) which can refer to "murder". (Note: See BDAG 64 s.v.; 2 Maccabees 5:13; Josephus, in Antiquities of the Jews, 5.2.12 [5.165].) The English Standard Version refers to Stephen's "execution".

== The church scattered (8:1b–4) ==
The narrative here is focused around two geographical poles: Jerusalem, where the apostles stay (verses 1b, 14) and the "countryside of Judea and Samaria", where the rest of the church is "scattered" (verse 1b), with unnamed disciples continuing the apostles' task of preaching the gospel (verse 4), as the church history moves on to the middle stage of the apostolic commission in Acts 1:8 The story of church's expansion is interwoven with the record of Stephen's burial (verse 2) and the hint of Saul (later "Paul the apostle") future as a zealous instigator of the persecution, indicating that the community most affected by the wave of persecution to follow was the one to which both Stephen and Saul belonged, the 'synagogues of diaspora origin' (8:5–13), because by the time of Acts 9:26 a group of 'disciples' is still in Jerusalem alongside the apostles.

=== Verse 2 ===
And devout men carried Stephen to his burial, and made great lamentation over him.

Heinrich Meyer observes a "double contrast": firstly, that "in spite of the outbreak of persecution which took place on that day, the dead body of the martyr was nevertheless honoured by pious Jews"; and secondly, in verse 3, Saul's persecuting zeal is contrasted with this piety. In the Greek word συγκομίζειν (synekomisan, they carried together), the prefix syn- generally means "with", or "together", suggesting that the men carried Stephen's body away together, but Meyer also emphasises that his body was placed with other dead bodies at a burial-place.

=== Verse 4 ===
Therefore those who were scattered went everywhere preaching the word.

While the apostles remain in Jerusalem, "unnamed disciples exploit their scattered condition to spread the gospel".

== Philip's mission in Samaria (8:4-13) ==
The story of Philip's preaching serves as an example of 'a highly successful work of evangelism, accompanied by miraculous healings which impress the population' (verses 6, 8). The work brings about wonders, 'belief and baptism, i.e. intellectual conviction and entry into a new community', which even impresses a competitor, Simon (Magus) (verse 13), who used to 'bewitch' the Samaritans with sorceries (verses 9,10).

=== Verse 5 ===
Then Philip went down to the city of Samaria, and preached Christ unto them.

- "Philip": is one of the "Seven" (Acts 6:5), not an apostle, and in Acts 21:8, he is characterized as 'the evangelist', settled in Caesarea with four daughters. The connection with a 'we-passage' in Acts 21 suggests the interaction with Philip as a source (directly or indirectly) of this story.
- "Samaria": could refer to the region (as in RSV) or the name of its capital city (as in NRSV), which was rebuilt under Herod the Great.

== The coming of the Spirit in Samaria (8:14–25) ==
This section highlights 'two related issues of church order':

1. The role of the apostles: in a supervisory role to keep an eye on new developments and to perform 'apostolic visitation' (verse 14).
2. Baptism and the Spirit: The sequence of events seems to imply that 'baptism in the name of Jesus' (verse 12, 16) and the reception of the Spirit (verse 15) were 'two distinct events for the Samaritans' and that the Spirit could only come with the laying on of hands by the apostles (verse 17), but this should not be treated as a universal formula, because elsewhere in the book, the Spirit comes before baptism (e.g. 10:44–48), or is not recorded at all (e.g. 8:38).

=== Verse 16 ===
For as yet He had fallen upon none of them. They had only been baptized in the name of the Lord Jesus.

- "Fallen": from Greek: ἐπιπεπτωκός, epipeptōkos, a verb characteristic of Luke, used both in Gospel of Luke and in Acts of 'the occurrence of extraordinary conditions, e.g., the sudden influence of the Spirit', cf. Luke 1:12, Acts 10:44; Acts 11:15; Acts 19:17, cf. Revelation 11:11, (Note: Acts 10:10 cannot be supported, and in Acts 13:11 read ἔπεσεν.) with similar usage in Septuagint, Exodus 15:16, 1 Samuel 26:12, Psalm 54:4, Judith 2:28; Judith 11:11, etc.

== Philip and the Ethiopian (8:26–40) ==
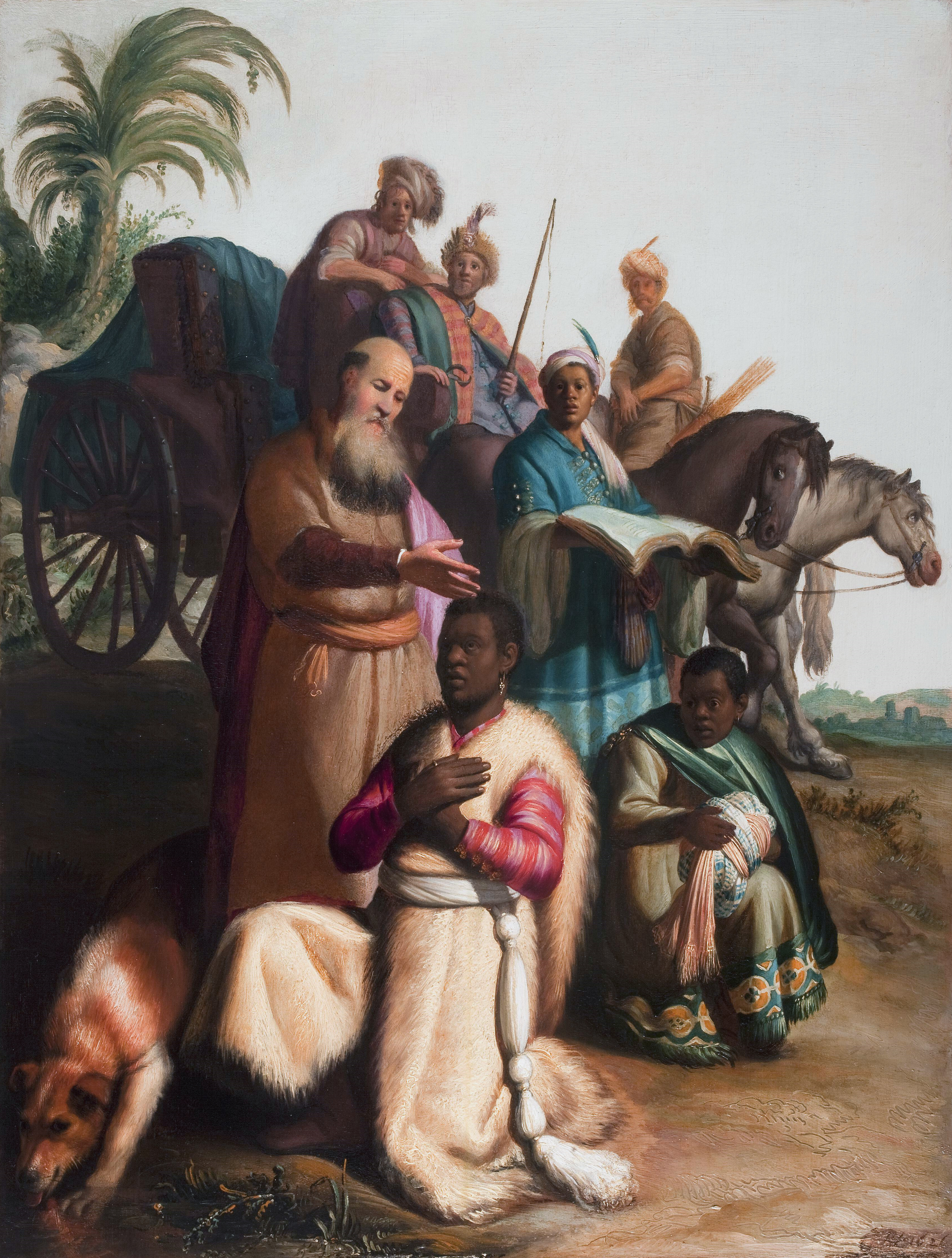
The Baptism of the Eunuch, 1626, Rembrandt

Philip's other significant evangelistic task is to meet an Ethiopian on the way to Gaza (to go back to Ethiopia), following the divine guidance, both angel (verse 26) and Spirit (verse 29, 39). In this part, Luke shows the exact geography of Philip's route: due south from Samaria intersects at Eleutheropolis with the Jerusalem–Gaza road (verse 26: epi means "down to" or "to meet"), and the miraculous timing of the journey: just at that moment kai idou, "and behold", verse 27), Philip's path crosses the route of the Ethiopian pilgrim, heading west to strike the coast road towards Egypt.

=== Verse 26 ===
Now an angel of the Lord said to Philip, "Rise and go toward the south to the road that goes down from Jerusalem to Gaza." This is a desert place.

The Greek κατὰ μεσημβρίαν (kata mesēmbrian) may mean "towards the south" or "at noon". A marginal note in the Revised Version, the text of the Jerusalem Bible, and the Ethiopic text all state "at noon". The paraphrase in the Living Bible suggests that the directive given to Philip was to arrive "about noon".

=== Verse 37 ===
Then Philip said, “If you believe with all your heart, you may.”

And he answered and said, “I believe that Jesus Christ is the Son of God.”

This verse is absent from the majority of the Greek manuscripts, but it is present in some, including E (6th or 7th century). It is cited by Irenaeus (c. 180) and by Cyprian (c. 250), and is found in the Old Latin (2nd/3rd century) and the Vulgate (380–400) translations. In his notes Erasmus says that he took this reading from the margin of 4ap and incorporated it into the Textus Receptus. J. A. Alexander (1857) suggested that this verse, though genuine, was omitted by many scribes, "as unfriendly to the practice of delaying baptism, which had become common, if not prevalent, before the end of the 3rd century."

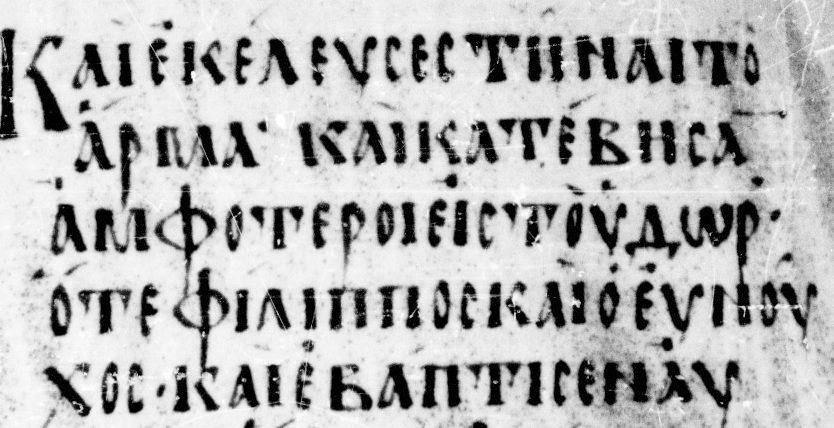
Acts 8:38 on Codex Angelicus (Uncial 020) from the 9th century.

=== Verse 40 ===
But Philip was found at Azotus.
And passing through, he preached in all the cities till he came to Caesarea.

- "Philip was found" — that is, "found himself," "made his appearance": an expression confirming the miraculous manner of his transportation.
- "Azotus": the ancient Ashdod.
- "till he came to Cæsarea" — fifty-five miles northwest of Jerusalem, on the Mediterranean, just south of Mount Carmel; and so named by Herod, who rebuilt it, in honor of Cæsar Augustus.

== See also ==
- Caesarea
- Ethiopia
- Gaza
- Kandake
- Jerusalem
- John the Apostle
- Judea
- Paul of Tarsus
- Philip the Evangelist
- Samaria
- Simon Peter
- Simon the Sorcerer
- Stephen
- Related Bible parts: Isaiah 20, Isaiah 53, Acts 6, Acts 7, Acts 21

== Sources ==
- Alexander, Loveday (2007). "62. Acts". In Barton, John; Muddiman, John (eds.). The Oxford Bible Commentary (first (paperback) ed.). Oxford University Press. pp. 1028–1061. ISBN 978-0199277186.
