= Acts 5 =

- ← chapter 4 chapter 6 →
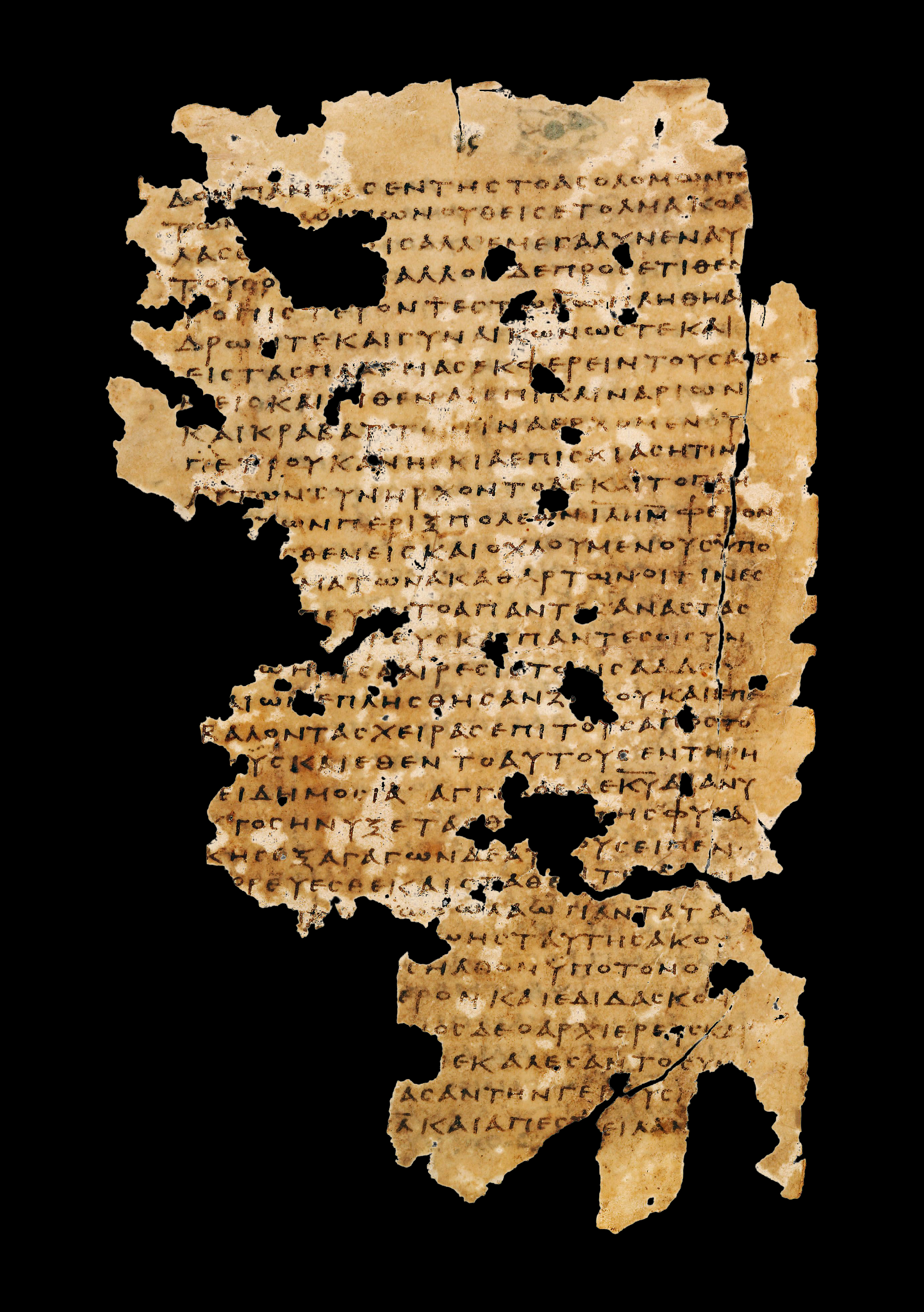
- Acts 5:12–21 in Uncial 0189, written about AD 200.
- Book: Acts of the Apostles
- Category: Church history
- Christian Bible part: New Testament
- Order in the Christian part: 5

Acts 5 is the fifth chapter of the Acts of the Apostles in the New Testament of the Christian Bible. It records the growth of the early church and the obstacles it encountered. Early Christian tradition affirmed that Luke composed this book as well as the Gospel of Luke. Critical opinion on the tradition was evenly divided at the end of the 20th century. The contents of this chapter include the history of Ananias and Sapphira, an account of the miraculous power and dignity of the Apostles, their imprisonment and liberation, examination before the Sanhedrin, and scourging, and finally Gamaliel's advice to the Sanhedrin.

== Text ==
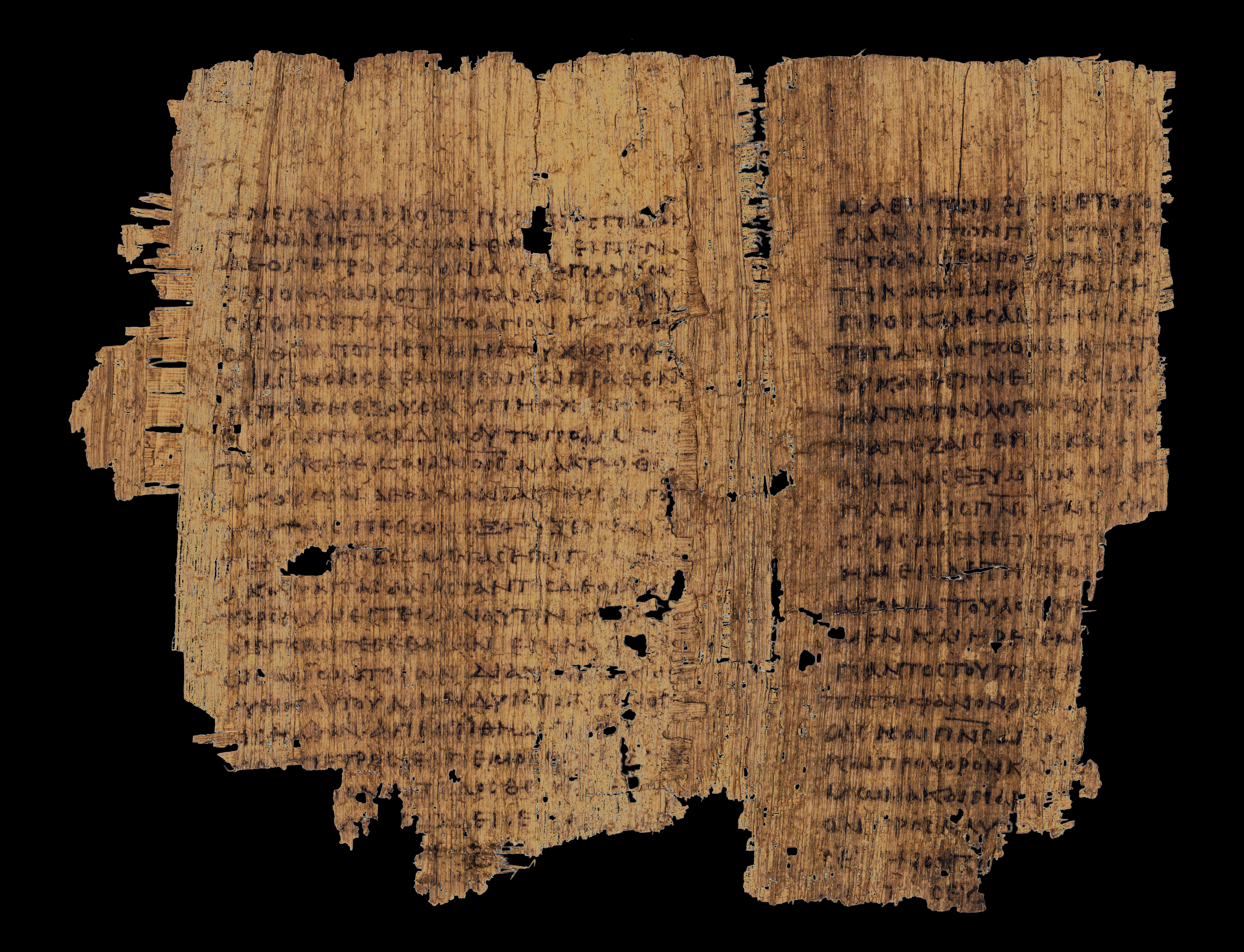
Acts 5:2–9; 6:1-6 on the verso side of Papyrus 8 (4th century).

The original text was written in Koine Greek. This chapter is divided into 42 verses.

=== Textual witnesses ===
Some early manuscripts containing the text of this chapter are:

- Uncial 0189 (~AD 200)
- Codex Vaticanus (325–350)
- Codex Sinaiticus (330–360)
- Papyrus 8 (4th century; extant verses 2–9)
- Papyrus 57 (4th century; extant verses 1–2, 8–10)
- Codex Bezae (~400)
- Codex Alexandrinus (400–440)
- Codex Ephraemi Rescriptus (~450; extant verses 35–42)
- Codex Laudianus (~550).

=== New Testament references ===
- Acts 5:28: Acts 5:18.

== Ananias and Sapphira (verses 1–11) ==
The narrative underlines the authority of Peter, who could see through the deception by Ananias and Sapphira (verses 3–5, 8–9) and highlights the spiritual authority of the "church" (Greek: ekklesia, first used in Acts in verse 11) in form of 'signs' of God (inducing 'great fear' in verses 5 and 11, as well as healing miracles in the next section). The sin of the couple was not simply the dishonesty on monetary value of the land sale, but rather the conspiracy to deceive the community (Greek: koinonia), which is a 'symptom of a more serious failure to be "of one mind" within the community' (cf. Ephesians 4:25; Colossians 3:9), that is, lying to the community equals to 'lying to God' (verse 4) and 'tempting the Holy Spirit' (verse 9; cf. Philippians 2:1-2 and 2 Corinthians 13:14).

Henry Alford observes that the deaths of Ananias (verse 5) and Sapphira (verse 10) "were beyond question supernaturally inflicted by Peter, speaking in the power of the Holy Spirit". He argues that "this is the only honest interpretation of the incident" and that attempts to attribute their deaths to "natural causes" such as "their horror at detection, and ... the solemn words of Peter" are not viable.

== Signs and wonders (verses 12–16) ==
This section summarizes the "ongoing healing ministry of the apostles", which increases the reputation of the believers of Christ among "the people" (verse 13).

=== Verse 13 ===
None of the rest dared join them, but the people held them in high esteem.

"The rest" cannot refer to a distinction between the apostles and other believers, because verse 14 renews the author's account of how many people were coming to believe and to join the community of believers. It must therefore refer to a people who were "impressed" by the ministry of the apostles but did not become "believers". J. Rawson Lumby sees the believing community being granted space to meet in the Portico of Solomon without outside intrusion.

The bringing out of the sick for healing in public is a manifestation of 'belief (verse 15) which recalls the popularity of Jesus' healing ministry (cf. Luke 4:40-1, 6:18-19). The healing power coming out of Peter is so wonderful that it does not need even to touch him (verse 15: cf. Luke 7:1–10; 8:43).

== Arrest and escape (verses 17–26) ==
In the previous chapter, the apostles received a 'blanket prohibition on teaching in the name of Jesus', which they disdainfully rejected (Acts 4:19). Then, before long, the authority arrested and placed the whole apostolic group in jail (verse 18). The apostles were soon miraculously released by an 'angel of the Lord', who instructed them to continue preaching in the temple (verses 19–21).

== The trial of the apostles (verses 27–32) ==
This trial is 'essentially a reprise' of the previous one (Acts 4), with the charge of 'direct disobedience of an explicit instruction' (verse 28). Peter spoke on behalf of the apostles that they have to obey God, and were not 'bound by any human court' (verse 29). This was followed by a summary of previous sermon points: Jesus has been killed by the authority who 'hanged him on a tree' (verse 30; referring to Deuteronomy 21:22–23; cf. Acts 10:39; also in Paul's epistle, Galatians 3:13), but raised and exalted by God to a position on his 'right hand', as a 'precondition for the outpouring of [spiritual] gifts' of 'repentance and forgiveness of sins now offered to Israel' (verses 31–32).

=== Verse 29 ===
But Peter and the other apostles answered and said: "We ought to obey God rather than men."

- "Ought to obey God rather than men": similar assertion as spoken by Peter and John in Acts 4:19–20, but here has a new significance in relation to the command of the angel in Acts 5:20.

== The advice of Gamaliel (verses 33–39) ==
Rabban Gamaliel the Elder was one of the great Pharisaic teachers of the first century (flourished c. 25–50 CE) and is later said to have been the teacher of Paul (Acts 22:3). As a member of the Sanhedrin he began to question the wisdom of pursuing the case, which would be the main theme of the whole account: 'to recognize where God is at work'. The examples he cited — Theudas and Judas of Galilee — are both mentioned in the same order by a first-century historian, Josephus (Ant. 20.97–98, 102); but assigned to different time periods, with Judas linked to the time of the Roman census of Judea (cf. Luke 2:1-2) and Theudas dated by Josephus to procuratorship of Fadus (44–46 CE), which would happen after the account in this chapter. The dating aspect is debated with arguments in favor of Luke or of Josephus, or the possibility of different Theudas and Judas.

=== Verse 34 ===
Then one in the council stood up, a Pharisee named Gamaliel, a teacher of the law held in respect by all the people, and commanded them to put the apostles outside for a little while.

As Luke had mentioned (Acts 4:1; Acts 5:7) that there was an influential party of Sadducees in the Sanhedrin, it is specifically noted here that Gamaliel was a Pharisee, who was well-respected to provide balancing opinions to the counsels of the Sadducean members, especially regarding the Resurrection (cf. Acts 23:6–8). Gamaliel is known in the Talmud as "Rabban Gamaliel the Elder" (to distinguish him from his grandson of the same name, "Gamaliel the Younger"), the grandson of Hillel the Elder, the head of the school of Hillel, at some time president of the Sanhedrin, one of the most famous Jewish doctors (the title Rabban is given to only six others), and one whose greatness would be as a shield to his students (Acts 22:3).

== Summary and transition (verses 40-42) ==
Following Gamaliel's advice, the Sanhedrin treated the apostles with caution, but nonetheless sentenced them to flogging (verse 40). The punishment was received by apostles with 'joy' (verse 41) as they considered it 'worthy to be dishonored for the Name' as martyrs. The section concludes with an assurance that 'the gospel message is assiduously proclaimed, not only in the temple but from house to house'.

=== Verse 42 ===
And daily in the temple, and in every house, they did not cease teaching and preaching Jesus as the Christ.

- "Daily": translated from the Greek phrase πᾶσάν ἡμέραν, pasan hēmeran, "each/every/all days", comparable to καθ’ ἡμέραν, kath’ hēmeran, "day by day", in Acts 2:46.
- "Preaching": literally to "evangelize," (Greek: εὐαγγελιζόμενοι, euangelizomenoi) as in Acts 8:4; Acts 8:12; Acts 8:25; Romans 10:15, etc. The temple and private houses are 'two fields of labour' to teach and preach.

== See also ==
- Ananias and Sapphira
- Gamaliel
- Jerusalem
- Sanhedrin
- Simon Peter
- Related Bible parts: Acts 2, Acts 22

== Sources ==
- Alexander, Loveday (2007). "62. Acts". In Barton, John; Muddiman, John (eds.). The Oxford Bible Commentary (first (paperback) ed.). Oxford University Press. pp. 1028–1061. ISBN 978-0199277186.
- Coogan, Michael David (2007). Coogan, Michael David; Brettler, Marc Zvi; Newsom, Carol Ann; Perkins, Pheme (eds.). The New Oxford Annotated Bible with the Apocryphal/Deuterocanonical Books: New Revised Standard Version, Issue 48 (Augmented 3rd ed.). Oxford University Press. ISBN 9780195288810.
