= Paris Reidhead =

American Christian missionary

Paris Reidhead (May 30, 1919 - March 23, 1992) was a Christian missionary, teacher, writer, and advocate of economic development in impoverished nations.

== Life and career ==
Reidhead was born in a Minnesota farming community in 1919. When in his late teens, he committed himself to a life of Christian service.

In 1945, Reidhead took an assignment with the Sudan Interior Mission (SIM), surveying and analyzing indigenous languages in preparation for evangelistic and educational efforts near the Sudan-Ethiopia border. His proficiency in tribal languages was noted by his contemporaries. Reidhead's experiences in Sudan deeply impacted the core values that would later guide his life.

A spiritual crisis during this period - as he described two decades later in what is probably his best-known recorded teaching, "Ten Shekels and a Shirt" - left Reidhead with the conviction that much of evangelicalism had adopted utilitarian and humanistic philosophies contradictory to Biblical teaching. The end of all being, he came to believe, was not the happiness of man, but the glorification of God. This theme would recur throughout his later teaching.

Upon his return to the United States in 1949, Reidhead was appointed Deputation Secretary of the SIM. He associated himself with the Christian and Missionary Alliance movement and in 1953 began teaching at national conferences. Three years later he took a position as pastor at New York City's Gospel Tabernacle, which had been established in 1887 by A. B. Simpson. While in New York, he drew on informational resources at the United Nations to pioneer a program through which government and private funds were used for economic development in the Third World. His efforts to implement local programs on this model took him to mission fields in Africa, Asia, and South America.

Reidhead's involvement with the Sudanese also inspired him to seek a means to enable impoverished people in developing nations to help themselves and their families rise out of poverty. Third World development became his full-time commitment in 1966. His vision of public-private funding for economic development led, in 1971, to the formation of the Institute for International Development which has served as the model for about 90 evangelical organizations. In 1985, he helped found Enterprise Development International (EDI), a nonprofit Christian faith-based organization that works in partnership with local Christian groups to transfer the necessary training and capital to help entrepreneurs start sustainable family businesses.

Paris Reidhead died in Woodbridge, Virginia in 1992. He was married to Marjorie and they had a daughter Virginia; Marjorie and Virginia continued the work of the Bible Teaching Ministries after Paris's death.

== Books by Paris Reidhead ==
- Beyond Petition; Six Steps to Successful Praying. Minneapolis: Dimension Books, 1974.
- Beyond Believing. Minneapolis: Bethany Fellowship, 1976.
- Evidences of Eternal Life, 1988
- Finding the Reality of God, 1989
- Getting Evangelicals Saved. Minneapolis: Bethany House Publishers, 1989.
