= Acts 7 =

- ← chapter 6 chapter 8 →
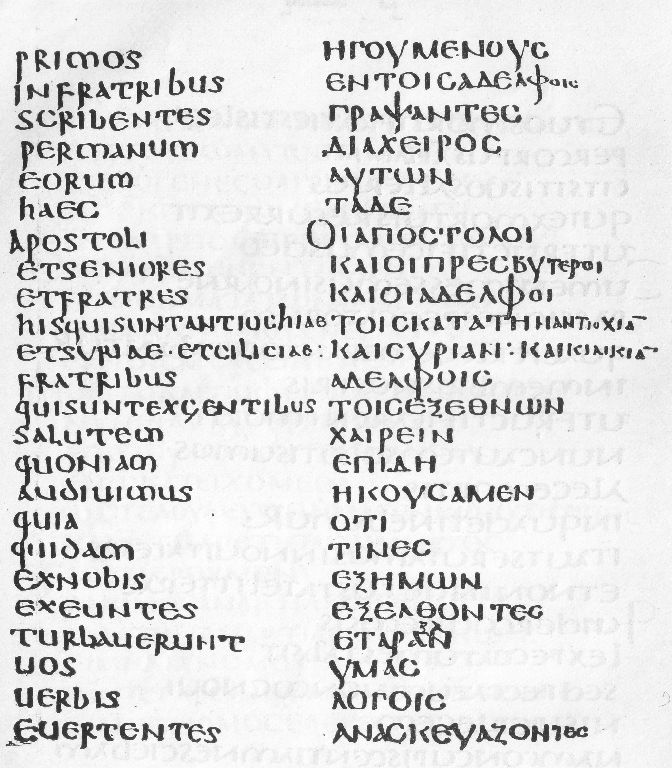
- Acts 15:22–24 in Latin (left column) and Greek (right column) in Codex Laudianus, written about AD 550.
- Book: Acts of the Apostles
- Category: Church history
- Christian Bible part: New Testament
- Order in the Christian part: 5

Acts 7 is the seventh chapter of the Acts of the Apostles in the New Testament of the Christian Bible. It records the address of Stephen before the Sanhedrin and his execution outside Jerusalem, and introduces Saul (who later became Paul the Apostle). Early Christian tradition uniformly affirmed that Luke composed this book as well as the Gospel of Luke. Critical opinion on the tradition was evenly divided at the end of the 20th century.

== Text ==
The original text was written in Koine Greek. This chapter is divided into 60 verses.

=== Textual witnesses ===
Some early manuscripts containing the text of this chapter are:

In Greek

- Codex Vaticanus (AD 325–350)
- Codex Sinaiticus (330–360)
- Codex Bezae (~400)
- Codex Alexandrinus (400–440)
- Codex Ephraemi Rescriptus (~450)
- Codex Laudianus (~550)
- Papyrus 33 (~550)

In Latin

- León palimpsest (7th century; extant verses 27–60)

== Stephen's speech (7:1–53) ==
On the surface, Stephen's speech seemingly had little connection with the charges against him, that he spoke "blasphemous words against Moses and God", but the recorded words apparently are a part of a "larger polemical discourse, building on and developing the arguments already put forward in the sermons and trial speeches of the apostles". Alexander suggests that it forms a "rewritten Bible": "a selective retelling of biblical history from a particular theological standpoint", in a similar form to Psalm 105, among others in the Hebrew Bible, in intertestamental literature and in Hebrews 11.

There are parallels between Stephen's speech and the following biblical texts:

- Acts 7:3: Genesis 12:1
- Acts 7:7: Genesis 15:14; Exodus 3:12
- Acts 7:8: Genesis 17:9, Genesis 21:3 and Genesis 25:26
- Acts 7:9: Genesis 29:31 and Genesis 37:28
- Acts 7:10: Genesis 41:37
- Acts 7:12: Genesis 42:1
- Acts 7:13: Genesis 45:4
- Acts 7:14: Exodus 1:5
- Acts 7:15: Genesis 46:5
- Acts 7:16: Genesis 49:33
- Acts 7:20: Exodus 2:2
- Acts 7:24: Exodus 2:11
- Acts 7:26: Exodus 2:13
- Acts 7:28: Exodus 2:14
- Acts 7:30: Exodus 3:2
- Acts 7:32: Exodus 3:6,15
- Acts 7:34: Exodus 3:5,7,8,10
- Acts 7:35: Exodus 2:14
- Acts 7:36: Exodus 7:9 and Exodus 16:1
- Acts 7:37: Deuteronomy 18:15
- Acts 7:38: Exodus 19:3
- Acts 7:40: Exodus 32:1,23
- Acts 7:43: Amos 5:25–27
- Acts 7:46: Psalm 132:5
- Acts 7:47: 1 Chronicles 17:12
- Acts 7:48: Acts 17:24
- Acts 7:49–50: Isaiah 66:1–2

=== Verse 16 ===
This verse has been studied extensively by theologians because the speech of Stephen seems to contradict the account in Genesis:

- Stephen: and they were carried back to Shechem and laid in the tomb that Abraham had bought for a sum of silver from the sons of Hamor in Shechem.
- Genesis 50:13: ... and [they] buried him in the cave of the field at Machpelah, to the east of Mamre, which Abraham bought with the field from Ephron the Hittite to possess as a burying place.

== Stephen's death (7:54–60) ==
The reaction of the audience to Stephen's speech reached a dramatic high point in verse 54 and heightened even further Stephen's description of his vision in verses 55–56. Stephen's vision of God's glory has a continuity with his speech on Abraham (7:2) and Moses (cf. Exodus 33:18—23), but now extends to the open heaven (verse 56) with the figure of Jesus himself positioned 'at the right hand of God' (verse 55) denoting the highest place of honor and confirming Stephen's claim that the rejected savior is in fact God's 'Righteous One'. Stephen as 'the prototype for Christian martyrdom' dies 'calling on the name of the Lord' expecting the exalted Jesus to receive his spirit (verse 59) and then cries out 'in a loud voice' (verse 60; cf. Luke 23:46) for forgiveness that echoes the prayer of Luke 23:34.

=== Verse 55 ===
But he, being full of the Holy Ghost, looked up stedfastly into heaven, and saw the glory of God, and Jesus standing on the right hand of God,

- "Jesus standing on right hand of God": The 'standing' Jesus (rather than 'seated') 'probably indicates his rising to receive' Stephen; this phrase is a variation on Psalm 110:1.

=== Verse 58 ===
and they cast him out of the city and stoned him. And the witnesses laid down their clothes at the feet of a young man named Saul.

- "Cast him out of the city": This action recalls the commandment of Leviticus 24:14, 23:

Take the blasphemer outside the camp ... and they took the blasphemer outside the camp, and stoned him to death.

=== Verse 59 ===
And they stoned Stephen as he was calling on God and saying, "Lord Jesus, receive my spirit."

The Pulpit Commentary notes Stephen's words in Acts 7:59 as a 'striking acknowledgment of the divinity of Christ: only he who gave the spirit could receive it back again'.

In the account of Stephen’s martyrdom in Acts attributed to Luke, Luke presents a striking parallel to Jesus’ crucifixion words of the cross in Luke’s gospel. As Stephen is being stoned, he cries out, “Lord, do not hold this sin against them” Acts 7:60, echoing Jesus’ plea, “Father, forgive them, for they know not what they do” Luke 23:34. Likewise, Stephen’s final words, “Lord Jesus, receive my spirit”, mirror Jesus’ “Father, into your hands I commit my spirit” Luke 23:46. But unlike Jesus, Stephen directs both statements—not to the Father—but to Jesus himself, underscoring his vision of the risen Christ standing at the right hand of God.

=== Verse 60 ===
Then he knelt down and cried out with a loud voice, "Lord, do not charge them with this sin." And when he had said this, he fell asleep.

Alexander Maclaren has noted that this verse contains "the only narrative in the New Testament of a Christian martyrdom or death".

The prayers “Forgive them, for they do not know what they are doing” and “Into Your hands I commit My spirit,” were addressed to the Father in Luke’s Gospel, are now echoed by Stephen in Acts also said to be written by Luke—but now directed to Jesus. This narrative shift signals an early Christian conviction that Jesus, risen and exalted, is not only Messiah but also the divine recipient of prayer and ultimate trust. As New Testament scholar F.F. Bruce notes, “The appeal is made to Jesus, not to God, showing that the exalted Christ occupies the place which God occupied in earlier Jewish martyrdom stories.” Stephen’s final words, while consciously patterned after Jesus’ own, would be consistent with the church’s growing Trinitarian faith, in which Jesus is not only the example of faithful suffering but also the one to whom believers entrust their spirits—and their forgiveness.

== Uses ==
The phrase "Living oracles" or "Living words", taken from Acts 7:38, appears in Greek on the heraldric seal of Columbia University, printed on the book held in the central figure's hand, and signifying the passing down of knowledge.

== See also ==
- Abraham
- Burning Bush
- Jacob
- Joseph (son of Jacob)
- Moses
- Sanhedrin
- Saint Stephen
- Related Bible parts: Book of Genesis, Book of Exodus, Book of Deuteronomy, Luke 23, Acts 6, Acts 8, Acts 21

== Sources ==
- Alexander, Loveday (2007). "62. Acts". In Barton, John; Muddiman, John (eds.). The Oxford Bible Commentary (first (paperback) ed.). Oxford University Press. pp. 1028–1061. ISBN 978-0199277186.
