= Acts 4 =

- ← chapter 3 chapter 5 →
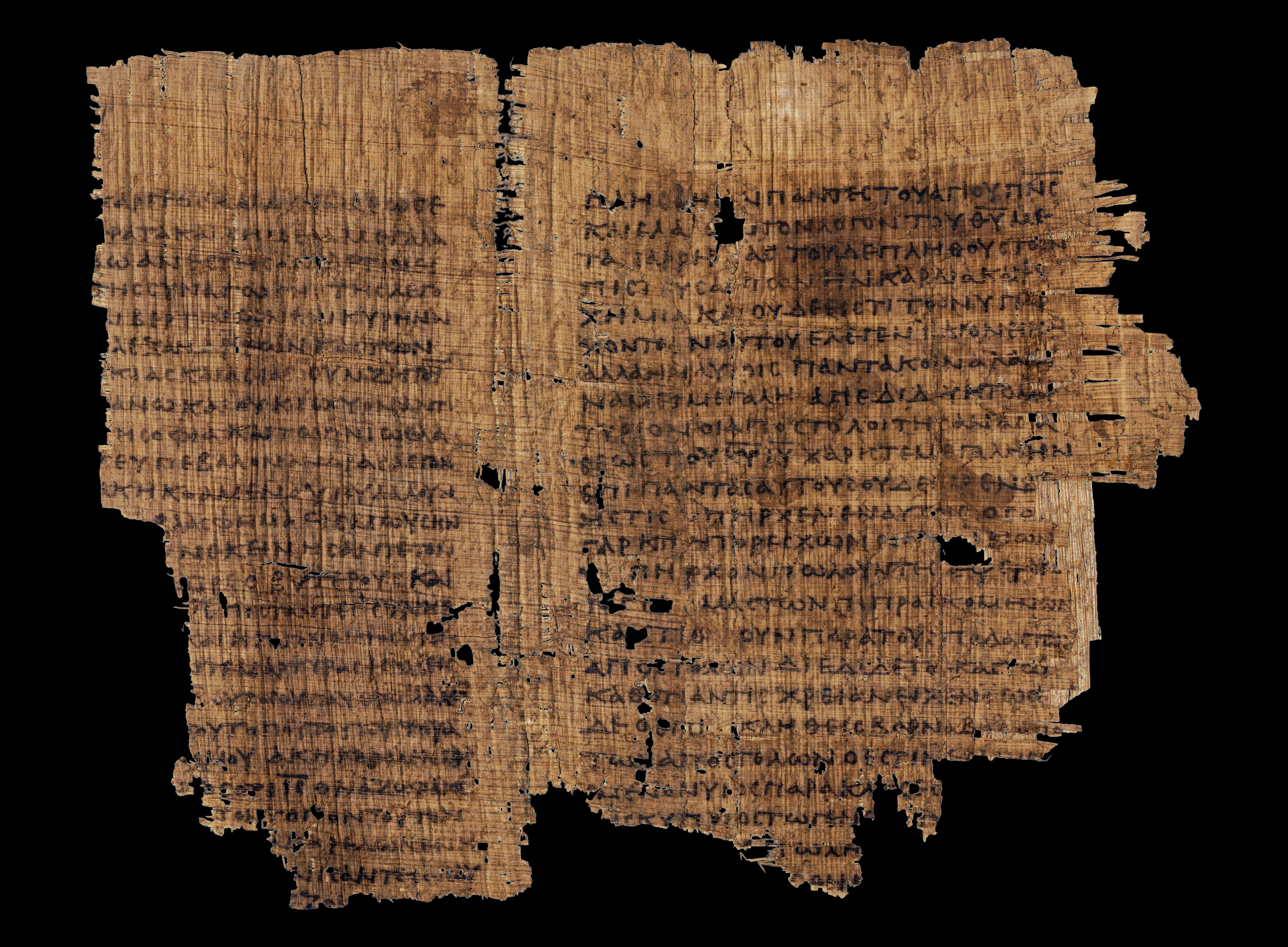
- Acts 4:31–37; 6:8-15 on the recto side of Papyrus 8 (4th century).
- Book: Acts of the Apostles
- Category: Church history
- Christian Bible part: New Testament
- Order in the Christian part: 5

Acts 4 is the fourth chapter of the Acts of the Apostles in the New Testament of the Christian Bible. Early Christian tradition affirmed that Luke composed this book as well as the Gospel of Luke. Critical opinion on the tradition was evenly divided at the end of the 20th century. This chapter records the Sanhedrin's arrest and subsequent release of the apostles in the aftermath of a healing by Simon Peter and his preaching in Solomon's Portico in the Temple in Jerusalem.

== Text ==
The original text was written in Koine Greek. This chapter is divided into 37 verses.

=== Textual witnesses ===
Some early manuscripts containing the text of this chapter are:

- Codex Vaticanus (AD 325–350)
- Codex Sinaiticus (330–360)
- Papyrus 8 (4th century; extant verses 31–37)
- Codex Bezae (~400)
- Codex Alexandrinus (400–440)
- Codex Ephraemi Rescriptus (~450; extant verses 1–2)
- Codex Laudianus (~550)

=== Old Testament references ===
- Acts 4:11: Psalm 118:22
- Acts 4:24: Psalm 146:6
- Acts 4:25: Psalm 1:1
- Acts 4:26: Psalm 2:1,2

=== New Testament references ===
- Acts 4:11: Matthew 21:42; Mark 12:10; Luke 20:17; 1 Peter 2:7

== Conflicting reactions (verses 1–4) ==
Peter's speech (Acts 3) was interrupted by the temple authorities who come to silence the apostles, but behind the scenes, more people join the church.

=== Verse 1 ===
Now as they spoke to the people, the priests, the captain of the temple, and the Sadducees came upon them.

The suddenness of the arrival of this group of officials is noted by Heinrich Meyer, and in "The Voice" translation (2012): Suddenly, the head of the temple police and some members of the Sadducean party interrupted Peter and John. The priests were those of the temple guard: a strict watch was maintained over the temple by three priests and 21 Levites, whose activities were overseen by the captain of the guard. The Westcott-Hort Greek text refers instead to "the chief priests" (οι αρχιερεις, hoi archiereis). Meyer notes and criticises the view put forward by Bishop Lightfoot and others that the commander of the Roman garrison is referred to in this passage.

=== Verse 3 ===
They seized Peter and John and, because it was evening, they put them in jail until the next day.

The approach of evening follows from Acts 3:1, which states that the apostles were entering the temple at "the hour of prayer": three o'clock in the afternoon.

=== Verse 4 ===
But many of the people who heard their message believed it, so that the number of believers now reached a new high of about five thousand men!

Luke's estimate in Acts 2:41 was that 3,000 were baptised in response to Peter's Pentecost sermon, so an addititonal 2,000 men would appear to be indicated here. The Expanded Bible notes that men probably refers "to adult males and so household units". Wilhelm de Wette includes women within the 5,000. Robert Witham treats the 5,000 as a measure of the additional conversions that day, rather than a cumulative total.

== Arrest and trial (verses 5–12) ==
The apostles spent a night in jail (verse 5) and were brought before a full session of the Sanhedrin the next morning.

=== Verse 10 ===
[Simon Peter said]: "let it be known to you all, and to all the people of Israel, that by the name of Jesus Christ of Nazareth, whom you crucified, whom God raised from the dead, by Him this man stands here before you whole."

Peter replies to the question of the council (verse 7) on the origin of the healing power by identifying it with Jesus Christ of Nazareth.

=== Verse 11 ===
[Simon Peter said]: This is the ‘stone which was rejected by you builders, which has become the chief cornerstone.’

Citing Psalm 118:22.

=== Verse 12 ===
[Simon Peter said]: "Nor is there salvation in any other, for there is no other name under heaven given among men by which we must be saved."

In his last sentence, Peter "goes further than anything he has yet said: Christ is the only mean of salvation."

== Deliberation of the council (verses 13–22) ==
Here Luke gives a glimpse of "the inner workings of the Sanhedrin", especially their elitist perspective: they perceive the apostles in verse 13 to be "uneducated and untrained men". This may not mean that they were totally illiterate, but that they lacked the level of education shared by the elders and the scribes. Alexander refers to the Sanhedrin's "'us' and 'them' attitude [towards] 'the people'" seen in verses 16, 17, and 21.

== A prophetic prayer (verses 23–31) ==
This section gives a glimpse of "the apostolic circle at prayer", and this particular prayer provides a "theological framework" for "legitimate exercise of free speech in the face of a tyrannical abuse of authority" (verse 29).

== Common church life (verses 32–37) ==
As a slightly more detailed account than in 2:44-45, this section notes how money raised from the property sale was "channelled through the apostles" (verse 35) to emphasize "the sense of centralized authority".

=== Verses 32–35 ===
^{32} All the believers were one in heart and mind. No one claimed that any of their possessions was their own, but they shared everything they had. ^{33} With great power the apostles continued to testify to the resurrection of the Lord Jesus. And God's grace was so powerfully at work in them all ^{34}that there were no needy persons among them. For from time to time those who owned land or houses sold them, brought the money from the sales ^{35} and put it at the apostles' feet, and it was distributed to anyone who had need.

Pope Leo XIV sees the establishment of mendicant religious orders such as the Franciscans, Dominicans, Augustinians and Carmelites in the thirteenth century as "an evangelical revolution ... reviving the experience of the first Christian community" as recounted in this passage.

=== Verses 36–37 ===
^{36}And Joses, who was also named Barnabas by the apostles (which is translated Son of Encouragement), a Levite of the country of Cyprus, ^{37}having land, sold it, and brought the money and laid it at the apostles' feet.

- "Barnabas" would later play an important role in the early ministry of Apostle Paul (Acts 9:26–30; Acts 11), and, "with typically Lukan economy" of literary device, is introduced here as a character who displays "a positive example of the ideal use of wealth".
- "Son of Encouragement": The Greek: υἱὸς παρακλήσεως, romanized: hyios paraklēseōs, can also mean "son of consolation". One theory is that this is from the Aramaic בר נחמה, bar neḥmā, meaning 'son (of) consolation'. Another is that it is related to the Hebrew word nabī (נביא, Imperial Aramaic: nebī) meaning "prophet". In the Syriac Bible, the phrase "son of consolation" is translated bara dbuya'a.

== See also ==
- Barnabas
- Christian socialism
  - Christian communism
- From each according to his ability, to each according to his needs
- Jerusalem
- John the Apostle
- Sanhedrin
- Simon Peter
- Solomon
- Related Bible parts: Psalm 2, Psalm 118, Acts 2, Acts 11

== Sources ==
- Alexander, Loveday (2007). "62. Acts". In Barton, John; Muddiman, John (eds.). The Oxford Bible Commentary (first (paperback) ed.). Oxford University Press. pp. 1028–1061. ISBN 978-0199277186.
- Coogan, Michael David (2007). Coogan, Michael David; Brettler, Marc Zvi; Newsom, Carol Ann; Perkins, Pheme (eds.). The New Oxford Annotated Bible with the Apocryphal/Deuterocanonical Books: New Revised Standard Version, Issue 48 (Augmented 3rd ed.). Oxford University Press. ISBN 9780195288810.
- Kirkpatrick, A. F. (1901). The Book of Psalms: with Introduction and Notes. Cambridge: The University Press.
