= Acts 6 =

- ← chapter 5 chapter 7 →
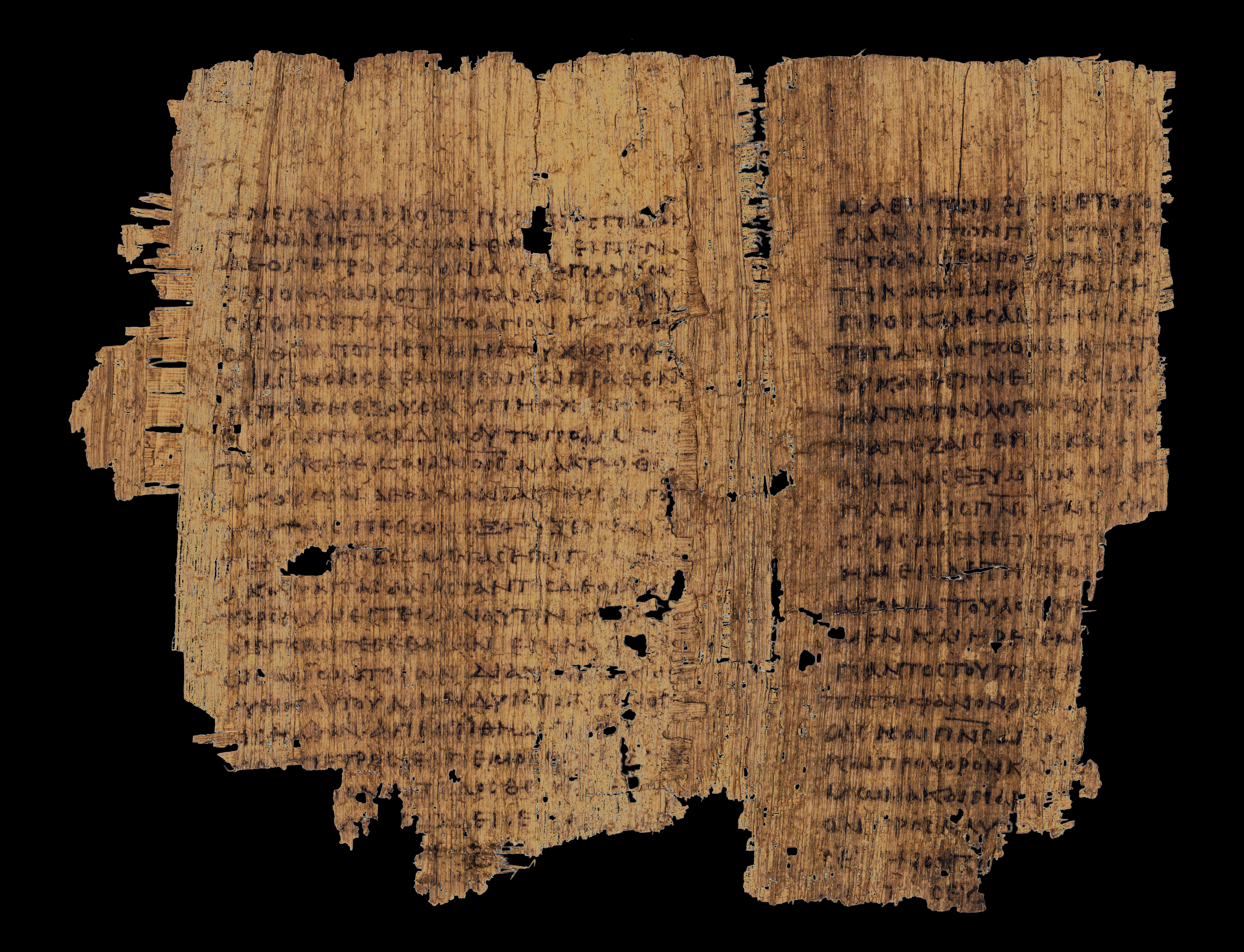
- Acts 5:2–9; 6:1-6 on the verso side of Papyrus 8 (4th century).
- Book: Acts of the Apostles
- Category: Church history
- Christian Bible part: New Testament
- Order in the Christian part: 5

Acts 6 is the sixth chapter of the Acts of the Apostles in the New Testament of the Christian Bible. It records the institution of the first seven deacons, and the work of one of them, Stephen. Early Christian tradition uniformly affirmed that Luke composed this book as well as the Gospel of Luke, while scholarly opinion on the tradition was evenly divided at the end of the 20th century. Joseph T. Lienhard refers to a "Stephen cycle" evident in the deliberate connection between the institution of the seven and the narrative about Stephen in this chapter and chapter 7.

== Text ==
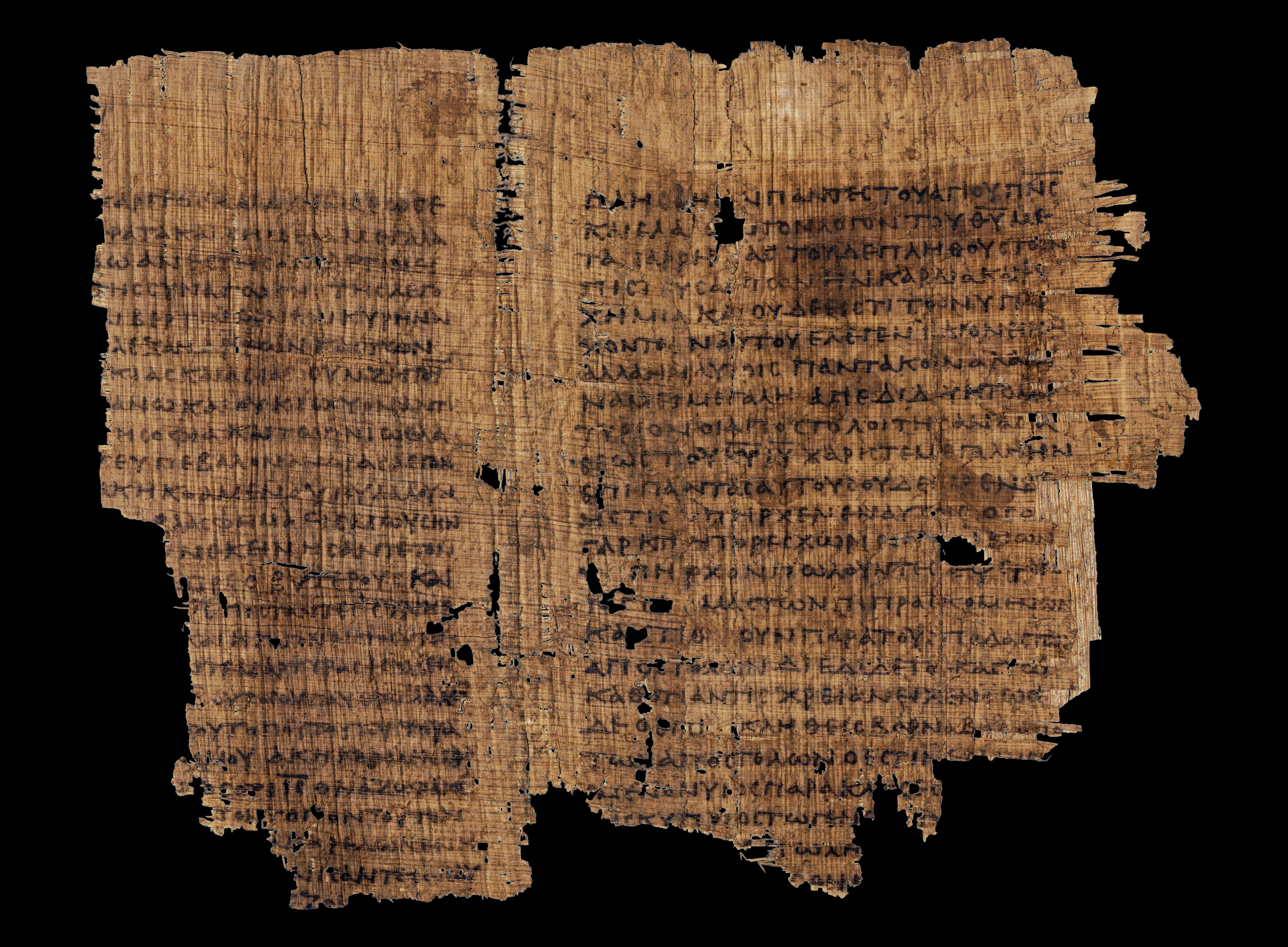
Acts 4:31–37; 6:8-15 on the recto side of Papyrus 8 (4th century).

The original text was written in Koine Greek. This chapter is divided into 15 verses. In terms of the number of verses, this is the shortest chapter in the Acts of the Apostles.

=== Textual witnesses ===
Some early manuscripts containing the text of this chapter are:

- Codex Vaticanus (AD 325–350)
- Codex Sinaiticus (330–360)
- Papyrus 8 (4th century; extant verses 1–6, 8–15)
- Codex Bezae (~400)
- Codex Alexandrinus (400–440)
- Codex Ephraemi Rescriptus (~450; lacunae: verse 8)
- Codex Laudianus (~550)

== Appointment of the Seven (verses 1–7) ==
In this section, Luke provides "a tantalizingly brief glimpse into the inner workings of the church", combined with "two summary verses" (5:42 and 6:7). The candidates to perform the ministerial functions within the growing "company of believers" were marked out as "full of the Spirit" (verses 3, 5). The "transmission of authority from the apostles" is "very deliberately assured through prayer and the laying on of hands" (verse 6).

=== Verse 1 ===
Now about this time, when the number of disciples was increasing, a complaint was made by the Hellenists (Greek-speaking Jews) against the native Hebrews, because their widows were being overlooked in the daily serving of food.

The distinction made here concerns those Jews joining the community of believers who had been born outside the Holy Land, who spoke the Greek language and had adopted much of the ancient Greek culture, and the native-born Jews who spoke Hebrew and/or Aramaic and lived according to Jewish custom.

=== Verse 5 ===
And the saying pleased the whole multitude. And they chose Stephen, a man full of faith and the Holy Spirit, and Philip, Prochorus, Nicanor, Timon, Parmenas, and Nicolas, a proselyte from Antioch,

All the selected seven men have Greek names, suggesting a "diaspora connection", although many Palestinian Jews at the time also spoke Greek.

=== Verse 7 ===
And the word of God continued to increase, and the number of the disciples multiplied greatly in Jerusalem, and a great many of the priests became obedient to the faith.

E. H. Plumptre considers the conversion of "a great company of priests" to be "in every way significant". There were no priests named among Jesus' disciples in the gospels, nor any references to priests among the group of believers reported as "attending the temple together" each day in Acts 2:46. Plumptre suggests that "their profession of the new faith did not necessarily involve the immediate abandonment of their official function". The high priest questions Stephen in Acts 7:1, and is therefore not likely to have been one of the converted priests.

== Stephen on trial (Acts 6:8–7:1) ==
One of the seven, Stephen, soon finds himself in dispute, not with the temple hierarchy, but with members of a group of diaspora synagogues in Jerusalem (6:9).

=== Verse 9 ===
Then there arose some from what is called the Synagogue of the Freedmen (Cyrenians, Alexandrians, and those from Cilicia and Asia), disputing with Stephen.

- "Synagogue of the Freedmen" (KJV: "synagogue of the Libertines"): A particular synagogue in Jerusalem which is attended by former slaves, or "freemen", and may include their descendants. The word "Freedmen" or ""libertine" is from a Latin title libertini indicating "a group of Jews of Italian origin who were now settled in Jerusalem" and this term is also known from Latin sources, such as Tacitus, Annals, 2:85. The Theodotus inscription provides the evidence that 'there was at least one Greek-speaking synagogue in Jerusalem in the first century'.

=== Verse 14 ===
[False witnesses from the Synagogue of the Freedmen said]: "for we have heard him say that this Jesus of Nazareth will destroy this place and change the customs which Moses delivered to us."

- "This Jesus of Nazareth shall destroy this place": The words of the accusation may come in part from John 2:19, partly on the prediction in Matthew 24:2, which 'Stephen must have known, and may well have reproduced'.

== See also ==
- Philip the Evangelist
- Sanhedrin
- Saint Stephen
- Other related Bible parts: Acts 7, Acts 8, Acts 21

== Sources ==
- Alexander, Loveday (2007). "62. Acts". In Barton, John; Muddiman, John (eds.). The Oxford Bible Commentary (first (paperback) ed.). Oxford University Press. pp. 1028–1061. ISBN 978-0199277186.
