= Azal (Bible) =

Location mentioned in the Book of Zechariah

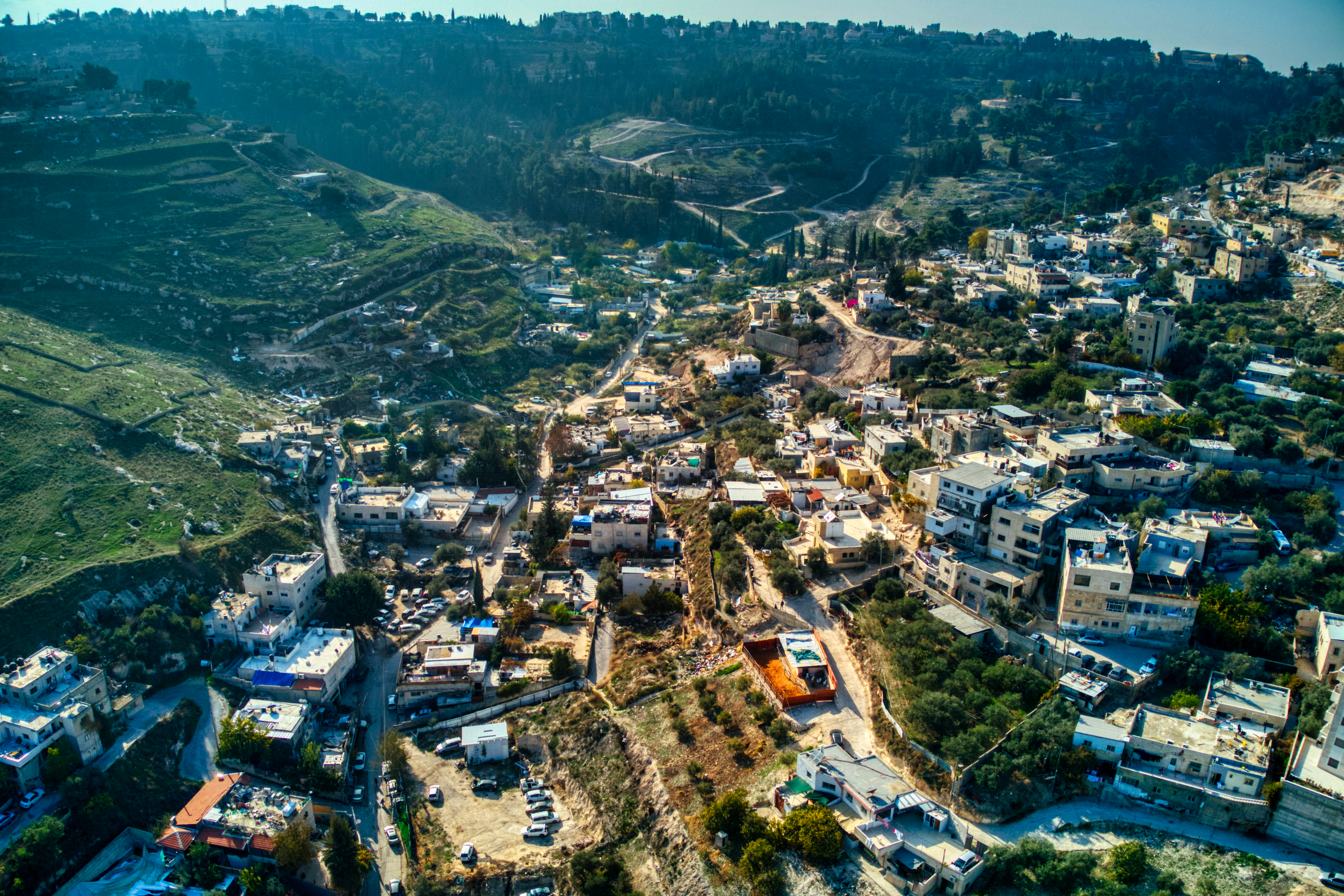
Wad Yatsul in Silwan

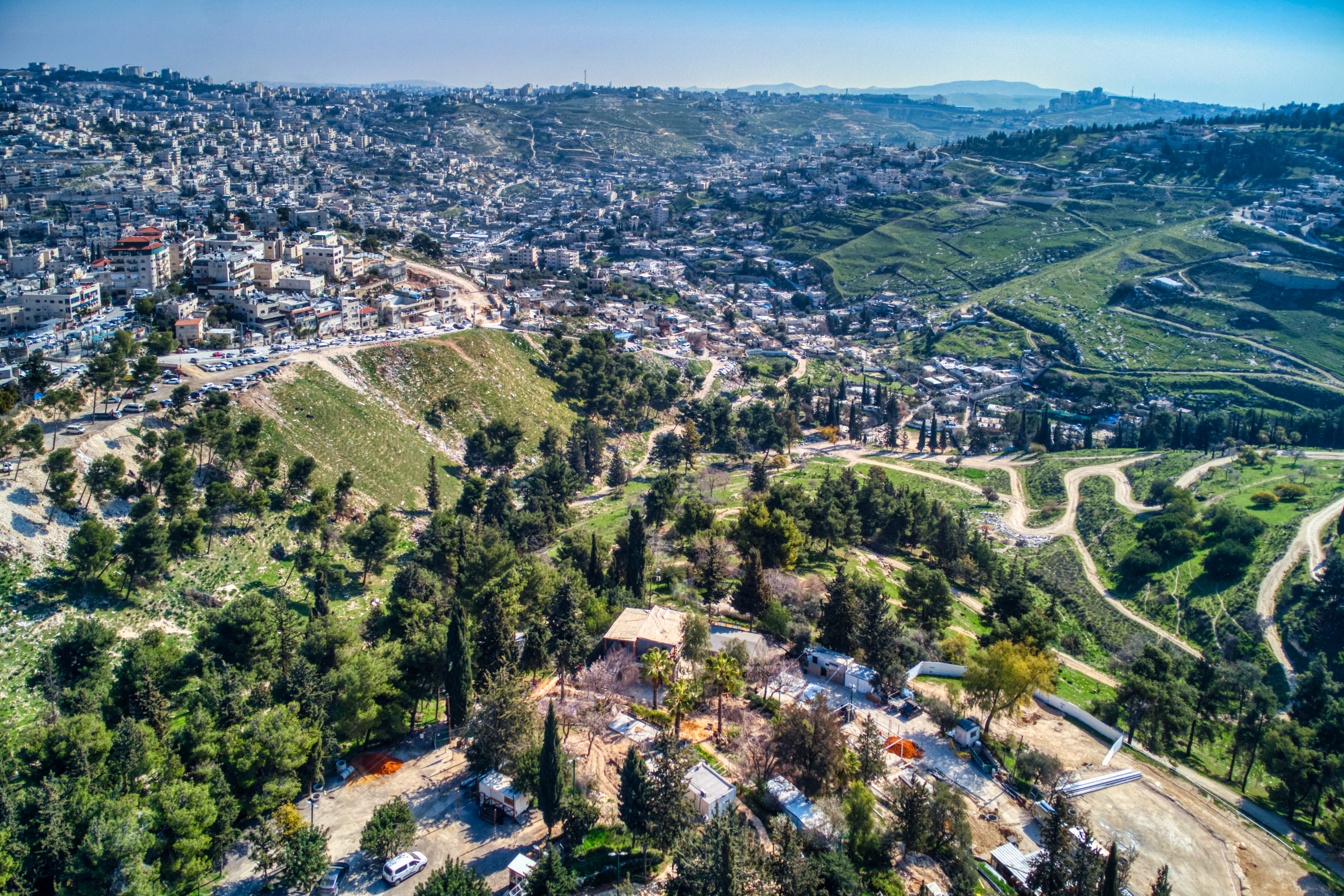
Wad Yatsul from above

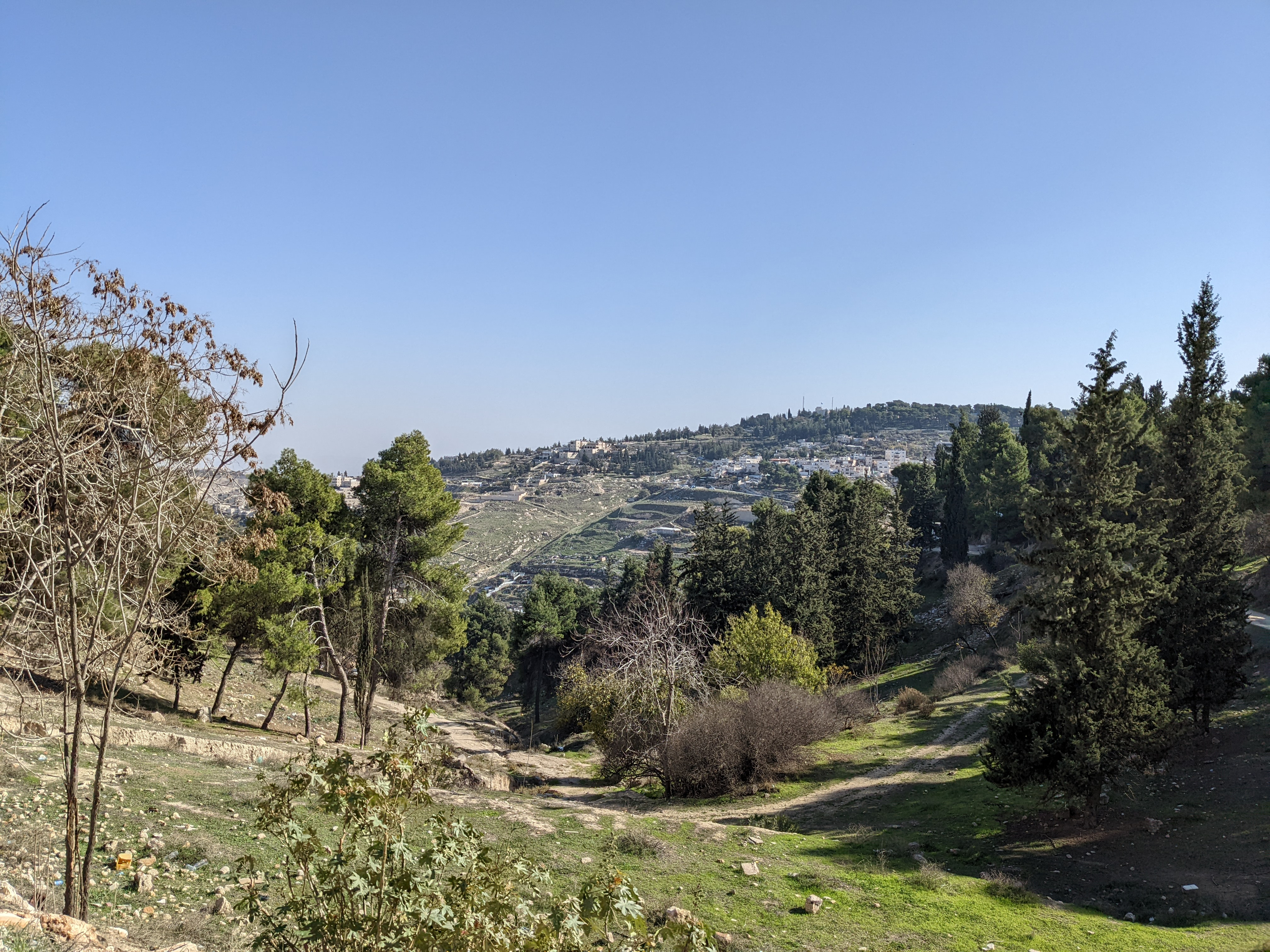
Azal/Azel Valley descending to the Kidron Valley south of Abu Tor

Azal (אצל), or Azel, is a location mentioned in the Book of Zechariah 14:5, in Bibles that use the Hebrew Masoretic Text as the source for this verse. In Bibles that follow the Greek Septuagint (LXX) rendering, depending upon the source manuscript used, Azal is transcribed Jasol (ιασολ, pronounced "Yasol"), Jasod (a corruption of Jasol), or Asael (ασαηλ):

And ye shall flee to the valley of the mountains; for the valley of the mountains shall reach unto Azal: yea, ye shall flee, like as ye fled from before the earthquake in the days of Uzziah king of Judah.

— Zechariah 14:5 King James Version

The valley between the hills will be filled in, yes, it will be blocked as far as Jasol, it will be filled in as it was by the earthquake in the days of Uzziah king of Judah,

— "Zechariah 14:5". New Jerusalem Bible.

== Theories on location ==
No written work prior to the late 19th-century definitively identifies what, or where, Azal is or was. Most Bible commentators of the late 19th century considered it to be a place near Jerusalem. Cyril of Alexandria wrote in his commentary on the Book of Zechariah, Chapter 14. that Azal was known to be “a town situated at the far point of the mountain".

In 1850, geographer Rabbi Joseph Schwarz claimed that Azal was modern Azaria, situated 1 kilometre (0.5 mi) southeast of the southernmost peak of the Mount of Olives (then called Mount Corruption).

French Orientalist and archaeologist Charles Simon Clermont-Ganneau, who identified the site of the ancient Canaanite city of Gezer and preserved the Mesha Stele inscription, claimed that Schwarz was referring to al-Eizariya, the traditional Bethany of New Testament times. However, al-Eizariya lies several kilometers due east of the Mount of Olives, not 1 kilometre (0.5 mi) southeast of it, as Schwarz claimed.

Between 1873 and 1874, Clermont-Ganneau explored many tombs in a valley immediately south of Jerusalem, which the peasants of Silwan called Wady Yasul. Based on geographic and linguistic evidence, Clermont-Ganneau proposed that Wady Yasul is Azal. Currently, this valley is bordered on the west by the Jerusalem Peace Forest and the neighborhood of Talpiot, on the north by the Abu Tor neighborhood on the southern slope of the Hill of Evil Council, and on the south by the neighborhood of Jabel Mukaber on the ridge where the former UN headquarters sits. The mouth of the valley lies at the base of the southernmost summit of the Mount of Olives (Mount of Corruption). Its Hebrew name is Nahal Atzal (נחל אצל).

There is evidence that Clermont-Ganneau's theory and the LXX rendering of Zechariah 14:5 are correct. In 1984, Israeli geologists Daniel Wachs and Dov Levitte identified the location of a large landslide on the Mount of Olives that is directly adjacent to both Wady Yasul (Nahal Atzal) and the area of the ancient King's Gardens at the juncture of the Hinnom and Kidron Valleys. Wachs' and Levitte's discovery validates Jewish historian Flavius Josephus' account of an earthquake-caused landslide during King Uzziah's reign blocking up the kings' gardens in the valley. It also accords with the LXX rendering of Zechariah 14:5, which states a valley will be blocked up as far as Azal. Additionally, the Israelis officially named this valley אצל (Atzal), which is the same Hebrew spelling of Azal (אצל).
