= El-Habs =

Valley in Modi'in-Maccabim-Re'ut, Israel

El-Habs / Valley of the Monks
- احبس (Arabic) בקעת הנזירים (Hebrew)
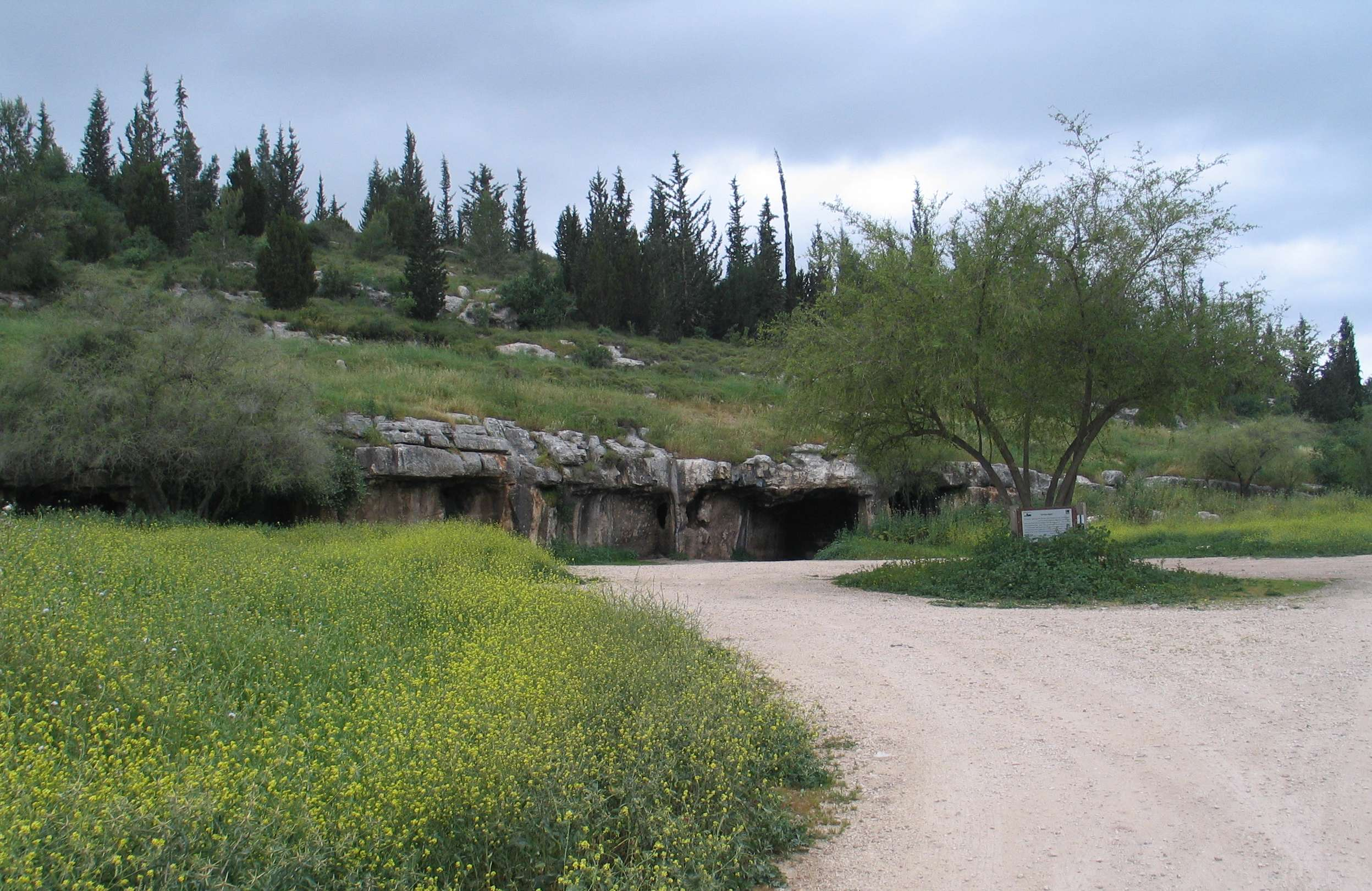
- El-Habs cave looking south

- Shown in Israel
- 31°55′36″N 34°58′22″E
- Type: Caves, tombs, water reservoir
- Periods: Roman, Byzantine, Crusader
- Location: Israel
- Region: Modi'in hills, Israel

El-Habs (Arabic: احبس), nicknamed Valley of the Monks (Hebrew: בקעת הנזירים, Bik'at HaNezirim) is a site of a cave which served Christian monastic chambers, on the channel of the Gimzo Stream. It is situated at the foot of Horbat Zekhariya and together with Horbat Kelah form a complex of archaeological sites in the hills of Modi'in-Maccabim-Re'ut, in the territory of Ben Shemen Forest. The site serves today as picnic point, with several hiking and bicycle trails passing by.

Apart from the caves are other features. To the northwest is water reservoir, next to which the remains of a small settlement dating to the Byzantine period (330–636 CE). To the east a sculpted, rock-cut burial cave with five burials, dating to the Roman period (1st century BCE to 1st century CE). Most of the sites are related to Christian activity in the region. The site was explored by 19th century researchers from France and the United Kingdom, and by Israeli archaeologists in the 90s.

== Discovery and name ==
The site was studied by the French explorers Victor Guérin in 1870 and Charles Simon Clermont-Ganneau in 1871–74, and in 1874 by the British Palestine Exploration Fund as part of the PEF Survey of Palestine. Their discoveries were confirmed in 1892 by Paul M. Séjourné of the École Biblique in Jerusalem. In the 1990s, the site was surveyed as part of the Archaeological Survey of Israel by a team of the Israel Antiquities Authority (IAA), headed by Alon Shavit.

The Arabic name of the site, as it appears in all 19th century sources is el-Habs, which was explained in 1881 by Edward Henry Palmer of the PEF as meaning "The Religious Endowmen" or "Mosque Property" (similar to "waqf"). The Hebrew nickname Valley of the Monks or Monks' Valley was given by the historical geographer Zohar Bar'am, which was popularized by Israeli artist Oded Feingersh^{(he)}. The name has been adopted by the Jewish National Fund. The municipality of Modi'in-Maccabim-Reut has published an article on the site, proposing an alternative name: Cave Valley in Gamzo Stream (Hebrew: בקעת המערות בנחל גמזו, Bikat Ha'Nezirim BeNahal Gamzo).

== El-Habs cave ==
The cave, hewn into the foot of the hill on which Horbat Zekharya stands, appears in the IAA survey as Site 148 (Ma'arot Nizirim meaning: "Monks' Caves"). It is a complex of rock-hewn cavities, most likely serving as monastic chambers. In the entrance there is a courtyard, with an area of 40 square meters, under a bedrock ceiling, that is supported by a pillar. At least two branches of cavities are accessed from the courtyard, measuring up to 8 meters in length at between 1.5 and 1.8 in height. Some of the chambers feature rock-cut benches and crosses are incised on the walls.

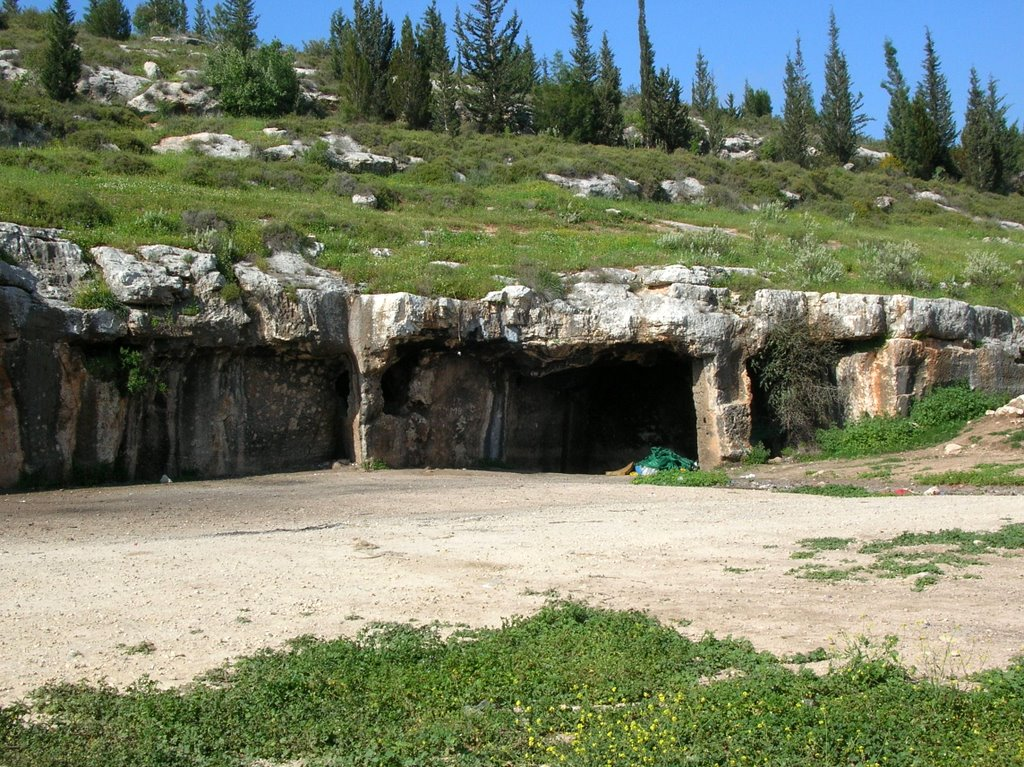
Entrance of the monastic cave

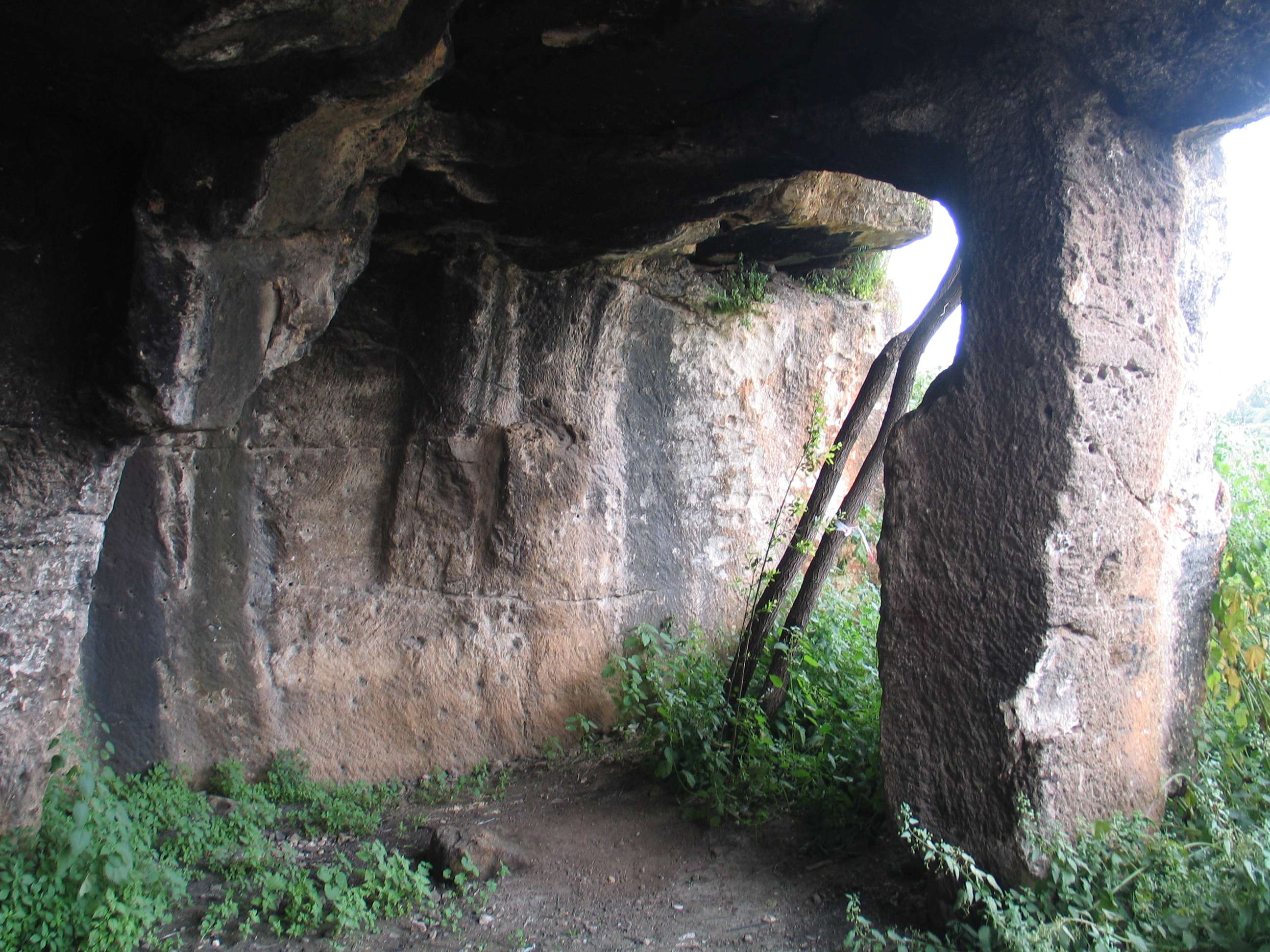
Entrance and supporting pillar from the courtyard

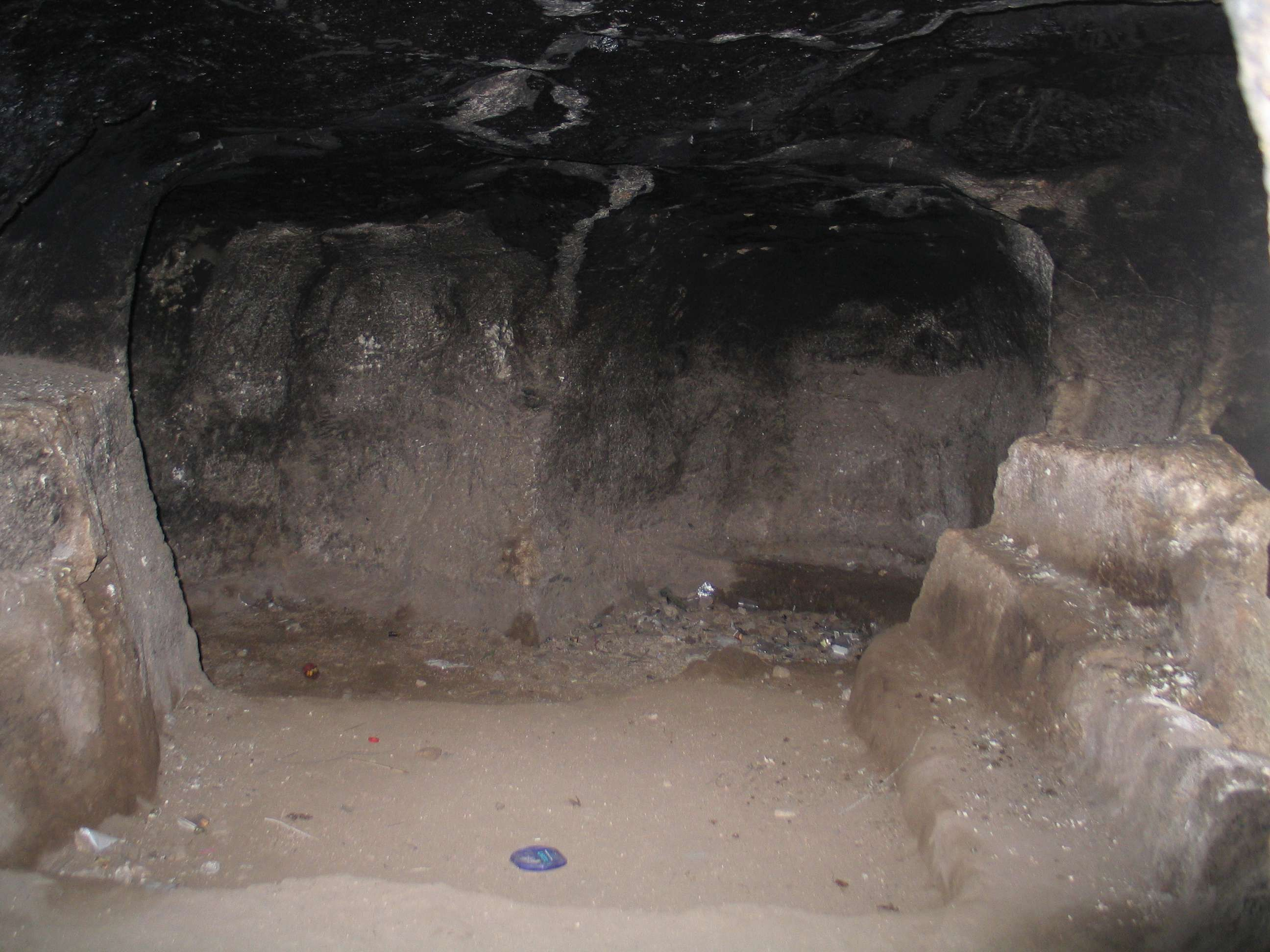
One of the interior chambers, with rock-hewn benches to the right

== Bir es-Shami ==
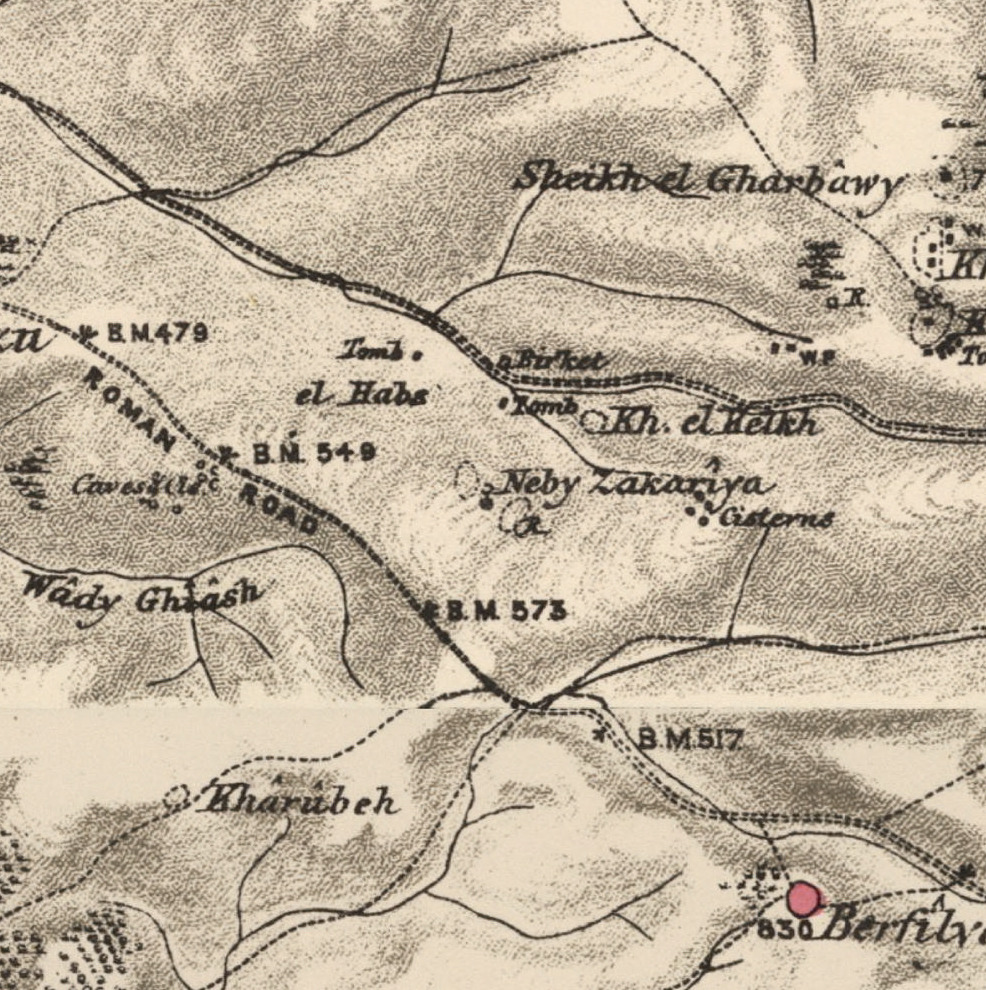
Map of the region prepared by the PEF (1880)

The water reservoir or Birkeh is located to the north of the monastic caves and appears in the IAA survey as Site 147 (Bir es-Shami). The reservoir has a rectangular shape, measuring 10 x 15 meters. It has a depth of 3 meters, its base is hewn in bedrock and built stones surviving up to three courses. The reservoir is accessed through a staircase. An of ashlar-built dam collects rainwater and prevents rocks from the valley to erode into the reservoir. To the northeast of the reservoir, the remains of a settlement spanning 5 dunams were reported by the IAA survey, including walls and pottery dated to the Byzantine period (4th–7th centuries CE).

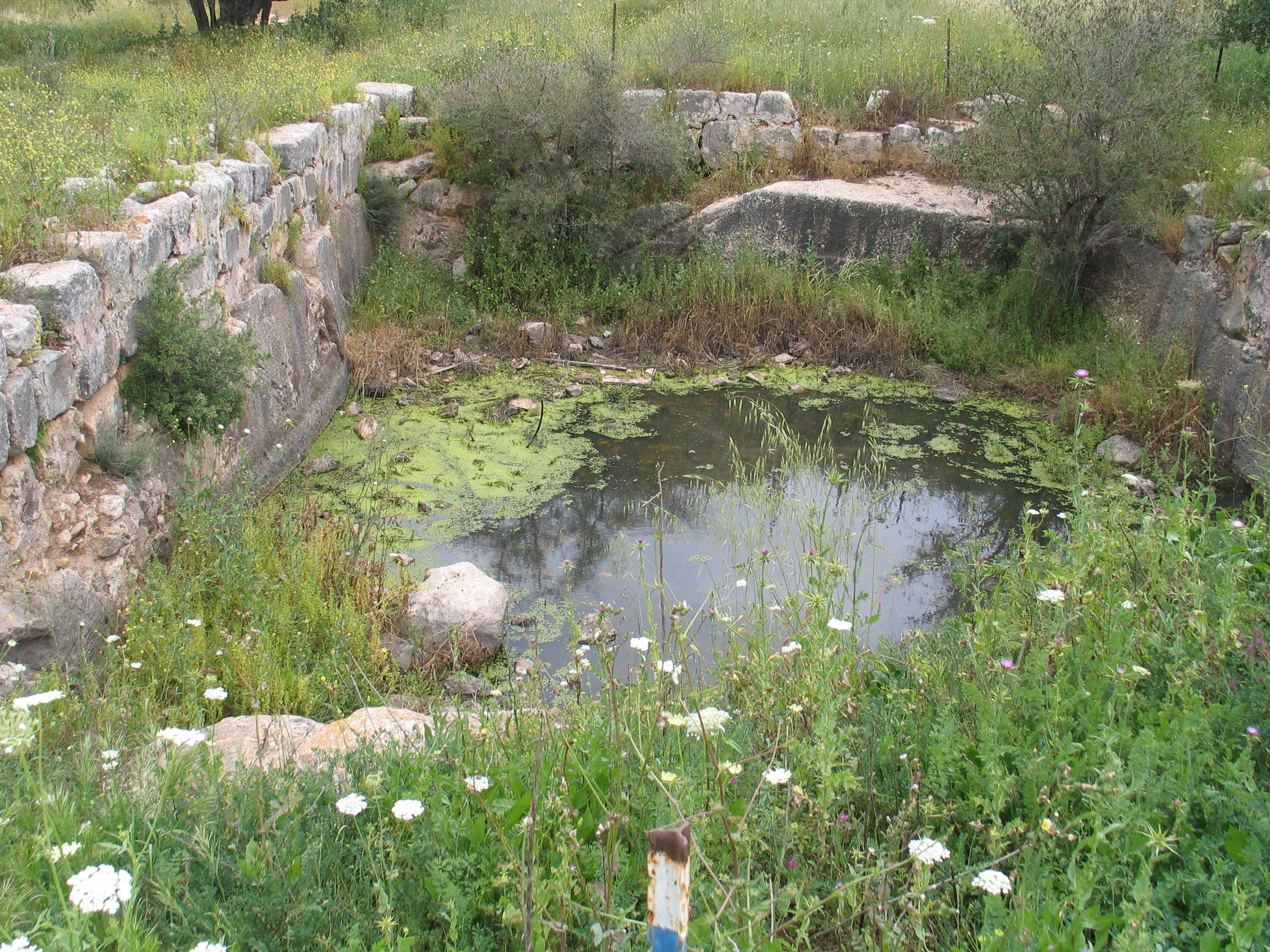
Bir es-Shami, facing north

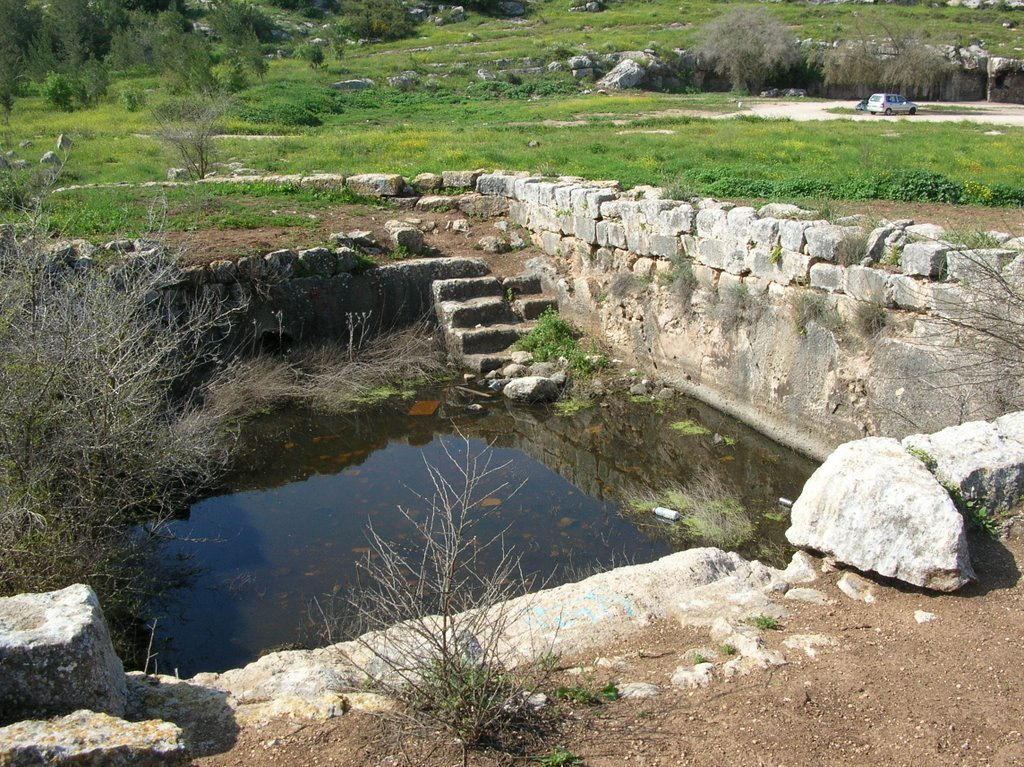
Bir es-Shami, facing south

== Rock-hewn tomb ==
The tomb is located to the east of the caves and pool and appears in the IAA survey as Site 149 (Bir es-Shami (West)). Its entrance is mostly concealed by earth. Clermont-Ganneau dated it in 1896 to the early Roman period based on its architecture. It was dug into the bedrock and its façade was shaped as a pediment, situated on two columns. In the tympanum a bird was carved, most likely an eagle. The inner chamber has five arcosolia (place of burial), one facing the entrance and two on each of the other side, separated by engaged columns. The chamber walls were probably covered with a layer of stucco, pieces of which were found by Clermont-Ganneau. A cornice runs round the chamber. In 2014, Shavit reported that the relief of the eagle was destroyed, probably intentionally.

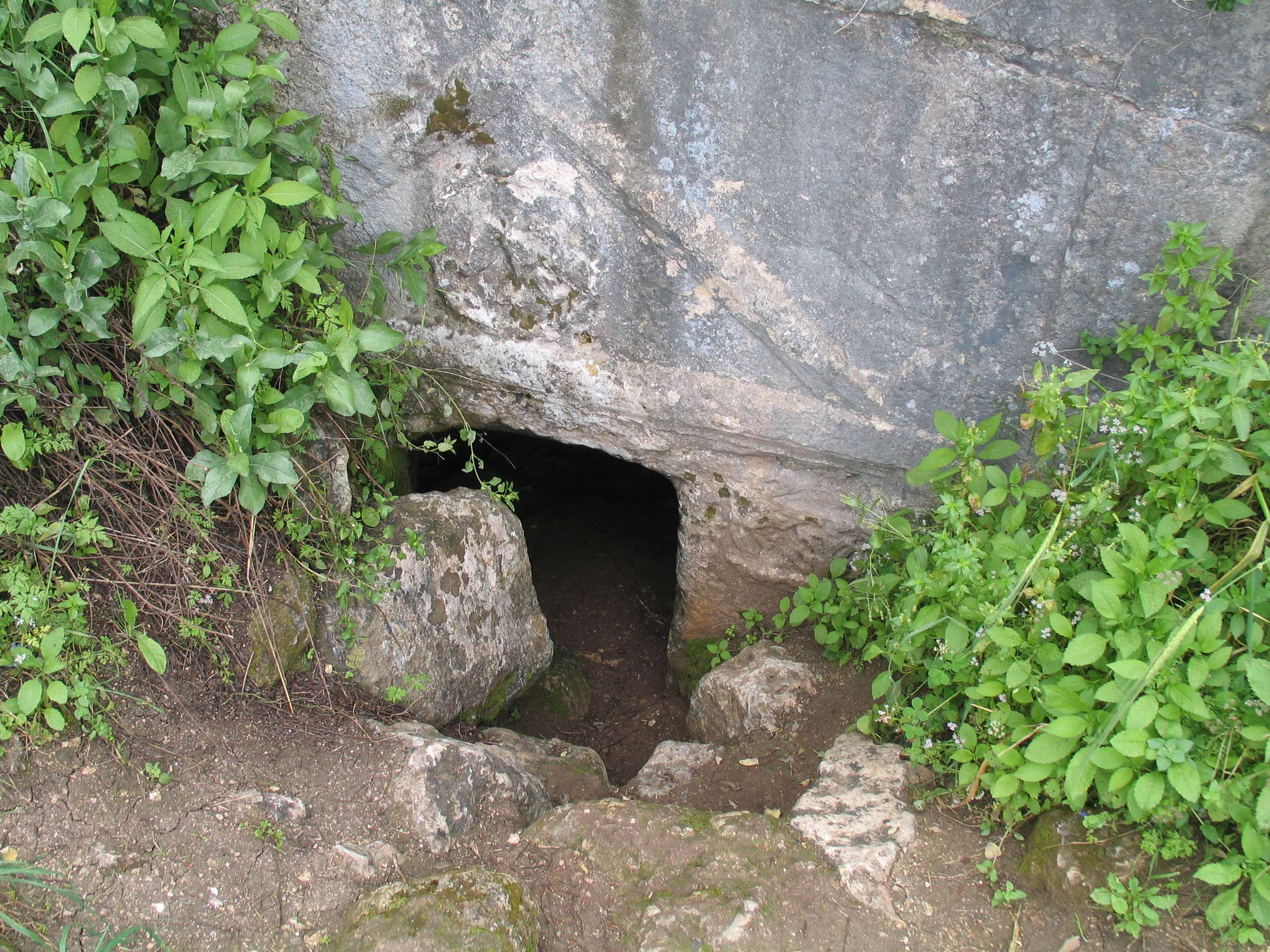
Entrance of the cave from the outside

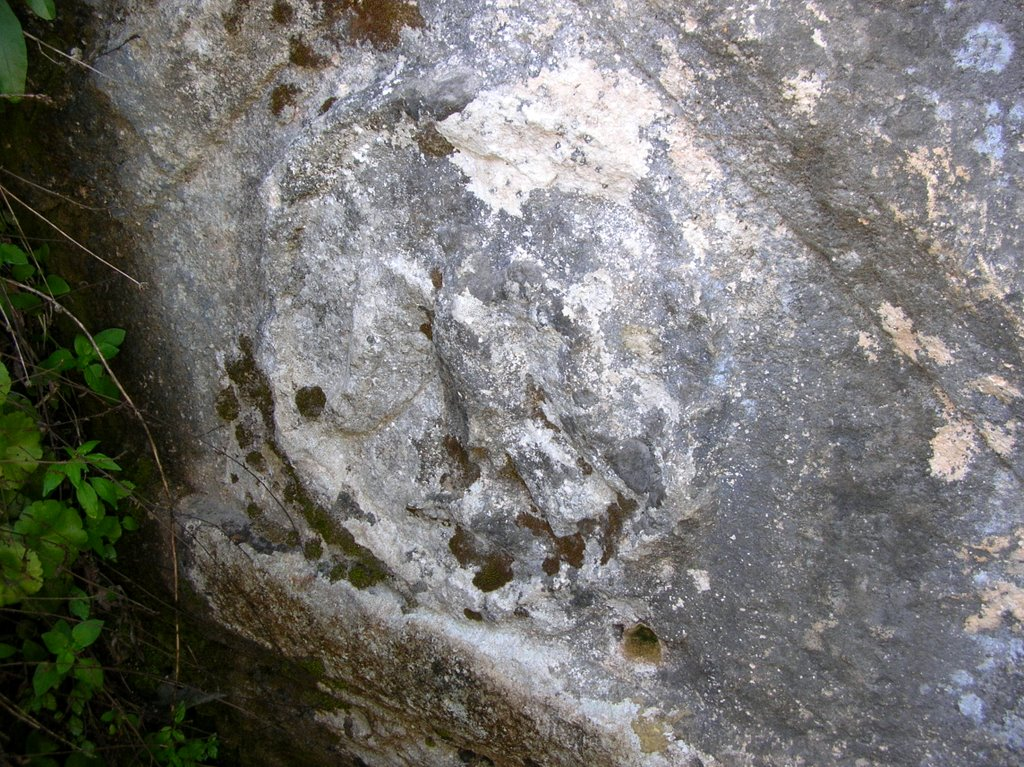
Close-up of the medallion and the eagle relief

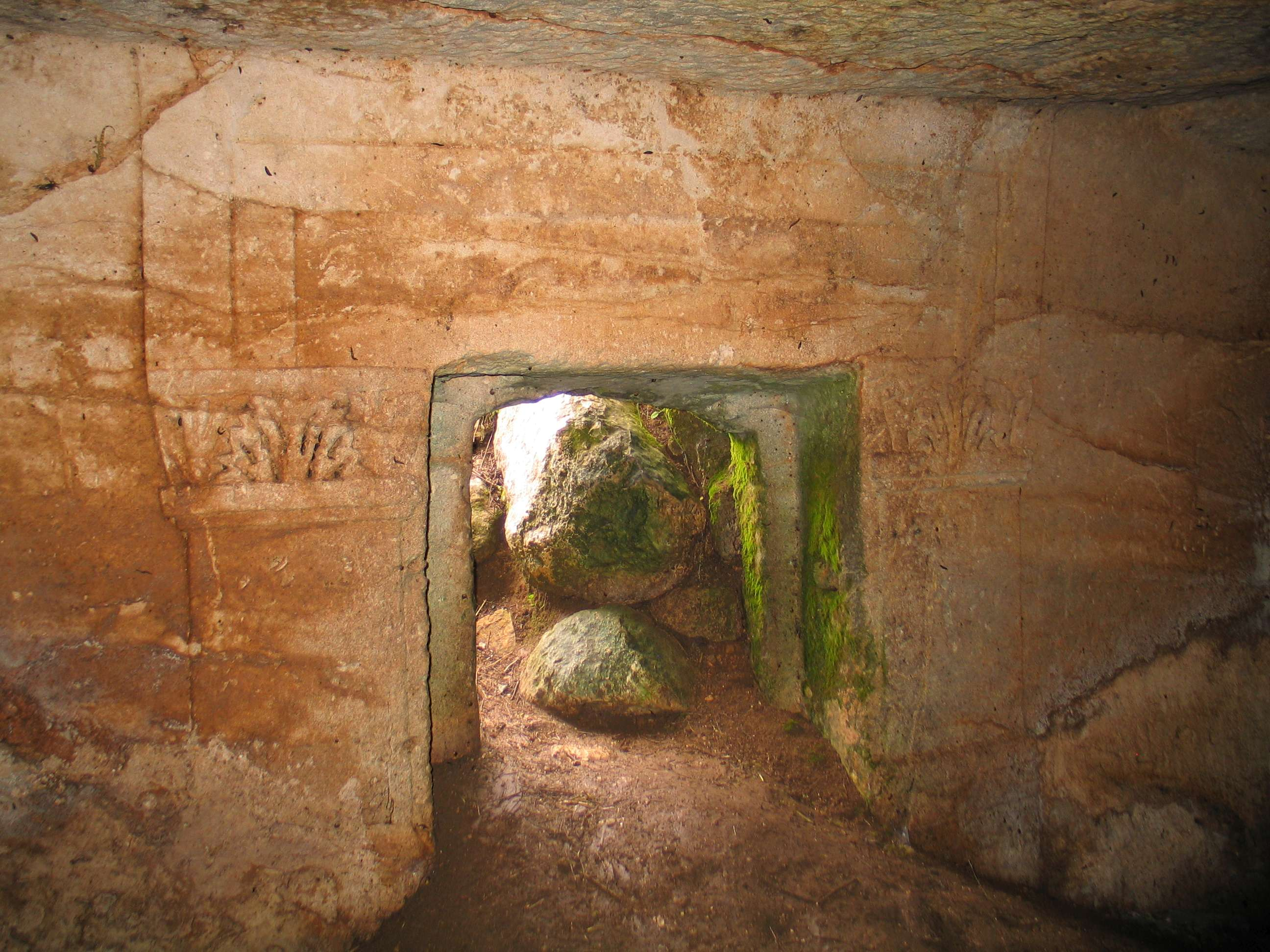
Entrance of the cave from the interior

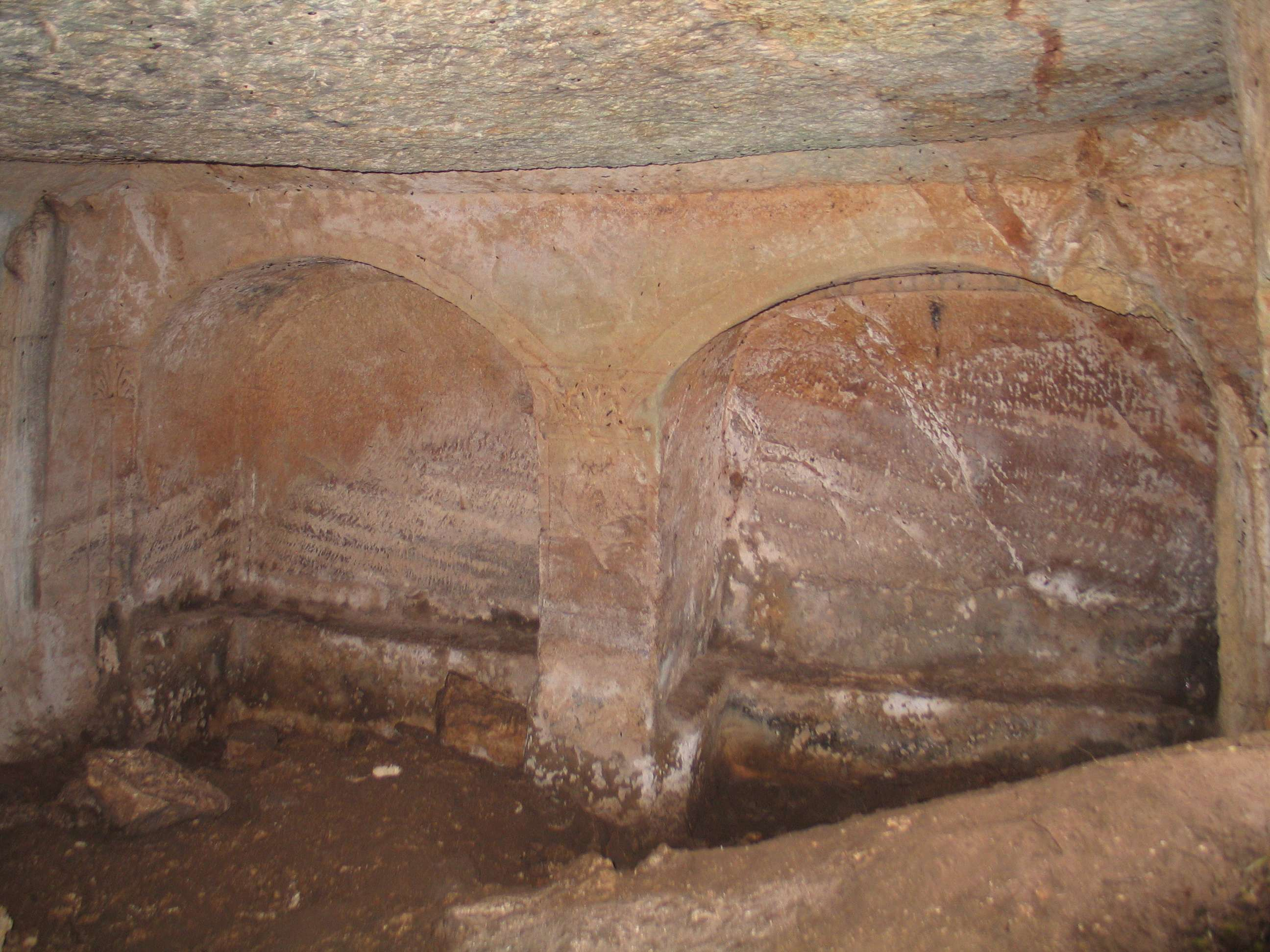
Two of the five arcosolia

== Inscribed tomb ==
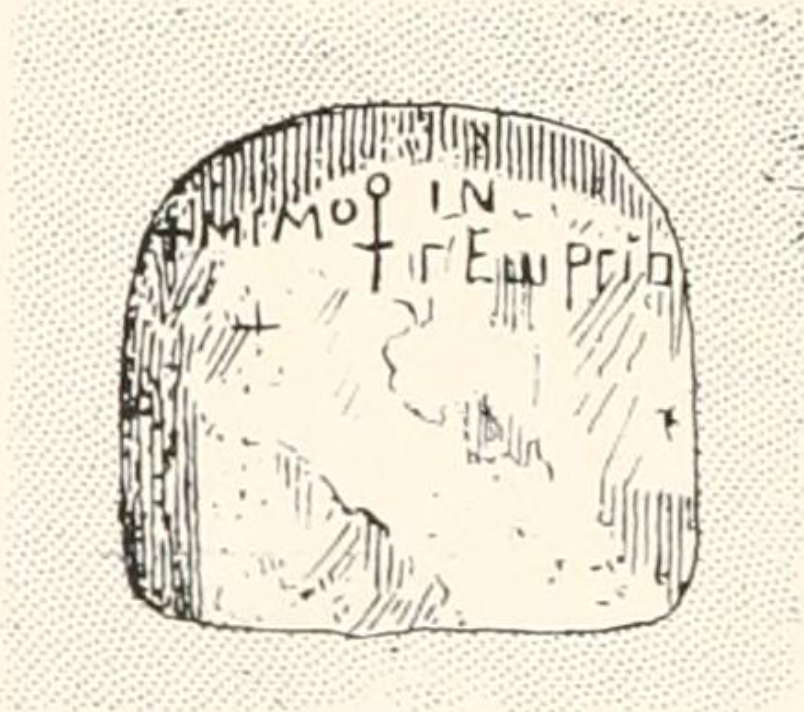
Sketch of the inscription (by Clermont-Ganneau, 1896)

Clermont-Ganneau included in his report a tomb. The tomb had two loculi (a niche serving for burial), each with two vault, incised with crosses. One of the vaults had a Greek inscription cut into its wall:

Μιμοριν Γεωργο(ν)

— Clermont-Ganneau, 1896, p. 346

Clearmont-Ganneau translated it as "Tomb of George", while Condor and Kithcener of the PEF translated it as "Monument of Georgeos". The crosses indicate it was of Christian origin. The members of the PEF dated the inscription based on its character to the 12th century CE (Crusader era). In 1891, Séjourné visited the site during a tour in the region and reported that the inscription was destroyed.

== Bibliography ==
- Clermont-Ganneau, C.S. (1896). [ARP] Archaeological Researches in Palestine 1873–1874, translated from the French by J. McFarlane. Vol. 2. London: Palestine Exploration Fund.
- Conder, C.R.; Kitchener, H.H. (1882). The Survey of Western Palestine: Memoirs of the Topography, Orography, Hydrography, and Archaeology. Vol. 2. London: Committee of the Palestine Exploration Fund.
- Guérin, V. (1875). Description Géographique Historique et Archéologique de la Palestine (in French). Vol. 2: Samarie, pt. 2. Paris: L'Imprimerie Nationale.
- Malka, Ayelet Hashahar (2012). Christians and Christianity: Corpus of Christian Sites in Samaria and Northern Judea. Jerusalem: Archaeological Staff Officer of Judea and Samaria. pp. 230–231. ISBN 978-965-406-252-7.
- Palmer, E.H. (1881). The Survey of Western Palestine: Arabic and English Name Lists Collected During the Survey by Lieutenants Conder and Kitchener, R. E. Transliterated and Explained by E.H. Palmer. Committee of the Palestine Exploration Fund.
- Séjourné, Paul M. (1892). "La Palestine Chrétienne: Découvertes Récentes et Explorations". Revue Biblique (in French). 1 (1): 124–125. JSTOR 44099974.
- Shavit, Alon (2014). "Gezer 82". Archaeological Survey of Israel. Israel Antiquities Authority. ISBN 978-965-406-303-6.
