= Miriam ossuary =

Possible ossuary of Miriam

Miriam ossuary is a decorated limestone ossuary from a tomb in the Valley of Elah, Israel, which bears an inscription attributing it to "Miriam, the daughter of Yeshua."

== History ==
The Miriam ossuary came to light in June 2011. Archaeologists from Bar-Ilan and Tel Aviv Universities announced that it had been plundered from a tomb in the Valley of Elah. The Israel Antiquities Authority declared it authentic, and expressed regret that it couldn't be studied in situ. It is inscribed with the text: "Miriam, daughter of Yeshua, son of Caiaphas, Priest of Ma’aziah from Beth ‘Imri". Based on it, Caiaphas can be assigned to the priestly course of Ma’aziah, instituted by King David.

The script is formal, in a style common in ossuary inscriptions of the late Second Temple period. Similar ossuaries were found in the Jerusalem area from the second half of the 1st century BC until the destruction of the Second Temple. In Judea, this type of ossuary continued to be common until the Bar Kochba revolt. The researchers dated the ossuary based on the excavation and other findings to approximately 70 AD.

== Structure ==
The ossuary is made of limestone, length 46 cm, width 23 cm and height 26 cm. It stands on four legs. The front is decorated with two circles, and in each circle a rosette with six leaves. The circles are surrounded by a rectangular frame. The inscription is carved above the rectangular frame, between it and the lip of the ossuary. Another decoration of a circle and a rosette also decorates one narrow side of the ossuary. The lid is arched. There is an inscription. The length of the inscription is 35.5 cm, the height of the letters varies between 10–15 cm. The script in which the inscription was written was common at the end of Second Temple period.

== See also ==
- Caiaphas ossuary
- Archaeology of Israel
