= Lormes =

- Commune
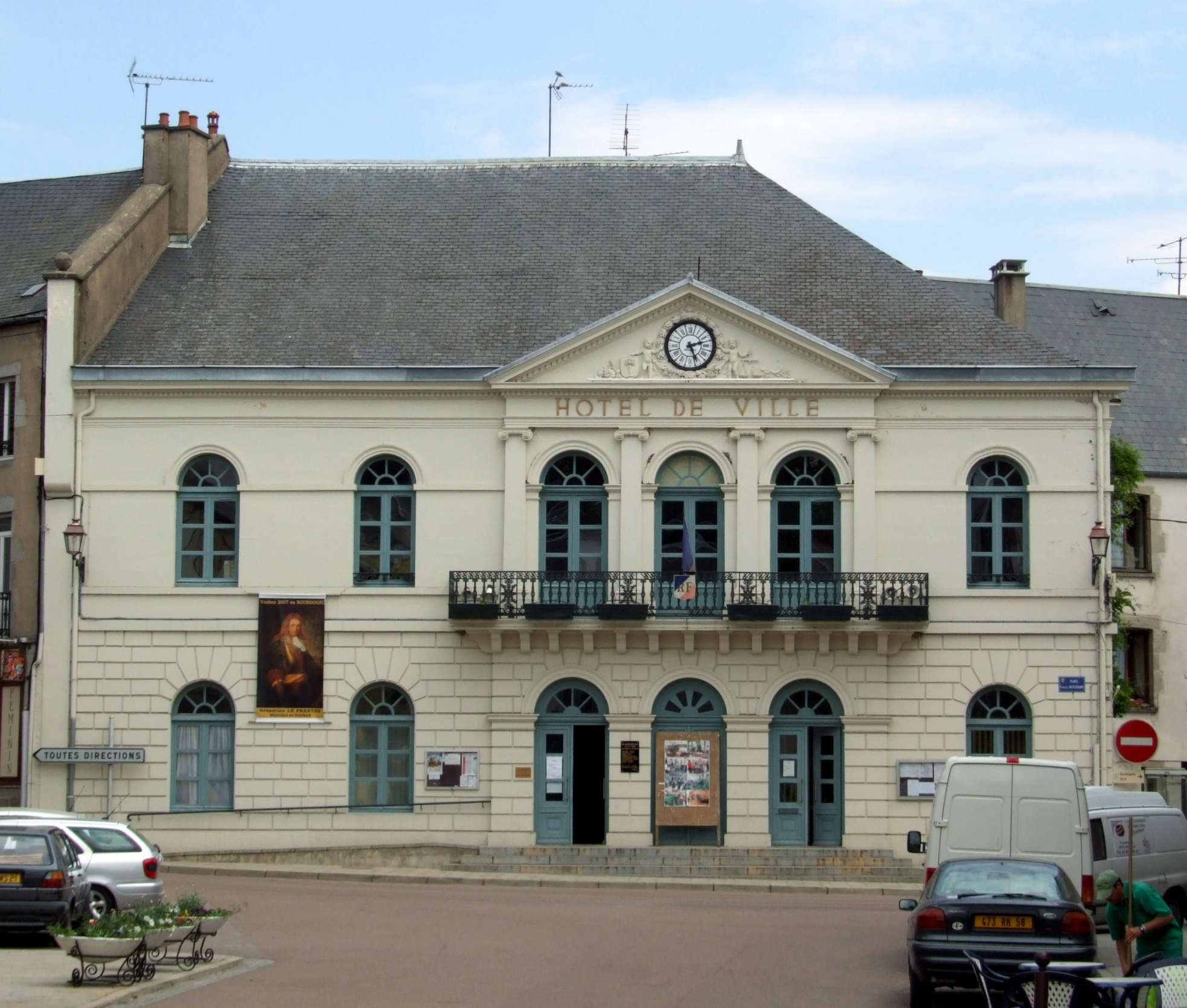
- The town hall in Lormes

- Coat of arms
- Location of Lormes
- Location within France Location within Bourgogne-Franche-Comté
- Coordinates: 47°17′27″N 3°49′06″E
- Country: France
- Region: Bourgogne-Franche-Comté
- Department: Nièvre
- Arrondissement: Château-Chinon (Ville)
- Canton: Corbigny
- Intercommunality: CC Morvan Sommets et Grands Lacs

Government
  - Mayor (2021–2026): Christian Paul (PS)
- Area^{1}: 51.71 km^{2} (19.97 sq mi)
- Highest elevation: 626 m (2,054 ft)
- Lowest elevation: 202 m (663 ft)
- Population (2023): 1,251
  - Density: 24.19/km^{2} (62.66/sq mi)
- Demonym: Lormois
- Time zone: UTC+01:00 (CET)
  - Summer (DST): UTC+02:00 (CEST)
- INSEE/Postal code: 58145 /58140
- ^{1} French Land Register data, which excludes lakes, ponds, glaciers > 1 km^{2} (0.386 sq mi or 247 acres) and river estuaries.

Lormes (French pronunciation: [lɔʁm]) is a rural commune in the Nièvre department in central France. It is part of Morvan Regional Natural Park.

== History ==
In World War II, amid the Liberation of France, German occupying forces killed eight people in Lormes:

On 12 June 1944, the men of Maquis Julien purloined some uniforms from the Gendarmerie, with a view to an upcoming operation. Alerted to this intervention, the Wehrmacht stepped in, attacked and took it out on the local population. Ten civilians were taken hostage, several buildings in the town were partially burnt down and five maquisards and three inhabitants were killed.

Mayor Gaspard Gueugniaud later wrote:

Following the fighting, the Germans frightened the population, organised the looting of all the houses on the square, stole everything they could carry, set fire to five houses...

== Notable people ==
The mystic Simon Ganneau (1805–1851) was born in Lormes, as was the writer Henri Bachelin (1879–1941), winner of the 1918 Prix Femina for Le Serviteur.

== See also ==
- Communes of the Nièvre department
- Morvan Regional Natural Park
