= Caiaphas ossuary =

Ossuary discovered in Jerusalem, Israel in 1990

Coordinates: 31°45′31″N 35°13′43″E

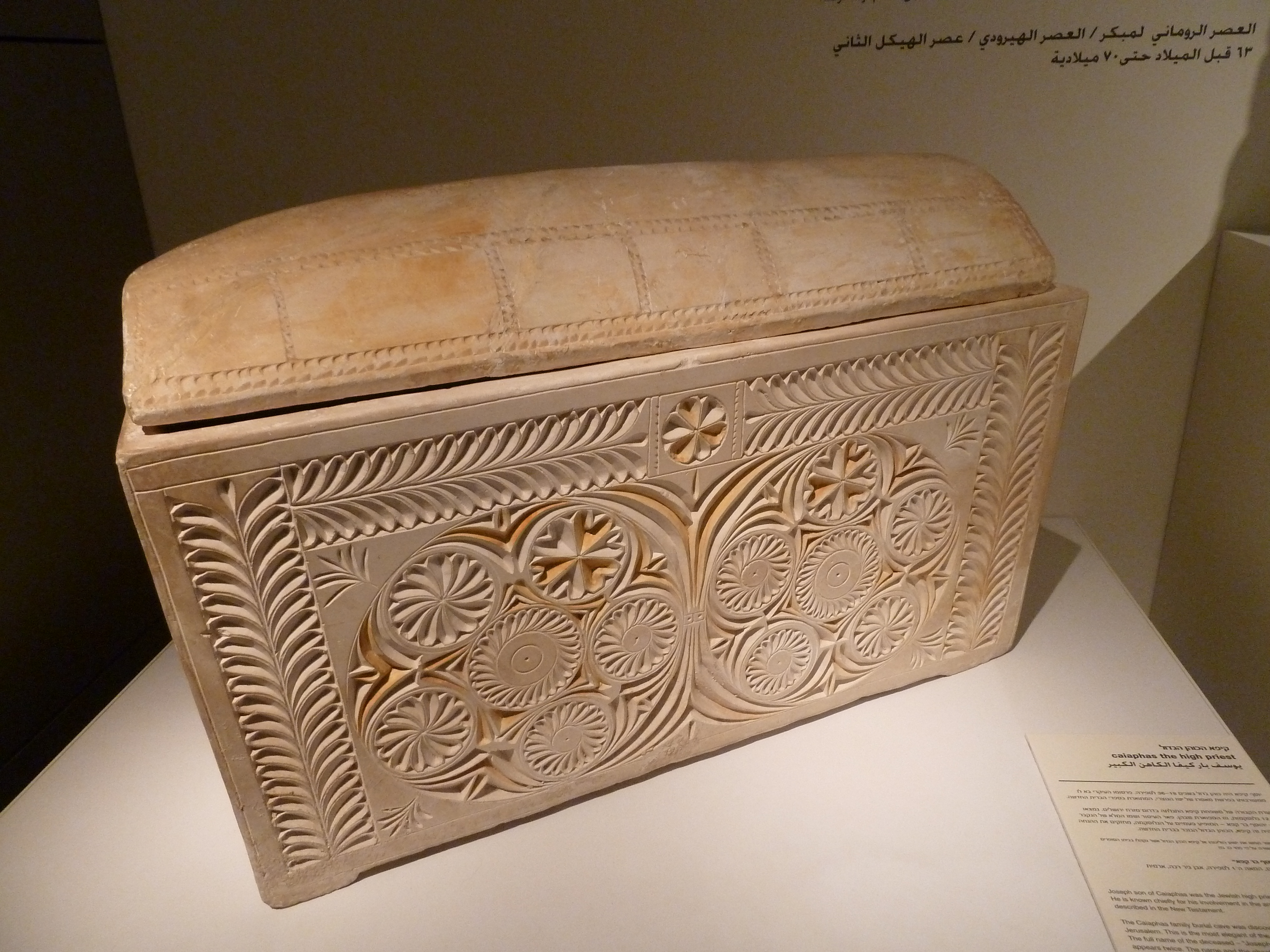
The Caiaphas ossuary, Israel Museum, Jerusalem

The Caiaphas ossuary is one of twelve ossuaries or bone boxes, discovered in a burial cave in south Jerusalem in December 1990, two of which featured the name "Caiaphas".

== History ==
The Caiaphas ossuary is a highly decorated ossuary twice inscribed "Joseph, son of Caiaphas" which held the bones of a 60-year-old male. The limestone ossuary measures c. 37 cm (15 in) high by 75 cm (30 in) long and is housed in the Israel Museum, Jerusalem.

It has been suggested that it belonged to Joseph, son of Caiaphas, known as the High Priest of Israel Caiaphas in the New Testament. According to the Canonical gospels, Caiaphas was the major antagonist of Jesus.

It should be distinguished from the less ornate Miriam ossuary, which came to light in June 2011. The latter is a looted, though authenticated artifact from the Valley of Elah, bearing the inscription: "Miriam daughter of Yeshua son of Caiapha, priest of Ma’azya from Beit Imri".

The chamber tomb was discovered by construction workers in November 1990. It was located in the Peace Forest, near the North Talpiot neighborhood. The workers' superintendent reported it to the Israel Antiquities Authority after the tomb's roof was opened by a bulldozer, to reveal the rock-hewn loculi burial cave. The burial was typical of the Second Temple period (516 BCE and 70 CE) in Jerusalem, and one of many in the Jerusalem necropolis which may be encountered as far south as the Arab village of Sur Baher.

The four cave niches contained twelve ossuaries, of which six had been disturbed by grave robbers. One very ornate ossuary contained the bones of two infants, two teenage boys, an adult woman and a man of about 60. Besides the detailed etching, there were traces of bright orange paint. It was inscribed "Yehosef bar Qayafa" on the long side, and "Yehosef bar Qafa" on the narrow side.

The bones were eventually reburied on the Mount of Olives.

== Background ==
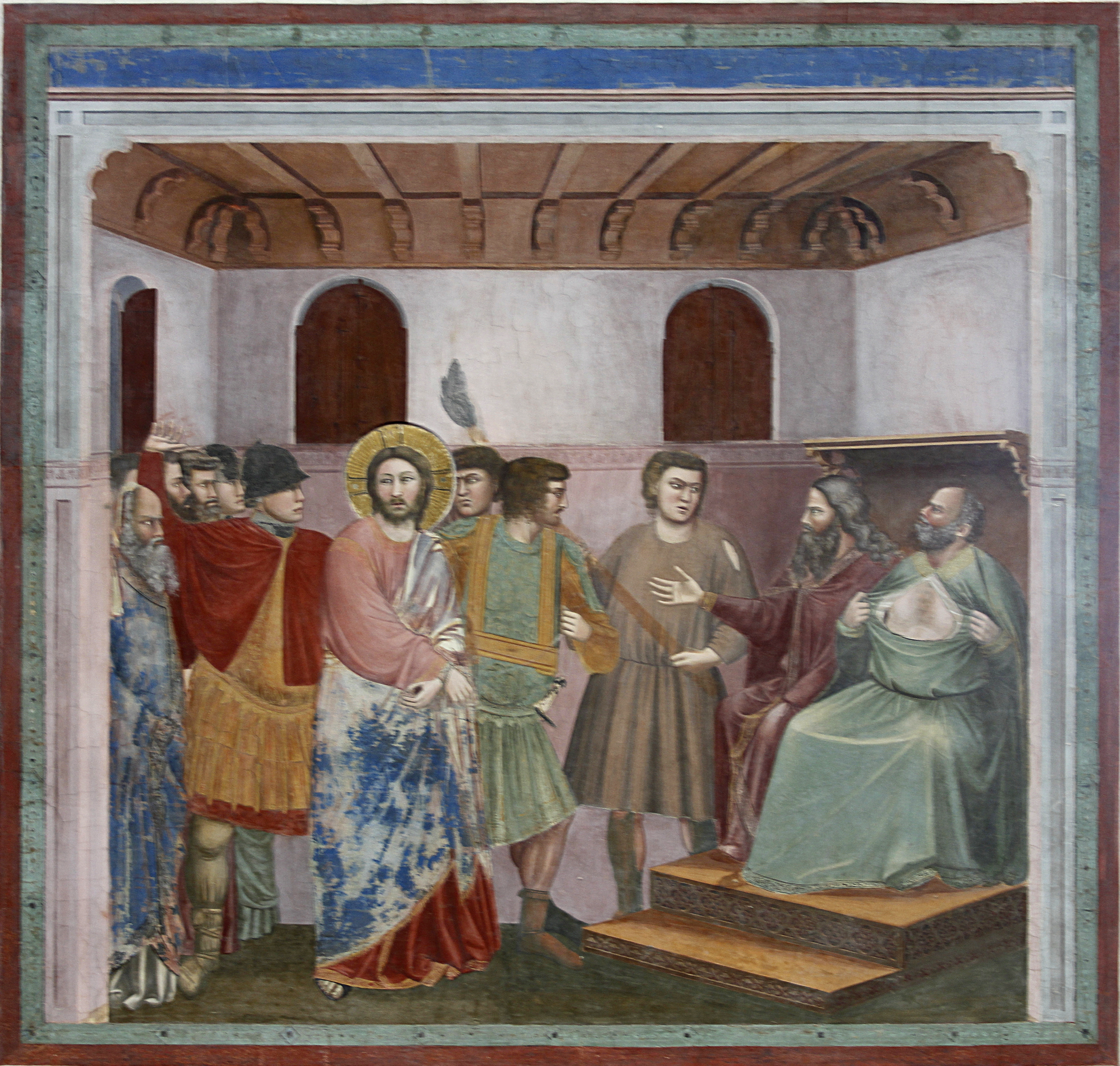
Christ before Caiaphas The High Priest is depicted tearing his robe in righteous indignation at Jesus' perceived blasphemy - Cappella Scrovegni in Padua, Giotto di Bondone, Life of Christ

According to The New York Times and a number of biblical scholars, if authentic and attributable to high priest Caiaphas, the ossuary is an important confirmation of the New Testament account, and facilitates understanding of the historical Jesus. More generally, the contents of the burial cave increase knowledge of ossuary inscriptions and burial customs of the Second Temple period.

In June 2011, archaeologists from Bar-Ilan and Tel Aviv Universities announced the recovery of a stolen ossuary, plundered from a tomb in the Valley of Elah. The Israel Antiquities Authority declared it authentic, and expressed regret that it couldn't be studied in situ. It is inscribed with the text: "Miriam, daughter of Yeshua, son of Caiaphas, Priest of Ma’aziah from Beth ‘Imri". Based on it, Caiaphas can be assigned to the priestly course of Ma’aziah, instituted by king David.

== Authenticity ==
Since the original discovery, the identification with Caiaphas has been challenged by some scholars on various grounds, including the spelling of the inscription, the lack of any mention of Caiaphas's status as High Priest, the plainness of the tomb (although the ossuary itself is as ornate as might be expected from someone of his rank and family), and other reasons.

== Gallery ==
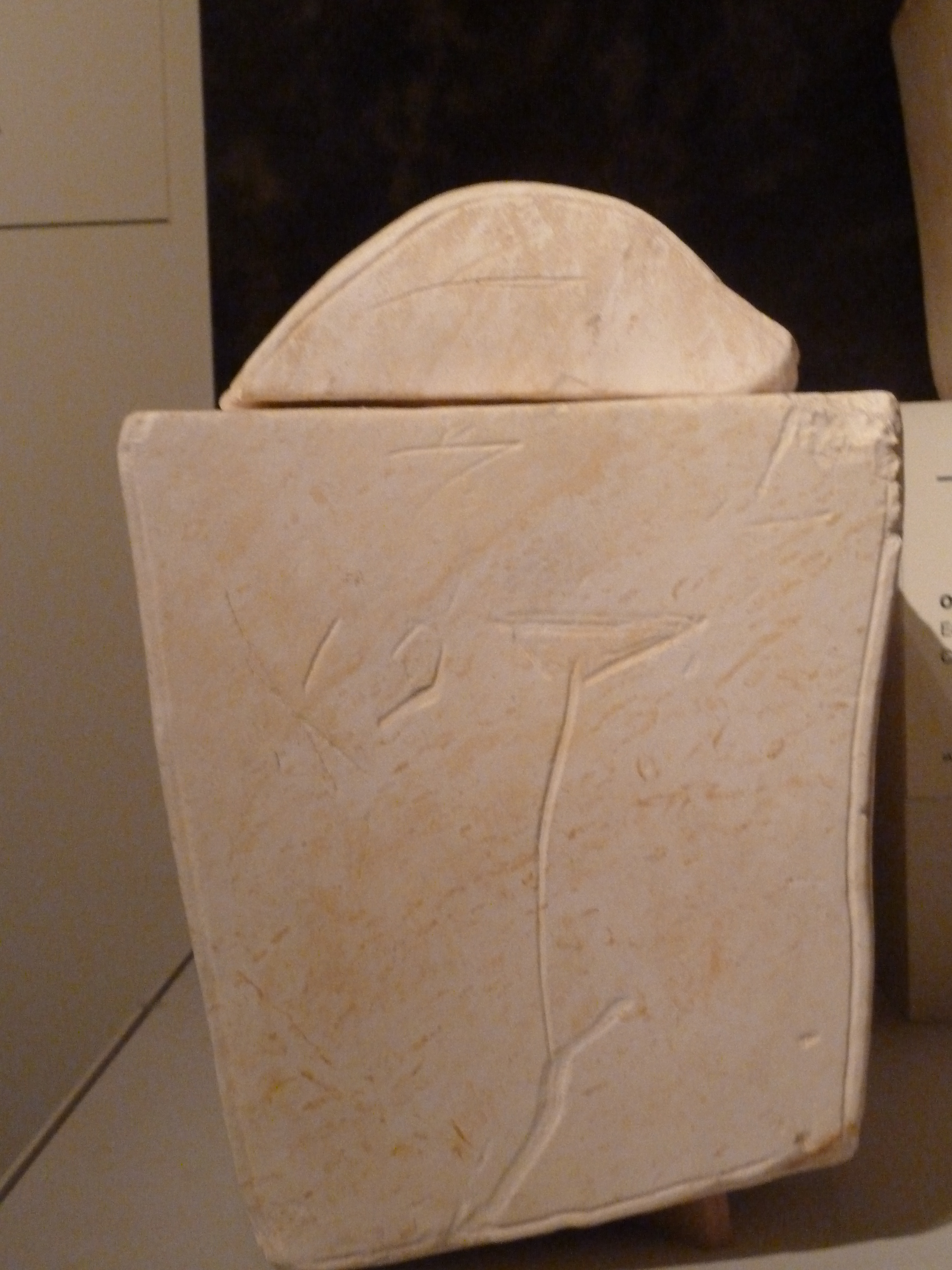
The name "קפא" - Caiaphas on the ossuary, the Israel Museum, Jerusalem

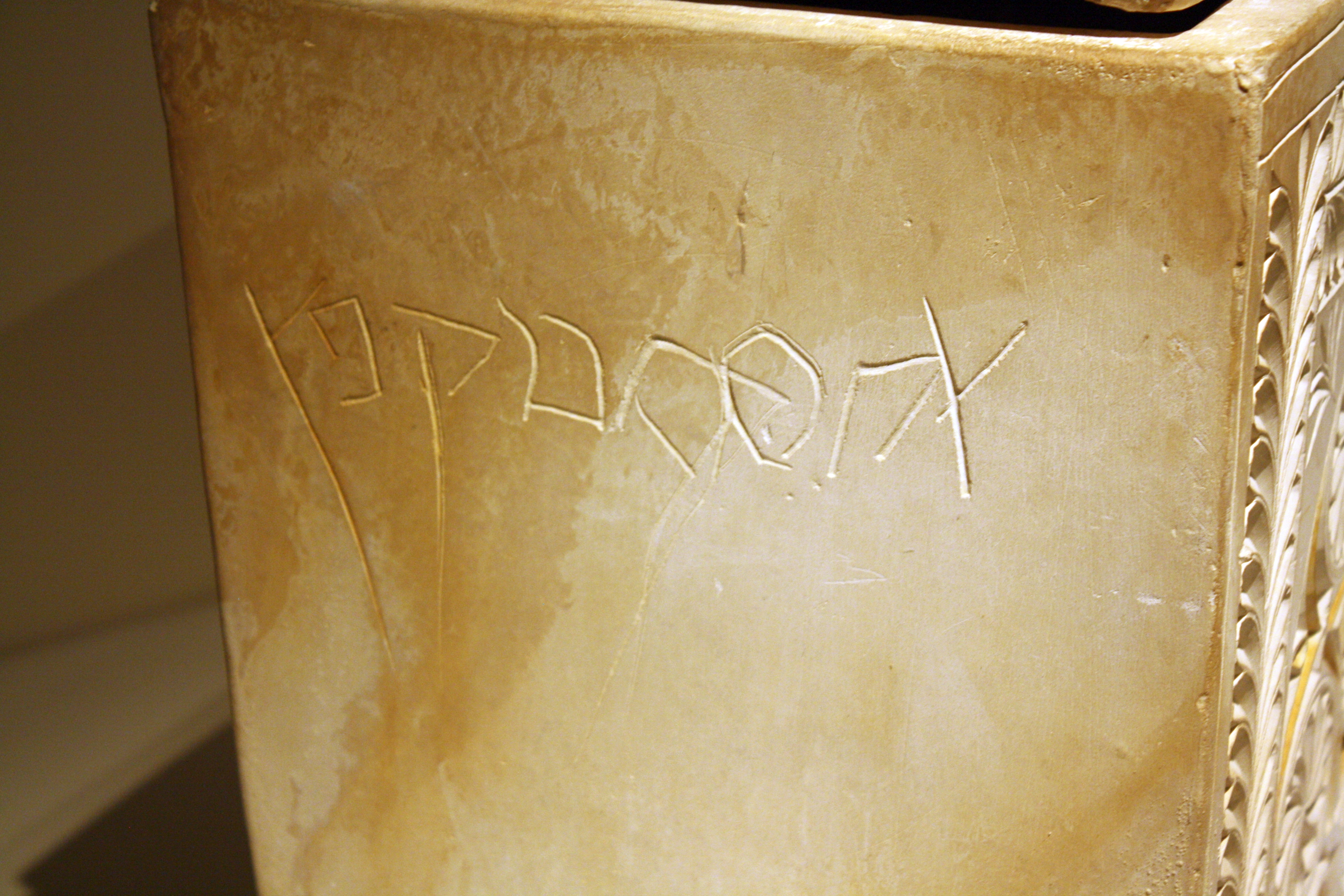
Caiaphas ossuary inscription

== See also ==
- Archaeology of Israel
- Religion in Israel
- Talpiot Tomb
- Basilica of Saint Paul Outside the Walls
