= Henri Bachelin =

French writer

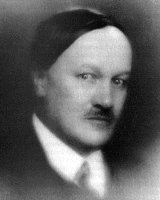
- Henri Bachelin in 1929
- Born: 27 March 1879; Lormes, Nièvre
- Died: 21 September 1941 (aged 62); Paris
- Occupation: Writer

Henri Bachelin (French pronunciation: [ɑ̃ʁi baʃlɛ̃]; 27 March 1879 – 21 September 1941) was a 20th-century French writer.

== Biography ==
After studying at the seminary of Nevers, followed by four years in the army, he practised the profession of bank clerk, which he abandoned in 1911 to devote himself exclusively to literature. He published about forty books, mostly novels and short stories, but also works of literary criticism and musicology. These are works centred on the painting of provincial life, like Sous d'humbles toits, Juliette la jolie or Le Village, where he depicts the countryside and villages of the Morvan with great realism. He was also the author of historical novels (L'Abbaye-Vézelay au XIIe siècle, La mort de Bibracte), novels of manners (Le Péché de la Vierge, La Vénus rustique) and training novels fed with autobiographical elements (L'Héritage, Le Chant du coq). He was awarded the prix Femina in 1918 for Le Serviteur, in which he pays homage to his father.

His interest in religious music was reflected in a novel (Les Grandes Orgues) and by a theoretical reference work (L'Orgue, ses éléments, son histoire, son esthétique) written in collaboration with Alexandre Eugène Cellier. In 1925 he was commissioned to prepare the edition of the "Journal" of Jules Renard, of which he had been a friend and a disciple at the beginning. He collaborated with numerous journals such as the Mercure de France and the NRF.

Although he went to Paris, where he frequented Charles-Louis Philippe, André Gide and Paul Léautaud, he was still very attached to his small native town. Lormes built a bust in his memory in front of the house where he spent his childhood. He left several unpublished manuscripts. The first volume of his "Journal" (written from 1926 to 1941) was published in 2009.

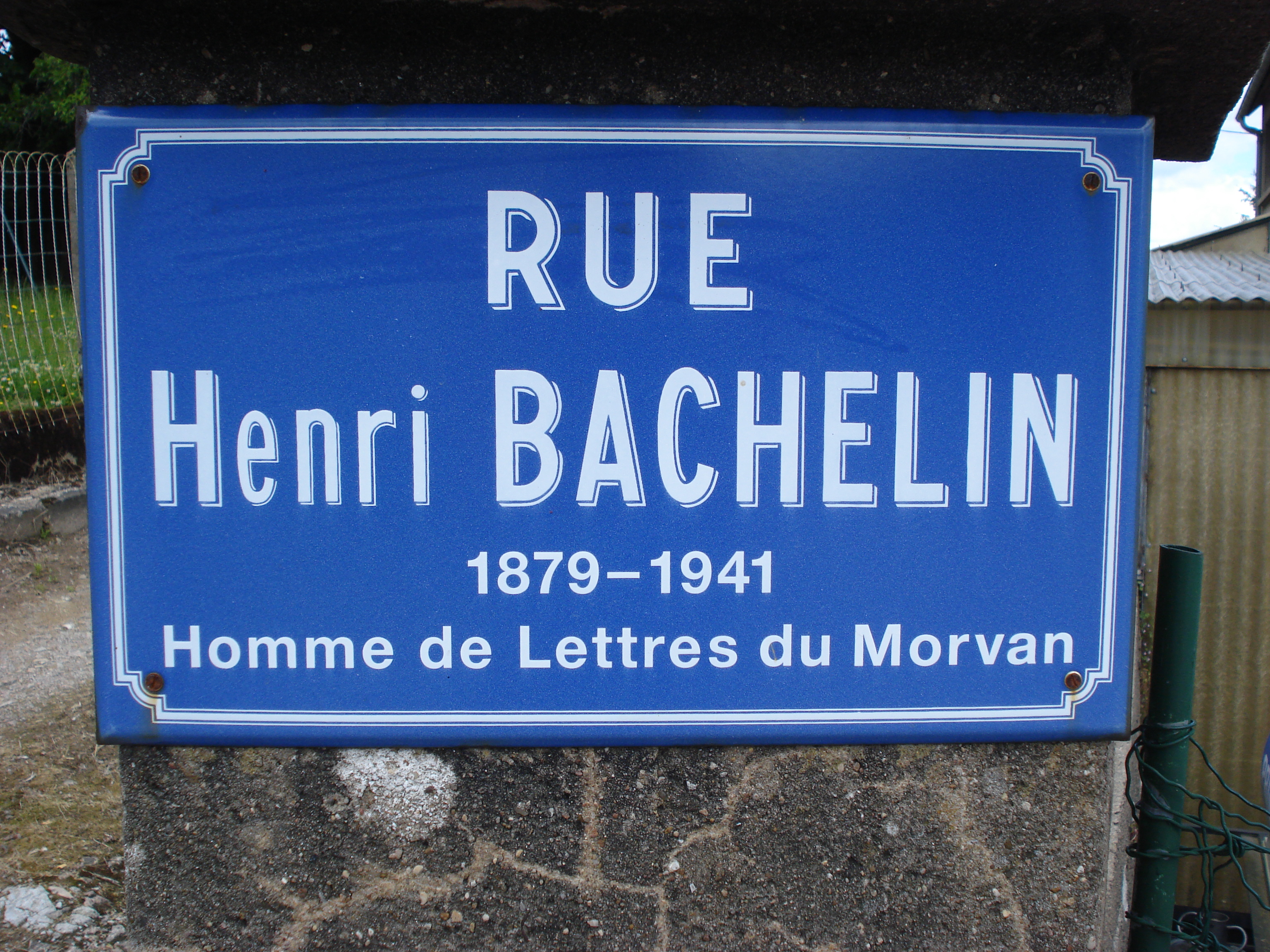
Montsauche-les-Settons, Rue Henri Bachelin

== Works ==
Poetry

- 1904: Horizons et coins du Morvan, Paris

Tales and short stories

- 1906: Pas-comme-les-autres
- 1907: Les Manigants
- 1910: Robes noires
- 1911: Les Sports aux champs
- 1913: Sous d'humbles toits
- 1917: La Guerre sur le hameau
- 1920: Sous les marronniers en fleurs
- 1999: Vieilles images d'un canton de France

Novels

- 1910: La Bancale
- 1912: Juliette la jolie
- 1914: L'Héritage
- 1918: Le Serviteur, Prix Femina
- 1918: L'Eclaircie
- 1919: Le Village, Prix Jean Revel
- 1919: Le Petit
- 1920: Le Bélier, la brebis et le mouton
- 1922: Les Rustres
- 1923: Le Chant du coq
- 1914: Le Péché de la Vierge
- 1925: Les Grandes Orgues
- 1925: La Cornemuse de Saulieu
- 1926: La Vénus rustique
- 1926: Dondon Juan
- 1927: La maison d'Annike
- 1927: Le Taureau et les bœufs
- 1927: L'Abbaye - Vézelay au XIIe siècle
- 1928: L'Eté de la Saint Martin
- 1929: L'Orage d'hiver
- 1930: La mort de Bibracte
- 1931: Le Sergent Valentin
- 1937: Monsieur Ildefonse
- 1938: Le Sabreur
- 1981: Les Parsonniers

Literary studies

- 1909: Jules Renard et son œuvre
- 1909: Gustave Flaubert
- 1926: J.-K. Huysmans. Du naturalisme littéraire au naturalisme mystique
- 1929: Charles-Louis Philippe. Son œuvre
- 1930: Jules Renard (1864–1910). Son œuvre
- 1945: Nos paysans d'après Jules Renard, précédé de Jules Renard en Nivernais

Musicology

- 1927: Les noëls français
- 1930: Les Maîtrises et la musique de chœur
- 1933: L'Orgue. Ses éléments, son histoire, son esthétique (in collab. with Alexandre Cellier)

Trivia

- 1941: P.-J. Proudhon, socialiste national (1809–1865)
- 1944: Collines et buttes parisiennes
- 1994: Correspondances avec André Gide et Romain Rolland
- 2009: Journal - tome I - 1926-1929 (éditions du Pas de l'Âne, Autun)

== Bibliography ==
- Jules Bertaut, Le roman nouveau (Paris, Renaissance du Livre, 1920)
- André Billy, La terrasse du Luxembourg (Paris, Arthème Fayard, 1945)
- Jean Drouillet, Pages choisies d'Henri Bachelin (Moulins, Crépin-Leblond, 1948)
- René Dumesnil, Préface à l'édition définitive du Serviteur (Mercure de France, 1944)
- Jean-Pierre Lacroix, Henri Bachelin : l’éveil, la réussite, l’isolement (Vents du Morvan, n°32, summer 2009)
- Maurice Le Blond, Henri Bachelin, poète et romancier du Morvan (lecture given in 1943 and published in L'Horizon de pourpre, n°18, 2000)
- André Pasquet, Deux romanciers morvandiaux : Henri Bachelin - Le marquis de Montmorillon (Autun, Impr. Taverne & Chandioux, 1939)
- Jean Séverin, Henri Bachelin ou le triomphe de l'oubli (Académie du Morvan, n°14, 1981)
- Jean-François Vacquer, À la découverte d'Henri Bachelin (Association H. Bachelin, 1996)
- Jean-François Vacquer, Le Morvan vu par Henri Bachelin (Académie du Morvan, n° 46-47, 1999)
- L'Horizon de pourpre, bulletin semestriel de l'Association Henri Bachelin (50 issues published from 1991 to 2016).
