= Simon Ganneau =

French sculptor and mystic (1806–1851)

Simon Ganneau, le Mapah
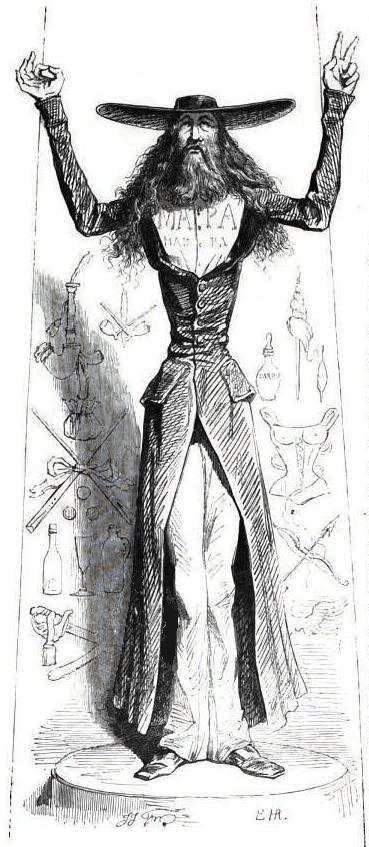
- Contemporary caricature (1846) by Jean Ignace Isidore Gérard Grandville, preaching in front of a relief of masculine (billiards, pipe) and feminine (corset, distaff) symbols.
- Born: circa 1805; Lormes, France
- Died: 14 March 1851; Paris, France
- Relatives: Charles Simon Clermont-Ganneau (son)

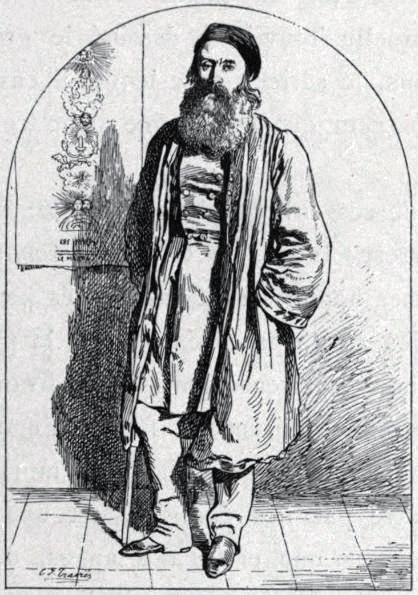
Ganneau, drawn in 1883 (after their death) by contemporary cartoonist Charles-Joseph Traviès de Villers, in front of a poster depicting the five phases of the world they preached would occur.

Simon Ganneau (Note: Also spelled Gannot or Gannau by some contemporaries, but always Ganneau by his closest followers.) (born circa 1805 in Lormes, died 14 March 1851 in Paris) was a French socialist, feminist, sculptor, and mystic.

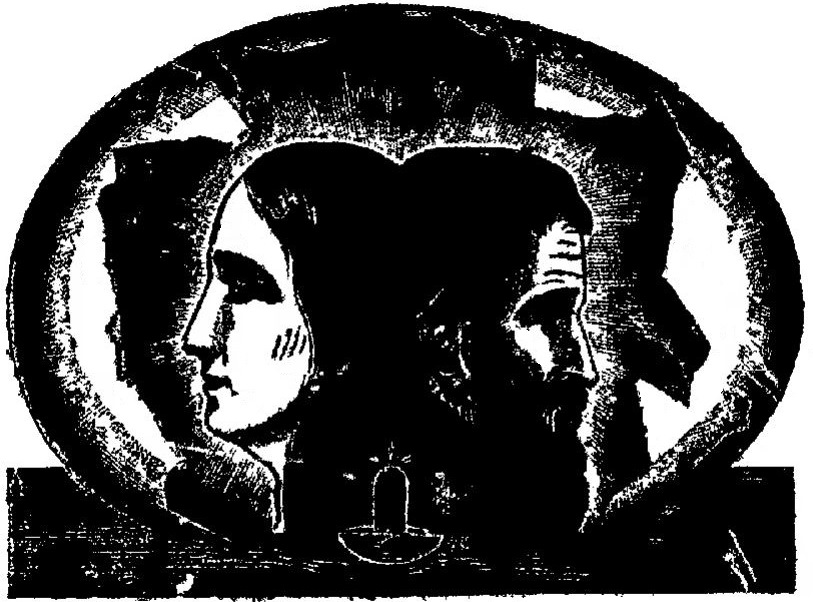
From one of Ganneau's brochures, an illustration of the androgyne Evadam, formed by the marriage of Mary-Eve and Christ-Adam.

Like several other socialists of their time, Ganneau treated Christianity as a call for social reform. They were influenced by Barthélemy Prosper Enfantin and Saint-Simonian philosophy, particularly in viewing God as androgynous or bisexual. Ganneau's writings treat androgyny not only as a move towards religious salvation, the final stage of humanity, but also as embodying the socialist concept on unity and balance in the world.

Adopting the title of the Mapah, a combination of mater and pater or maman and papa ("mother" and "father"), Ganneau presented themself as an androgynous prophet (with a beard and a woman's cloak) of a new religion called "Evadaism" (French: Evadaïsme) based on their ideas for "a redefined humanity, Evadam" (from Eve-Adam) and for a new era of female emancipation, gender equality and social justice. According to Éliphas Lévi, Ganneau also claimed to be the reincarnation of Louis XVII, and their wife claimed to be the reincarnation of Marie Antoinette.

As a sculptor and a former phrenologist, they spread their ideas via pamphlets and plaster figurines, "of strange appearance, without doubt symbolically bisexual", both called "plasters". Their garret studio apartment on the Île Saint-Louis in Paris functioned in the late 1830s as a salon for discussing their ideas, and they influenced many of the socialists and feminists of their time, including Alexandre Dumas, Alphonse Esquiros, Flora Tristan and Éliphas Lévi (Abbé Constant). Ganneau contributed to Tristan's 1844 collection The Worker's Union, as well as to an 1848 paper titled La Montagne de la Fraternité.

Ganneau had a wife and child, who was five when Ganneau died in 1851, whom Théophile Gautier took under his wing: the Orientalist and archaeologist Charles Simon Clermont-Ganneau.
