= Peace Forest =

Park in Jerusalem, Israel

Coordinates: 31°45′26″N 35°13′50″E

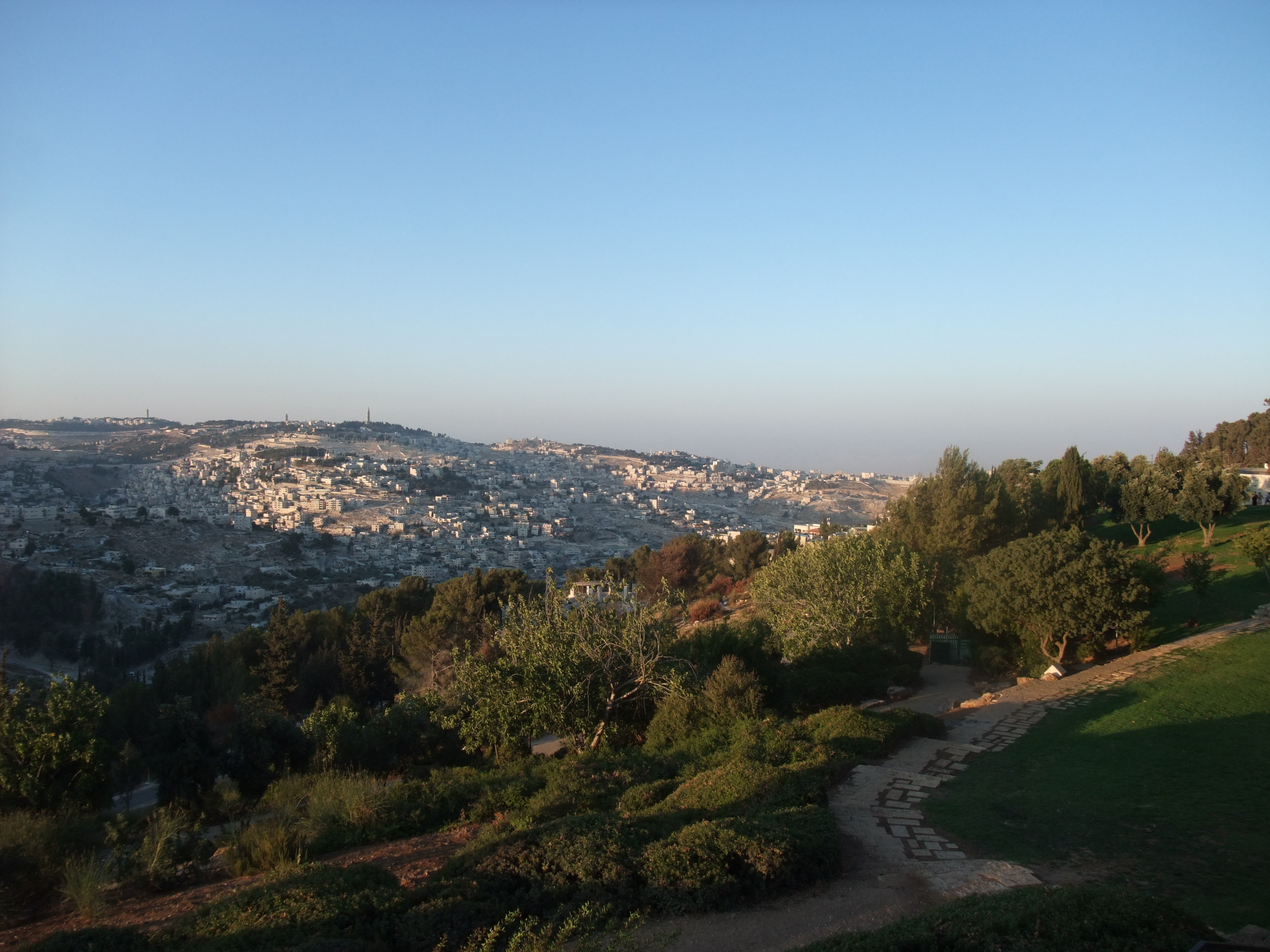
Peace Forest, Jerusalem

Peace forest is a forest in South - Southeast Jerusalem, between the Abu Tor neighbourhood and the Sherover Promenade.

The Peace Forest was planted on a site identified with the biblical Azal river mentioned in the book of Zechariah (Zechariah 14:5). There are a number of graves of the Second Temple era found in the Peace Forest, some of which have Hebrew inscriptions on them. In 1990, a grave with an Aramaic inscription "Joseph, son of Caiaphas" was found in the Peace Forest, which probably belongs to the High priest Caiaphas (see Caiaphas ossuary). The Peace Forest also contains remains of an aqueduct which supplied Jerusalem with water at a time of the Second Temple.

== Modern structures and sites in Peace Forest ==
As part of the events marking 3000 years of settlement in Jerusalem, the “Children of Israel Park” was established within Peace Forest, which included three observation structures overlooking the expanse of the forest from various perspectives, in recognition of Keren Kayemet supporters, and various communities of world Jewry. Each individually designed structure is characteristically composed of a “Gate" and "Tower” – that is, a large stone entrance gate leading to a lookout tower. Each such structure is named after a specific period of historical significance to Jerusalem. The name of each structure and the community who dedicated it are engraved in Hebrew and English on large stone monuments outside the "Gate" of each structure.

These three observation structures are integrated within a series of other points of interest in Peace Forest, along the Gedud 68 Road from north to south, as follows: The first location is “Broshim Lookout”. Just south is the first observation structure called, “Sha’ar Tekumat Yisrael”, whose dedication monument translates as the “Birth of the State of Israel”. Further south is the middle observation structure, “Sha’ar HaBayit HaLeumi”, whose monument translates as the “Jewish National Home”. Between, and to the east of, these two structures is the outdoor “Peace Amphitheater” (colloquially called the Amphi-HaShalom) in which summer evening concerts are held overlooking the light-studded Jerusalem skyline. The southern-most observation structure, “Sha’ar Yetzia m’HaChomot”, whose monument translates as “Jewish Life Beyond the City Walls”, commemorates the expansion and establishment of the modern city of Jerusalem. About 200 meters south are two remaining sites in the series, the “Chativat Yerushalayim [Jerusalem Brigade] Lookout” and just next to it the “Gadud [Regiment] 68 Memorial” commemorating the 76 soldiers of Regiment 68 of the Jerusalem Brigade who fell in battle at the Suez Canal during the Yom Kippur War.

Various Structures and Sites of Interest, Peace Forest, Jerusalem

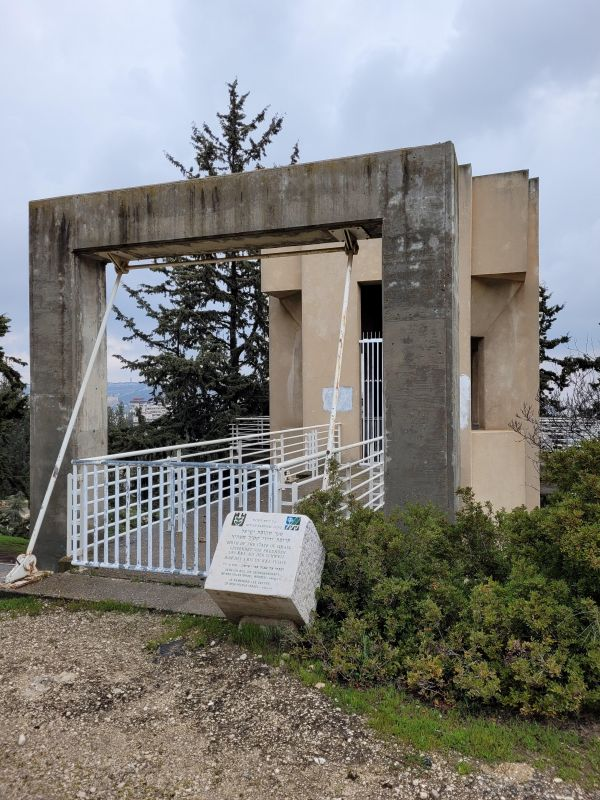
Sha'ar Tekumat Yisrael

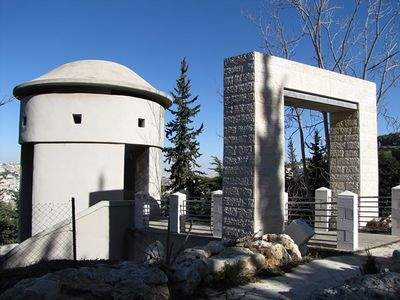
Sha'ar HaBayit HaLeumi

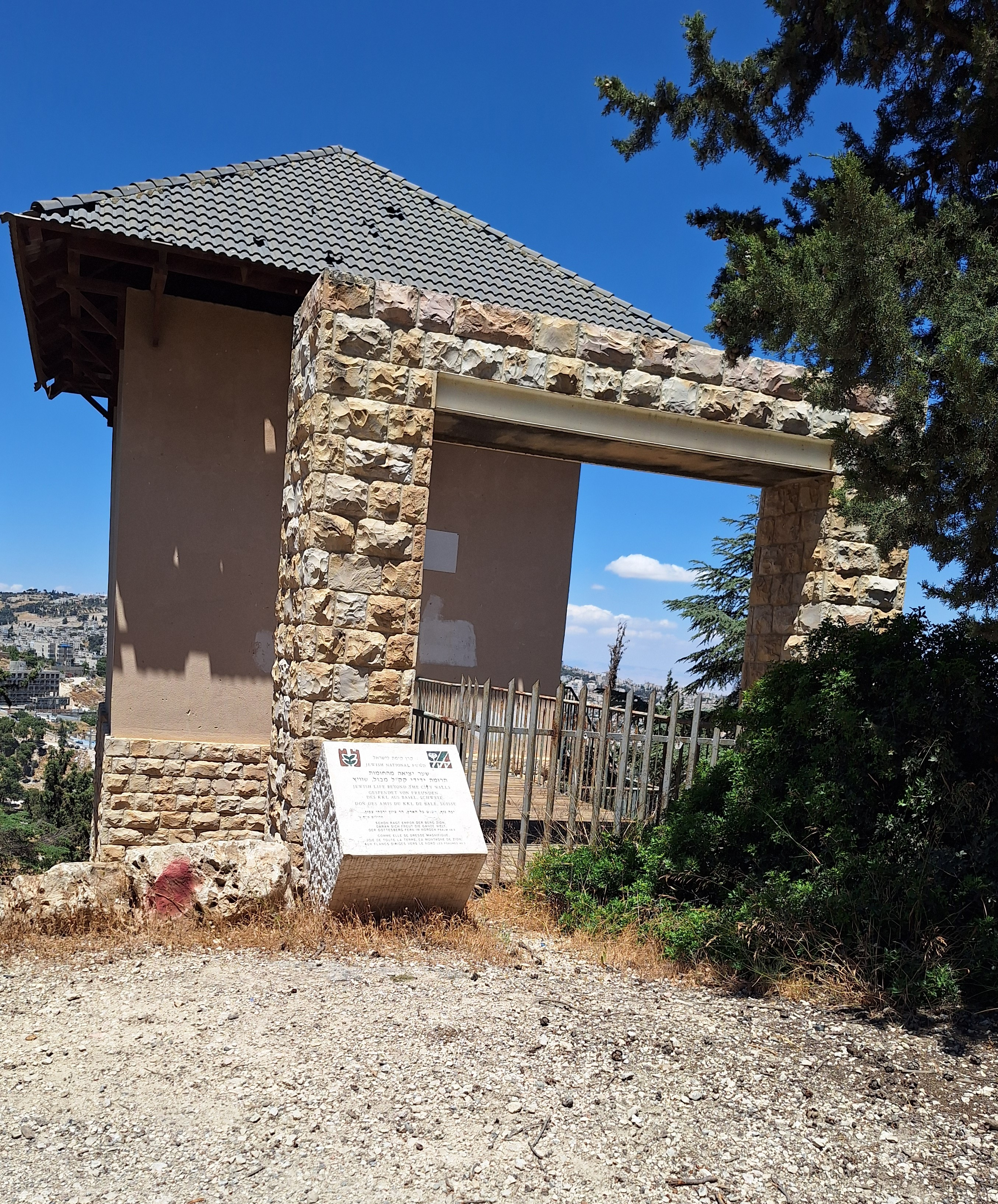
Sha'ar Yetzia m'HaChomot

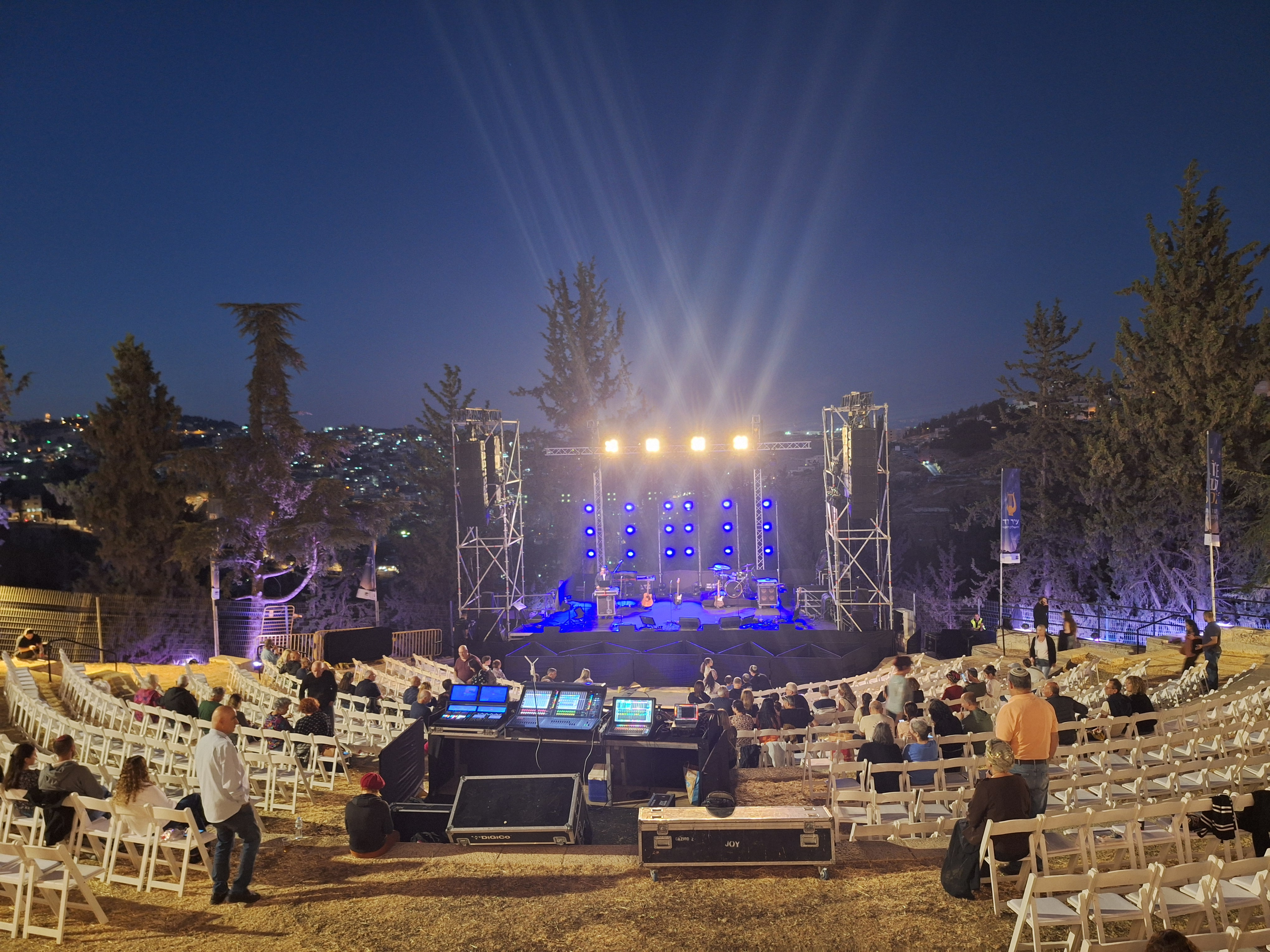
Amphi HaShalom

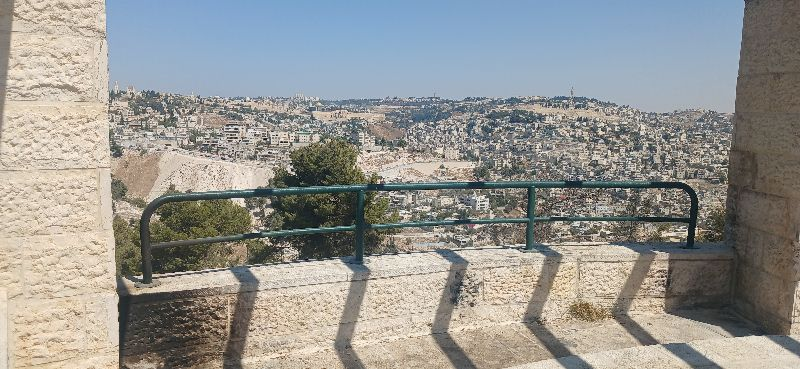
Chativat Yerushalayim Lookout

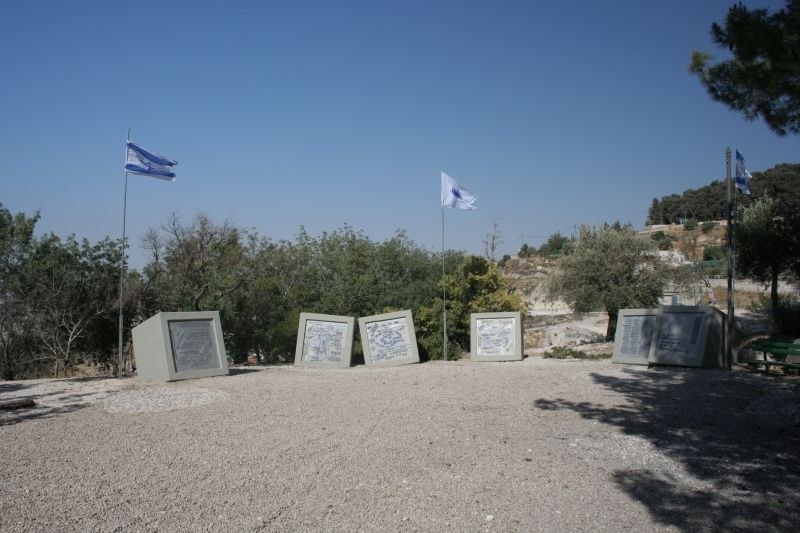
Regiment 68 Memorial

== See also ==
- List of forests in Israel
- Tourism in Israel
- Tourism in Palestine
