= Charles Simon Clermont-Ganneau =

French orientalist and archaeologist (1846–1923)

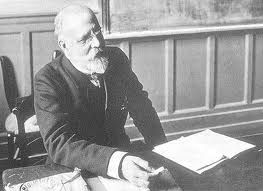
- Born: 19 February 1846; Paris, France
- Died: 15 February 1923 (aged 76)
- Known for: Orientalist and archaeologist
- Notable work: involvement with stele of Mesha (Moabite Stone), Palestine inconnue (1886), discovery of Azal (Zechariah 14:5)
- Movement: Middle Eastern archaeology
- Relatives: Simon Ganneau (father)

Charles Simon Clermont-Ganneau (19 February 1846 – 15 February 1923) was a noted French Orientalist and archaeologist.

== Biography ==
Clermont-Ganneau was born in Paris, the son of Simon Ganneau, a sculptor and mystic who died in 1851 when Clermont-Ganneau was five, after which Théophile Gautier took him under his wing. After an education at the Institut national des langues et civilisations orientales, he entered the diplomatic service as dragoman to the consulate at Jerusalem, and afterwards at Constantinople. He laid the foundation of his reputation by his involvement with the Mesha Stele (Moabite Stone), which bears the oldest Semitic inscription known.

In 1871, Clermont-Ganneau identified the biblical city of Gezer (Joshua 16:11) with that of Abu Shusha, formerly known as Tell el Jezer. In the same year he discovered the Temple Warning inscription in Jerusalem. In 1874 he was employed by the British government to take charge of an archaeological expedition to Palestine. Among his discoveries there was the rock-cut tomb of the Biblical Shebna. He explored/discovered many tombs in Wady Yasul, a valley immediately south of Jerusalem, which he claimed served as an auxiliary cemetery for Jerusalem at some ancient period(s). Based on geographic and linguistic evidence he theorized that this valley was Azal mentioned in Zechariah 14:5 in the Bible. He was the first to make archeological soundings at Emmaus-Nicopolis. He was subsequently entrusted by his own government with similar missions to Syria and the Red Sea. He was made chevalier of the Legion of Honour in 1875. After serving as vice-consul at Jaffa from 1880 to 1882, he returned to Paris as secrétaire interpréte for oriental languages, and in 1886 was appointed consul of the first class. He subsequently accepted the post of director of the École des Langues Orientales and professor at the Collège de France.

In 1889 he was elected a member of the Académie des Inscriptions et Belles Lettres, of which he had been a correspondent since 1880. In 1896 he was promoted to be consul-general, and was minister plenipotentiary in 1906.

=== Crusades against archaeological forgeries ===
In 1873, after the Jerusalem antiquities dealer Moses Wilhelm Shapira offered a set of Moabite artifacts (known as the Shapira Collection) for sale, Clermont-Ganneau attacked the collection as a forgery. In 1883, Shapira offered the so-called "Shapira Strips," fragments of ancient parchment allegedly found near the Dead Sea, for sale to the British Museum, which exhibited two of the strips. Clermont-Ganneau attended the exhibition, and was the first person in England to attack their authenticity. A more recent re-litigation of the case by contemporary scholars inclines against the grain of the 19th century verdict, reconsidering the case of the scroll with arguments that "challenge the consensus forgery narrative." Some learned opinions, at least, consider that the scroll may be authentic after all. In 1903 Clermont-Ganneau took a prominent part in the investigation of the so-called Tiara of Saitaferne. This tiara had been purchased by the Louvre for 200,000 francs, and exhibited as a genuine antique. Much discussion arose as to the perpetrators of the fraud, some believing that it came from southern Russia. It was agreed, however, that the whole object, except perhaps the band round the tiara, was of modern manufacture.

== Works ==
Clermont-Ganneau's chief publications, besides a number of contributions to journals, were:

- Palestine inconnue (Paris: Leroux, 1876)
- Mythologie Iconographique (Paris: Leroux,1878).
- L'Imagerie phénicienne et la mythologie iconologique chez les Grecs (Paris: Leroux, 1880)
- Etudes d'archéologie orientale (1880, etc.)
- Les Fraudes archéologiques en Palestine (Paris: Leroux, 1885)
- Recueil d'archéologie orientale (Paris: Leroux, 1885, etc.)
- Album d'antiquités orientales (Paris: Leroux, 1897, etc.)
- (1896): Archaeological Researches in Palestine 1873-1874, [ARP], translated from the French by J. McFarlane, Palestine Exploration Fund, London. Volume 1
- (1896): Archaeological Researches in Palestine 1873-1874, [ARP], translated from the French by J. McFarlane, Palestine Exploration Fund, London. Volume 2

== See also ==
- Cave of Nicanor
