= Abu Tor =

Neighborhood in Jerusalem

Coordinates: 31°45′49.1″N 35°13′57.5″E

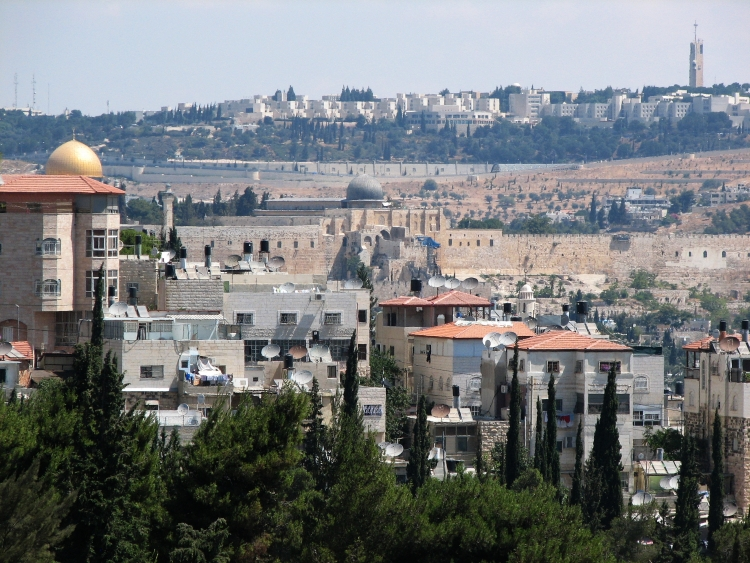
Abu Tor with view of al-Aqsa mosque

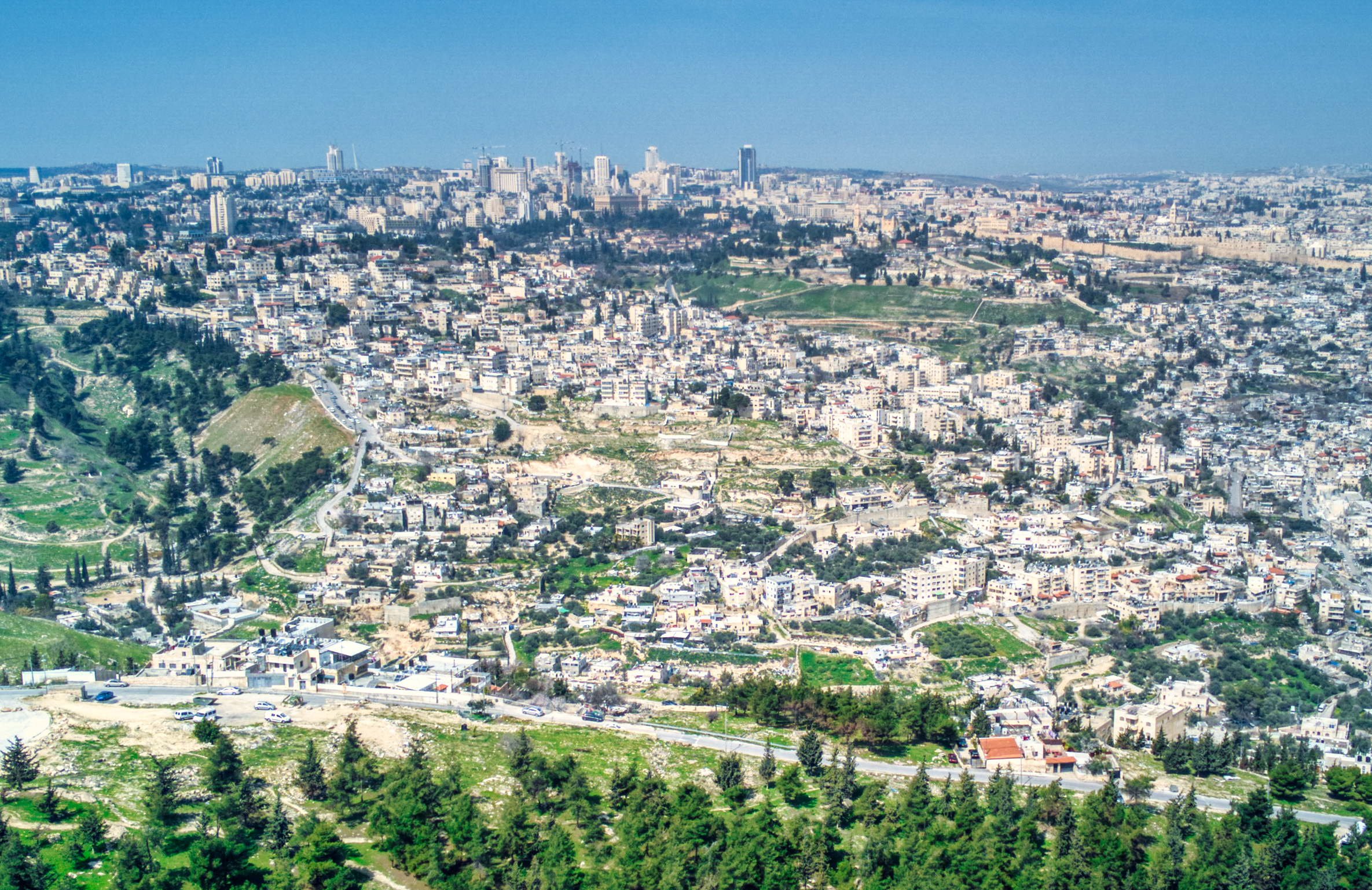
Abu Tor

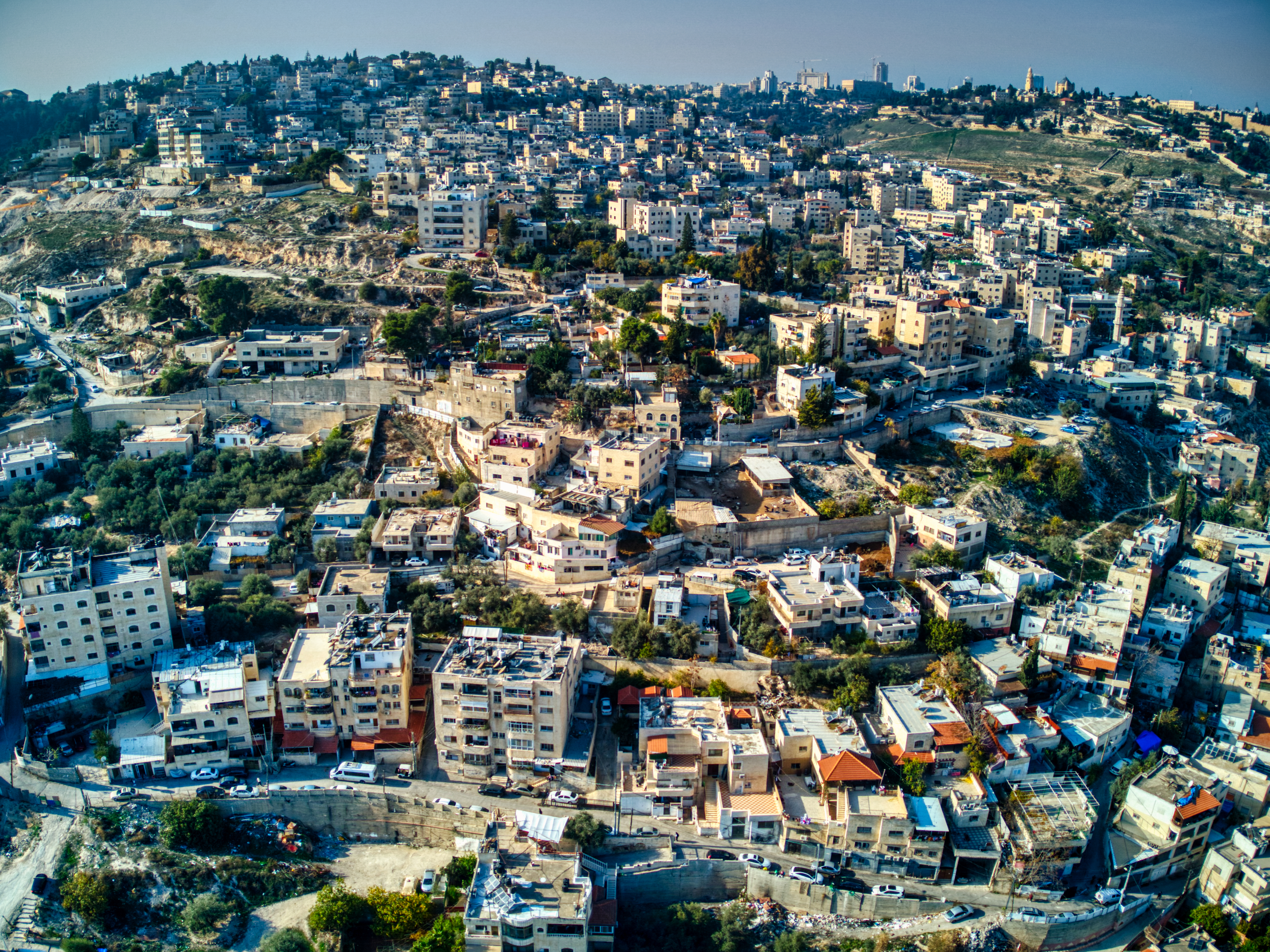
Lower Abu Tor

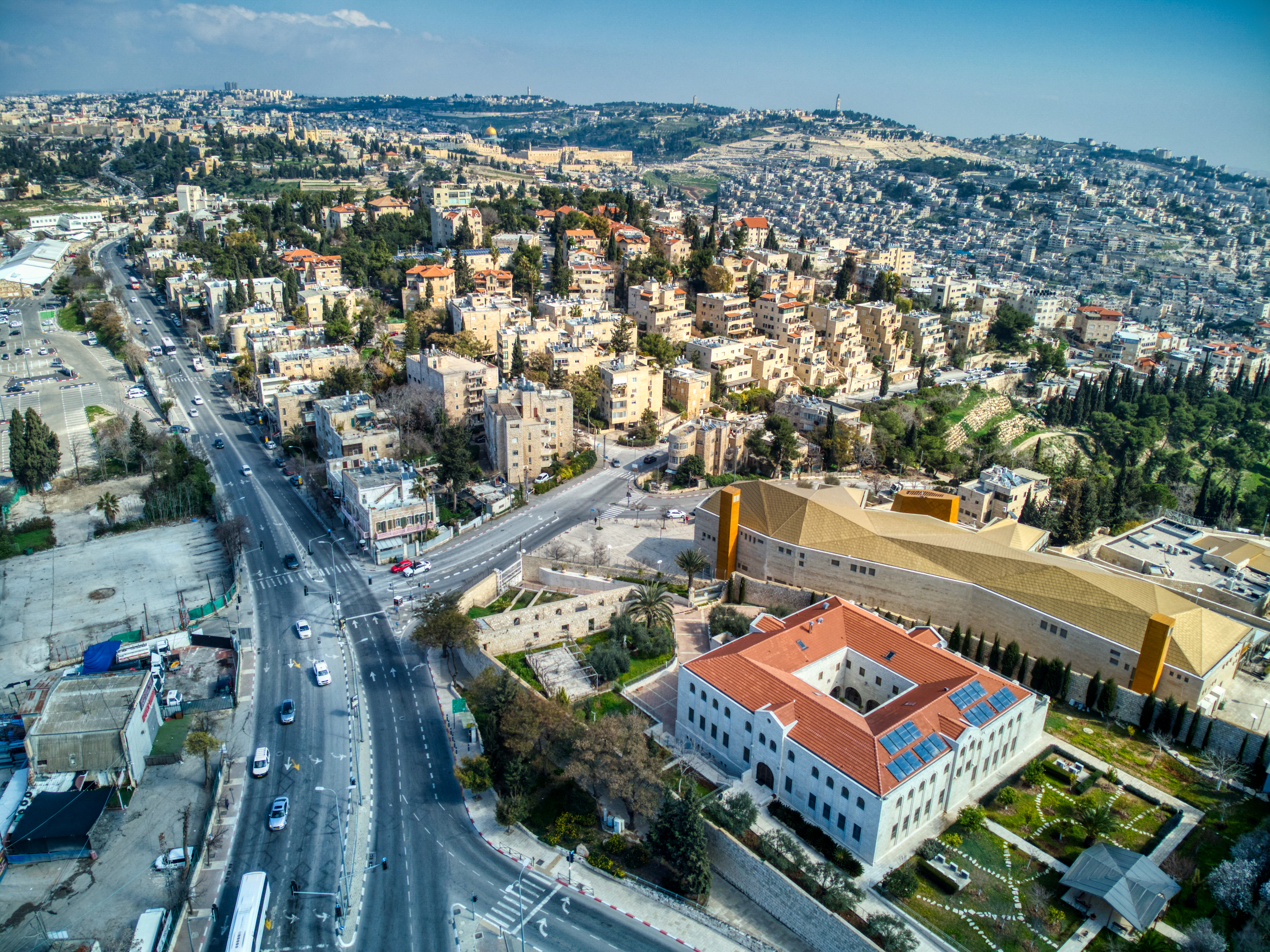
Upper Abu Tor

Abu Tor, also Abu Thor or ath-Thori, (Hebrew: אבו תור; Arabic: أبو طور or الثوري, lit. Arabic meaning "Father of the Bull"; In Hebrew also called גבעת חנניה (Giv'at Hanania), lit. "Hananiah's hill") is a mixed Jewish and Arab neighborhood in East Jerusalem, built on a prominence south of the Old City, Jebel Abu Tor. The traditional Christian name is Hill of Evil Counsel (see #Location).

== Geography ==
Abu Tor is bounded by the Valley of Hinnom on the north, by the Valley of Azal (Wadi Yasul/Nahal Azal) on the south, Hebron Road and the old Jerusalem Railway Station to the west, and the Sherover Promenade, Armon HaNetziv and Peace Forest to the south. The official Hebrew name of the neighborhood is Givat Hananya ("Hananya's Hill").

== Etymology ==
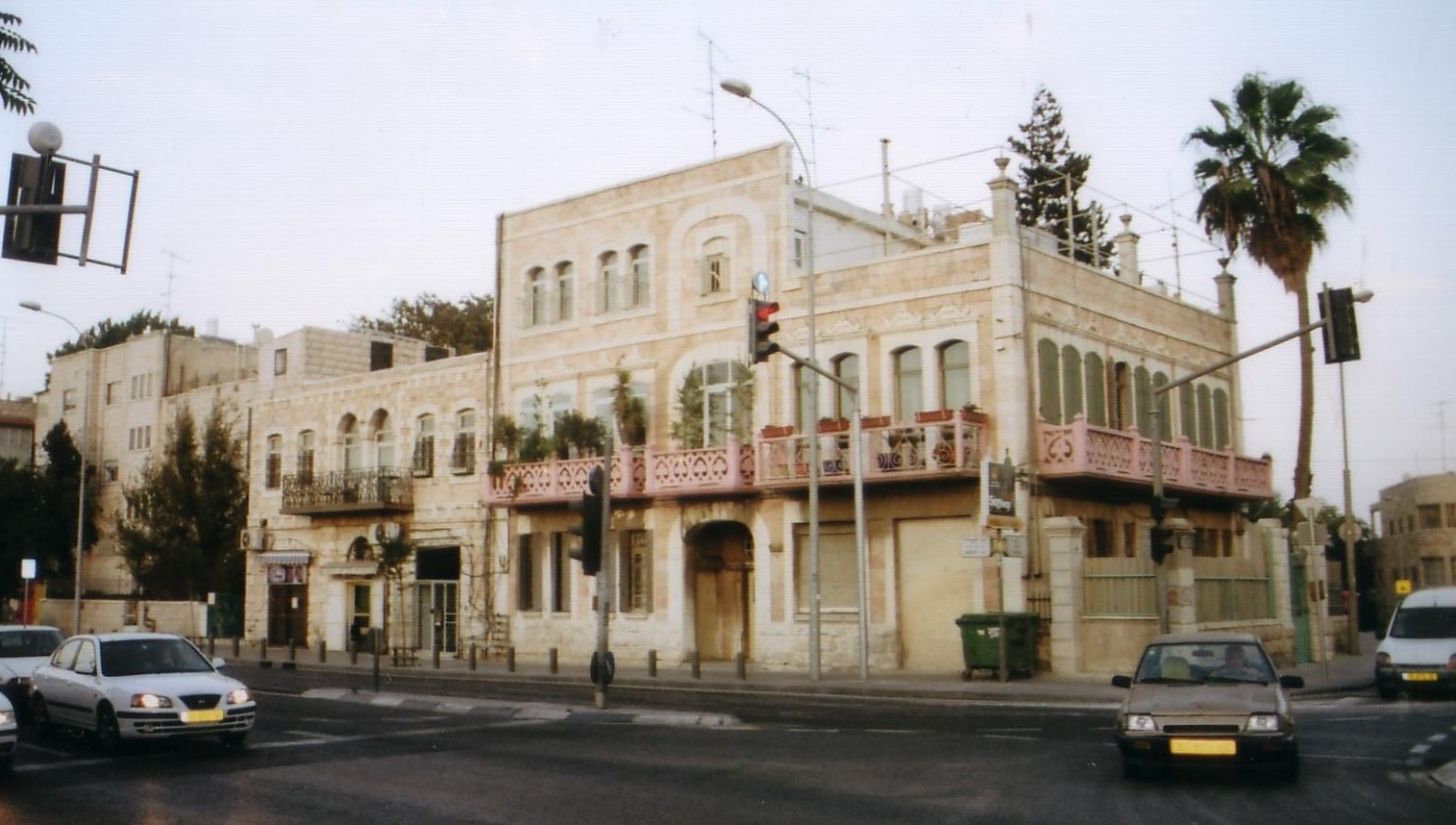
A house on Hebron Road, near Abu Tor

According to a traditional story, during the Ayyubid period after Saladin captured Jerusalem in 1187, the area of Abu Tor was assigned by Al-Aziz Uthman to an officer in Saladin's army. His name was Sheikh Shehab ed Din, but he was called "Sheikh Ahmed et Toreh" (Sheikh Ahmed of the bull) or "Abu Tor" (the man with the bull, or the father of the bull) as he was said to have accompanied Saladin riding on a bull.

== Location ==
The hill on which Abu Tor stands was called "Jebel Deir Abu Tor" (mountain of the monastery of Abu Tor), or the "Hill of Evil Counsel", referring to a legend that it was the site of the house of Caiaphas, where Judas plotted to betray Jesus. A monastery or convent dedicated to St. Mark (whose emblem was an ox) may have once been there.

== History ==
=== Late Ottoman to British Mandate period ===
Abu Tor was developed as a residential quarter in the late 19th century by Muslim and Christian Arabs from Jerusalem. A Jewish neighborhood called Beit Yosef was established in 1888.

Abu Tor was incorporated into the Jerusalem municipal district during the British Mandate period.

=== Israel and Jordan ===
From the establishment of Israel in 1948 until 1967, the border between Israel and Jordan ran through Abu Tor. The first four roads beyond Hebron Road were Israeli and the remaining roads were Jordanian. In January 1949, Israel and Jordan, represented by Moshe Dayan and Abdullah el-Tell, held talks on the status of Jerusalem. Dayan presented the partition of Jerusalem as a common interest, and offered an exchange of territories that included the military post in Abu Tor, but his offer was turned down.

== Demography ==
Abu Tor is one of the few Jerusalem neighborhoods with a mixed Arab and Jewish population. Due to its mixed population, many journalists, diplomats and United Nations employees choose to live there. While the Jewish section of Abu Tor is predominantly secular, the neighborhood has two synagogues - Har Refaim Synagogue for Ashkenazi Jews on Nachshon Street, and Shalom V'Achva Synagogue for Sephardi Jews. Abu Tor had a population of 15,500 in 2010.

== Urban development ==
A large multiplex cinema, the Sherover complex, is located in Abu Tor. The center, just off Hebron Road, houses seven movie theaters, coffee shops and restaurants, an auditorium, a library, classrooms and art galleries. The complex, which began operating in 2015, also screens films on the Sabbath.

== Bibliography ==
- Besant, Walter; Palmer, E.H. (1871). Jerusalem, the City of Herod and Saladin. London: Committee of the Palestine Exploration Fund. (p. 432)
- Canaan, Tawfiq (1927). Mohammedan Saints and Sanctuaries in Palestine. London: Luzac & Co. Archived from the original on 2019-05-16.
- Conder, C. R. (1877). "The Moslem Mukams". Quarterly Statement - Palestine Exploration Fund. 9: 89–103. (p. 100)
- Moudjir ed-dyn (1876). Sauvaire (ed.). Histoire de Jérusalem et d'Hébron depuis Abraham jusqu'à la fin du XVe siècle de J.-C. : fragments de la Chronique de Moudjir-ed-dyn.
- Nissenbaum, Dion (2016). A Street Divided: Stories From Jerusalem's Alley of God. St. Martin's Press. ISBN 978-1250072948.
- Palmer, E. H. (1881). The Survey of Western Palestine: Arabic and English Name Lists Collected During the Survey by Lieutenants Conder and Kitchener, R. E. Transliterated and Explained by E.H. Palmer. Committee of the Palestine Exploration Fund.
- Warren, Charles; Conder, Claude Reignier (1884). The Survey of Western Palestine: Jerusalem. London: Committee of the Palestine Exploration Fund.
