= Common ownership =

Economic arrangement

Common ownership refers to holding the assets of an organization, enterprise, or community indivisibly rather than in the names of the individual members or groups of members as common property. Forms of common ownership exist in every economic system. Common ownership of the means of production is a central goal of socialist political movements as it is seen as a necessary democratic mechanism for the creation and continued function of a communist society. Advocates make a distinction between collective ownership and common property (the commons) as the former refers to property owned jointly by agreement of a set of colleagues, such as producer cooperatives, whereas the latter refers to assets that are completely open for access, such as a public park freely available to everyone.

== Christian societies ==
Members of the Early Church of Jerusalem shared all their money and possessions (Acts of the Apostles, chapters 2 and 4). Inspired by the early Christians, many Christians have since tried to follow their example of community of goods and common ownership. Common ownership is practiced by some Christian groups, such as the Hutterites (for about 500 years), the Bruderhof Communities (for some 100 years), and others. In those cases, property is generally owned by a charity set up for the purpose of maintaining the members of the religious groups. Christian communists typically regard biblical texts in Acts 2 and Acts 4 as evidence that the first Christians lived in a communist society. Additionally, the phrase "To each according to his needs" has a biblical basis in Acts 4:35, which says "to the emissaries to distribute to each according to his need".

== In capitalist economies ==
Common ownership is practiced by large numbers of voluntary associations and non-profit organizations, as well as implicitly by all public bodies. While cooperatives generally align with collectivist and socialist economics, retailers' cooperatives in particular exhibit elements of common ownership, and their retailer members may be individually owned. Some individuals and organizations intentionally produce or support free content, including open source software, public domain works, and fair use media. Mutual aid is a form of common ownership that is practiced on small scales within capitalist economies, particularly among marginalized communities, and during emergencies such as the COVID-19 pandemic.

== In socialist economies ==
In this sense, the theory of the Communists may be summed up in the single sentence: Abolition of private property.

— Chapter II. Proletarians and Communists, Manifesto of the Communist Party

Many socialist movements, including Marxist, anarchist, reformist, and communalist movements, advocate the common ownership of the means of production by all of society as an eventual goal to be achieved through the development of the productive forces, although many socialists classify socialism as public ownership or cooperative ownership of the means of production, reserving common ownership for what Karl Marx and Friedrich Engels termed "upper-stage communism", or what other socialist theoreticians, such as Vladimir Lenin, Emma Goldman, and Peter Kropotkin, simply termed "communism". From Marxist and anarchist analyses, a society based on a superabundance of goods and common ownership of the means of production would be devoid of classes based on ownership of productive property.

Common ownership in a hypothetical communist society is often distinguished from primitive communism, in that communist common ownership is the outcome of social and technological developments leading to post-scarcity and thus the elimination of material scarcity in society. From 1918 until 1995, the "common ownership of the means of production, distribution and exchange" was cited in Clause IV of its constitution as a goal of the British Labour Party and was quoted on the back of its membership cards. The clause read:

To secure for the workers by hand or by brain the full fruits of their industry and the most equitable distribution thereof that may be possible upon the basis of the common ownership of the means of production, distribution and exchange, and the best obtainable system of popular administration and control of each industry or service.

== Antitrust economics ==
In antitrust economics, common ownership describes a situation in which large investors own shares in several firms that compete within the same industry. As a result of this overlapping ownership, these firms may have reduced incentives to compete against each other because they internalize the profit-reducing effect that their competitive actions have on each other. The theory was first developed by Julio Rotemberg in 1984. Several empirical contributions document the growing importance of common ownership and provide evidence to support the theory. Because of concern about these anticompetitive effects, common ownership has "stimulated a major rethinking of antitrust enforcement". Several government departments and intergovernmental organizations, such as the United States Department of Justice, the Federal Trade Commission, the European Commission, and the OECD, have acknowledged concerns about the effects of common ownership on lessening product market competition. Asset managers have disclosed these concerns as regulatory risks, with BlackRock stating in its 2023 annual report that the common ownership theory "purports to link aggregated equity positions in certain industries with higher consumer prices and executive compensation and lower wages and employment rates." In May 2025, the Federal Trade Commission and Department of Justice filed a statement of interest in Texas v. BlackRock, State Street, and Vanguard, asserting that institutional investors may face liability under Section 7 of the Clayton Act for using shareholdings in competing firms to restrict competition.

== Contract theory ==
Neoclassical economic theory analyzes common ownership using contract theory. According to the incomplete contracting approach pioneered by Oliver Hart and his co-authors, ownership matters because the owner of an asset has residual control rights. This means that the owner can decide what to do with the asset in every contingency not covered by a contract. In particular, an owner has stronger incentives to make relationship-specific investments than a non-owner, so ownership can ameliorate the hold-up problem. As a result, ownership is a scarce resource (i.e. there are limits to how much they can invest) that should not be wasted. In particular, a central result of the property rights approach says that joint ownership is suboptimal. If there is a start with joint ownership (where each party has veto power over the use of the asset) and move to a situation in which there is a single owner, the investment incentives of the new owner are improved while the investment incentives of the other parties remain the same; however, in the basic incomplete contracting framework, the suboptimal aspect of joint ownership holds only if the investments are in human capital while joint ownership can be optimal if the investments are in physical capital. Several authors have shown that joint ownership can actually be optimal even if investments are in human capital. In particular, joint ownership can be optimal if the parties are asymmetrically informed, if there is a long-term relationship between the parties, or if the parties have know-how that they may disclose.

== See also ==
- Collective ownership – Ownership of property by all members of a group
- Common land – Land owned collectively
- Common-pool resource – Type of good in economics
- Commons – Concept in political economics
- Commons-based peer production – Method of producing value
- Condominium (living space) – Form of ownership of real property
- Cooperative – Autonomous association of persons or organizations
- Creative Commons – Organization designing open copyright licenses
- Egalitarianism – School of thought favoring equality for all people
- Georgism – Economic philosophy centered on common ownership of land
- Geolibertarianism – Political and economic ideology integrating libertarianism with Georgism
- Libertarian socialism – Political philosophy
- Mutual aid (organization theory) – Voluntary exchange of resources and services for mutual benefit
- Open-source model – Publishing digital resources with their source files
- Post-scarcity economy – Situation in which most goods are available to everyone at little or no cost
- Property rights (economics) – Economics concept
- Public ownership – Ownership of industry, assets, or businesses by a public body
- Public property – Subset of state property for use of the public
- Religious communism – Form of communism that incorporates religious principles
- Rivalry (economics) – Property of economic goods
- anti-rival good – Economic good that has more total value when shared
- Sharing economy – Economic and social systems that enable shared access to assets
- Social ownership – Ownership of the means of production by society
- State ownership – Ownership of industry, assets, or businesses by a public body
- Tragedy of the anticommons – Type of resource coordination breakdown
- Tragedy of the commons – Overuse of a shared resource
- Usufruct – Legal right to use something without altering it
