= Acts of the Apostles =

Book of the New Testament

- ← Gospel of John Epistle to the Romans →
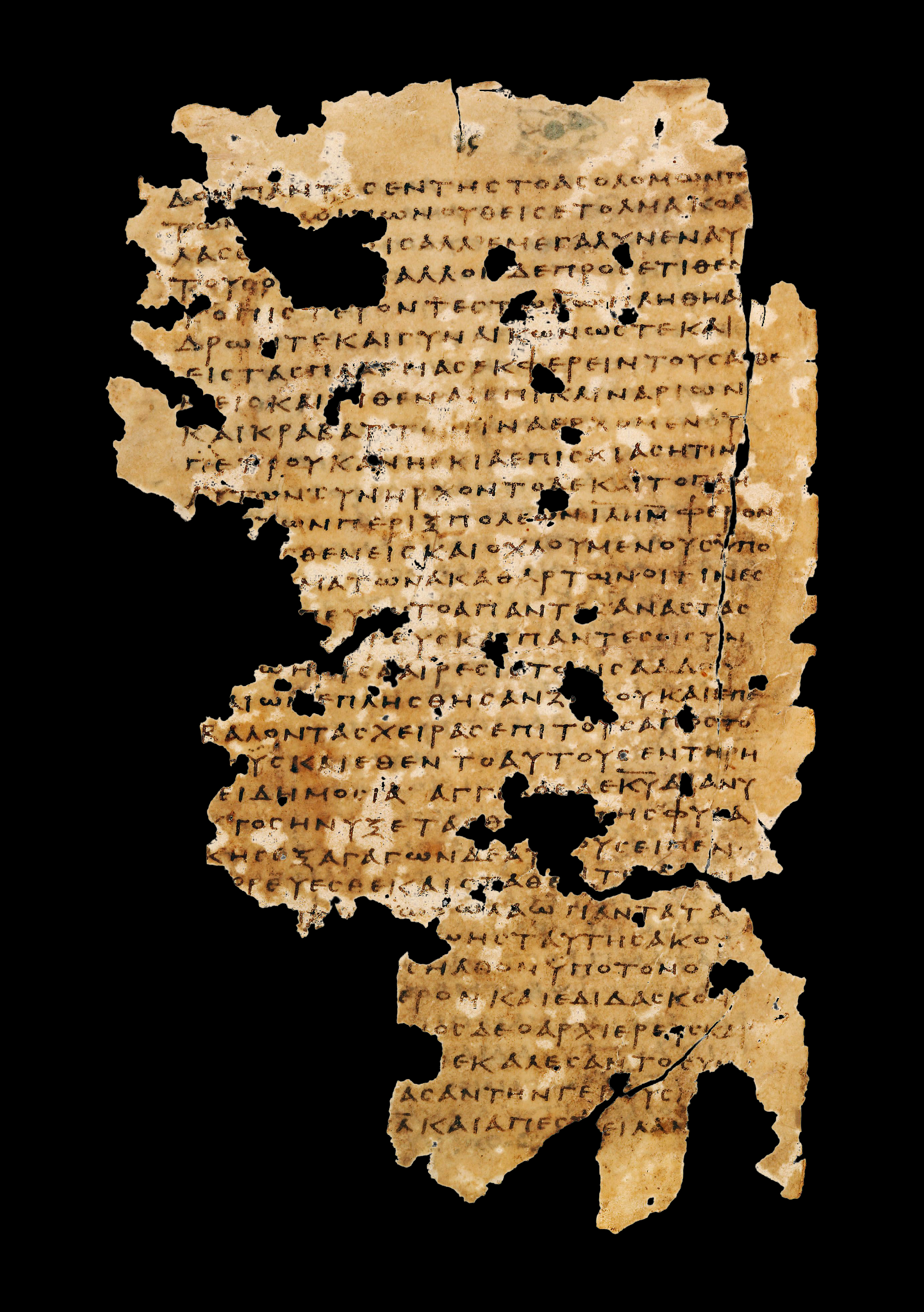
- Acts 5:12–21 on Uncial 0189 (verso; c. AD 200)

Information
- Religion: Christianity
- Author: Traditionally Luke the Evangelist
- Language: Koine Greek
- Period: c. 80–90 AD
- Chapters: 28

Full text
- Bible (Literal Standard Version)/Acts at English Wikisource

The Acts of the Apostles (Note: The book is sometimes simply called Acts (which is also its most common form of abbreviation).) (Koine Greek: Πράξεις Ἀποστόλων, Práxeis Apostólōn and Latin: Actūs Apostolōrum) is the fifth book of the New Testament. It recounts the founding of the Christian Church and the spread of its message across the Roman Empire. Acts comprises the second part of a two-volume work known as Luke-Acts with its predecessor, the Gospel of Luke.

Acts and the Gospel of Luke share the same author. Tradition identifies the writer as Luke the Evangelist, a physician who travelled with Paul the Apostle. The author is unnamed in the text but appears as a participant in the first-person-view verses of Acts 16-27. Critical opinion remains evenly divided about whether Luke the physician wrote it. Most scholars still regard the author of Luke–Acts as a companion of Paul, although others note tensions with the Pauline epistles. Most scholars treat Acts as historiography, though focus is more on the author's aims than on settling questions of historicity. The book is usually dated to 80–90 AD.

The Gospel of Luke depicts the life, death, and resurrection of Jesus of Nazareth. Acts continues the story of Christianity, beginning with the ascension of Jesus and the mission from Jerusalem into the wider Mediterranean world. The early chapters describe Pentecost, the shared life of the first believers, and the establishment of the church at Antioch. The later chapters follow Paul as he carries the message throughout the empire and conclude with his imprisonment in Rome as he awaits trial.

Luke–Acts addresses how the Jewish Messiah came to have an overwhelmingly non-Jewish church by arguing that the message reached the Gentiles after the Jewish rejection. The work also defends the Jesus movement for Jewish audiences, since most speeches respond to Jewish concerns while Roman officials arbitrate disputes about Jewish customs and law. Luke presents the followers of Jesus as a Jewish sect entitled to legal protection, but remains ambivalent about the future of Jews and Christians, affirming Jesus' Jewish identity while emphasizing the Jews' rejection of the Messiah.

== Composition and setting ==
=== Title, unity of Luke–Acts, authorship and date ===
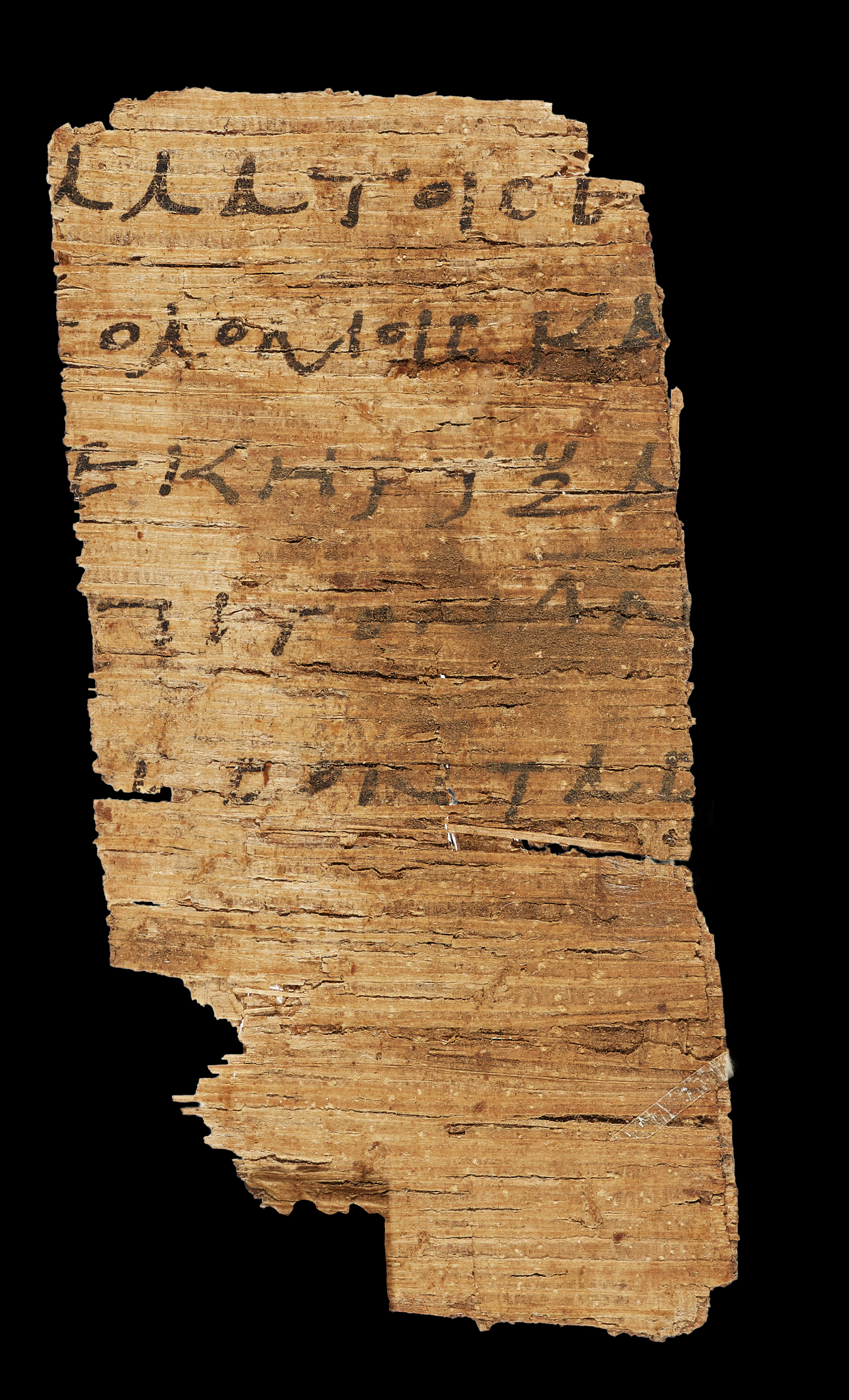
Acts 26:20 on Papyrus 29 recto (c. AD 250)

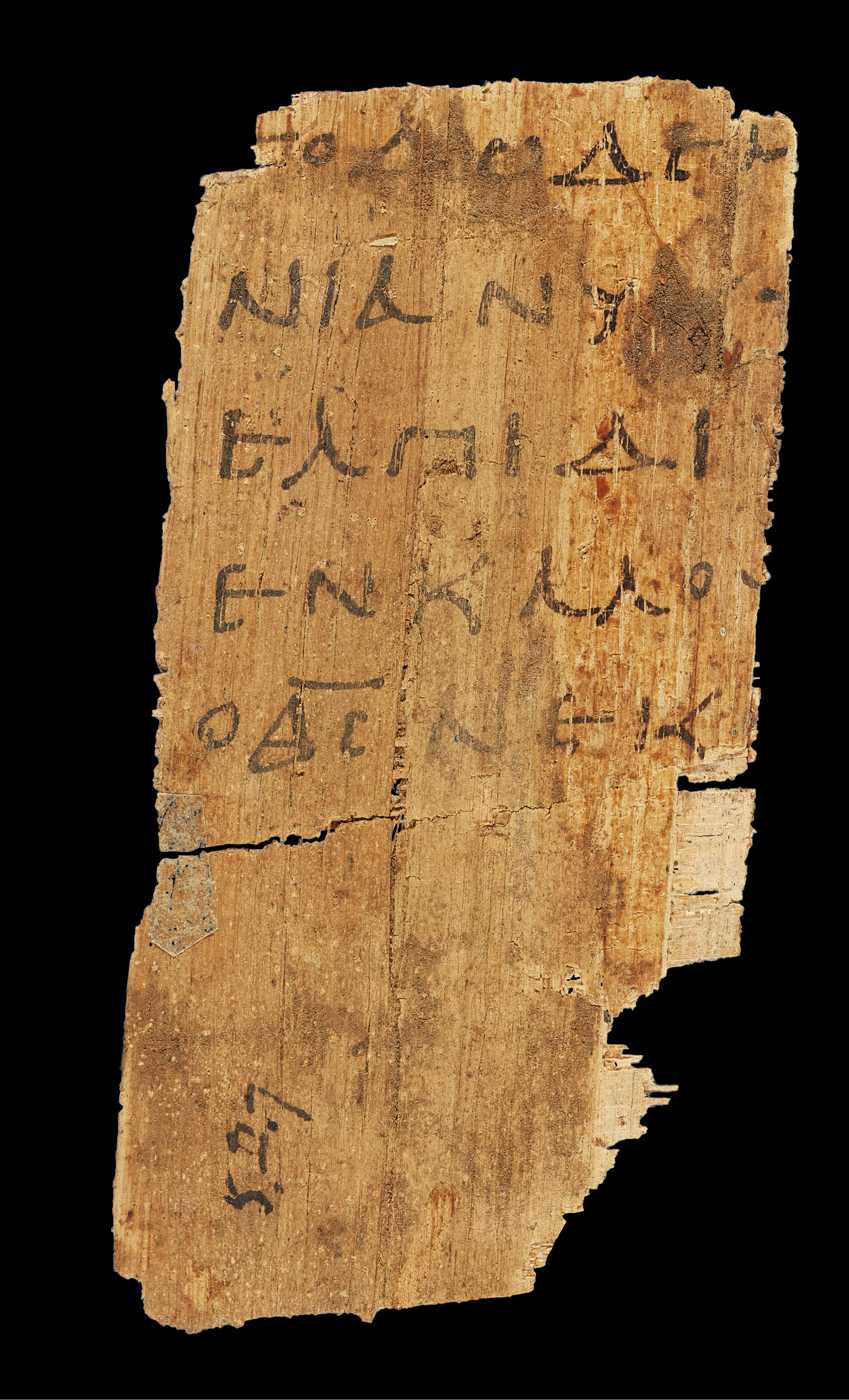
Acts 26:7–8 on its verso

The Gospel of Luke and the Acts of the Apostles make up a two-volume work which scholars call Luke–Acts. Together they account for 27.5% of the New Testament, the largest contribution attributed to a single author, providing the framework for both the Church's liturgical calendar and the historical outline into which later generations have fitted their idea of the story of Jesus and the early church. The name "Acts of the Apostles" was first used by Irenaeus in the late 2nd century. It is not known whether this was an existing name for the book or one invented by Irenaeus; it does seem clear that it was not given by the author, as the word práxeis (deeds, acts) only appears once in the text (Acts 19:18) and there it refers not to the apostles but to deeds confessed by their followers.

The shared author of the Gospel of Luke and the Acts of the Apostles was educated, a man of means, probably urban, and someone who respected manual work, although not a worker himself; this is significant, because more high-brow writers of the time looked down on the artisans and small business people who made up the early church of Paul and were presumably Luke's audience. According to Church tradition dating from the 2nd century, the author was Luke, named as a companion of the apostle Paul in three letters attributed to Paul. Critical opinion on the traditional attribution to Luke was assessed to be roughly evenly divided near the end of the 20th century. The author was not named in either volume, as was common for ancient biographies and histories, including Tacitus's Germania and Diogenes Laertius. Most scholars maintain that the author of Luke–Acts, whether named Luke or not, met Paul. The interpretation of the "we" passages as indicative that the writer was a historical eyewitness (whether Luke the evangelist or not), remains the most influential in current biblical studies. Objections to this viewpoint include the twentieth century consensus emphasized the differences in theology and historical narrative with the authentic letters of Paul the Apostle. Influential figures such as Philip Vielhauer cast doubt on the tradition, while B. H. Streeter argued that Luke could have known Paul without adopting his theology. More recent developments in interpretation find that Paul and the author of Luke–Acts are not as different theologically as previously thought. Support for the ecclesiastical tradition based on medical language in the Lucan corpus has been uncommon since Henry Cadbury's work.

The earliest possible date for Luke–Acts is around 62 AD, the time of Paul's imprisonment in Rome, (Note: Those who posit later dates consider early-dates as problematic, and propose theological reasons for Acts open ending, and challenge assumptions trying to harmonize Acts with Pauline chronology.) Most scholars date the work to 80–90 AD on the grounds that it uses Mark as a source, looks back on the destruction of Jerusalem, and does not show any awareness of the letters of Paul. Some contend that if it does show awareness of the Pauline epistles (argued to begin circulation in the late first century) or the work of Josephus, a date in the early 2nd century is possible. (Note: Others question the idea that the Pauline epistles were used by Luke as part of a collection or at a particular date.) However, many arguments mediate against this dating, such as the Gospel of John's awareness of the gospel, its independence from the Gospel of Matthew in the two-source hypothesis, and 1 Clement. Many scholars disagree with a late dating of Luke-Acts considering that it would be improbable that it would be written without any references to major events such as the burning of Rome, the first Christian persecution, or the destruction of Jerusalem and Acts concluding abruptly without any reference to Paul’s trial before Nero.

The historical Paul never mentions any "Luke the doctor", according to Bart Ehrman (since Colossians is not authentic). Scholars use the word "Luke" wantonly.

=== Manuscripts ===
There are two major textual variants of Acts, the Western text-type and the Alexandrian. The oldest complete Alexandrian manuscripts date from the 4th century and the oldest Western ones from the 6th, with fragments and citations going back to the 3rd. Western texts of Acts are 6.2–8.4% longer than Alexandrian texts, the additions tending to enhance the Jewish rejection of the Messiah and the role of the Holy Spirit, in ways that are stylistically different from the rest of Acts. The majority of scholars prefer the Alexandrian (shorter) text-type over the Western as the more authentic, but this same argument would favour the Western over the Alexandrian for the Gospel of Luke, as in that case the Western version is the shorter.

=== Genre, sources and historicity of Acts ===
The title "Acts of the Apostles" (Praxeis Apostolon) would seem to identify it with the genre telling of the deeds and achievements of great men (praxeis), but it was not the title given by the author, who instead aligned Luke–Acts to the 'narratives' (διήγησις diēgēsis) which others had written, and described his own work as an "orderly account" (ἀκριβῶς καθεξῆς). It lacks exact analogies in Hellenistic or Jewish literature. Balch compares Luke-Acts to the works of Dionysius of Halicarnassus, who wrote a well-known history of Rome, and the Jewish historian Josephus, author of a history of the Jews. Like them, he anchors his history by dating the birth of the founder (Romulus for Dionysius, Moses for Josephus, Jesus for Luke) and like them he tells how the founder is born from God, taught authoritatively, and appeared to witnesses after death before ascending to heaven. The author would have had access to the Septuagint (a Greek translation of the Jewish scriptures) and the Gospel of Mark. Advocates of the Two-source hypothesis argue that Luke knew the Q source, while a growing number of scholars defend either the Farrer hypothesis where Luke used Matthew without Q or the Matthean Posteriority Hypothesis where neither were used. He transposed a few incidents from Mark's gospel to the time of the Apostles—for example, the material about "clean" and "unclean" foods in Mark 7 is used in Acts 10, and Mark's account of the accusation that Jesus has attacked the Temple (Mark 14:58) is used in a story about Stephen (Acts 6:14). Although Frank Dicken views 1 Clement as dependent on Luke-Acts, most view this text as independent. Other sources can only be inferred from internal evidence—the traditional explanation of the three "we" passages, for example, is that they represent eyewitness accounts. By the mid-20th century no sources had been conclusively identified for Acts.

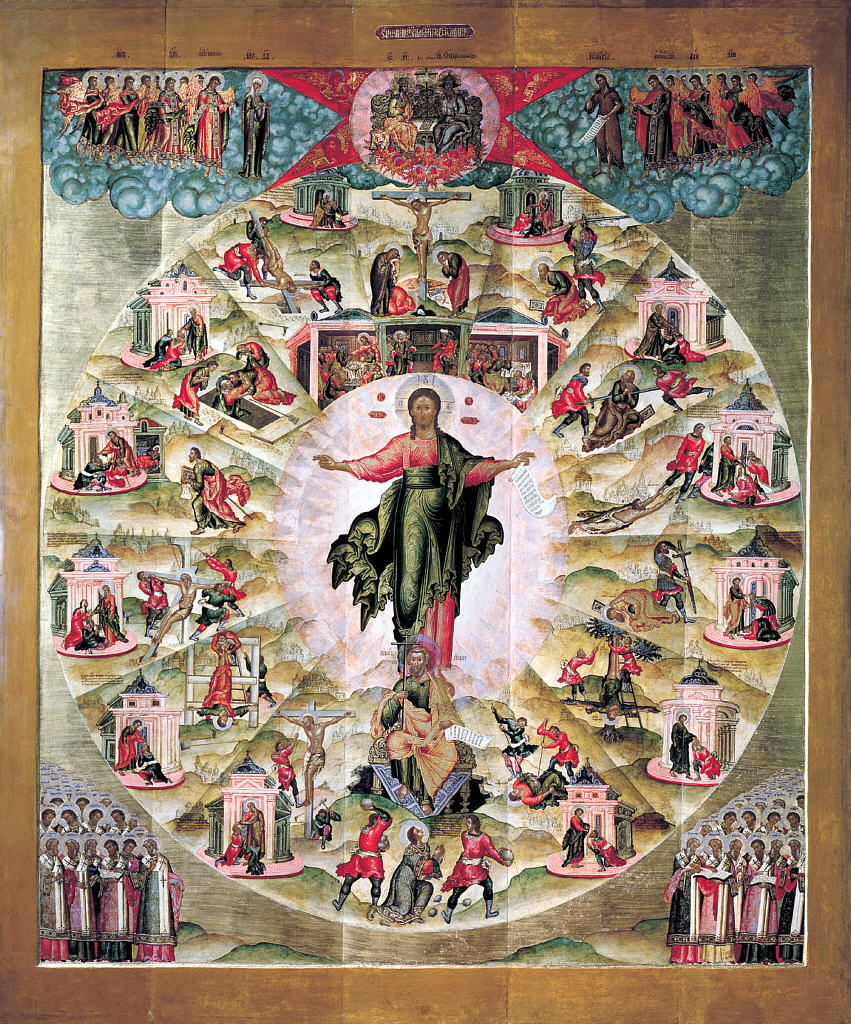
Ministry of the Apostles: Russian icon by Fyodor Zubov, 1660

Acts was read as a reliable history of the early church well into the post-Reformation era. Attitudes towards the historicity of Acts have ranged widely across scholarship in different countries. The debate on the historicity of Acts became most vehement between 1895 and 1915. The influential scholar Ferdinand Christian Baur suggested that the author had rewritten history to present a united Peter and Paul and advance a single orthodoxy against the Marcionites. Current scholarship offers varying views on the historicity of Luke-Acts, with many judging the overall text as adhering to the standards of Hellenistic historiography while acknowledging Luke’s theological agenda. A middle range of scholars see Acts as relatively reliable by standards used to evaluate Hellenistic historiography.

Most scholars believe that Luke intended his works to convey history. German scholarship as well as the Westar Institute was critical of the historicity of Acts as devotional literature with ideological goals, while English-speaking scholarship primarily viewed Acts as credible historiography. Richard Pervo described Acts as part of a fictionally novelistic genre, but most commentators continue to classify Acts within ancient historiography. However, most New Testament scholars view Luke-Acts as representing a form of historiography with a number of sub-genres under discussion, with other proposed genres including novel, epic, and ancient biography.

=== Audience and authorial intent ===
Luke was written to be read aloud to a group of Jesus-followers gathered in a house to share the Lord's supper. The author assumes an educated Greek-speaking audience, but directs his attention to specifically Christian concerns rather than to the Greco-Roman world at large. Although the composition of the audience remains disputed, most scholars agree Luke wrote for a mixed audience of both Jews and gentiles in the late first century. He begins his gospel with a preface addressed to Theophilus (Luke 1:3; cf. Acts 1:1), informing him of his intention to provide an "ordered account" of events which will lead his reader to "certainty". He did not write in order to provide Theophilus with historical justification—"did it happen?"—but to encourage faith—"what happened, and what does it all mean?"

Acts (or Luke–Acts) is intended as a work of "edification", meaning "the empirical demonstration that virtue is superior to vice." The work also engages with the question of a Christian's proper relationship with the Roman Empire, the civil power of the day: could a Christian obey God and also Caesar? The answer is ambiguous. The Romans never move against Jesus or his followers unless provoked by the Jews; in the trial scenes the Christian missionaries are always cleared of charges of violating Roman laws; and Acts ends with Paul in Rome proclaiming the Christian message under Roman protection. Despite the unfavorable depictions of the army prevalent in literature of the time, the role of the Roman military in Luke-Acts is particularly positive due to the function soldiers play in the Lukan narrative of gentile mission. On the other hand, Luke makes clear that the Romans, like all earthly rulers, receive their authority from Satan, while Christ is ruler of the kingdom of God.

== Structure and content ==
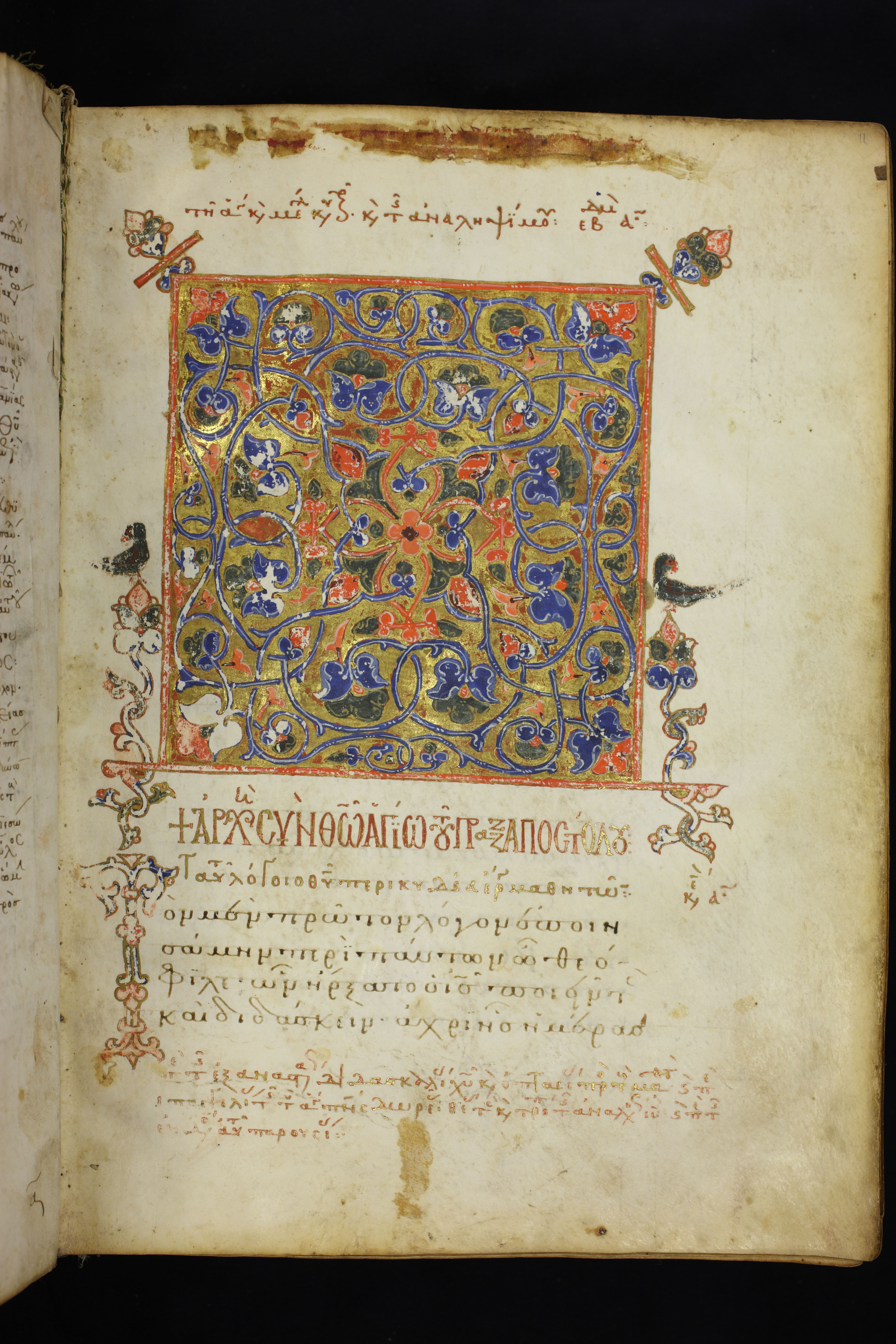
Acts 1:1–2a from the 14th-century Minuscule 223

=== Structure ===
Acts is divided into 28 chapters. Many scholars have noted the geographic movement from Jerusalem, centre of God's Covenantal people, the Jews, to Rome, centre of the Gentile world. This structure reaches back to the author's preceding work, the Gospel of Luke, though the move to Rome challenges the centrality of Jerusalem, an idea upheld by most Jews of the time. Paul has Rome as his destination, as Jesus had Jerusalem. The second key element is the roles of Peter and Paul, the first representing the Jewish Christian church, the second the mission to the Gentiles.

- Transition: reprise of the preface addressed to Theophilus and the closing events of the gospel (Acts 1–1:26)
- Petrine Christianity: the Jewish church from Jerusalem to Antioch (Acts 2:1–12:25)

2:1–8:1 – beginnings in Jerusalem
8:2–40 – the church expands to Samaria and beyond
9:1–31 – conversion of Paul
9:32–12:25 – the conversion of Cornelius, and the formation of the Antioch church

- Pauline Christianity: the Gentile mission from Antioch to Rome (Acts 13:1–28:31)

13:1–14:28 – the Gentile mission is promoted from Antioch
15:1–35 – the Gentile mission is confirmed in Jerusalem
15:36–28:31 – the Gentile mission, climaxing in Paul's passion story in Rome (21:17–28:31)

=== Outline ===
- Dedication to Theophilus (1:1–2)
- Resurrection appearances (1:3)
- Great Commission (1:4–8)
- Ascension (1:9)
- Second Coming Prophecy (1:10–11)
- Matthias replaced Judas (1:12–26)
  - the Upper Room (1:13)
- The Holy Spirit came at Shavuot (Pentecost) (2:1–47), see also Paraclete
- Peter healed a crippled beggar (3:1–10)
- Peter's speech at the Temple (3:11–26)
- Peter and John before the Sanhedrin (4:1–22)
  - Resurrection of the dead (4:2)
- Believers' Prayer (4:23–31)
- Everything is shared (4:32–37)
- Ananias and Sapphira (5:1–11)
- Signs and Wonders (5:12–16)
- Apostles before the Sanhedrin (5:17–42)
- Seven Deacons appointed (6:1–7)
- Stephen before the Sanhedrin (6:8–7:60)
  - The "Cave of the Patriarchs" was located in Shechem (7:16)
  - "Moses was educated in all the wisdom of the Egyptians" (7:22)
  - First mentioning of Saul (Paul the Apostle) in the Bible (7:58)
  - Paul the Apostle confesses his part in the martyrdom of Stephen (7:58–60)
- Saul persecuted the Church of Jerusalem (8:1–3)
- Philip the Evangelist (8:4–40)
  - Simon Magus (8:9–24)
  - Ethiopian eunuch (8:26–39)
- Conversion of Paul the Apostle (9:1–31, 22:1–22, 26:9–24)
  - Paul the Apostle confesses his active part in the martyrdom of Stephen (22:20)
- Peter healed Aeneas and raised Tabitha from the dead (9:32–43)
- Conversion of Cornelius (10:1–8, 24–48)
- Peter's vision of a sheet with animals (10:9–23, 11:1–18)
- Church of Antioch founded (11:19–30)
  - The term "Christian" first used (11:26)
- James the Great executed (12:1–2)
- Peter's rescue from prison (12:3–19)
- Death of Herod Agrippa I [in 44] (12:20–25)
  - "the voice of a god" (12:22)
- Mission of Barnabas and Saul (13–14)
  - "Saul, who was also known as Paul" (13:9)
  - called "gods ... in human form" (14:11)
- Council of Jerusalem (15:1–35)
- Paul separated from Barnabas (15:36–41)
- 2nd and 3rd missions (16–20)
  - Areopagus sermon (17:16–34)
    - "God...has set a day" (17:30–31)
  - Trial before Gallio c. 51–52 (18:12–17)
- Riot in Ephesus (19:23–41)
- Trip to Jerusalem (21)
- Before the people and the Sanhedrin (22–23)
- Before Felix–Festus–Herod Agrippa II (24–26)
- Trip to Rome (27–28)
  - called a god on Malta (28:6)

=== Content ===
The Gospel of Luke began with a prologue addressed to Theophilus; Acts likewise opens with an address to Theophilus, and its preface links it to both Luke's gospel and the biographical and historiographical approach of Luke 1.

The apostles and other followers of Jesus elect Matthias to replace Judas Iscariot as a member of The Twelve. On Pentecost, the Holy Spirit descends and confers God's power on them, and Peter and John preach to many in Jerusalem and perform healings, exorcism, and raising of the dead. The first believers collectively share property and worship together. Thousands of Jews consequently turn to the Jesus movement and follow Christ, but the followers of Jesus begin to be increasingly persecuted by Jewish leaders, reminiscent of Jesus in the Gospel. Stephen is accused of blasphemy and stoned. Stephen's death marks a major turning point: the Jews have rejected the message, and henceforth it will be taken to the Gentiles.

The death of Stephen initiates persecution, and many followers of Jesus leave Jerusalem. The message is taken to the Samaritans, a people held in hostility by the Jews, and to the Gentiles. Saul of Tarsus, one of the Jews who persecuted the followers of Jesus, is converted by a vision to become a follower of Christ (an event which Luke regards as so important that he relates it three times, similar to the repetitions in Jesus’ and Cornelius’ story). Peter, directed by a series of visions confirming God’s cleansing of formerly unclean gentiles, preaches to Cornelius the Centurion, a Gentile God-fearer, who becomes a follower of Christ. The Holy Spirit descends on Cornelius and his guests, thus confirming that the message of eternal life in Christ is for all mankind. The Gentile church is established in Antioch (northwestern Syria, the third largest city of the empire), and here Christ's followers are first called Christians.

The mission to the Gentiles is promoted from Antioch and confirmed at a meeting in Jerusalem between Paul and the leadership of the Jerusalem church. Paul spends the next few years traveling through western Asia Minor and the Aegean, preaching, converting, and founding new churches. On a visit to Jerusalem he is set on by a Jewish mob. Saved by the Roman commander, he is accused by the Jews of being a revolutionary, the "ringleader of the sect of the Nazarenes", and imprisoned. Later, Paul asserts his right as a Roman citizen, to be tried in Rome and is sent by sea to Rome, where he spends another two years under house arrest, proclaiming the Kingdom of God and teaching freely about "the Lord Jesus Christ". Acts ends abruptly without recording the outcome of Paul's legal troubles.

== Theology ==
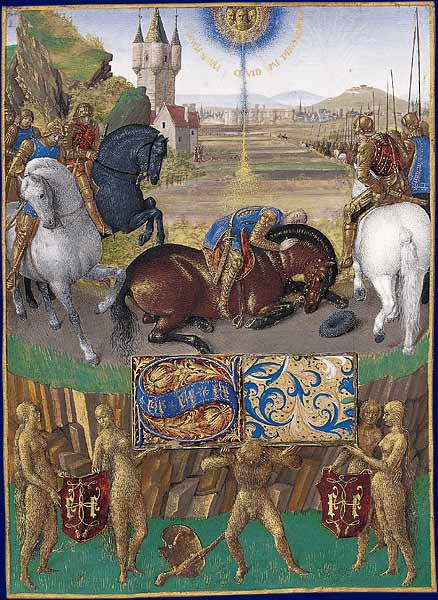
Paul's conversion, from Livre d'Heures d'Étienne Chevalier (c. 1450–1460), Jean Fouquet, in the Château de Chantilly

Luke–Acts is seen as a historical work, written to defend Christianity before the Romans or Paul against his detractors; today Acts is also recognized as having both historiographical and theological content. Luke's theology is expressed primarily through his overarching plot, the way scenes, themes and characters combine to construct his specific worldview. His "salvation history" stretches from the Creation to the present time of his readers, in three ages: first, the time of "the Law and the Prophets" (Luke 16:16), the period beginning with Genesis and ending with the appearance of John the Baptist (Luke 1:5–3:1); second, the epoch of Jesus, in which the Kingdom of God was preached (Luke 3:2–24:51); and finally the period of the Church, which began when the risen Christ was taken into Heaven, and would end with his second coming.

The author of Luke–Acts faced the apologetic issue of why most of the Jewish people did not adopt belief in Christ. Like Paul, Luke would not settle for anything less than the conversion of Israel, with the fulfillment of divine promise being contingent on Israel’s repentance. A central theme is that the message of Christ was sent to the Gentiles because the Jews rejected it. Some scholars have argued that Luke is against Israel itself, though others note that the Prophets and Qumranic texts display similar polemics. Jacob Jervell moved the consensus away from the view that Luke held unfavorable views on Judaism in 1972. The disciples preach in the order outlined: first Jerusalem, then Judea and Samaria, then the entire (Roman) world.

Jesus is depicted in Luke-Acts as an eschatological judge with divine authority as the messiah. The portrayal in Luke-Acts differs from other Jewish eschatological figures as the only one where Jesus is judge of living and dead, and the speeches in Acts 10 attribute to Jesus various points used in the Hebrew Scriptures to describe God’s uniqueness.

For Luke, the Holy Spirit is the driving force behind the spread of the Christian message at the beginning of the eschatological era, and he places more emphasis on it than any of the other gospels. Luke is the only evangelist who describes the coming of the Spirit at Pentecost on the first believers as a major event in salvation history. John the Baptist is also depicted as a prophet filled with the Holy Spirit, which provides him authority and the power to turn people to God. The Holy Spirit represents God's power, and not only inspires speech such as when the disciples are given speech to convert thousands in Jerusalem, but also provides experiential knowledge of Jesus and salvation.

One issue debated by scholars is Luke's political vision regarding the relationship between the early church and the Roman Empire. On the one hand, Luke generally does not portray this interaction as one of direct conflict. Rather, there are ways in which each may have considered having a relationship with the other rather advantageous to its own cause. For example, early Christians may have appreciated hearing about the protection Paul received from Roman officials against Gentile rioters in Philippi (Acts 16:16–40) and Ephesus (Acts 19:23–41), and against Jewish rioters on two occasions (Acts 17:1–17; Acts 18:12–17). Meanwhile, Roman readers may have approved of Paul's censure of the illegal practice of magic (Acts 19:17–19) as well as the amicability of his rapport with Roman officials such as Sergius Paulus (Acts 13:6–12) and Festus (Acts 26:30–32). Furthermore, Acts does not include any account of a struggle between Christians and the Roman government as a result of the latter's imperial cult. Thus Paul is depicted as a moderating presence between the church and the Roman Empire.

On the other hand, events such as the imprisonment of Paul at the hands of the empire (Acts 22–28) as well as several encounters that reflect negatively on Roman officials (for instance, Felix's desire for a bribe from Paul in Acts 24:26) function as concrete points of conflict between Rome and the early church. Perhaps the most significant point of tension between Roman imperial ideology and Luke's political vision is reflected in Peter's speech to the Roman centurion, Cornelius (Acts 10:36). Peter states that "this one" [οὗτος], i.e. Jesus, "is lord [κύριος] of all." The title, κύριος, was often ascribed to the Roman emperor in antiquity, rendering its use by Luke as an appellation for Jesus an unsubtle challenge to the emperor's authority.

== Comparison with other writings ==
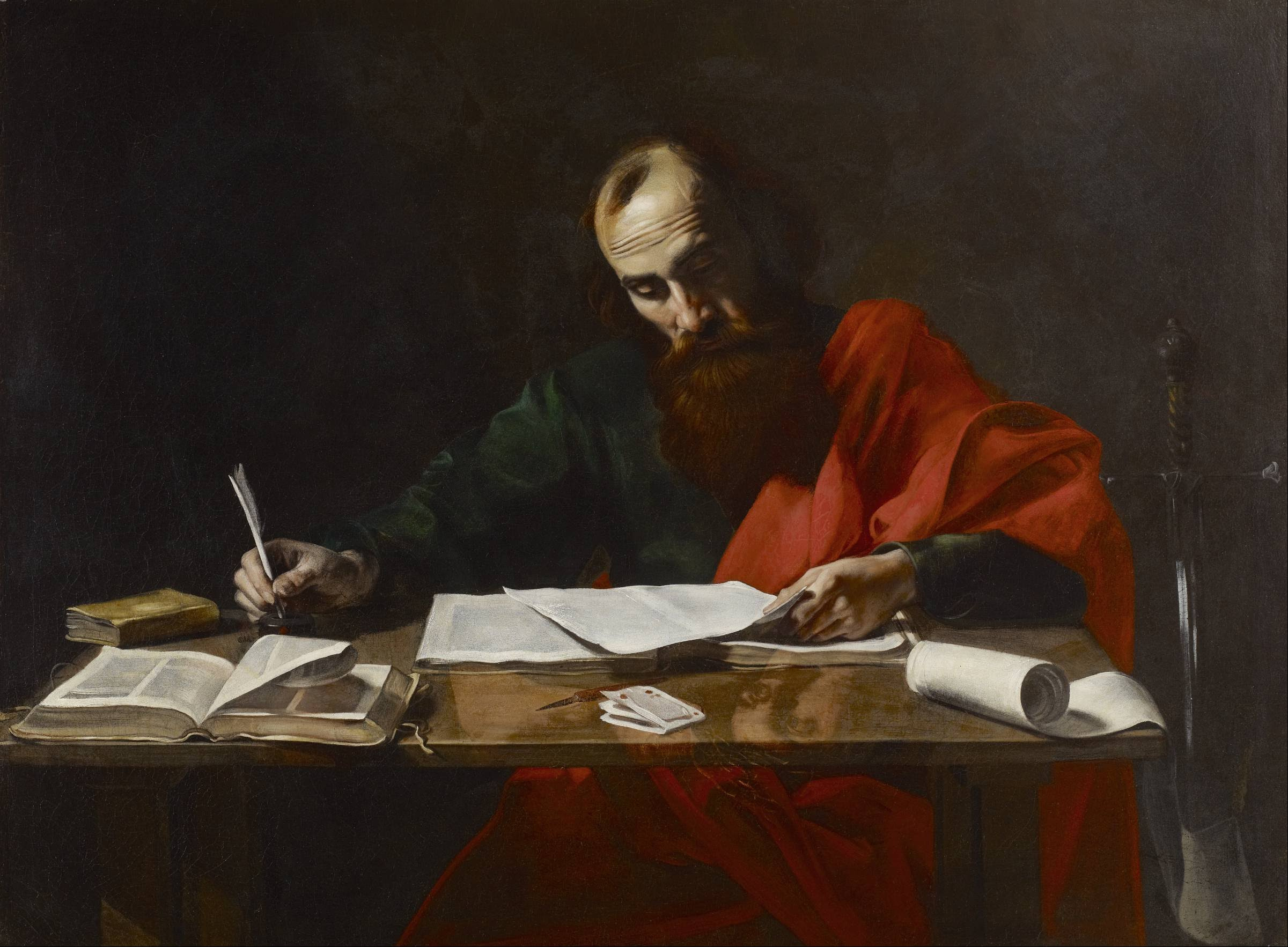
Saint Paul Writing His Epistles, ascribed to Valentin de Boulogne, 17th century

=== Gospel of Luke ===
As the second part of the two-part work Luke–Acts, Acts has significant links to the Gospel of Luke. Loveday Alexander notes that the preface of Acts can either be understood as signifying its status as the second volume of a unified work or more simply a cue to readers that it represents a sequel to the Gospel of Luke. Major turning points in the structure of Acts find parallels in Luke: the presentation of the child Jesus in the Temple parallels the opening of Acts in the Temple, Jesus's forty days of testing in the wilderness prior to his mission parallel the forty days prior to his Ascension in Acts, the mission of Jesus in Samaria and the Decapolis (the lands of the Samaritans and Gentiles) parallels the missions of the Apostles in Samaria and the Gentile lands, and so on (see Gospel of Luke). These parallels continue through both books, contributing to the narrative unity of the work.

However, apparent differences between Luke and Acts, such as the timing of the Ascension, have led to debates over the nature of the unity between the two books. While not seriously questioning the single authorship of Luke–Acts, Mikeal Parsons and Richard Pervo suggested a literary structure that balances thematic continuity with narrative development, leading them to consider Luke and Acts as independent though interrelated works, though Friedeman observes that their work has generally elicited more defenses of the consensus for the literary unity of Luke-Acts. Literary studies have explored how Luke sets the stage in his gospel for key themes that recur and develop throughout Acts, including the offer to and rejection of the Messianic kingdom by Israel, and God's sovereign establishment of the church for both Jews and Gentiles.

=== Pauline epistles ===
Acts agrees with Paul's letters on the major outline of Paul's career: he is converted and becomes a Christian missionary and apostle, establishing new churches in Asia Minor and the Aegean and compelling Gentile Christians to not obey the Jewish Law. There are also agreements on many incidents, such as Paul's escape from Damascus, where he is lowered down the walls in a basket. However, Acts also downplays Paul's problems with his congregations and attributes difficulties to the fault of the Jews instead, has a final offering to Jerusalem unmentioned in the letters, and differing details on Christology, apostleship, and incidents in Paul’s life. 21st Century interpretation argues that the Paul and the author of Luke–Acts are not as different theologically as previously thought. (Note: In the meantime, however, a change both in the interpretation of Paul and in the interpretation of Luke has led to the insight that the two authors are not as far from each other theologically as has long been assumed (cf. e.g., Porter 1999 and, more recently, the essays in Marguerat 2009).)

== See also ==
- Les Actes des Apotres
- Acts of the Apostles (genre)
- Historical reliability of the Acts of the Apostles
- Holy Spirit in the Acts of the Apostles
- List of Gospels
- List of New Testament verses not included in modern English translations
- The Lost Chapter of the Acts of the Apostles, also known as the Sonnini Manuscript
- Textual variants in the Acts of the Apostles

== Sources ==
- Allen, O. Wesley Jr. (2009). "Luke". In Petersen, David L.; O'Day, Gail R. (eds.). Theological Bible Commentary. Westminster John Knox Press. ISBN 978-1-61164-030-4.
- Aune, David E. (1988). The New Testament in its Literary Environment. Westminster John Knox Press. ISBN 978-0-227-67910-4.
- Balch, David L. (2003). "Luke". In Dunn, James D. G.; Rogerson, John William (eds.). Eerdmans Commentary on the Bible. Eerdmans. ISBN 978-0-8028-3711-0.
- Boring, M. Eugene (2012). An Introduction to the New Testament: History, Literature, Theology. Westminster John Knox Press. ISBN 978-0-664-25592-3.
- Bruce, F.F. (1990). The Acts of the Apostles: The Greek Text with Introduction and Commentary (Third ed.). William B. Eerdmans Publishing Company. ISBN 978-0-8028-0966-7.
- Buckwalter, Douglas (1996). The Character and Purpose of Luke's Christology. Cambridge University Press. ISBN 978-0-521-56180-8.
- Burkett, Delbert (2002). An Introduction to the New Testament and the Origins of Christianity. Cambridge University Press. ISBN 978-0-521-00720-7.
- Evans, Craig A. (2011). Luke. Baker Books. ISBN 978-1-4412-3652-4.
- Fitzmyer, Joseph A. (1998). The Anchor Bible: The Acts of the Apostles-A new Translation with Introduction and Commentary. Doubleday. ISBN 978-0-385-49020-7.
- Green, Joel (1995). The Theology of the Gospel of Luke. Cambridge University Press. ISBN 978-0521469326.
- Green, Joel (1997). The Gospel of Luke. William B. Eerdmans Publishing Company. ISBN 9780802823151.
- Holladay, Carl R. (2011). A Critical Introduction to the New Testament: Interpreting the Message and Meaning of Jesus Christ. Abingdon Press. ISBN 9781426748288.
- Matthews, Christopher R. (2011). "Acts of the Apostles". In Coogan, Michael D. (ed.). The Oxford Encyclopedia of the Books of the Bible. Oxford University Press. ISBN 9780195377378.
- Nickle, Keith Fullerton (1 January 2001). The Synoptic Gospels: An Introduction. Westminster John Knox Press. ISBN 978-0-664-22349-6.
- Parsons, Mikeal C.; Pervo, Richard I. (1993). Rethinking the Unity of Luke and Acts. Fortress Press. ISBN 978-1-4514-1701-2.
- Perkins, Pheme (1998). "The Synoptic Gospels and the Acts of the Apostles: Telling the Christian Story". In Barton, John (ed.). The Cambridge Companion to Biblical Interpretation. Westminster John Knox Press. ISBN 978-0-521-48593-7.
- Phillips, Thomas E. (2009). Paul, His Letters, and Acts. Baker Academic. ISBN 978-1-4412-4194-8.
- Pickett, Raymond (2011). "Luke and Empire: An Introduction". In Rhoads, David; Esterline, David; Lee, Jae Won (eds.). Luke–Acts and Empire: Essays in Honor of Robert L. Brawley. Wipf and Stock Publishers. ISBN 9781608990986.
- Powell, Mark Allan (2018). Introducing the New Testament: A Historical, Literary and Theological Survey (2nd ed.). Baker Academic. ISBN 978-1-4934-1313-3.
- Rowe, C. Kavin (2005). "Luke–Acts and the Imperial Cult: A Way through the Conundrum?". Journal for the Study of the New Testament. 27 (3): 279–300. doi:10.1177/0142064X05052507. S2CID 162896700.
- Theissen, Gerd; Merz, Annette (1998). The historical Jesus: a comprehensive guide. Eerdmans.
- Thompson, Richard P. (2010). "Luke-Acts: The Gospel of Luke and the Acts of the Apostles". In Aune, David E. (ed.). The Blackwell Companion to The New Testament. Wiley–Blackwell. ISBN 978-1-4443-1894-4.
- Witherington, Ben (1998). The Acts of the Apostles: A Socio-rhetorical Commentary. Eerdmans. ISBN 978-0-8028-4501-6.
- Zwiep, Arie W. (2010). Christ, the Spirit and the Community of God: Essays on the Acts of the Apostles. Mohr Siebeck. ISBN 978-3-16-150675-8.

Acts of the Apostles Acts of the Apostles
Preceded by Gospel of John	New Testament; Books of the Bible	Succeeded by Paul's Epistle to the Romans
