= Holy Spirit in the Acts of the Apostles =

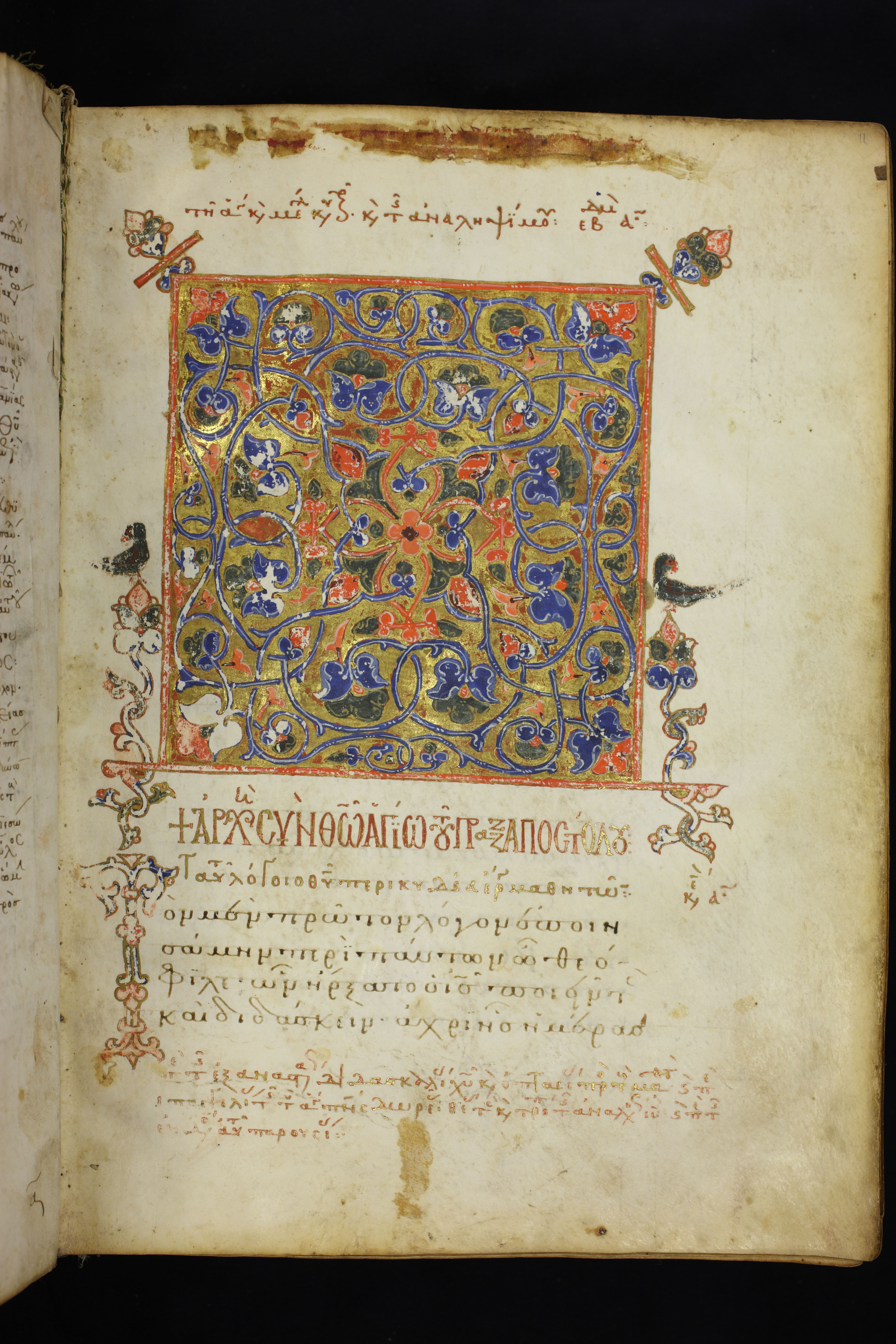
A 14th century copy of the Book of Acts in Minuscule 223

In Christianity, the Holy Spirit is seen as the third person of the Trinity (along with the Father God and the son, Jesus).

The Acts of the Apostles (or the Book of Acts, or simply Acts) is the fifth book of the Christian New Testament. Following immediately after Jesus’s crucifixion, the book tells of the founding of the Christian Church and the spread of its message beyond Israel.

The Holy Spirit plays a key role in the Acts of the Apostles, leading to the use of the titles Book of the Holy Spirit or the Acts of the Holy Spirit for that book.

The Book of Acts was written by Luke, who also wrote the Gospel of Luke. The book covers the history of the first 30 years of the Christian church. Of the about seventy occurrences of the word pneuma (πνεῦμα) in Acts, fifty-five refer to the Holy Spirit.

== Continuation of the ministry of Jesus ==
From the start of the book, in Acts 1:2, the reader is reminded that the Ministry of Jesus, while he was on Earth, was carried out through the power of the Holy Spirit and that the "acts of the apostles" are the continuing acts of Jesus, facilitated by the Holy Spirit. As such, Acts presents the Holy Spirit as the "life principle" of the early church and provides five separate and dramatic instances of its outpouring on believers: Acts 2:1-4, Acts 4:28-31, Acts 8:15-17, Acts 10:44 and Acts 19:6.

== Continuous work ==
References to the Holy Spirit appear throughout Acts 1, starting with the first paragraph, where Luke quotes Jesus as saying, "For John indeed baptized with water; but ye shall be baptized in the Holy Spirit… ye shall receive power, when the Holy Spirit is come upon you". This referred to the fulfillment of the prophecy of John the Baptist in Luke 3:16: "he shall baptize you in the Holy Spirit."

In addition to the Holy Spirit and in its impacts on the Book of Acts, this includes God’s direct communication to Paul the Apostle as told in the story of the Road to Damascus. This encounter had a very pivotal effect in terms of Paul's defense against the authorities of the Jewish clerics and the Roman Empire. Several passages, for example, Acts 9:1-9, Acts 18:10 and Acts 23:11 reveal a pneumatological element that shapes Paul's life bending towards following God's will.

The book ends with Paul in a Roman prison, preaching the news of Jesus and the Holy Spirit to his guards and visitors (Acts 27:23-31).
