= Community of goods of the early church of Jerusalem =

Sharing of property by early Christians

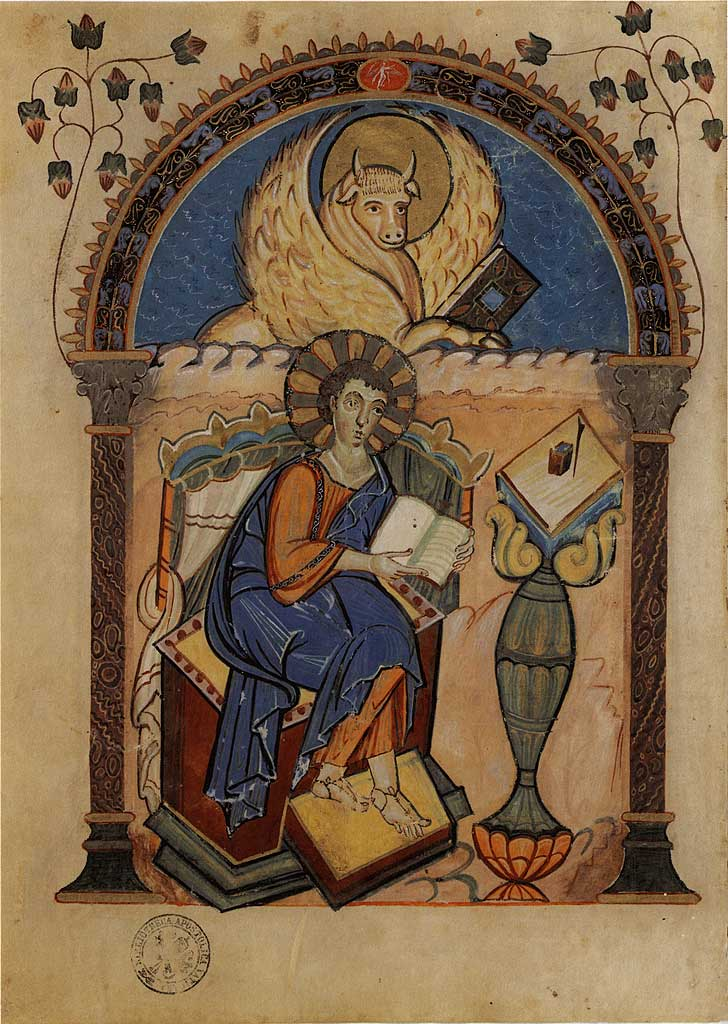
Saint Luke the evangelist

The community of goods of the early church of Jerusalem (also known as the early Christian community of goods) refers to the transfer of all property and sharing the proceeds with those in need, which Luke's Acts of the Apostles (Acts 2:44; 4:32) in the New Testament highlights as a characteristic of this first community of early Christianity in Jerusalem.

To emulate this New Testament account, various later Christian groups have attempted to share their property and administer it jointly, either in whole or in part.

== New Testament ==
=== Texts on community of property ===
The statement "They had all things in common" is found twice almost word for word in the text units Acts 2:42–47 and Acts 4:32–35. They are closely related summaries in terms of form, language and content. The evangelist Luke is regarded as their single author.

Immediately following the miracle of Pentecost and Simon Peter's first sermon, Acts 2:42-47 summarizes the main characteristics of the early church in Jerusalem:

"They held to the teaching of the apostles and to the fellowship, the breaking of bread and the prayers. They were all filled with fear, for many miracles and signs occurred through the apostles. And all who believed formed a community and had everything in common. They sold their possessions and goods and gave to everyone as much as they needed. Day after day they stayed in the temple united, broke bread in their homes and ate together in joy and simplicity of heart. They praised God and were loved by the people. And every day the Lord brought into their fellowship all those who were to be saved."

Luke only uses the word koinonia ("community") here. As the phrase hapanta koina ("all things in common") confirms, in the NT it means not only personal harmony, but also the social use of property. The distribution of proceeds from sales to the needy is therefore a constitutive part of this community and has the same status as apostolic teaching, the celebration of the meal (in which sacrament and satiety were still inseparable), prayer and mission. According to Acts 2:47, the early church received the sympathy of the Jewish people for this.

The text presents these characteristics as the effect of the Holy Spirit poured out in the Pentecost miracle and Peter's first sermon. This centrally proclaims the resurrection of Jesus Christ, the one who was previously crucified for the guilt of all (Acts 2:36). It ends with the call (Acts 2:38, 40): "Repent and be baptized every one of you in the name of Jesus Christ for the forgiveness of your sins, and you will receive the gift of the Holy Spirit. [...] Be saved from this perverse generation!" This is followed by a mass baptism of the sermon listeners. Their community of goods shows that they have received the promised Spirit and are responding to the call to repentance.

After further missionary successes, Acts 4:32-35 returns to the subject of the community of goods and explains its nature and purpose:

"And the multitude of believers had one heart and one soul; and no one said that any of his possessions was his own, but all things were common to them. [...] Nor did any of them suffer want, for those who owned land or houses sold them and brought the proceeds of what they had sold and laid them at the apostles' feet; and they distributed to each one according to his need."

Accordingly, private property remained formally in existence, but each baptized person renounced their property rights to the other members of the congregation as required. Luke describes the state of common ownership achieved in this way with the phrase hapanta koina, analogous to the Hellenistic ideal of friendship at the time, so that the early church was and should also be a role model for non-Jews. These summaries are followed by examples (Acts 4:36–37): " Joseph, who had been given the surname Barnabas by the apostles [...] owned a field and sold it, bringing the money and laying it at the apostles' feet." Acts 5:1–11 tells us that Ananias and Sapphira sold a piece of land together, but kept some of the proceeds for themselves and Ananias only brought part of it to the apostles. Peter asked him:

"'Ananias, why has Satan filled your heart to lie to the Holy Spirit and keep some of the proceeds of the property for yourself? Couldn't it have remained your property and couldn't you freely dispose of the proceeds even after the sale?"

With the decision in his heart, he had not lied to people, but to God: "When Ananias heard these words, he fell to the ground and died." The same happened to his wife, who then confronted Peter about what she had done.

The examples contrast the desired behavior of donating all the proceeds of a land sale to the church with the condemned behavior of keeping some of the proceeds for himself. According to Peter's reaction, the land sale and donation were voluntary, but withholding a portion was lying to God because the donor falsely pretended to donate the full proceeds. In doing so, he broke the fellowship brought about by the Holy Spirit, which was intended to benefit the needy. Accordingly, the actual proceeds of a voluntary donation should not be concealed or a previously announced donation handed over in full. After this, Acts no longer mentions the community of goods.

=== Texts on the equalization of property between communities ===
According to Acts 6:1–7, the community of goods did not always ensure that everyone was provided for: the widows of the Greek-speaking Jewish Christians had been overlooked in the daily distribution of food. This happened when the number of the disciples of the church was multiplied. A general assembly of the church transferred the distribution of food, which had previously been carried out by the apostles themselves, to a newly appointed group of seven deacons.

Other New Testament texts report on collections from other churches for the early church. They show that there was still a shortage there, so that an equalization of possessions was introduced between the churches. Acts 11:27–30 mentions such a collection from Antioch. According to Galatians 2:10, a continuous collection for the early church was agreed at the Apostles' Council (around 48), which Paul of Tarsus wanted to collect from the churches he had founded. A famine in the region around the year 47/48 was a conceivable reason for this. The example of the Jerusalem community of goods may have inspired the external collection of donations.

In Romans 15:25-29, Paul described the handing over of this collection "for the poor among the saints in Jerusalem" (cf. Acts 24:17) and wrote about the donors: "They have done it willingly and are also their debtors. For if the Gentiles have been given a share in their spiritual goods, it is right and proper that they should also serve them with physical goods." He therefore did not understand this collection for the poor as a charitable service, but as a theological duty of the Gentile Christians, who were to thank the Jewish Christians for the message of salvation they had received and confirm their lasting connection.

In 2 Cor 8:1-15, Paul encouraged the church in Corinth to continue the collection they had begun earlier for the early church: "For you know what Jesus Christ our Lord did in his love: He who was rich became poor for your sakes, that through his poverty he might make you rich. [...] For it is not a question of your being in need by helping others; it is a question of compensation. At the moment, your abundance should help compensate their poverty, so that one day their abundance may also help compensate your poverty. In this way there will be a balance, as it says in Scripture: "He who had gathered much did not have too much, and he who had little did not have too little." Paul thus took up the intention of the community of goods to compensate for the lack of the poor within the Christian community and transferred the idea of the equalization of possessions between rich and poor members of the church to the relationship between all the churches.

== Effects ==
In the history of Christianity, the community of goods of the early church (Acts 2/4) served as a model for Christian minorities who try to live accordingly and thus set themselves apart from the mainstream churches. It forms a critical benchmark for the entire relationship of the churches to poverty, property and possessions. It also provides a basis for social criticism, as it implies living together as equals in mutual, binding solidarity without exploitation and thus aims to testify to and anticipate the coming kingdom of God.

=== Late antiquity ===
The early church developed a hierarchy and the beginnings of a double-tier ethic, which issued the commandments of Jesus to most Christians. Church bishops were also large landowners. Sharing property with the poor was left to the individual as voluntary almsgiving. As a counter-movement to this, Christian monasticism emerged from 300 onwards, which is usually attributed to asceticism. Otto Gerhard Oexle, on the other hand, sees the idea of the Vita communis, inspired by the community of goods of the early church, as the reason for its emergence. The anchorites followed the example of Anthony, who gave away all his possessions in 305 and withdrew into the desert as a hermit. Pachomius founded the first Christian monastery as a koinobion around 325. For him, the early church was a defining motif, although he probably did not yet introduce a community of goods. Representatives of cenobitic monasticism always referred to Acts 2:44 and 4:32 to reject the ascetic model and to justify increasing communion as the correct form of living together for Christians that went hand in hand with Christianization. Eusebius of Vercelli (283–371) introduced a community of life and goods for the clergy of his city in 340 in accordance with Acts 2.

For many Church Fathers, the community of goods of the early church was the ideal of the apostolic age, from which they criticized luxury, venality, unjust profits, the taking of interest (as usury) and greed. In 368, during a severe famine in Cappadocia, the presbyter Basil the Great, who had previously lived without possessions for a long time as an anachoret, sharply criticized the rich, who were exploiting the lack of food to raise prices and shortage of goods, in sermons on Luke's texts from the New Testament. He demanded the immediate and unreserved use of their goods for the common good, the lowering of prices and interest rates on loans. He organized regular feeding of the poor from ongoing donations and, following this emergency aid, established a settlement for the poor that provided them with food and medical treatment on a permanent basis. His basic idea was that all private property belonged to God, so that every wealthy person was only his trustee and administrator and had to mobilize all surplus profits for the poor.

Gregory of Nazianzus and Gregory of Nyssa followed this principle called patronage. Jerome legitimized cenobitic monasticism around 380 by pointing out that Jewish Christians in Alexandria and elsewhere had practiced community of goods for centuries. John Cassian wrote about Acts 2:44: "The whole church lived like this at that time, whereas today there are only a few in the monasteries who lead this life." He thus idealized early Christianity in contrast to the church of his time.

Once Christianity had become the state religion (380), community of goods was only practiced in separate monasteries. The Rule of Augustine, written around 397, paraphrases Acts 2: "This is what we command you in the monastery. The first aim of your common life is to dwell together in unity and to be one heart and one soul in God. Therefore call nothing your own, but let everything belong to you together" (Ch. 1). For Augustine of Hippo, the community of goods of the early church was the norm and the historical starting point for Christians living together in household communities (vita communis) and thus for the cohesion of all Christians. Pope Leo XIV refers to Augustine's thoughts on the sharing of goods in his exhortation on love for the poor, published in 2025. Augustine emphasized this norm in 407 in his sermons against the Donatists, whom he accused of having a selfish attitude which was only interested in their own ethical perfection.

The Regula Benedicti (6th century) also demanded that aspiring monks give up all private property. The community of goods here also established a common economy and a duty to strictly regulated, daily common work. The administration of monastic common property was the sole responsibility of the respective abbot, was therefore bound to the hierarchy of the order and did not include any criticism of the church.

=== Middle Ages ===
The mendicant orders practiced lively almsgiving, persuaded many rich people to give up their property and at the same time welcomed the expanding interest economy. Their conflicts with the clergy influenced the universities and led to the formation of lay orders in many cities. In this way, they contributed significantly to the stabilization of medieval feudalism.

The Franciscan orders founded in the 11th century also practiced renunciation of property and community ownership. The Minorites in particular combined this more strongly than their predecessors with explicit criticism of unequal property and power relations in the church and society. However, attempts to encourage the clergy to adopt a non-possessive lifestyle and the Church to renounce wealth were rejected by the popes.

In the 13th century, the community of goods of the mendicant orders led to a scholastic dispute about the role of private property: Thomas Aquinas justified private property and its inheritance based on natural law as a form of Christian life on an equal footing with the community of goods. Johannes Duns Scotus, on the other hand, saw common property as normality, conceded only a right of use to goods as legitimate, denied the right to private property and interpreted it as an invention of the princes.

Forms of the community of goods that were critical of the church and society appeared more frequently from the 14th century onwards. Around 1370, the movement of the Brethren of the Common Life emerged in the Netherlands, but they did not want to form a new religious order. Instead, they saw their community of goods as a direct commandment of Jesus Christ, the only "abbot", for all regular canons. For them, the model of the early church as an apostolic teaching was a generally binding way of life for all Christians, both clerics and lay people, which the church had only covered up.

=== Reformation era ===
From the 15th century onwards, there were attempts to bring about a Radical Reformation in church and society, the representatives of which often called for a community of goods and implemented it locally or regionally at times: for example, the Czech Taborites (1420) and Hans Böhm (Drummer of Niklashausen) (1476).

From 1520, during the course of the Reformation, groups of Anabaptists made such attempts. They often sympathized with the German peasant uprisings and in some cases adopted their demands for the towns they reformed: for example, Nikolaus Storch, Thomas Müntzer and Hans Hergot in Saxony and Thuringia. In Zollikon (Switzerland), a circle around Conrad Grebel, Felix Manz and Wilhelm Reublin founded a local community of goods after their expulsion from Zurich in 1525. In addition to the Schleitheim Confession, the Anabaptists disseminated a community order in 1527, which was intended to establish a community of goods in future Anabaptist communities. This included the demand for a special budget from which the poor were to be provided for in acute emergencies. The peasant leader Michael Gaismair tried unsuccessfully to implement a new, Christian-based property system in Tyrol in 1526. Hans Hut, a disciple of Müntzer, tried unsuccessfully to implement the community of goods in Nikolsburg (Moravia) in 1527 against the moderate Anabaptist Balthasar Hubmaier. Hut understood community of goods as overcoming the original sin of greed in the sense of the ninth and tenth Commandments. His followers also practised it in their families and with refugees, whom they took into their homes. They founded a community of goods in 1528, first in Austerlitz, then in 1530 in Auspitz, and also advocated a radical pacifism that included renouncing armed self-defence.

As a result of the internal conflicts surrounding these issues, Jakob Hutter founded the first brotherhood settlements in Tyrol in 1533 as agrarian housing estates and craft businesses based on the division of labor with their own kindergartens and schools. Although Hutter had to flee to Moravia as early as 1535, while other attempts soon disappeared again, the Hutterites were able to preserve their communities to the present day. Between 1556 and 1578 in particular, new brother farms were established under Peter Walpot. During the severe persecution of the Counter-Reformation, they emigrated to Hungary, Wallachia and later to Ukraine. In the 19th century, brotherhoods emerged in the USA. Other examples are the Stäbler, Gabrieler and Philipper. These Anabaptist attempts were mostly intended as precursors to an expected reorganization of society as a whole, but did not seek to enforce this generally. Only the Anabaptist kingdom of Münster enforced community of goods and polygamy with a new constitution as a duty of all Münster Christians.

In 1525, Martin Luther accused the rebellious peasants of misusing the gospel for social change and thus confusing heavenly and earthly justice (two kingdoms doctrine). The grace of God granted in baptism was independent of social status. The community of goods of Acts 4:32ff. was voluntary and did not justify any demands on others. In contrast, the peasants wanted to keep their property and create common property with other people's property. In a polemic requested by the city council in 1528, the Augsburg pastor Urbanus Rhegius portrayed the theology of the Anabaptists and their way of life as an anti-divine seduction of the faithful. He interpreted their community of goods as a mere means of providing material security for idle vagabonds, as envy and disguised greed. He interpreted their aid to the poor as unregulated chaos with which they sought to evade civil order. The reformer Johannes Brenz, on the other hand, defended the persecuted Anabaptists in 1528/30: they had not attempted to impose a community of goods on all Christians, just as earlier monks had not; this could not be considered equivalent to sedition. Only actual sedition, not assumed future intentions, should be punished. By 1525, the peasant uprisings had been put down, and by 1534 most Anabaptist communes had been put down by massacring tens of thousands of their followers. Nevertheless, the Anabaptists clung to their faith and way of life, which for them was a life-threatening attack on the medieval Corpus Christianum.

=== Modern times ===
==== Seventeenth to nineteenth centuries ====
There were other communities of property among persecuted Christian minorities in the 17th century, such as the Levellers during the English Civil War (1642–1649). Their spokesman Gerrard Winstanley based his demand to dispossess all English nobles and replace the feudal order with common property directly on the entire Bible, without referring to continental theologians. From 1668, the Jesuit Jean de Labadie introduced household communities in several regions of Europe that shared income and property. His followers, the Labadists, emigrated to the US, bought land in Maryland and founded a rural commune there in 1683. It was run in an authoritarian manner by a "bishop" who assigned daily chores to everyone. All private property was forbidden and consumption was rationed. This community is said to have collapsed in 1725 due to the leader's self-enrichment.

Following a visionary experience she had in prison around 1758, the English Quaker Ann Lee founded a group called the Shakers because of their ecstatic dances. The initial eight members emigrated to the US in 1770 and founded a celibate, pacifist, spiritualist and missionary community near Albany (New York). The group took in orphans and homeless people, many of whom later became members. It grew to 18 communities with around 6000 members by 1826, but dwindled again to just a few people by 2000.

The Russian Doukhobors, probably founded by a Quaker around 1740, formed a tightly organized settlement, work and property community in Tauria with the permission of Tsar Alexander I from 1801. They punished apostates with death and were therefore banished to Transcaucasia in 1839. After several persecutions for their refusal to do military service, Tolstoy succeeded in having them allowed to emigrate to North America in 1886. In his late writings, Tolstoy described the future society he hoped for as an agrarian community of property that would abolish the state, the army, private property, trade and the industrial division of labour. Around 1900, he thus triggered the Tolstoyan movement, which was not founded by him and aimed for a pacifist anarchy.

In his work Pia desideria (1675), Pietist Philipp Jacob Spener referred to common property as the ideal of a Christian way of life according to Acts 2/4. Gottfried Arnold had developed this ideal in his "Unparteiische Kirchen- und Ketzer-Historie" (1699) as a critique of previous church history. Since then, social reformist pietists such as Ernst Christoph Hochmann von Hochenau and Friedrich Christoph Oetinger have regarded the original community of goods as a model. In his work "Die güldene Zeit" (1759), Oetinger identified the expected millennial kingdom of Jesus Christ with the pagan idea of the Golden Age: the 19th century would bring a democratic social order in which money, the state and private property would be abolished. His work inspired the founding of the Pietist settlement of Wilhelmsdorf (Württemberg) as a community of goods in 1824.

Johann Georg Rapp, a weaver from Württemberg influenced by Pietism, founded the Harmony Society in 1805 in Pennsylvania, USA, which existed from 1814 to 1824 under the name "New Harmony" in Indiana, then again in Pennsylvania until 1916 under the name "Economy". The members, originally around 800 and ultimately around 150, lived without marriage and transferred all property rights to a board chaired by Rapp. The commune split in 1832 due to leadership conflicts and gradually transformed itself into a pure production cooperative from 1840 onwards.

In the Church of Jesus Christ of Latter-day Saints (Mormons), Joseph Smith founded the United Order of Enoch in 1831, whose members lived in community of property. The order influenced the settlement of the Mormons in Missouri and Utah.

==== Twentieth century ====
Inspired by the religious socialists and the Hutterites, whom they initially joined, the couple Emmy and Eberhard Arnold founded the first "Bruderhof" in Sannerz (Hesse) in 1920. The Bruderhöfer cultivated a community of goods based on the Sermon on the Mount. During the National Socialist era, they were persecuted as pacifists and moved to alternative quarters in the Principality of Liechtenstein, Great Britain and Paraguay. Other Bruderhöfe were later established in the US and Australia.

Hans and Wally Klassen, Mennonites and Tolstoyans who had emigrated from Russia, belonged to the commune in Sannerz. In 1923, they founded a settlement in Sonnefeld (Upper Franconia), whose members – mostly Quakers – practised community of goods and strict vegetarianism and took in orphans.

In 1943, Chiara Lubich founded a community of women in Loreto (Marche) who vowed poverty, chastity and following Jesus in their daily lives. This gave rise to the Focolare Movement: an initially Catholic lay movement, which today has developed into an international and interreligious movement. Some of its members live unmarried in shared flats, pursuing ordinary professions but transferring all their salaries to a group fund. Surpluses are transferred to a central fund in Rome, from which essential goods are purchased and distributed to places where they are needed.

After 1945, a large number of Protestant and ecumenical communities emerged in Europe taking the original community of goods as a model and therefore seeing themselves as part of the church, not as special groups (sects) outside the church. Brother Roger, the founder and first prior of the Protestant Taizé Community, introduced a community of goods in 1949 that was linked to celibacy and strict obedience. The ecumenical Jesus Brotherhood, founded in 1961, also cultivates a way of life based on Acts 2 within the framework of the mainline churches.

== Research ==
Since the 19th century, NT research has been discussing its texts on the community of goods of the early church. Questions are asked about their meaning in their own context, contemporary analogies, biblical references, their possible form of organization, historicity, effectiveness and current significance.

=== Ancient analogies ===
A community of goods was a widespread social utopia in antiquity long before Christianity. Since the Histories of Herodotus (around 460 BC), some ancient historians have attributed a community of goods to past primitive peoples who did not yet know money as a means of exchange. Other authors described them as part of fictitious, prehistoric or submerged communities that had implemented ethical ideals. Such utopias projected into the past were common in Hellenism as a moral counter-image to the present.

Pythagoras in particular was often attributed an ideal philosophical society, which also practised a community of goods. In his dialog Timaeus (around 360 BC), Plato attributed the traditional saying "What belongs to friends is common" to Pythagoras.[53] Aristotle handed down the saying (Nicomachean Ethics 1159b): "The property of friends is common." This saying can also be found in the "Sayings of Sextus" (≈180–200), which an anonymous author compiled from older Hellenistic sources (primarily Platonism and Stoicism). Antonius Diogenes wrote about Pythagoras (around 200): "But he loved friends beyond measure, being the first to hold the view that among friends everything is common (ta ton filon koina) and the friend is an alter ego." Iamblichus of Chalcis wrote in his On Pythagorean Life (c. 300): "the origin of justice is community, equal right and a bond in which all feel the same entirely as a single body and a single soul and designate mine and yours alike [...]. Pythagoras did this best of all men by completely banishing the attachment to private property from the nature of his disciples and instead strengthening the sense of community."

Many researchers assume that Luke was familiar with the ancient idealization of the Pythagoreans and that it influenced his linguistic style (including koinonia, "one heart and one soul", hapanta koina: "they had everything in common"). Martin Hengel (1996), Gerd Theissen (2008) and other New Testament scholars assume that Luke took the phrase hapanta koina literally from Hellenistic proverbial wisdom circulating at the time. According to Matthias Konradt (2006), he took the phrase from the Hellenistic friendship ethic. According to Niclas Forster (2007), he deliberately stylized the summaries in Acts 2/4 following the common literary pattern of ideal communities at the time.

The community of goods was part of some variants of the ancient utopia of the Golden Age. Roman authors such as the poet Virgil considered this age had begun with Emperor Augustus (Aeneid, 29–19 BC). However, they left out the traditional characteristic of the community of goods, apparently because the reality contradicted it too clearly. In contrast, Acts 2/4 emphasizes the community of goods of the early church: possibly in deliberate contrast to the Roman environment, just as the Lucan birth story describes Jesus with imperial titles as the (true) "Saviour" and bringer of "peace on earth". Such "anti-imperial allusions" are considered a fundamental feature of Luke's double work.

The community of goods was also known in ancient Judaism. Some Dead Sea Scrolls, the Community Rule and the Damascus Scroll (written around 180 BC), describe an end-time community of "priests" who were to give up their possessions in accordance with Ez 44:28 (priests were to be propertyless to live entirely for God) upon joining this group. These texts contain further parallels to Acts 2/4, such as water baptism as a condition of admission, a governing body of twelve lay people and three priests. In contrast to Acts 2/4, they emphasize living together in common houses, the formation of a fixed community wealth by paying wages into a common fund and a firmly organized welfare system. Whether the group described existed and lived in the nearby historical settlement of Qumran is disputed.

In the 1st century, Jewish authors influenced by Hellenism portrayed the supposed Essenes as analogous to the Pythagoreans. Flavius Josephus wrote:

"They despise wealth, and their sense of community is admirable; it is the law that those who join the sect hand over their property to the order, so that on the whole neither poverty nor wealth prevails among them, but after pooling the property of the individuals there is only one property for all as brothers ... The administrators of the common property are elected, and each individual is indiscriminately obliged to serve all."

Philo of Alexandria wrote:

"They show their love for people through benevolence, equality... and community life (koinonia) [...]: First, then, no house is the property of a single person without being, in fact, the house of all; for, besides living together in brotherhoods..., their dwelling is also open to members of the same sect who come from elsewhere. [...] Consequently, they have a common treasury for all and common expenses. The clothes are common and the food is common; they have also adopted the custom of communal meals.... Sharing the same roof, the same way of life and the same table is nowhere better realized. And this is the reason for it: everything they earn as wages for their daily work they do not keep for themselves, but lay it down before all... so that it may be at the common disposal of those who wish to help themselves to it."

These idealized descriptions are considered literary cultural criticism. Although no direct influence on Acts 2/4 can be proven, it is assumed that Luke became acquainted with the community of goods through the Hellenized Judaism of the time. According to Martin Honecker, however, Acts 2/4 does not contain a general protest against wealth and private property.

=== Biblical references ===
The land law of the Torah is based on the principle (Lev 25:23): YHWH alone owned the land of Israel, the Israelites had only "leased" it. This establishes the commandment of the jubilee, which demands that Israelites who have fallen into slavery be released every 50th year and that everyone be given back their original God-given inheritance. Because this commandment was disregarded during Israel's reign (approx. 950–586 BC), it was included in the future promise of exilic-post-exilic biblical prophecy (Is 61:1–2). According to Luke 4:18–21, Jesus of Nazareth quoted this promise during his public appearance in the synagogue of Nazareth and claimed to fulfill it. At that time, however, the Romans and Jewish landowners dependent on them owned the land of Israel. Therefore, the community of goods of the early church is interpreted as an attempt to anticipate and partially fulfill the promised year of jubilee under foreign rule.

Many interpreters understand the expression "one heart and one soul" (Acts 4:32) as an allusion to the Jewish Shema Yisrael (Deut 6:5): "Therefore you shall love the Lord your God with all your heart, with all your soul and with all your strength." Gerhard Jankowski (1995) concluded that, for Luke, the early church realized the first of the Ten Commandments described here precisely through their community of goods. For by no one calling anything their own, but all disposing of everything together, they had once again recognized God as the sole owner of Israel (Lev 25:23). This is why Luke reports on the sale of land and highlights the example of a Levite: according to Deut 18:1–2, this tribe of priests was not allowed to own land anyway. Apparently, the early church, like the Levites, had given up all land ownership. Luke thus presented the early church as an alternative to the Roman Empire, which was based on large estates, slavery and military power. This counter-design could therefore only be realized in a completely different social order, which Acts had also worked towards in Rome with the preaching of Jesus' resurrection.

For many New Testament scholars, Acts 4:34 ("Neither was there any among them that suffered need...") clearly alludes to the Torah commandment Deut 15:4: "But in fact there should be no poor among you at all ..." For Luke, the community of goods of the early church therefore fulfilled the goal of the commanded sabbatical year (Deut 15), which provided for general debt relief for the poor. But while this goal remained unattainable for Deut 15:11 ("The poor will never completely disappear from your land..."), Luke deliberately did not take up this verse, to which Jesus also referred (Mk 14:7): "In the church, then, the promise given to Israel is fulfilled, Deut 15:4." Michael Schäfers (1998) also concluded: By remedying the lack of the needy according to Acts 4:34, the early church had, for Luke, fulfilled the utopia of the Torah that there should no longer be any poor among the people of God. Their community of goods therefore aimed to permanently overcome poverty in the sense of Deut 15:4. It went beyond mere individual generosity, which could never eliminate poverty. The early church could only have been a model for the diaspora Judaism of the time, as attested to by ancient sources, if it had actually practised a community of goods.

The community of goods of the early church is usually explained as an influence of Jesus. In 1988, Jürgen Roloff cited the following direct influences of Jesus: his renunciation of possessions (Lk 6:24), his corresponding demand to his followers (Lk 9:3; 10:4), his criticism of wealth (Mk 10:21–27; Lk 12:16–21; 16:13.19-31) and his warning against worry (Mt 6:25–33). The early church followed Jesus' proclamation. With their community of goods, they tried to heed his warning against Mammon as a power hostile to God and used possessions for the common good, for the poor, not for their own interests that separated them from others. Peter Stuhlmacher (2005) assumed that Jesus' commandments and the Decalogue continued to apply in the early church. He interpreted Acts 2/4 as an attempt by the early church to obey Jesus' commandment to give up possessions (Lk 12:22–32; Mt 6:25–34). This is why they formed a community completely focused on the reign of God.

=== Organization ===
The historical-critical debate on the subject began in the 19th century in the context of the social conflicts of the time. From around 1830, the community of goods of the early church was used to justify the goals of utopian socialism and interpreted as the impetus for a comprehensive social reform or social revolution. This was the case, for example, of Félicité de La Mennais and Wilhelm Weitling.

In 1843, Friedrich Engels rejected the equation "Christianity is communism", which was popular in France at the time: Although "a few passages in the Bible seemed to favor communism", the "general spirit" of biblical teachings completely contradicted this and every other "reasonable measure". He conceded, however, that the rebels in the German Peasants' War had rightly invoked the original Christian community of goods: Their oppression and lawlessness "stood out very much from the commonwealth of the first Christians and from the teachings of Christ as laid down in the Bible". The peasant leader Thomas Müntzer had therefore only drawn "logical conclusions" from Luther's teachings when he concluded that the "community of property" and democracy were the only correct form of society for Christians from the Bible.

Since the March Revolution of 1848, Christian interpreters have drawn a line between the community of goods of the early church and early socialism: Acts 2:44/4:32 does not mean the abolition of private property through another, collective form of ownership. The deacon Heinrich Merz emphasized in 1849: Private property was a right and a duty to be able to help those in need. Forced expropriation would only make the rich poor and thus the poor even poorer. Everyone only paid what they could and needed into the community treasury, but kept the rest: in the knowledge that "everything belongs to God and everything is for the brothers". It therefore depends on the inner willingness to love. Gerhard Uhlhorn (1895) emphasized something similar: Acts 2/4 was about voluntary, spontaneous, unregulated almsgiving out of the enthusiastic love of the early days.

The Catholic priest Wilhelm Hohoff had been proclaiming since 1871 that the equality of goods, i.e. a social equalization of property, was the goal of Christianity on account of neighbourly love. This was therefore compatible with socialism. This made him an early representative of religious socialism. In contrast, following the encyclical Rerum novarum (1891), most Catholic interpreters did not infer social reform from the New Testament, but rather the general social necessity of property. They interpreted the community of goods as a heightened form of almsgiving or as a special ethic for an ethically perfect minority. Theo Sommerlad (1903) interpreted Acts 2:44 as an "institution of support for the poor" without a fixed form of organization. The NT texts show no trace of an association or common management of the land.

The Marxist Karl Kautsky categorized primitive Christianity from 1895 onwards as a reform movement supported by an ancient "lumpenproletariat", the destitute poor, small craftsmen and middle-class merchants. This movement reacted to the mass poverty of the time with the fair distribution of goods and joint administration of goods. However, the early Christians had sold the means of production or left them in private hands and were therefore unable to overcome poverty. Because they limited themselves to a "communism of enjoyment" and a common household, they would have had to give up their egalitarian ideal based on the family as Christianity spread. Christians could therefore participate in the construction of a classless society, although their faith was incompatible with scientific socialism.

Some Marxists criticized Kautzky's theses, others took them up positively. Rosa Luxemburg, for example, wrote in 1905 that, in line with the impoverishment of the population at the time, the early Christians had proclaimed common property, sharing of the rich with the poor, social equality and thus communism, but limited to food and the property of the baptized, not the means of production. The permanent overcoming of class rule corresponds to the message of Jesus Christ. The anti-communism of today's priests is therefore directed against his teaching. The first apostles in particular were "the most passionate communists". She quoted Acts 4:32–35.

Most theologians and church representatives subsequently rejected this view. Ernst Troeltsch contradicted Kautsky from 1908 onwards: The early Christians did not have any social reform goals and did not represent any particular class interests. They only tried to implement Jesus' commandment of love within their own circle, albeit initially quite radically. Their community of goods only included the distribution of goods for consumption, not the means of production. It was a "communism of love" based on the internal solidarity of the believers as a communism of consumption. The church historian Hans von Schubert (1919) considered the category of communism of love to be inappropriate: the early church had not exercised any compulsion to jointly manage goods of consumption. Leonhard Ragaz, on the other hand, followed on from Troeltsch: The early church had formed a free cooperative and strived for a "socialism of voluntariness" that corresponded to the spirit of Christ. In 1972, Ernst Bloch also affirmed the term communism of love for the early church's community of goods. Heinz-Dietrich Wendland, Wilhelm Schneemelcher, Wolfgang Schrage, Jürgen Roloff and others, on the other hand, emphasized that "communism" was incompatible with "love" and not a suitable category for the original Christian community of goods. It was neither about complete dispossession nor the socialization of the means of production.

According to Michael Schäfers (1998), the early church practiced a mixture of individual renunciation of property and social welfare in line with its possibilities and the circumstances of the time, with the aim of overcoming poverty internally and creating equal property relations. It therefore subordinated private property to this goal and made it subservient, but did not replace it with a collective form of ownership or a collectively exercised right of disposal. The process of voluntary surrender of property had sought to equalize ownership, and private rights of ownership and disposal had taken a back seat. This procedural equalization of possession was understood and legitimized as an expression of following Jesus as a sign of the expectation of the near future.

Peter Stuhlmacher (2005) concluded from the differences between Acts 2 and ancient texts that describe firmly organized communities of goods and provision: "In Jerusalem it was only a matter of a vita communis on the basis of spiritual spontaneity and voluntariness... the whole focus of life was on prayer and the imminent coming of the Lord implored in the maranatha".

According to Jürgen Roloff (2010), the community of goods in both narratives reacts to the resurrection testimony of the apostles and proves its effectiveness (Acts 2:34; 4:33). Luke thus inextricably linked both aspects. Acts 2 presents the community of goods as a summary, Acts 4 describes its concrete implementation: "Whenever the situation requires it, the owners of land and houses sell their property and deliver the proceeds to the apostles. They administer the common treasury, from which needy members of the congregation receive what they need (cf. 6:1f.)" In this way, Luke elevated a temporary practice, which he was probably only aware of from the individual examples that have been handed down, to a historical model for the church of all times. Because the apostles, as witnesses to the manifestations of the Resurrected Christ, expected his imminent return, they spontaneously used available resources for the needy, but did not organize any long-term provision.

=== Historicity ===
Hans Conzelmann (1969) argued against the historicity of the community of goods in terms of literary criticism: the summaries depicted a general renunciation of property (Acts 2,44/4,32), whereas the exemplary narratives described the renunciation as a special achievement of individuals (Acts 4,36f.), i.e. as an exception. Ancient texts on the community of goods of the Pythagoreans were also ideal images. The transfer of property and wages when joining the community of Qumran (which Conzelmann assumed to be historical) shows that a community of goods could only have existed if production had also been organized jointly. Therefore, Acts 2/4 is a retrospectively idealized depiction; there was "no such thing" as a complete community of property.

Gerd Theissen (1989), on the other hand, assumed a historical core of the community of goods. The early church probably adopted the Hellenistic slogan "All things are common to all" as a reaction to the conflict between Hebrews and Hellenists (Acts 6:1ff.) to oblige the conflicting parties to share equally and to prevent an authoritarian development.

Ulrich Luz (2005) argued in favor of historicity as follows: Luke deliberately formulated the summaries in such a way that they echoed motifs of ideal social forms and friendship ethics in ancient philosophy as well as biblical Torah commandments. But he certainly did not invent the community of goods, as there is reliable evidence of regular communal meals in the early church, which are reminiscent of Jesus' last meal before his death. Such religious meals had always included the provision of social security for the poor. As Palestine was constantly threatened by famine at the time, many former followers of Jesus came from Galilee. They were unable to pursue their professions as fishermen and farmers in the city. The early church as the center of early Christianity was often visited by other Christians and a local group of Essenes in Jerusalem also practiced community of goods, so it is highly likely that some communitarian form of life of the early church was historical.

Jürgen Roloff (2010) cited similar and additional arguments: many of the first members from Galilee had given up their families, homes and professions there and could hardly find work as fishermen and farmers in Jerusalem. In this situation, local Christians had to help support them. Pharisees had established a welfare program for the poor by offering and collecting donations for the needy at the meal celebration in the synagogues. The early Christians in Jerusalem followed this example.

=== Effectiveness ===
The community of goods has often been portrayed as the cause of the impoverishment of the early church: Selling property and consuming the proceeds had led to economic ruin. This is why the early church was later dependent on material help from outside, as Paul's collection shows. The community of goods therefore inevitably failed and was not a model for the present day. This view was held by Georg Wilhelm Friedrich Hegel, Adolf Stoecker (1881), Friedrich Lahusen (1890), Hans von Schubert (1919), Max Weber, Gotthilf Schenkel (1946), Werner Elert (1949), Martin Robbe (1967), Rudolf Bultmann (1968), Heinz Kreissig (1970), Barry Gordon (1989) and others.

Walter Rauschenbusch, representative of the Social Gospel (1907), Leonhard Ragaz (around 1920), Harmannus Obendink (1949) and Hans Joachim Iwand (1964) disagreed. Iwand emphasized that the community of goods was just as possible or impossible from a human perspective as God's incarnation. Anyone who believed in Jesus Christ could not reject the community of goods.

Wolfgang Reinhardt (1995) emphasized that Luke deliberately did not harmonize contradictions regarding the initial community of goods. The impoverishment of the early church had external, not internal causes. One should not speak of the failure of the community of goods because Acts 11:27–30 already shows its effect on other churches: "Rather, one could speak of an extension of the model to the entire ecumenical community." He quoted Klaus Haacker in agreement: "The example of the early church has in fact set a precedent and has been implemented in supra-regional actions to balance burdens within the church." The attractive provision for the poor was the main reason for the growth of early Christianity in antiquity.

According to Martin Leutzsch (1999), early Christian texts (Didache, Apology of Justin, Lucian) confirm the effectiveness of the community of property. Non-Christian ancient parallels also show its viability. For Luke, according to Acts, it was a success story, not a failed experiment.

=== Validity claim ===
In 1780, the Lübeck surgeon Jakob Leonhard Vogel interpreted Acts 2/4 as a valid legal claim of poor Christians against rich Christians and a common right of disposal for all Christians:

"Every Christian had a right to the goods of all the members of the whole community according to the fraternal union and in case of need could demand that the wealthy members share as much of their property with him as was required for his needs. Every Christian could make use of the goods of his brothers, and Christians who had something could not deny their needy brothers the benefit and use of the same. A Christian, for example, who had no house, could ask another Christian who had two or three houses to give him a dwelling, but he remained master of the houses. However, because of the community of use, one house had to be given to the other to live in."

Martin Leutzsch sees most traditional interpretations as attempts to reject the claim to validity of the Lucan model for today's Christians. He includes the following lines of argument:

- Consistent historicization: the community of goods only existed in the special, unrepeatable situation of the early Christians (their near expectation).
- Consistent de-historicization: It was never a historical reality, only an ideal construct of Luke.
- Denial of the model character: Community of goods was only mentioned in Acts, the Jerusalem model was only one among others in early Christianity.
- Religious-historical comparison: The community of goods is taken from non-Christian parallels and is not derived from Jesus' message.
- Limitation of relevance and effectiveness: The community of goods is a model for the church, not a model for society. According to Acts itself, it was not practised by all early Christians, but only under the leadership of the first-called apostles. Those involved had fallen into a Pentecostal frenzy. It led to the impoverishment of the early church.

== Bibliography ==
- Arnold, Eberhard (1921). Siegmund-Schultze, Friedrich (ed.). Sie hatten alles gemein. Die soziale Botschaft des Christentums für unsre Zeit dargestellt in Ansprachen von Männern und Frauen verschiedener Richtungen und Parteien (2nd ed.). pp. 22–26.
- Goertz, Hans-Jürgen, ed. (1984). Alles gehört allen. Das Experiment Gütergemeinschaft vom 16. Jahrhundert bis heute (in German). Munich: Beck. ISBN 3406092896.
- Horn, Friedrich W. (1998). "Die Gütergemeinschaft der Urgemeinde". Evangelische Theologie. 58 (5): 370–383. doi:10.14315/evth-1998-0505.
- Klauck, Hans-Josef (1989). "Gütergemeinschaft in der klassischen Antike, in Qumran und im Neuen Testament". Gemeinde – Amt – Sakrament. Neutestamentliche Perspektiven (in German). Würzburg: Echter. pp. 69–100. ISBN 3429011825.
- Leutzsch, Martin (1994). Faber, Richard (ed.). Erinnerung an die Gütergemeinschaft. Über Sozialismus und Bibel. Sozialismus in Geschichte und Gegenwart (in German). Würzburg: Königshausen & Neumann. ISBN 388479731X.
- Miranda, José Porfirio (1988). Comunismo en la biblia (in Spanish). México: Siglo XXI editores. ISBN 9682314860.
- Plümper, Hans-Dieter (1972). Die Gütergemeinschaft bei den Täufern des 16. Jahrhunderts (in German). Göppingen: Alfred Kümmerle.
- Schempp, Hermann (1969). Gemeinschaftssiedlungen auf religiöser und weltanschaulicher Grundlage (in German). Tübingen: Mohr/Siebeck. ISBN 3165292728.
- Wacht, Manfred (1984). Klauser, Theodor (ed.). Gütergemeinschaft. Reallexikon für Antike und Christentum (in German). Vol. 13. Stuttgart: Anton Hiersemann.
