= Aeneas (biblical figure) =

Biblical character in the New Testament (Acts 9)

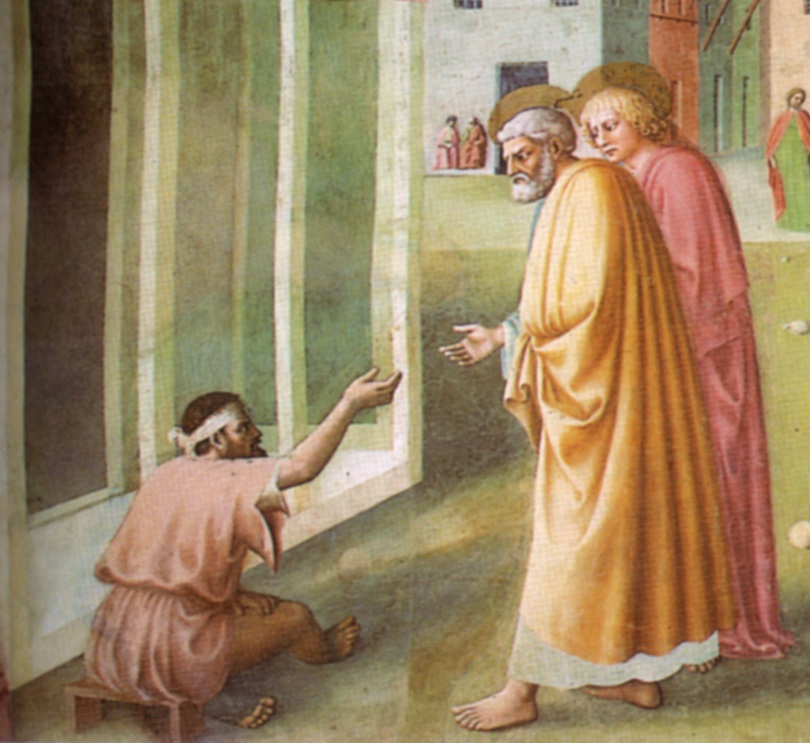
Section of Healing of the Cripple and Raising of Tabitha by Masolino da Panicale, 1425.

Aeneas (Greek: Αἰνέας, romanized: Aineas) is a character in the New Testament. According to Acts 9:32-33, he lived in Lydda, and had been a cripple for eight years. When Peter said to him, "Jesus Christ heals you. Get up and roll up your mat," he was healed and got up.

F. F. Bruce suggests that Aeneas was "one of the local Christian group, though this is not expressly stated." According to David J. Williams, there is some ambiguity in the Greek text of verse 34, which contains the phrase στρῶσον σεαυτῷ (strōson seautō) normally translated as "make thy bed". The text would literally be rendered as Peter telling Aeneas to "spread for himself", which might not refer to his bedding, but something else he had been unable to do. Williams suggests it could, for example, mean "Get yourself something to eat".

The account of Aeneas being healed is followed by an account of the raising of Dorcas.

== See also ==
- Acts 9
