= Early Church of Jerusalem =

First community of early Christianity

The Early Church of Jerusalem is considered to be the first community of early Christianity. It was formed in Jerusalem after the crucifixion of Jesus. It proclaimed to Jews and non-Jews the resurrection of Jesus Christ, the forgiveness of sins and Jesus' commandments to prepare for his return (parousia) and the associated end of the world.

== Sources ==
There is little concrete evidence for the beginnings of the early Church of Jerusalem. Sources include the statements in Paul's letter to the Galatians, inferences from the synoptic gospels and, above all, statements from Luke's Acts of the Apostles. These writings were written between 62 and around 100 AD. We can go further back in time with doctrinal traditions quoted by Paul of Tarsus in his letters. The oldest Passion account integrated into the Gospel of Mark (Mk 14–15) was probably also written by early Christians in Jerusalem.

== Chronology ==
The chronological key dates provide an overview of the first events and evolution of the early church.

AD	Events	Sources
30	Death of Jesus	Mk 15
~ 30–32	Constitution of the church of Jerusalem /first conflicts	Acts 1–5
As from 30	Activity of the Jesus movement in Galilee; initially oral transmission of the Jesus tradition.	Mk 16; Mt 28; Jn 21
31–43	Peter leads the church of Jerusalem	Acts 1–5
31/32	Formation of a church in Damascus	Acts 9
~ 32	Hebrews and Hellenists in Jerusalem	Acts 6
32/33	Stephen	Acts 7
32/33	Paul's calling	Acts 9; 22; 26
As from 33	Philip's mission	Acts 8
~ 33–34	Paul Arabia	Gal 1,17–18
~ 34	Foundation of the church in Antioch	Acts 11,19ff
35	1st Paul's visit to Jerusalem	Gal 1,18
~ 35	Barnabas is active in Antioch	Acts 11,22–26
~ 35–40	Oral/written record of the Passion narrative, first specific collections of Jesus traditions.	-
~ 36–42	Paul in Syria and Cilicia (Tarsus)	Acts 9,28–30
~ 40	Founding of the church in Rome, 'Christians' as a separate group in Antioch	Acts11,26
~ 40–50	Emergence of pre-Pauline traditions	-
~ 42	Paul joins Antioch	Acts 11,25–26
43/44	Persecution under Agrippa I, Peter leaves Jerusalem and James becomes leader of the church	Acts 12,1–4.17
~ 45–47	1st missionary journey	Acts 13–14
48	Apostles' Convention (spring); Antiochian incident (summer/autumn)	Acts 15,1–34; Gal 2,1–10.11–14
49	Edict of Claudius	Acts 18,2
48–51/52	2nd missionary journey	Acts 15–18
50/51	Paul in Corinth	Acts 18,1–17
51/52	Gallio in Corinth	Acts 18,12–17
52–55/56	3rd missionary journey	Acts 18–21
52–54/55	Paul in Ephesus	Acts 19
55	Paul's journey to Macedonia	Acts 20:1-2; 2Cor 2:13
56	(Beginning of the year:) Paul's last stay in Corinth	(Acts 20,2–3)
56	(Early summer:) Paul's arrival in Jerusalem	Acts 21
56–58	Paul's imprisonment in Caesarea	Acts 23–24
58	Change of office Felix/Festus	Acts 24,27
59	Paul's arrival in Rome	Acts 28,11ff
64	Death of Peter and Paul	-

== Origins ==
Jesus' followers from Galilee, who had followed him to Jerusalem, probably dispersed after his arrest (Mk 14:50). Most of the disciples returned to their home villages after his burial at the latest, as his execution on the cross also seemed to have refuted his preaching of the imminent kingdom of God (Lk 24:21).

After they had come to believe in the resurrection of Jesus in Galilee, a group of disciples led by Peter returned to Jerusalem, which happened without attracting attention due to the constant arrival of pilgrims in the city. Small house churches without a comprehensive organization probably emerged at around the same time, scattered all over Palestine. They proclaimed Jesus as the Messiah of Israel and all nations. What motivated the followers of Jesus to do this is historically obscure, but is connected to their resurrection experiences.

According to Luke's account in Acts 2, the early church came into being through a miracle, the outpouring of the Holy Spirit on Pentecost. For the early Christians, this fulfilled the promise of the Spirit that the Jewish prophet Joel 3 had promised for the end times. For with Jesus' resurrection, the end times promised by Israel's prophets began for them. They therefore proclaimed the miracle of Pentecost as an anticipation of the coming of the kingdom of God, which overcomes all language barriers and allows all nationalities to join in the praise of God due to the forgiveness of sins obtained through Jesus (Dan 7:14). Accordingly, the author of Acts understood the early church as an eschatological community of salvation, in which the understanding between nations is already a reality and points to the promised peace between nations (Isa 2:2ff and Mic 4:1-5).

== Members and organization ==
The early church essentially consisted of "disciples" - men and women - whom Jesus of Nazareth had already called to be his followers in Galilee and who had accompanied him on his way to Jerusalem. After the disciples proclaimed Jesus' resurrection, they were initially joined by Jews from very different backgrounds, many of them probably "devout" with a strong expectation of the end times. They were also joined by Pharisees, who brought with them their intensive study of the Hebrew Bible and their focus on God in everyday life. Zealots, who joined the early church, conveyed their commitment to the poor and disadvantaged. When (Acts 6:7) mentions that Jewish priests also "became obedient to the faith", they may have been Essenes living in Jerusalem. Ludger Schenke believes that parallels in self-image and practice between Qumran and the early church can be traced back to converted Essenes.

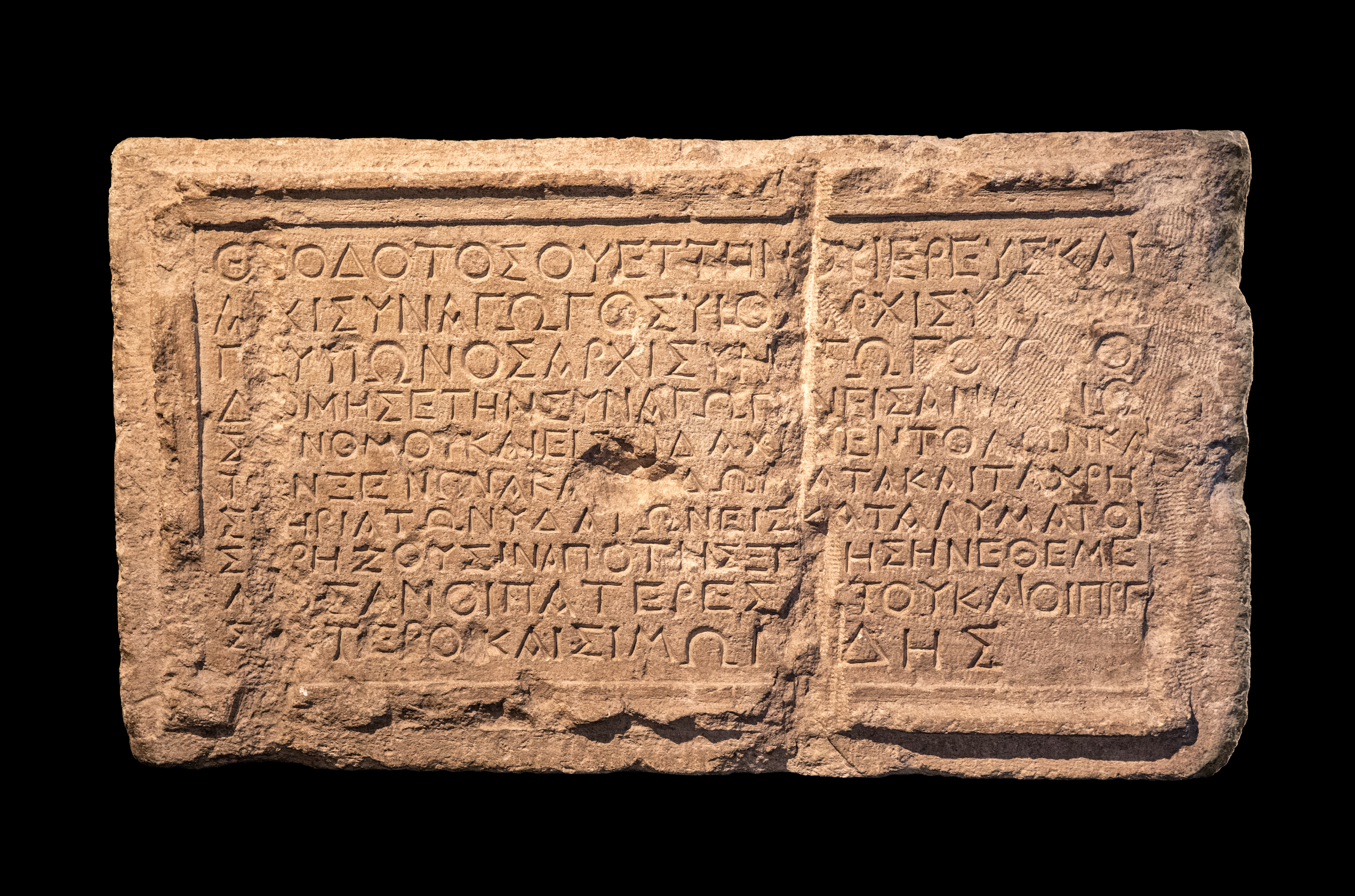
Theodotos inscription, donor inscription of a Jerusalem synagogue of the 1st century AD (Israel Museum).

There were also many Greek-speaking Jews living in Jerusalem who had come from the Diaspora and for whom a more conservative orientation and a very positive attitude toward the temple can be assumed. If some were disappointed with the temple cult as they experienced it there, they may have joined the early church and introduced the temple criticism that later characterized the Jerusalem "Hellenists".

Twelve of the male followers called by Jesus are highlighted by name in the Gospels as the first called and a reflection of the Twelve Tribes of Israel. Judas Iscariot, who belonged to this circle, is said to have taken his own life after betraying Jesus to the high council; according to Acts 1:21f, Matthias took his place. Schenke assumes that the Twelve (under Peter's leadership) led the Jerusalem church as a college. However, this college only existed for a short time, as Paul did not meet it again when he visited Jerusalem. The restoration of the Twelve Tribes of Israel had programmatic significance in Jerusalem in particular. The early dogmatization of the Twelve in all the Gospels also shows that the early church saw itself as the end-time forerunner of the entire people of God, chosen by the Messiah Jesus Christ, who was glorified by God. Their mission to Israel therefore had priority for them.

According to the New Testament, Jesus showed himself to his disciples as the Risen One and called them to mission: this established their authority as apostles. As Simon Peter experienced the first appearance of the Risen Lord, he was confirmed in his leadership position, which he had already held in the circle of disciples during Jesus' lifetime. Schenke refers to the tradition passage Lk 22:31-32 and assumes that the group of disciples was in a serious crisis (apparently after Jesus' death on the cross), and Peter called the discouraged together and strengthened them. Anyone who had an apparition of the Risen One after Jesus' death and had been commissioned by him for mission was considered an apostle. This circle went beyond the Twelve: only Luke identified it with the leaders and founders of the early church. It is uncertain until when the circle of twelve was in charge. In his letter to the Galatians (written 50–57), Paul only mentions the "three pillars": James, Simon Peter and John (Gal 2:9).

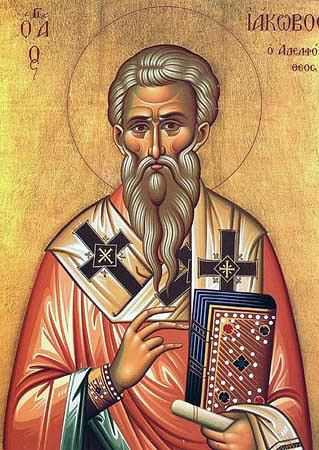
Icon representation of St. James

According to the list of witnesses of the early church (1 Cor 15:3-8 ), James, a brother of Jesus, had received his own vision of the risen Christ. He had not been a follower of Jesus during his lifetime, but became the leader of the early church after Easter. He represented the group of "Judaizers", who demanded that all newly baptized Gentile Christians observe important Torah commandments, possibly also circumcision, i.e. conversion to Judaism. This is why Paul named him over Peter, who usually comes first in all lists of apostles, as the main partner in his negotiations on the Gentile mission. His companion Barnabas, a Levite from Cyprus, played an important role in this. Due to his diaspora background, he was able to mediate between Greek-speaking and Aramaic-speaking early Christians.

The Acts of the Apostles reports the election of seven deacons to care for the poor (Acts 6). Schenke assumes that these were charismatic missionaries who addressed the Greek-speaking Jews in Jerusalem. As the Greek speaking part of the early church of Jerusalem became organizationally independent, they became its governing body; however, the Twelve continued to lead the church as a whole, so that according to Schenke there was no competition. The Jewish priests who had joined the early church continued to perform their duties at the temple, and Jewish scribes who joined the early church worked there as teachers (rabbis). The early church had no need for its own ministerial structure because it was convinced that the end of the world was imminent. For this reason, no successors were envisaged for the seven or the twelve.

Prophets were probably also an essential element of the early church, and like their colleagues in Corinth, they received direct revelations from God, spoke in "tongues" and had various "charisms" (gifts of grace) to share (1 Cor 12:12ff).

The number of members can only be estimated. According to Acts 1:13-15, there were initially only around 120 "brothers", whereas Acts 2:41 already mentions 3,000 first baptized after Peter's first sermon, 4:4 soon after 5,000: however, these figures appear to be far inflated in view of the meetings in the Jerusalem temple tolerated by the Sanhedrin. The Roman authorities would not have simply allowed a large messianic group in Jerusalem.

== Theology and worship ==
The ideal image of the early church is primarily determined by the description in Acts 2:37-47: The early Christian missionary preaching, which is entirely focused on the proclamation of Jesus' resurrection and his exaltation as "Kyrios", is followed here by the conversion and baptism of new disciples. This meant forgiveness of sin and thus acceptance into the end-time community of salvation. This meant salvation from the expected final judgment and reception of the Holy Spirit, who enabled them to keep Jesus' commandments and spread his "teaching".

According to Luke (Acts 2, 42–26), the following criteria united the early Christians into a community:

- They adhered to the teaching of the apostles, i.e. the belief in the resurrection of Jesus proclaimed to them.
- ... and fellowship: the early Christians met together regularly.
- ... and the breaking of bread: They celebrated the breaking of bread as a continuation of Jesus' meal fellowship and/or in remembrance of the last meal of their Lord.
- ... and the prayers: This probably included the Lord's Prayer taught by Jesus himself.
- ... and many miracles and signs also took place through the apostles: they continued the healing mission they had received as followers of Jesus (Mt 10) within the early church by caring for the sick.
- And all who believed were in the same place and had everything in common. Luke emphasized the community of goods as an essential characteristic of the early church, which, as a result of the outpouring of the Spirit, also established the holiness of the church as "Ecclesia" (called out ones).
- They sold their possessions and goods and distributed them to everyone, each as much as they needed: providing for the needy Christians from the community property was a task of the "deacons" who were later elected.
- Day after day, they remained in the temple with one accord ...: The Jerusalem central sanctuary also remained the Christians' place of assembly, so that they initially observed its cultic customs and were accepted as part of Judaism."
- ... broke bread in their homes ...
- ... and feasted together in joy and purity of heart. They praised God and found favor with all the people: this also highlights the harmony between the early Christians and the Jewish community. The praise of God united them.

Fixed liturgical structures or uniformity were not yet to be expected at the gatherings in the houses. It can be assumed that someone presided over the meal and opened it by breaking and sharing the bread. This is also indicated by the fixed term "breaking of bread" for the meal celebration. A reminder that some early Christians abstained from wine may have been preserved in Mk 14:25. The gatherings anticipated the imminent end times, which explains the great joy of the participants (Acts 2:46). It can be assumed that the scriptures were read out at the meetings and interpreted with a view to their own everyday lives and the significance of Jesus Christ (Christology). In this respect, the gatherings were places where early Christian traditions could develop. The communal prayer of supplication was considered to be particularly effective (cf. Mt 18:19-20) and is likely to have played an important role in the gatherings. The Lord's Prayer is the only early Christian prayer form that has been passed down. The early Christian call to prayer Maranatha ("Our Lord, come!") is attested by Paul, the Didache and (in Greek translation) Rev 22:20-21. Based on the Didache, it can be assumed that this call to Maranatha concluded the early Christian celebration of the Eucharist. The feeding miracles in the Gospels can be interpreted in terms of the early Christian celebration of the meal. They show that they were filling main meals that were celebrated as a foreshadowing of the end-time banquet of joy.

Baptism by immersion in water (preferably running water) was the initiation rite of the early church. A very old baptismal formula is recorded in Acts 2:38. According to this, the person being baptized pronounced the name of Jesus and thereby became the property of the Messiah, whose end-time return was expected. He was thus protected in a special way in the threats of the end times. His sins were forgiven and he received the Holy Spirit. It can be assumed from the ancient gloss Acts 8:37 that the baptized person also made a profession of faith.

The first sermons of Peter, which Luke edited, reflect the basic ideas of the early Christian mission: for them, Jesus was the bringer of salvation for God's people announced throughout Israel's entire biblical history, whose death on the cross as the final judgment fulfilled the promises of blessing to the patriarchs, whose resurrection brought about God's reconciliation with Israel, opened salvation to the nations and called the listeners of the sermon to comprehensive repentance.

The creedal formulas taken up by Paul also place Jesus' self-giving and his resurrection by God at the center of the early Christian doctrine of faith.

== Community of goods ==
Whether the members of the Jerusalem church actually lived without property and shared all their possessions is disputed. Some exegetes point out that Luke presents the early church as the realization of "social utopias of an ideal community often found in ancient philosophy." An analogous tradition is, for example, Pythagoras' community of goods.

However, very early passages in the Q source already define the lack of possessions as a condition of following Jesus (Mt 10:9f). This is because the disciples belonged to the beggarly poor (Greek: ptochoi), who made up the majority of the Galilean and Judean population (ochlos) at the time. Based on the beatitudes of Jesus' Sermon on the Mount, they were regarded as the true chosen people of God (Mt 4:1-11). The rich were also invited to give up their possessions in order to become Jesus' disciples (Mk 10:21). For formerly wealthy followers of Jesus, this was not just general charity, but an obligatory part of neighbourly love towards the poor (cf. Lk 6:27-35).

The sharing of possessions and food, community of goods and feeding the poor was also practised in other Jewish end-time communities, such as the presumed Qumran group, who, however, did not turn to the majority of the people, but withdrew into the desert as a "holy remnant". In Jesus' case, on the other hand, the giving up of possessions was not aimed at ascetic perfection, but at the real earthly anticipation of the heavenly justice that God had promised the poor with the coming of the Messiah (Lk 4:16-21). For example, the possessions of tax collectors ("tax collectors") were regarded as plunder, acquired at the expense of their impoverished and indebted compatriots. The followers of Jesus were to go through all areas of Israel to proclaim the imminent kingdom of God and thus the imminent end of these exploitative conditions (Mt 10:5-15), without worrying about accumulating possessions and making a living like rich people (Mt 6:24-33).

It was not until Luke's time, when the early Christian mission had reached the wealthy coastal towns of Asia Minor, that Jesus' disciples' natural task of giving up their possessions became a moral appeal, which was apparently only followed in exceptional cases and was therefore emphasized (Acts 4:36f). Luke therefore highlighted examples in his Gospel where Jesus persuaded relatively rich people like Zacchaeus to return their possessions to those who had been robbed (Luke 19:1-11). Some sold all their possessions and brought the money to the apostles, who used it to provide for the entire community (Acts 4:32-37 [1]). This care for the poor was no longer a sign of solidarity within the Jewish people, but served to equalize the wealth of poorer and richer Christians within the community. However, this remained unusual within the ancient society and attractive to the poorer classes. There are only certain parallels to support in Hellenistic associations.

According to Acts 5:1-11, a married couple (Ananias and Sapphira) died after transferring only part of the proceeds of the land they had sold to the early church. According to one interpretation, keeping property that belonged to everyone for oneself was a taboo here: Anyone who kept back any of their property was "betraying" the Holy Spirit himself and thus losing their right to live. According to another interpretation, the radical renunciation of possessions was voluntary (cf. Acts 5:4) and was particularly praised by Barnabas (Acts 4:36-37). However, Ananias and Sapphira took this step half-heartedly, which was interpreted as an attempt to deceive God and the Holy Spirit. Schenke suspects that some Jerusalem Christians "owned houses, land and capital. They were not 'expropriated'." Thus, giving up property was not legally institutionalized, but rather made available to all fellow Christians, for example their own house as a meeting place. According to Schenke, the money collected through sales went into a "common fund", which was used for social emergencies, perhaps also for the purchase of burial sites.

Luke's depiction of the early Christian community of goods has sometimes been interpreted as an early form of communism. However, this term also includes the upheaval of production relations, which is not mentioned in the book of Acts. Since the early church saw itself as an anticipation of the end-time people of God, its expectations of salvation, like those of Judaism, also indirectly included the future radical change in property and power relations (cf. Lk 1:46-55 ). The ideal of the community of goods, which anticipated this expectation, has continued to have an impact in many ways in the history of Christianity, for example in some monastic orders, monastic communities and basic ecclesial communities.

== Groups and conflicts ==
According to the Acts of the Apostles, the members of the early church initially lived together in harmony. But the growth of the church soon brought problems. According to Acts 6:1-6, the widows from the Greek-speaking part of the church were overlooked in the daily care of the poor. This indicates that this sub-group was organizationally independent; perhaps the Aramaic-speaking early Christians also had reservations about them. As a result, the general assembly of the early church selected seven "deacons" (helpers, servants) to ensure that everyone was cared for fairly. Stephen, Philip, Prochorus, Nicanor, Timon, Parmenas and Nicholas were named.

Their task is unclear: they are not reported to have performed diaconal services, but Stephen (Acts 6:8) and Philip (Acts 8:4-13; Acts 8:26-40) acted as missionaries. Their election is therefore not only seen as a solution to an administrative problem, but also as an indication of conflicts between Jewish Christians and Hellenistic Jewish Christians in Jerusalem. Apparently, the leadership role of the apostles there was disputed early on. This may also have been related to material problems: The early church received donations for the poor from the other new Christian communities (Gal 2:10; Acts 11:29). With their election, the Hellenists in the early church evidently received the right to distribute it and thus a certain degree of autonomy.

This internal conflict was accompanied by the distrust of the highest Jewish authority in Jerusalem, the Sanhedrin. According to Acts 4, it interrogated Peter and John and tried to stop their missionary preaching. However, the sympathy of the people had preserved the leaders of the early church (Acts 4:21). After their re-arrest, it was the advice of the Pharisee Gamaliel that secured their release (Acts 5:34-40). Hans Conzelmann points out that the Pharisees are portrayed several times in Luke as being relatively well-disposed towards the Christians because both groups shared a belief in the resurrection.

The beginnings of the Gentile mission probably came from the Hellenists, as their leader Stephen criticized the Mosaic Law and the temple cult (Acts 6:13f). He publicly accused the Sanhedrin of breaking the law and of murdering Jesus. This was followed by a religious trial that ended with his stoning (Acts 7:56). As a result, part of the early church was expelled from Jerusalem and dispersed into the neighboring regions. The circle of twelve remained in Jerusalem as the nucleus of a rebuilding of the early church (Acts 8:1). From then on, however, Luke reports nothing more about them.

Hellenistic missionaries such as Philip founded new churches (Acts 8:40), so that Christianity expanded into Samaria, Syria and Asia Minor. The first large mixed congregation of Jews and Gentiles besides Jerusalem was founded in the Asia Minor metropolis of Antioch. Apparently, it was made easier or waived for these new Christians to observe the Jewish commandments: This is why they were fiercely persecuted by Jews loyal to the Torah, such as the Pharisee Paul, on behalf of the Sanhedrin (Acts 8:1). However, after his unexpected conversion, he advocated a Torah-free mission to the nations and initially carried out missionary work in the Mediterranean region independently of the apostles of the early church (Acts 8–10).

== The Apostolic Council ==
After the expulsion and flight of the Hellenists, Peter and the Twelve gave up their sedentary lifestyle in Jerusalem and went about as itinerant missionaries, as they had already done during Jesus' lifetime. The model of the end-time pilgrimage of the nations to Zion faded; instead, Jerusalem became the starting point of a "centrifugal" early Christian mission of unprecedented intensity that encompassed the entire Mediterranean region. Peter, John and James were only occasionally to be found in Jerusalem, and no trace of the other apostles remains. In place of the college of twelve, James, the brother of Jesus, became the leader of the early church of Jerusalem, and other members of Jesus' family probably also took on leadership roles. For the first time, elders (presbyters) are now also mentioned in Jerusalem; this is probably the leadership college of the Aramaic-speaking early Christians, corresponding to the seven who led the Greek-speaking part of the church until the expulsion of the Hellenists. Schenke assumes that the Jewish Christian community led by James and the presbyteral college developed forms of organization in which a kind of "church discipline" was practised and sinners were excluded if rebuke was unsuccessful.

The early Christian Hellenists also turned to Greeks who had no Jewish background. As a result, the proportion of so-called Gentile Christians - newly baptized people of non-Jewish descent - in early Christianity grew. Jewish regulations were imposed on them in many communities. Initially, the "Judaizers" among the apostles of the early church probably also tolerated this; Paul reports no restrictions after his first visit to Jerusalem, where he met Jesus' brother James (Gal 1:18f). However, tensions later arose between him and Peter, whom Luke portrays as the first missionary to the Gentiles (Acts 10), over the issue of purity laws (Acts 11). Apparently, the leaders of the early church disagreed as to whether the Gentile Christians should be subject to certain conditions and if so, which ones.

The different approaches of the missionaries called into question the leadership role and identity of the early church and threatened the unity of early Christianity as a whole. The issue of circumcision, in particular, led to a crucial test: should Gentiles also be circumcised at baptism and thus obliged to observe the entire Jewish Torah? If they did not observe their eating and purity laws, the common meal between Christians of Jewish and Gentile origin in the congregations would also become a problem. This raised the fundamental theological question of whether being a Christian was only possible as part of Judaism or whether this boundary was no longer valid.

This fundamentally affected the self-image of the early church: it saw itself primarily as the "vanguard" of God's people Israel, who had yet to be saved, saved by the Messiah from sin and divine wrath. According to this, Gentile Christians were " called ones" who owed their salvation entirely to the "excess of grace" of the mediator of salvation, Jesus Christ. The lack of clarity as to what this meant in relation to the "covenant of God with Israel (Brit)" and the instructions given to Israel by God (Torah) pushed for a binding solution.

The insistence of some Jerusalem apostles that the Jewish commandments were also binding for Gentile Christians caused a lack of understanding among the Hellenistic apostles. There was a threat of a division into congregations of Jewish Christians and Gentile Christians. To prevent this, both sides asserted all their authority. The Jerusalem apostles summoned a meeting of the missionaries to settle the dispute; on the way there, Barnabas and Paul became spokesmen for the Gentile Christian churches (Acts 15:1-3).

The so-called Apostles' Council (also known as the Apostles' Convention) was a decisive turning point in the history of early Christianity. Paul and Luke describe its course and results differently. According to Acts 15, there was a plenary meeting of the early church at which the Judaizers initially argued that the circumcision of the Gentile Christians was necessary. This was followed by an internal debate between Peter, Barnabas, Paul, James and probably others. The essence of the law-free Gentile mission according to Gal 2:1-14 was confirmed. This prevented the division of early Christianity. However, the validity of the Jewish ritual laws remained a controversial issue afterwards.

== Further events ==
The early church had survived the persecution after the execution of Stephen (around 36) (Acts 7:59) as well as the execution of James the Great under Herod Agrippa I (44) (Acts 12:2) and was therefore still tolerated by the leading groups of Judaism. It was therefore able to send out its missionaries to the Jews and Gentiles from Jerusalem to the surrounding regions.

Notes in the Gospels reveal the regions in which new Christian communities were founded: Mk 3:7, for example, lists Idumea (in southern Judea), Perea (in the east) and Phoenicia (coastal region in the west) in addition to Galilee, Judea and Jerusalem. Instead, Mt 4:24 mentions the Decapolis, a Hellenistic confederation of cities on the East Bank, and Syria, while Lk 6:17 mentions Samaria as well as Phoenicia. After his conversion, Paul not only visited Damascus, but also "Arabia" (Gal 1:17): This meant the kingdom of the Nabataeans east of Judea at the time. If the information is added together, one gets a rough picture of the dispersion of the Christian communities in and around Palestine up to around 100.

After the Apostles' Council, the Acts of the Apostles almost exclusively depicts Paul's missionary journeys and offers hardly any news about the early church. The Jerusalem group of twelve had probably already been replaced by a committee of three under the leadership of Jesus' eldest brother (Mk 6:3), James (Gal 2:9); the other apostles no longer appear. Peter had left Jerusalem after the council and traveled around Asia Minor as a missionary (Gal 2:11-14; 1 Cor 9).

Only James and the "elders" are later mentioned again as recipients of the collection for the poor that Paul had been instructed to make at the council (Acts 21:15ff). It is therefore assumed that he had now become the sole leader of the early church. According to Gal 2:12, he apparently enforced the resolutions of the Apostles' Council outside Jerusalem and, according to Acts 21:21-25, supported the separation of the Jewish Christians from the Gentile Christians even after Paul's missionary successes. Until his death, the early church retained its pre-eminent position in early Christianity.

Although Paul had to fight against groups in his churches who rejected or distorted his law-free mission to the Gentiles, he did not identify their missionaries as his enemies (including the "super-apostles" in 2 Cor 11:5;12:11), but always recognized the primacy of the early church: This is confirmed by his collection for them in his letter to the Romans around 60 (Rom 15:25-28).

As a peripheral group of Palestinian Judaism, the early church of Jerusalem was severely affected by the intensifying conflicts between parts of the Jewish population and the Roman occupation. When Paul delivered his collection in Jerusalem, he found a large Jewish-Christian community that kept its distance from him. According to the Acts of the Apostles, Sicarii planned his murder. The First Epistle to the Thessalonians (written around 50), in which Paul vehemently polemicizes against the Jewish authorities persecuting his mission (1 Thess 2:14-16), seems to reflect a politically tense situation in which there was "harassment and hostility against Christians and Christian communities in Palestine".

According to Flavius Josephus, the Sadducees under the high priest Ananias II (Annas) took advantage of the power vacuum after the death of the governor Festus until the arrival of his successor to execute James with other Jewish Christians in Jerusalem. His death is dated to the year 62.

Eusebius of Caesarea wrote in the 4th century that most members of the Jerusalem early church had fled to the East Bank, to Pella, before the start of the Jewish War in 68. Ludger Schenke summarizes: "Palestinian Jewish Christianity was fighting for its existence in a hopeless situation. It was caught between all camps ... The Jerusalem early church left the city at the beginning of the Jewish War. Their trace ... is lost in the darkness of history."

Several authors of the early church claim to have information about the fate of the early church of Jerusalem after the destruction of the temple in the year 70: A remnant church had been re-established in the ruins of Jerusalem; sons of James and other relatives of Jesus had led it and ensured the continuity of its traditions. In the course of the Bar Kochba Revolt (132–135), this remnant church had fled Jerusalem for good.

== Bibliography ==
- Baus, Karl (1962). Von der Urgemeinde zur frühchristlichen Großkirche (in German). Vol. 1 (4th ed.). Freiburg: Herder.
- Conzelmann, Hans (1989). Geschichte des Urchristentums (= Grundrisse zum Neuen Testament). Vol. 5 (6th ed.). Göttingen: Vandenhoeck & Ruprecht. ISBN 3525513542.
- Goppelt, Leonhard (1978). Theologie des Neuen Testaments (= Uni-Taschenbücher. Band 850) (in German) (3rd ed.). Göttingen: Vandenhoeck & Ruprecht. ISBN 3525032528.
- Schenke, Ludger (1990). Die Urgemeinde. Geschichtliche und theologische Entwicklung (in German). Stuttgart: Kohlhammer. ISBN 3170110764.
- Hengel, Martin; Schwemer, Anna Maria (2019). Die Urgemeinde und das Judenchristentum, (Geschichte des frühen Christentums, Bd. II) (in German). Tübingen: Mohr Siebeck. ISBN 9783161494741.
