= Titus 1 =

- ← 2 Timothy 4 chapter 2 →
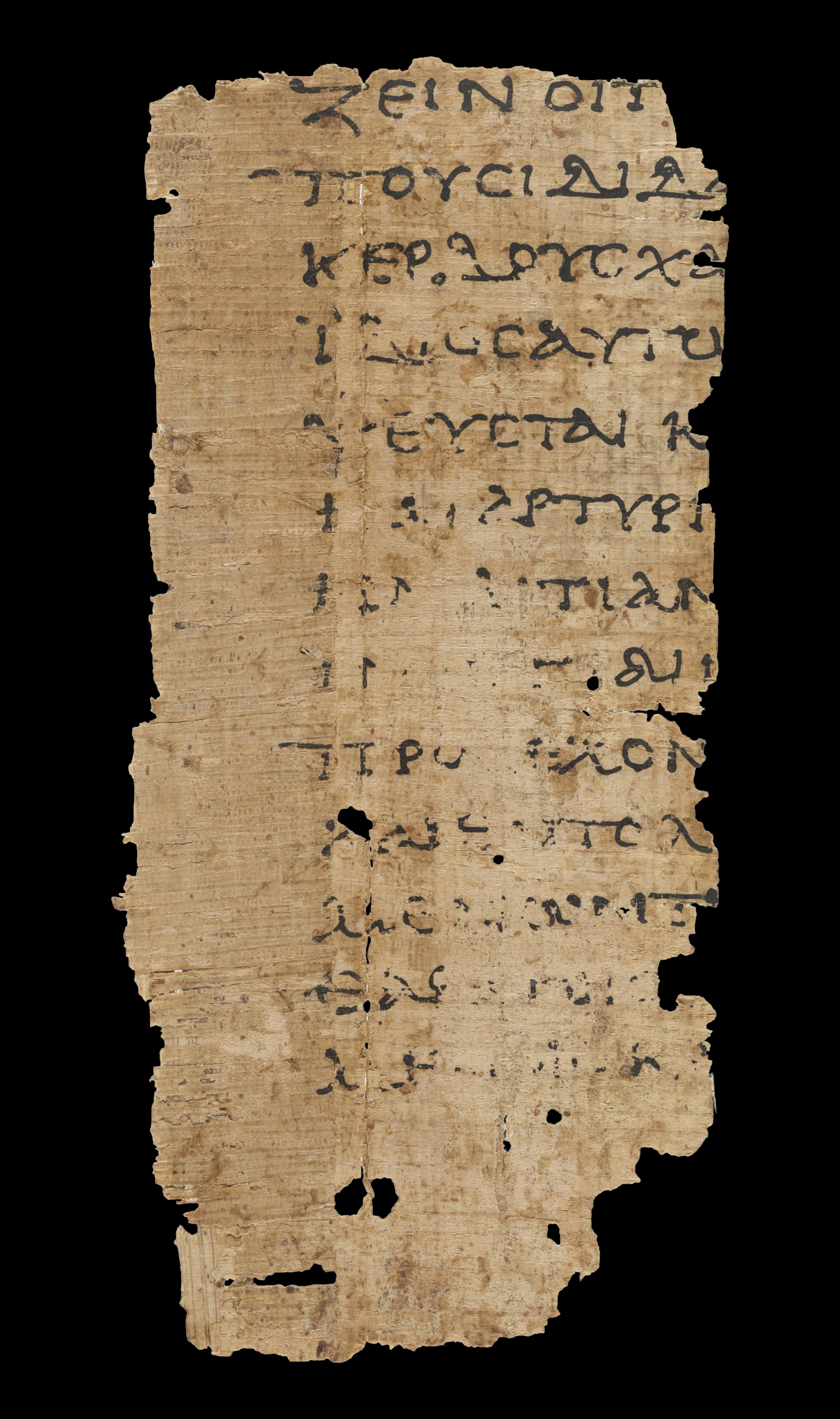
- Fragments of the Epistle to Titus 1:11–15 on Papyrus 32, from c. AD 200.
- Book: Epistle to Titus
- Category: Pauline epistles
- Christian Bible part: New Testament
- Order in the Christian part: 17

Titus 1 is the first chapter of the Epistle to Titus in the New Testament of the Christian Bible. The letter is traditionally attributed to Paul the Apostle, sent from Nicopolis of Macedonia (Roman province), addressed to Titus in Crete. Some scholars argue that it is the work of an anonymous follower, written after Paul's death in the first century AD. This chapter contains the greetings and instructions for Titus on dealing with deceivers.

== Text ==
The original text was written in Koine Greek. This chapter is divided into 16 verses.

=== Textual witnesses ===
Some early manuscripts containing the text of this chapter are:

- Papyrus 32 (~AD 200; extant verses 11–15)
- Codex Sinaiticus (330–360)
- Codex Alexandrinus (400–440)
- Codex Ephraemi Rescriptus (~450; extant verses 3–16)
- Codex Freerianus (~450; extant verses 1–3, 10–11)
- Codex Claromontanus (~550)
- Codex Coislinianus (~550; extant verses 1–3, 15–16)

== Opening greeting (1:1–4) ==
The opening of the epistle to Titus is the longest and most intricate of the epistles traditionally held to be written by Paul, exceeding the openings of most other Pauline epistles.

=== Verse 1–3 ===
^{1}Paul, a bondservant of God and an apostle of Jesus Christ, according to the faith of God's elect and the acknowledgment of the truth which accords with godliness, ^{2}in hope of eternal life which God, who cannot lie, promised before time began, ^{3}but has in due time manifested His word through preaching, which was committed to me according to the commandment of God our Savior;

— Titus 1:1–3, New King James Version

Included in this opening a summary of the gospel message, expounding the God's plan of salvation punctuated by the assertion that "God never lies". Verse 2 asserts that God is ἀψευδὴς, apseudēs, a single word meaning 'cannot lie', comparable to ἀδύνατον ψεύσασθαι θεόν, adunatov pseusasthai theov ('God cannot lie', or 'it is impossible for God to lie') in Hebrews 6:18.

In verses 2–3, the author highlights that Paul's mission is rooted in the certainty of God's promise of eternal life.

=== Verse 4 ===
To Titus, a true son in our common faith: Grace, mercy, and peace from God the Father and the Lord Jesus Christ our Savior.

— Titus 1:4, New King James Version

- "A true son" (NKJV; KJV: mine own son"; Greek: γνησίῳ τέκνῳ, gnēsiō teknō): Also "my genuine child" (as in 1 Timothy 1:2), that is, "converted by my instrumentality" (1 Corinthians 4:17; Philemon 10).
- "In our common faith" (NKJV; KJV: "After the common faith"; Greek: κατὰ κοινὴν πίστιν, kata koinēn pistin): the author treats Titus as "a genuine son" by virtue of "the faith common to all the people of God", a common brotherhood of Gentiles as well as Jews, thus embracing Titus who is a Gentile (2 Peter 1:1; Jude 1:3).
- "Grace, mercy, and peace" (Greek: χάρις ἔλεος εἰρήνη, charis, eleos, eirēnē): The word "mercy" is omitted in some of the oldest manuscripts, but one of the best and oldest manuscripts supports it (see 1 Timothy 1:2; 2 Timothy 1:2). There are many similarities of phrase in all the 'Pastoral Epistles' (the Epistles to Titus, 1 and 2 Timothy).

== The appointment of church officers (1:5–9) ==
The instructions for Titus run parallel to those for Timothy in 1 Timothy 3, but with some significant variations based on the distinct situation in Crete.

=== Verse 5 ===
For this reason I left you in Crete, that you should set in order the things that are lacking, and appoint elders in every city as I commanded you—

— Titus 1:5, New King James Version

- "Crete": an island in the Mediterranean which was mentioned in Acts 27, when Paul's ship sailed past on his way to Rome.

== Instructions on dealing with deceivers (1:10–16) ==
=== Verse 12 ===
One of them, a prophet of their own, said, "Cretans are always liars, evil beasts, lazy gluttons."

— Titus 1:12, New King James Version

- "One of them, a prophet of their own": refers to Epimenides, who wrote the cited words in one of his poems. The author calls him "one of them" (one of the Cretans), since Epimenides was a Cretian by birth, of the city of Gnossus, and according to a legend was sent by his father to his sheep in the field, when he at noon turned aside into a cave, and slept 57 years. The designation as a "prophet" is because in Crete there were prophets of Jupiter, and Epimenides might be one of them, but the word 'prophets' can also refer to the priests among other cults. for examples, Baal's priests were called the prophets of Baal, and the prophets of the groves (1 Kings 18:19). Epimenides was thought to be inspired by the gods in writing his poems that he is called by Apuleius, a famous fortune teller; and is said by Laertius to be very skillful in divination, and to have foretold many things which came to pass; also by the Grecians were supposed to be very dear to the gods; likewise, Balaam, the soothsayer and diviner, is called a prophet (2 Peter 2:16). Add to this, that the passage next cited stands in a poem of this writer, entitled, "Concerning Oracles"; and it is easy to observe, that poets in common were usually called "vates", or prophets; so that the author speaks here with great propriety.
- "Cretans are always liars": Epimenides wrote of the living of the inhabitants of the Crete as a sin common to human nature, that lying was "always" a governing vice among them, for instances, for saying that Jupiter's sepulchre was with them, when it was the sepulchre of Minos his son, which they had fraudulently obliterated; and for which Callimachus charges them with lying, and uses these very words of Epimenides; though he assigns a different reason from that now given, which is, that Jupiter died not, but always exists, and therefore his sepulchre could not be with them, but more than that, seemingly the Cretians regard lying as their national sin; and beside Epimenides, also said by others. Crete is called "mendax Creta", 'lying Crete' by Ovid. Hence, with the Grecians, to "cretize", is proverbially used for to lie; this is a sin, than which nothing makes a man more like the devil, or more infamous among men, or more abominable to God. The Ethiopian version, instead of Cretes, or Cretians, reads "hypocrites".
- "Evil beasts": are meant beasts of prey, savage and mischievous ones (Genesis 37:20; Genesis 37:33), to distinguish them from other beasts, as sheep, and the like.
- "Lazy gluttons" (NKJV; KJV: "slow bellies"): This expression by Epimenides is partly for the intemperance, gluttony and drunkenness of the Cretans, whose god was their belly, not the Lord Jesus, and partly for their laziness, eating other people's bread without working.

=== Verse 13 ===
This is true. So reprimand them sternly to make them strong in the faith."

— Titus 1:13, New Living Translation

=== Verse 14 ===
not paying attention to Jewish myths and commandments of men who turn away from the truth."

— Titus 1:14, New American Standard Bible

== See also ==
- Crete
- Elder (Christianity)
- Saint Titus
- Related Bible parts: 1 Timothy 3

== Sources ==
- Guthrie, Donald (1994). "The Pastoral Letters". In Carson, D. A.; France, R. T.; Motyer, J. A.; Wenham, G. J. (eds.). New Bible Commentary: 21st Century Edition (4, illustrated, reprint, revised ed.). Inter-Varsity Press. pp. 1292–1315. ISBN 9780851106489.
- Drury, Clare (2007). "73. The Pastoral Epistles". In Barton, John; Muddiman, John (eds.). The Oxford Bible Commentary (first (paperback) ed.). Oxford University Press. pp. 1220–1233. ISBN 978-0199277186.
- Towner, Philip H. (2006). Bruce, Frederick Fyvie (ed.). The Letters to Timothy and Titus. The New International Commentary on the New Testament. Wm. B. Eerdmans Publishing. ISBN 9780802825131.
