= Alexander the Coppersmith =

Biblical figure mentioned in the New Testament

Alexander the Coppersmith (Greek: Ἀλέξανδρος ὁ χαλκεὺς) is a person in the New Testament, mentioned in 2 Timothy 4:14, which states, "Alexander the coppersmith did me great harm; the Lord will repay him according to his deeds."

Paul Jeon notes that Alexander "serves almost as an anti-type to Christ," who showed grace to Paul. Aída Besançon Spencer suggests that while "Demas had been a passive opponent (4:9), Alexander was an active opponent".

Some scholars identify him with the Alexander of Acts 19:33, the Alexander of 1 Timothy 1:20, (whom, along with Hymenaeus, Paul "handed over to Satan that they may learn not to blaspheme"), or both. Others suggest, however, that he is called "the coppersmith" in order to distinguish him from others of the same name.

Alexander was probably a resident of Troas, where there was an association of metalworkers.

William Penn referred to Alexander in the title of his 1673 pamphlet The spirit of Alexander the copper-smith lately revived, published in his controversy with John Perrot over authority in the Society of Friends.
