= Titus 3 =

- ← chapter 2 Philemon →
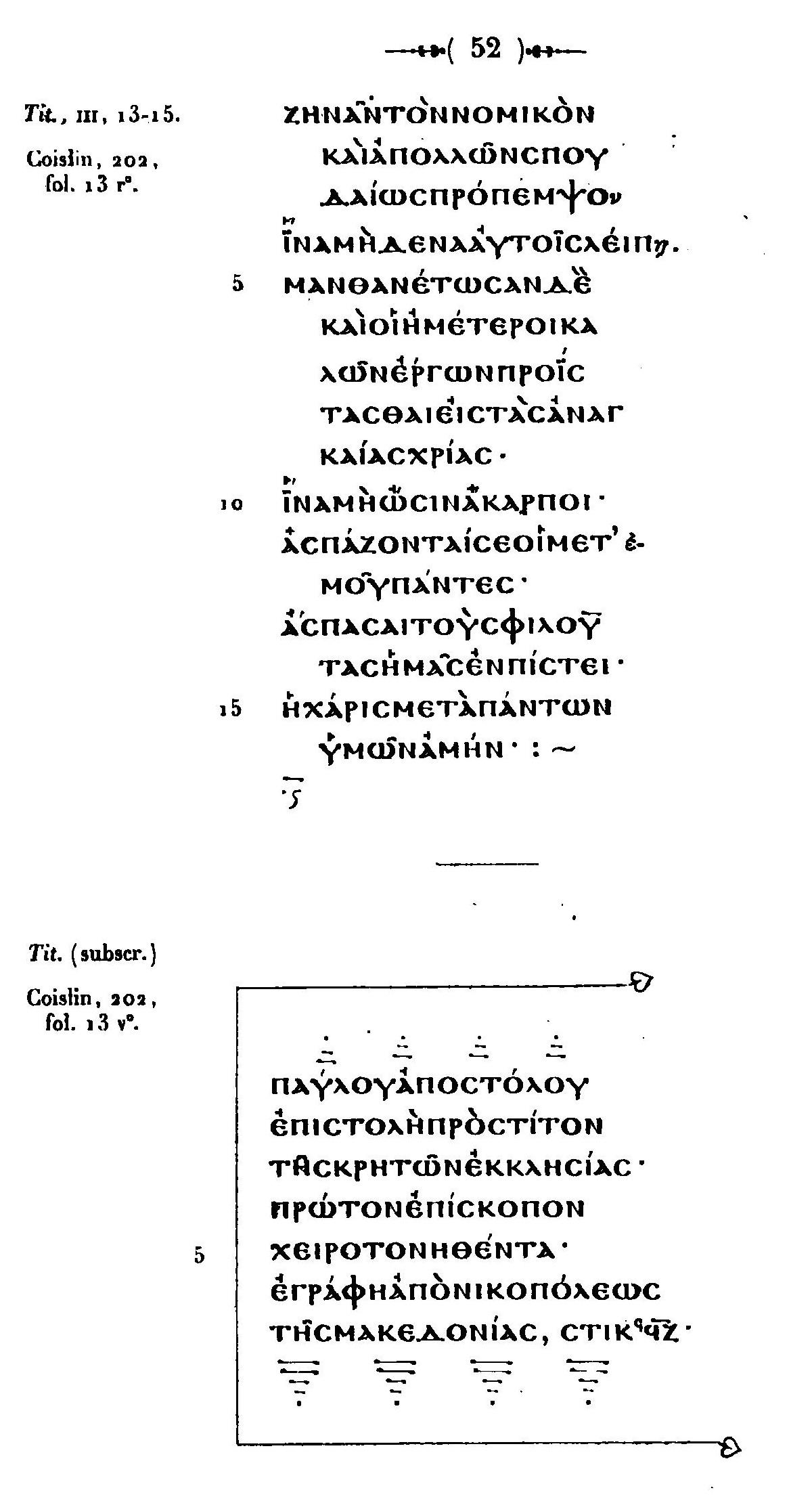
- The ending of the Epistle to Titus (Titus 3:13–15) with a "subscription" in Codex Coislinianus (6th century), from facsimile of H. Omont (1889)
- Book: Epistle to Titus
- Category: Pauline epistles
- Christian Bible part: New Testament
- Order in the Christian part: 17

Titus 3 is the third and final chapter of the Epistle to Titus in the New Testament of the Christian Bible. The letter is traditionally attributed to Paul the Apostle, sent from Nicopolis of Macedonia (Roman province), addressed to Titus in Crete. Some scholars argue that it is the work of an anonymous follower, written after Paul's death in the first century AD. This chapter contains the author's instruction for the church as a community with responsibilities in the public realm, towards the government and also towards individuals, concluded with some personal requests for Titus before the final benediction.

== Text ==
The original text was written in Koine Greek. This chapter is divided into 15 verses.

=== Textual witnesses ===
Some early manuscripts containing the text of this chapter are:

- Codex Sinaiticus (AD 330–360)
- Codex Alexandrinus (400–440)
- Codex Ephraemi Rescriptus (c. 450; complete)
- Codex Freerianus (c. 450; extant verses 8–9)
- Codex Claromontanus (c. 550)
- Codex Coislinianus (c. 550; extant verses 13–15, with unique endnotes)

== Living as the church in the world (3:1–8) ==
Verses 1–8 address the responsibilities of the church as a community within wider society, from consideration for rulers and authorities to demonstrating "perfect courtesy" or "gentleness" in relation to "all people" (Titus 3:2; cf. Romans 13:1–7, and 1 Peter 2:13–17). The author calls on Titus to "remind them" (the believers) of their obligations of right conduct; A. E. Humphreys notes that "them" must refer to "the Cretan Christians" generally.

=== Verse 3 ===
For we ourselves also were sometimes foolish, disobedient, deceived, serving divers lusts and pleasures, living in malice and envy, hateful, and hating one another.

— Titus 3:3, King James Version

"Sometimes" (in the King James Version) is best read as "previously" rather than "occasionally". Humphreys refers to an "old sense" of "sometime".

=== Verse 8 ===
This is a faithful saying, and these things I will that thou affirm constantly, that they which have believed in God might be careful to maintain good works. These things are good and profitable unto men.

— Titus 3:8, King James Version

- "This is a faithful saying" (Πιστὸς ὁ λόγος, pistos ho logos): this phrase is a formula assuming 'general acceptance' and is stated 5 times in the Pastoral Epistles (1 Timothy 1:15; 3:1; 4:9; 2 Timothy 2:11; Titus 3:8).

== Disciplining the opponents in the church (3:9–11) ==
Verses 9–11 concern relationships between Titus and some members in the community who "indulge in controversy and argument", with an instruction that Titus should ignore them to their own condemnation.

=== Verse 9 ===
But avoid foolish disputes, genealogies, contentions, and strivings about the law; for they are unprofitable and useless.

— Titus 3:9, New King James Version

Paul lists four "deceptively dangerous things" to be avoided (or "shunned"):

- "Foolish disputes": or "foolish controversies" for frivolous and incompetent theological inquiries which produce no worthwhile results (cf. 1 Timothy 1:4)
- "Genealogies": likely refers to 'a Jewish type of interpretation' based on the Old Testament or extracanonical biblical heroes accounts and 'speculation based on family trees' (cf. 1 Timothy 1:4)
- "Contentions, and strivings": or "arguments, dissensions, quarrels" (cf. 1 Timothy 6:4) depicting the "chaos produced by controversies and speculative debates".

== Final remarks and farewell (3:12–15) ==
The closing section of the epistle contains some personal details from the author regarding some co-workers, with a final instruction to "maintain good works" (verse 14) before the closing benediction. The form is a kind of travelogue, which is not unusual as Paul also mentioned his travel plans in other epistles.

=== Verse 12 ===
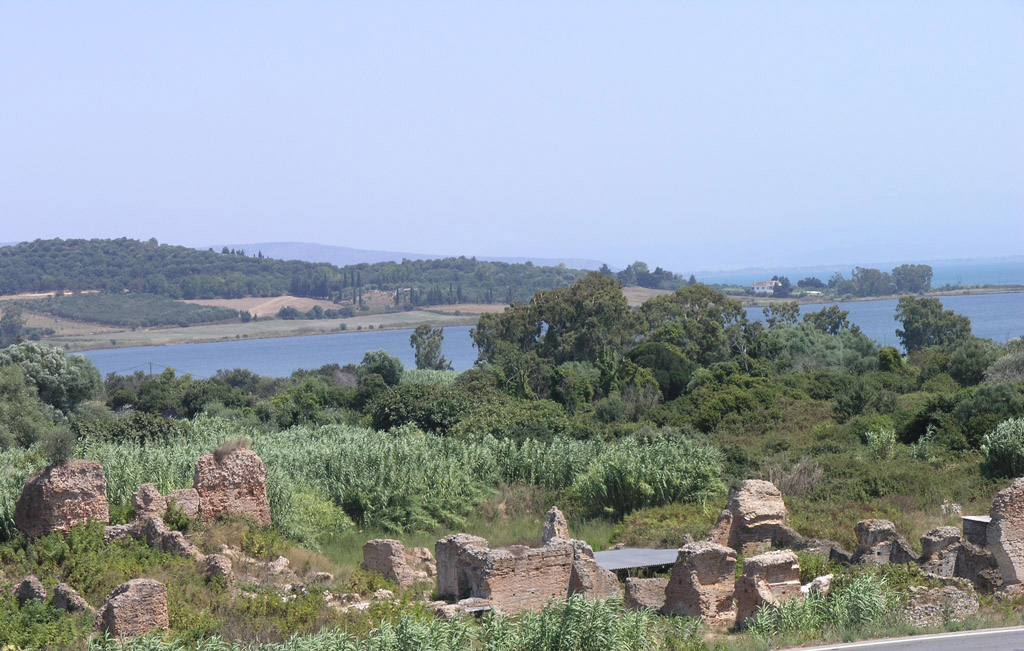
The central thermae of Nicopolis.

When I send Artemas to you, or Tychicus, be diligent to come to me at Nicopolis, for I have decided to spend the winter there.

— Titus 3:12, New King James Version

- "Tychicus": from the province of Asia, traveled with Paul on his third missionary journey (Acts 20:4; Ephesians 6:21; Colossians 4:7; 1 Timothy 4:12), but nothing is known about Artemas.
- "Come to me at Nicopolis": Artemas and Tychicus are sent to 'fill in for Titus', showing the author's concern for the succession in ministry. As soon as relief has arrived, Titus was to go to Nicopolis, where the author planned to stay throughout the winter.
- "Nicopolis" ("city of victory"; known as 'Nicopolos in Epirus'): or 'Nicopolis of Achaia' There are several imperial settlements with this name to commemorate a military victory, but this particular city was built on the isthmus of the Bay of Actium, across from the southern tip of the Italian peninsula, to commemorate the naval victory of Augustus over Mark Antony in 31 BCE. The port city was "a natural site of maritime transportation between Achaia and Italy, a commercial center and the site of quadrennial athletic games", as well as "a natural place for a person to pass the winter here before a sea voyage in the early spring" when travel conditions became better (cf. 1 Corinthians 16:6; Acts 27:9-12).

=== Verse 13 ===
Send Zenas the lawyer and Apollos on their journey with haste, that they may lack nothing.

— Titus 3:13, New King James Version

- "Apollos": is known from 1 Corinthians 1:12, 3:4-6, 22, 4:6 and Acts 18:24, 19:1, as an Alexandrian who was versed in the Scriptures, catechized by Aquila and Priscilla in the ways of the Lord. In one occasion, Paul tried to send Apollos to visit the Corinthian community again, but Apollos was reluctant to go (1 Corinthians 16:1).
- "Zenas the lawyer" is unknown, and does not appear elsewhere in the New Testament. The name is a contraction of Zēnodōros ('gift of Zeus'). According to the Greek menologies, Zenas was the first bishop of Diospolis of Lydda in Palestine, and according to tradition, wrote a letter to Titus.
- "Sent... on their journey with haste": is translated from Greek: σπουδαίως πρόπεμψον, spoudaiōs propempson, meaning 'earnestly equip', recalling the words in the previous verse: pempsō ('I shall send' or 'delegate') and spoudason ('be diligent' or 'make every effort'). The compound form in this verse has the meaning of both 'send on one's way' and 'prepare for a journey' by providing food, money, means of travel, companions or anything else required for the trip.
- "That they may lack nothing" (Greek: ἵνα μηδὲν αὐτοῖς λείπῃ, hina mēden autois leipē): can be paraphrased as '[make sure] that they lack nothing that they need' which in combination with the word propemson (cf. Romans 15:24; 1 Corinthians 16:6; 2 Corinthians 1:16) can form a translation: "Get Zenas the lawyer and Apollos ready and send them on their way".

=== Verse 14 ===
And let our people also learn to maintain good works, to meet urgent needs, that they may not be unfruitful.

- "Our people (NKJV; KJV: "ours"; Greek hoi hēmeteroi): in a narrow epistolary context can be about Zenas and Apollos.
- "Good works" (Greek kalōn ergōn): can be rendered "good deeds" or "honest trades", as in 'honest lawful employment of life' as a good work, or also 'a secularized euphemism for the proclamation of the gospel in word and in work'. Jewish teachings also state

"there are four things which a man should constantly attend to with all his might, and they are these; the law, "good works", prayer, and "the way of the earth", or "business"; if a tradesman, to his trade; if a merchant, to his merchandise; if a man of war to war."

- "That they may not be unfruitful": or "so that they are not ineffective" (Greek: a-karpoi, literally means "without fruit"), in the good works and in the knowledge of Christ, for good works are fruits of righteousness (fruit of the Spirit), because without them are like trees without fruit, which is useless and unprofitable. The imagery of growth and fruit (karpos) is often used in the early church in its kerygmatic discourse, and evokes the positive effect of the gospel proclamation (cf. Matthew 13:8; Mark 4:7–8; Luke 8:8).

=== Verse 15 ===
All who are with me greet you.
Greet those who love us in the faith.
Grace be with you all. Amen.

- "Grace be with you all": is a benediction to end the letter, with the difference to other benedictions in 1 Timothy 6:21 and 2 Timothy 4:22 (cf. Colossians 4:18) only in the addition of "all" (cf. Hebrews 13:25) which extends the blessing to the churches that Titus was caring at the time.

== Subscription ==
Places mentioned (red) and related (blue) in the Mediterranean

A subscription or 'codicil' appeared at the end of the Epistle of Titus, first in the Codex Coislinianus (6th century) and later in most manuscripts of Byzantine tradition, stating:

The epistle was written by Paul the Apostle to Titus the first bishop of the Church of the Cretans upon whom hands had been laid, from Nicopolis to Macedonia.

Minuscule 81 (AD 1044) has an alternative addition: "Written to Titus from Nicopolis in Crete", whereas Codex Alexandrinus (5th century) and Codex Porphyrianus (9th century) have a simple notation, "written from Nicopolis".

== See also ==
- Apollos
- Artemas
- Jesus Christ
- Torah
- Related Bible parts: Romans 12, Romans 13, Titus 2, 1 Peter 2

== Sources ==
- Collins, Raymond F. (2002). 1 & 2 Timothy and Titus: A Commentary. New Testament Library (reprint ed.). Presbyterian Publishing Corp. ISBN 9780664238902.
- Drury, Clare (2007). "73. The Pastoral Epistles". In Barton, John; Muddiman, John (eds.). The Oxford Bible Commentary (first (paperback) ed.). Oxford University Press. pp. 1220–1233. ISBN 978-0199277186.
- Towner, Philip H. (2006). Bruce, Frederick Fyvie (ed.). The Letters to Timothy and Titus. The New International Commentary on the New Testament. Wm. B. Eerdmans Publishing. ISBN 9780802825131.
