= Titus 2 =

- ← chapter 1 chapter 3 →
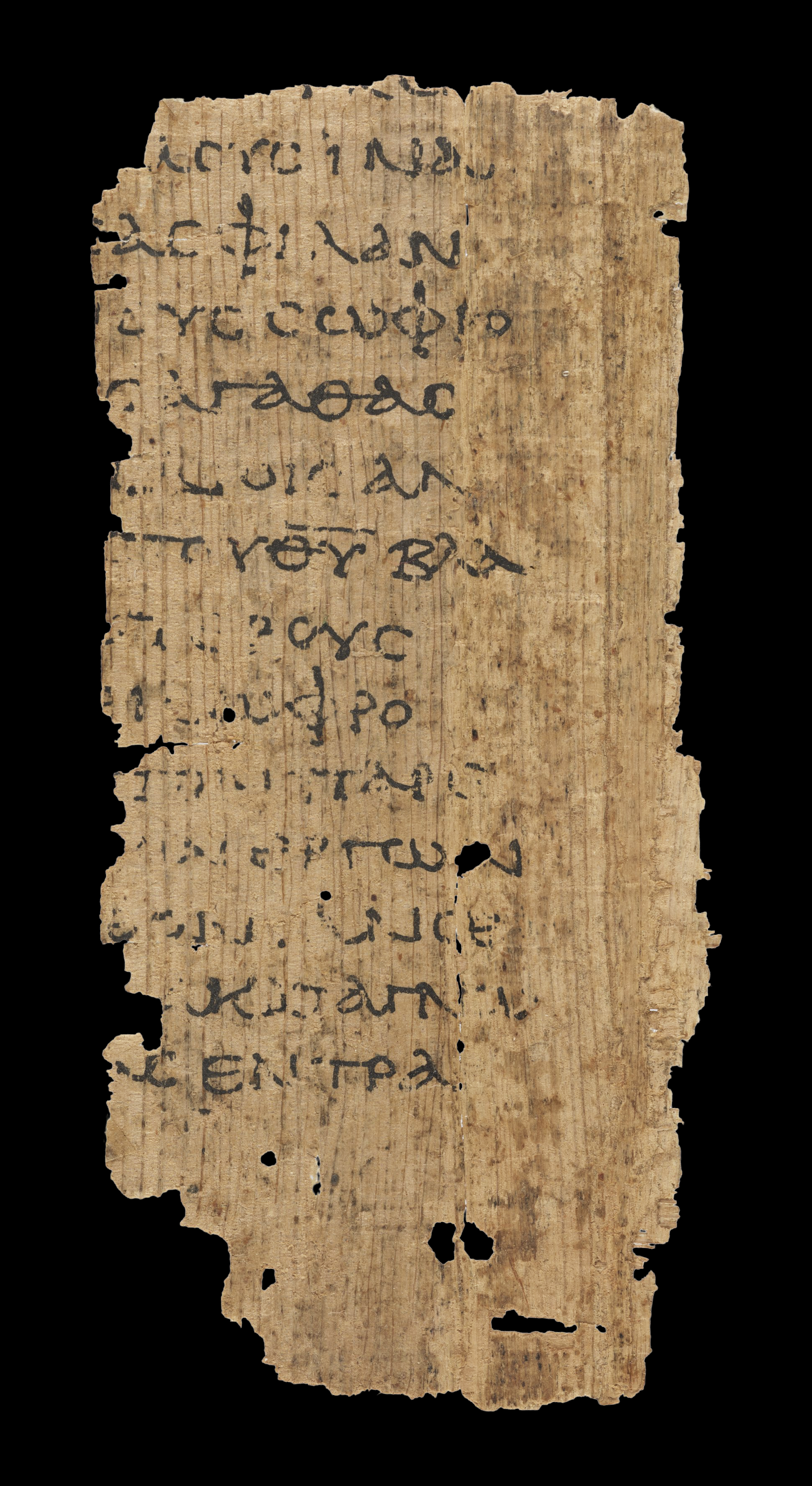
- Fragments of the Epistle to Titus 2:3–8 on Papyrus 32, from c. AD 200.
- Book: Epistle to Titus
- Category: Pauline epistles
- Christian Bible part: New Testament
- Order in the Christian part: 17

Titus 2 is the second chapter of the Epistle to Titus in the New Testament of the Christian Bible. The letter is traditionally attributed to Paul the Apostle, sent from Nicopolis of Macedonia (Roman province), addressed to Titus in Crete. Some scholars argue that it is the work of an anonymous follower, written after Paul's death in the first century AD. This chapter describes the qualities of members of the community and doctrinal statements regarding the death of Christ in relation to the removal of sin.

== Text ==
The original text was written in Koine Greek. This chapter is divided into 15 verses.

=== Textual witnesses ===
Some early manuscripts containing the text of this chapter are:

- Papyrus 32 (~AD 200; extant verses 3–8)
- Codex Sinaiticus (330–360)
- Codex Alexandrinus (400–440)
- Codex Ephraemi Rescriptus (~450; complete)
- Codex Freerianus (~450; extant verses 4–6, 14–15)
- Codex Claromontanus (~550)
- Codex Coislinianus (~550; extant verses 1–5)

== Membership of the community (2:1–10) ==
Verses 1–10 contain an injunction to Titus to teach 'sound doctrine' (τῇ ὑγιαινούσῃ διδασκαλίᾳ, tē hygiainousē didaskalia) to the community with a list of qualities and duties for the members, in contrast to the "unseemly doctrine" highlighted in chapter 1. 1 Timothy 1:10 uses the same term, 'sound doctrine'.

== Doctrinal statements (2:11–15) ==
The doctrinal statements in this part are typical of Paul's teaching, which links the incarnation and sacrifice of Christ to the hope and expectation of his second coming.

=== Verse 14 ===
Who gave himself for us, that he might redeem us from all iniquity, and purify unto himself a peculiar people, zealous of good works.

— Titus 2:14, King James Version

- "A peculiar people": translated from the Greek phrase Ancient Greek: λαὸν περιούσιον, romanized: laon periousion, which is found only here in the whole New Testament but is used multiple times in Greek Septuagint version of some Old Testament (Hebrew Bible) verses to translate the Hebrew phrase עַם סְגֻלָּה (Exodus 19:5 λαός περιούσιος, 'a peculiar treasure' (KJV); Deuteronomy 7:6 λαόν περιούσιον, 'special people' (KJV); Deuteronomy 14:2 λαόν αυτώ περιούσιον, 'a peculiar people' (KJV); Deuteronomy 26:18 λαόν περιούσιον, 'peculiar people' (KJV)).

The word סְגֻלָּה means 'a valued property, a peculiar treasure" (Latin: peculium), and when appearing alone translated in the Greek Septuagint version as εἰς περιουσιασμόν in Psalm 135:4 and εἰς περιποίησι in Malachi 3:17; this last rendition is cited in Ephesians 1:14 (εἰς ἀπολύτρωσιν τῆς περιποιήσεως) and 1 Peter 2:9 (λαὸς εἰς περιποίησιν, KJV: "a peculiar people", in which λαός, laos, 'people' recalls of the Septuagint rendering of the passages in Exodus and Deuteronomy). περιούσιος, periousios may refer to 'the treasure as laid up', and περιποίησις, peripoiēsis, may refer to 'the treasure as acquired'.

=== Verse 15 ===
Speak these things, exhort, and rebuke with all authority. Let no one despise you.

— Titus 2:15, New King James Version

This summary command to Titus contains three previously mentioned didactic terms:

1. "speak/teach" (in 2:1) about "these things", referring to the matters in the preceding paragraphs (2:1–14)
2. "exhort/encourage" (in 2:6)
3. "rebuke/reproof" (in 1:13)

recalling 'the job description of the overseer' (1:9), which Titus must do himself.

- "Let no one despise you": is an indirect command in the third person to strengthen Titus, which is similar in form and content to 1 Timothy 4:12 for Timothy. Philip Towner offers a paraphrase:

Titus, even if someone disrespects your authority, do not be dissuaded from your task.

== See also ==
- Jesus
- Related Bible parts: 1 Timothy 3

== Bibliography ==
- Drury, Clare (2007). "73. The Pastoral Epistles". In Barton, John; Muddiman, John (eds.). The Oxford Bible Commentary (first (paperback) ed.). Oxford University Press. pp. 1220–1233. ISBN 978-0199277186.
- Towner, Philip H. (2006). Bruce, Frederick Fyvie (ed.). The Letters to Timothy and Titus. The New International Commentary on the New Testament. Wm. B. Eerdmans Publishing. ISBN 9780802825131.
