= 2 Timothy 3 =

- ← chapter 2 chapter 4 →
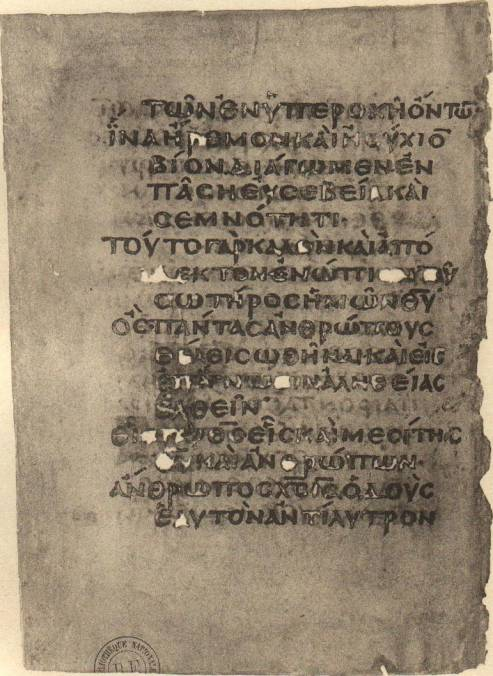
- Fragments showing 1 Timothy 2:2–6 on Codex Coislinianus, from ca. AD 550.
- Book: Second Epistle to Timothy
- Category: Pauline epistles
- Christian Bible part: New Testament
- Order in the Christian part: 16

2 Timothy 3 is the third chapter of the Second Epistle to Timothy in the New Testament of the Christian Bible. The letter is traditionally attributed to Paul the Apostle, the last one written in Rome before his death (c. 64 or 67), addressed to Timothy. However, most biblical scholars believe that it and the other Pastoral Epistles are the work of an anonymous follower, writing after Paul's death in the first century AD. This chapter contains a charge to Timothy to keep away from heterodoxy, and use Paul's steadfast faith under persecution as an example to contrast the opponents' characters, while continuing to follow the teachings of the Scriptures.

== Text ==
The original text was written in Koine Greek. This chapter is divided into 17 verses.

=== Textual witnesses ===
Some early manuscripts containing the text of this chapter are:

- Codex Sinaiticus (AD 330–360)
- Codex Alexandrinus (400–440)
- Codex Ephraemi Rescriptus (c. 450; complete)
- Codex Freerianus (c. 450; extant verses 6–8; 16–17)
- Codex Claromontanus (c. 550)

== The heresy in Ephesus in prophetic perspective (verses 1–9) ==
Paul paints a picture of the false teachers as 'actual deviants from the norm established by his gospel' who, as a result, endanger the faith of themselves and their followers. A lengthy list of their vices spans verses 2–4. Among the terms listed is Greek: βλασφημοι (blasphēmoi), translated in some places as "blasphemers", but also as "abusive".

=== Verse 5 ===
[People] ... having a form of godliness but denying its power. And from such people turn away!

This verse makes clear that the listed vices "belong to heterodox Christians", given the directive that Timothy and his congregation are to keep away from them.

== The way of following Paul (verses 10–17) ==
In this section Paul instructs Timothy to commit to Paul's teaching, as Timothy already shared many experiences with Paul, and urge him to 'accept the mantle of the Pauline mission'.

=== Verse 16 ===
All Scripture is God-breathed and is useful for teaching, rebuking, correcting and training in righteousness,

"God-breathed" (Greek: θεόπνευστος, theopneustos) can be rendered as "given by inspiration of God". The Syriac version renders it "written by the Spirit", the Ethiopian version: "by the Spirit of God". For "all Scripture" (πᾶσα γραφὴ, pasa graphē, Towner renders this as "every [text of] Scripture".

This verse is quoted by official Catholic Church teachings affirming that "the books of both the Old and New Testaments in their entirety, with all their parts, are sacred and canonical because[,] written under the inspiration of the Holy Spirit, they have God as their author and have been handed on as such to the Church herself.

=== Verse 17 ===
So that the servant of God may be thoroughly equipped for every good work.

Thoroughness in preparation for the work of God is significantly stressed and applicable for every Christian worker, although the term the man of God, which appears in many English translations of this verse, can be narrowly interpreted as applying to Christian teachers.

== See also ==
- Antioch
- Iconium
- Jambres
- Jesus Christ
- Lystra
- Moses
- Related Bible parts: Matthew 24, Romans 5, 1 Timothy 4

== Sources ==
- Guthrie, Donald (1994). "The Pastoral Letters". In Carson, D. A.; France, R. T.; Motyer, J. A.; Wenham, G. J. (eds.). New Bible Commentary: 21st Century Edition (4, illustrated, reprint, revised ed.). Inter-Varsity Press. pp. 1292–1315. ISBN 978-0-85110-648-9.
- Drury, Clare (2007). "73. The Pastoral Epistles". In Barton, John; Muddiman, John (eds.). The Oxford Bible Commentary (first (paperback) ed.). Oxford University Press. pp. 1220–1233. ISBN 978-0-19-927718-6.
- Towner, Philip H. (2006). Bruce, Frederick Fyvie (ed.). The Letters to Timothy and Titus. The New International Commentary on the New Testament. Wm. B. Eerdmans Publishing. ISBN 978-0-8028-2513-1.
