= Alexander (New Testament person) =

The name "Alexander" in the New Testament refers to a number of different people:

- The son of Simon of Cyrene, and brother of Rufus (Mark 15:21)
- A member of the high priestly family (Acts 4:6)
- Alexander (Ephesian) (1 Timothy 1:20; could also be the Alexander of Acts 19:33)
- Alexander the Coppersmith (2 Timothy 4:14)
