= Philetus =

Philetus may refer to:

- Philetus (biblical figure), Christian false teacher mentioned by Paul in 2 Timothy 2:15—18.
- Philetus (martyr) (d.121) Roman senator and Christian martyr
- Philetus, assistant of Hermogenes the magician in The Golden Legend

People with the first name Philetus include

- Philetus Norris (1821-1885), superintendent of Yellowstone National Park
- Philetus Sawyer (1816-1900), Wisconsin Republican politician
- Philetus Swift (1763-1828), New York politician
