= Thomas Ellwood =

English poet and Quaker theologian

Thomas Ellwood (October 1639 – 1 March 1714) was an English religious writer. He is remembered for his relationship with poet John Milton, and some of his writing has proved durable as well.

== Life ==
Ellwood was born in the village of Crowell, Oxfordshire, the son of a rural squire, Walter Ellwood, by his wife, Elizabeth Potman. From 1642 to 1646 the family lived in London. He was educated at Lord Williams's School in Thame.

Ellwood became a Quaker after visiting Isaac Penington and his family at Chalfont St. Peter in Buckinghamshire. Penington's wife, Mary, widow of Sir William Springett, had known the Ellwoods while they lived in London. On a second visit in December 1659, when Thomas attended a Quaker meeting at a neighbouring farmhouse and made the acquaintance of Edward Burrough and James Nayler. Burrough's preaching impressed Ellwood, and after attending a second meeting at High Wycombe he joined the new sect and adopted their modes of dress and speech. His father resented his son's conversion, thrashed him for wearing his hat in his presence, and kept him confined in the house through the winter of 1660. Neither blows nor persuasion could induce Ellwood to renounce his new sentiments, to take off his hat before his parents, or to address them with other pronouns than "thou" and "thee." At Easter, the Peningtons managed to move him to Chalfont St. Peter, where he stayed till Whitsuntide. He attended meetings with great assiduity.

In 1660 Ellwood was divinely inspired, according to his own account, to write and print an attack on the established clergy entitled An Alarm to the Priests. He later visited London and met George Fox the younger. About November 1660 Ellwood invited a Quaker from Oxford named Thomas Loe to attend a meeting at Crowell. Loe was at the time in prison in Oxford Castle, and Ellwood's letter fell into the hands of Lord Falkland, lord-lieutenant of the county. A party of horse was sent to arrest him: he was taken before two justices of the peace at Weston, refused to take the oaths of allegiance and supremacy, and was imprisoned for some months at Oxford in the house of the city marshal, a linendraper in High Street named Galloway. His father secured his release and tried to keep him from Quaker meetings.

In April 1661 the elder Ellwood and his two daughters left Crowell to live in London; Thomas Ellwood then sold the beasts on the Crowell farm at his father's directions and dismissed the servants. For a time he lived in complete solitude. He often visited Aylesbury gaol, where many of his Quaker friends were in prison. At a Quaker meeting held at Penington's house he was, for a second time, arrested, but was soon discharged. For no apparent reason he was immediately afterwards arrested as a rogue and vagabond by the watch at Beaconsfield while walking home from Chalfont St. Peters, but was released after one night's detention.

Early in 1662 Ellwood was attacked by smallpox, and on his recovery went to London to study. His friend Penington consulted Dr. Paget, who arranged that he should read with the poet John Milton, now completely blind. Ellwood lodged in Aldersgate nearby Milton's house, and read in Latin to him. After six-week Ellwood fell ill, went to Wycombe to recuperate, and returned in October 1662. That month he was arrested again, and was committed to Newgate Prison in December. His plea of illegal detention was over-ruled. He was moved to Bridewell, and released in January. Then till 1669 Ellwood resided with the Peningtons as Latin tutor to their young children, and he managed their estates in Kent and Sussex. He agreed to the sale of Crowell by his father, and acquired some ready money.

In June 1665 Ellwood hired a cottage for Milton at Chalfont St. Giles, where the poet lived during the Great Plague of London. On 1 July he was arrested while attending a funeral at Amersham, and spent a month in Aylesbury gaol. On his discharge he paid Milton a visit, and was lent the manuscript of Paradise Lost; Ellwood asked "what hast thou to say of Paradise Found"? When Ellwood called on Milton in London in the autumn, he was shown Paradise Regained. Pennington was in prison at Aylesbury for nine months during 1665 and 1666; his household was broken up, and Ellwood stayed with his pupils at Aylesbury, Bristol, and Amersham. From 13 March 1685-6 till 25 June Ellwood was himself imprisoned once again at Wycombe for attending a meeting at Hedgerley, Buckinghamshire.

Ellwood married Mary Ellis in 1669 and lived in Coleshill, Hertfordshire. His close friendship with William Penn and George Fox made him an influential figure in the Quaker movement: Penn married his friend Gulielma Pennington. In 1668 he lent assistance to George Fox in his attempt to crush John Perrot, leader of a body of Quaker dissenters who insisted on wearing their hats during worship, and he travelled with Fox through the west of England on an organising expedition. In 1670 he was present at the debate at High Wycombe between Jeremy Ives, a Baptist, and William Penn. When the Conventicle Act became law in July 1670, and the Quakers were at the mercy of corrupt informers, Ellwood against two named Aris and Lacy for perjury. In 1674 he was engaged in a controversy with Thomas Hicks, a Baptist, who had written against Quakerism. He also wrote much against tithes from 1678 onwards, and attacked William Rogers, who in 1682 ignored the authority of Penn and Fox, and denied their right to control the Quaker community.

Ellwood's account of his own life stopped in July 1683, when he was protesting against the injustice of treating Quaker meetings as riotous assemblies. He had just been threatened with prosecution for seditious libel because he had warned the constables to beware of informers. This was in the wake of the Rye House Plot, and his work A Caution to Constables had brought attention to him.

His father died about 1684 at Holton, and Ellwood was charged by his enemies with absenting himself from his funeral. But he behaved dutifully, according to his own account, to the last. He lived in retirement at Amersham for the greater part of his remaining years, writing constantly against internal divisions in the Quaker ranks, and denouncing in 1684 the heresy of George Keith. In 1690 he edited the journal of his friend, George Fox, and was long engaged on a history of the Old Testament. In 1707 and 1708 distraints were levied on him for the non-payment of tithes. His wife died in April 1708, and he himself died 1 March 1714, at his house, Hunger Hill, Amersham. Both were buried in the Friends' burying-place at New Jordan, Chalfont St. Giles.

== Works ==
Ellwood was the author of several polemical works in defence of the Quaker position, of which Forgery no Christianity (1674), The Foundation of Tithes Shaken (1678) and two tracts attacking Thomas Hicks deserve mention. His Sacred Histories of the Old and New Testaments appeared in 1705 and 1709. He also published some volumes of poems, among them his best-known work, Davideis (1712), a poem in five books about the life of King David. His autobiography, The History of the Life of Thomas Ellwood: written by his own hand, published posthumously, is a valuable historical document. It has been in print almost continuously since 1714.
