= Epistle to Timothy =

There are two Epistles to Timothy in the New Testament:

- First Epistle to Timothy
- Second Epistle to Timothy
