= Hymenaeus =

Hymenaeus may refer to:

- Hymen (god), also known as Hymenaios, a deity in Greek mythology
- Hymenaeus (biblical figure), a heretical teacher in Ephesus
- Grady Louis McMurtry, also known as Hymenaeus Alpha
- William Breeze (Hymenaeus Beta), his successor in the Caliphate Ordo Templi Orientis
