= Thomas Newbery =

English author

- Occupation: Author

Thomas Newbery (fl. 1563) was an English author.

== Biography ==
Newbery was the author of "Dives Pragmaticus: a Booke in Englyssh Metre of the great Marchaunt Man called Dives Pragmaticus, very preaty for Children to rede: whereby they may the better and more readyer rede and wryte wares and implements in this World contayned. . . . “When thou sellest aught unto thy neighbour or byest anything of him, deceave not nor oppresse him.” Deut. 23, Leviticus 19. Imprinted at London in Aldersgate St., by Alexander Lacy, dwellyng beside the Wall, the xxv of April 1563." A unique copy is in the Althorp Library, now at Manchester, and it was privately reprinted in Henry Huth's "Fugitive Tracts," 1875. It is a quarto of eight pages, especially compiled for children. It is entirely in verse, and the preface, to "all occupations now under the sunne," calls upon the men of all trades by name to come and buy of the wares of Dives Pragmaticus, to the end that the children may learn to read and write their designations, as well as their wares and implements. The names of the trades and of the wares offered are curious and interesting, shedding some side-lights on the manners and customs of the period.

The author may possibly be identical with a London publisher of the same name who issued in 1580 "A Briefe Homily … made to be used throughout the Diocese of Lincoln."

Another Thomas Newbery (fl. 1656), a printer, published in 1656, at his shop, at the Three Lions, near the Exchange, "Rules for the Government of the Tongue," by Edward Reyner.
