= Zenas the Lawyer =

Early Christian mentioned in the New Testament

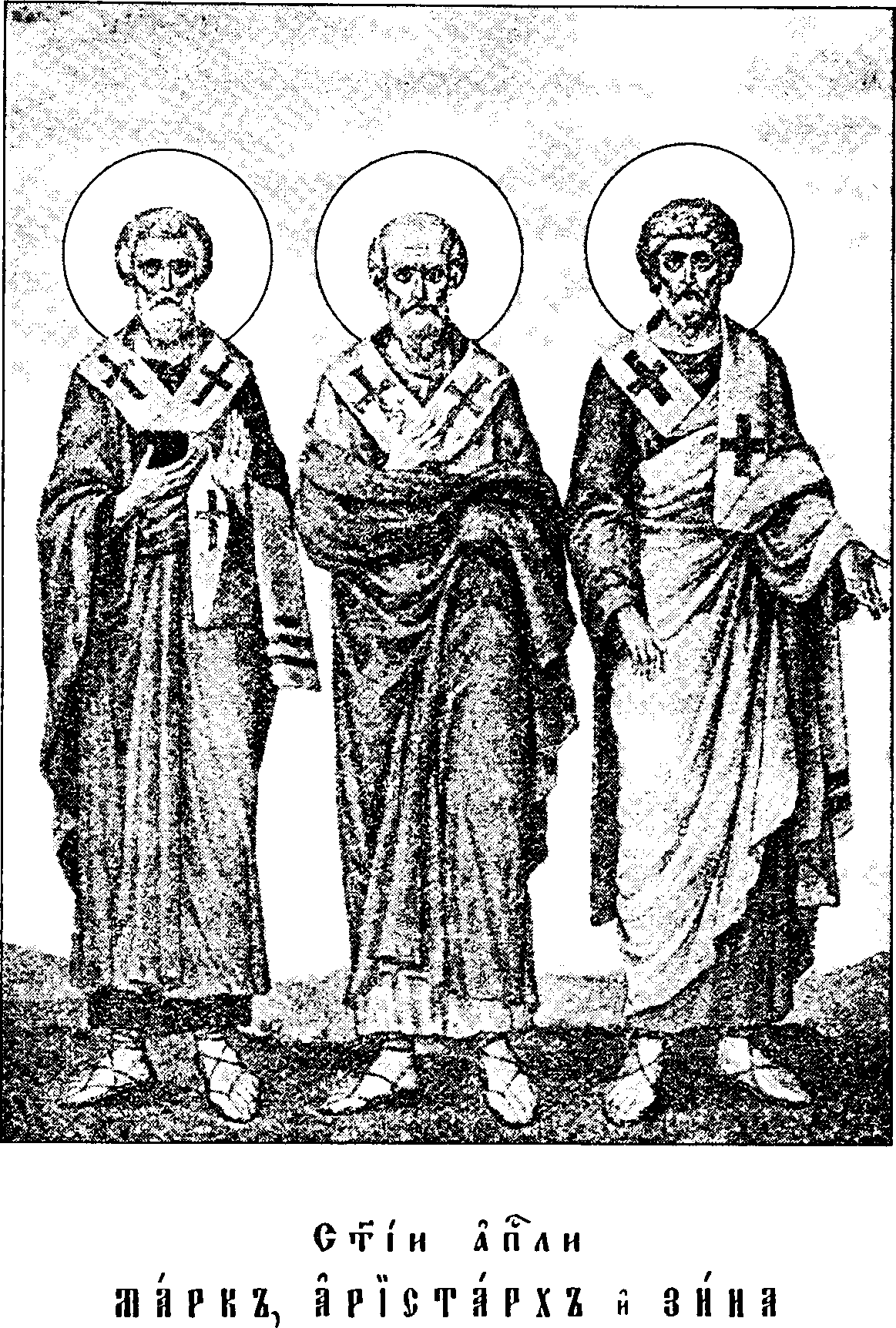

Zenas the Lawyer (Ancient Greek: Ζηνᾶς) was a first-century Christian mentioned in Paul the Apostle's Epistle to Titus in the New Testament. In Titus 3:13, Paul writes: "Bring Zenas the lawyer and Apollos on their journey diligently, that nothing be wanting unto them" (KJV). His name is a shortened form of "Zenodoros", meaning "gift of Zeus". By tradition, he is often counted as one of the unnamed seventy disciples sent out by Jesus into the villages of Galilee, as mentioned in Luke 10:1–24.

It has been suggested that Zenas was the inaugural bishop of Lydda and the author of the Acts of Titus. Some have suggested that Zenas is also mentioned in the apocryphal Acts of Paul under the name of Zenon, the son of Onesiphorus.

Zenas the Lawyer is venerated as a saint by the Roman Catholic Church (April 14), Eastern Orthodox Church (September 27) (by Julian Calendar, January 4).

== Occupation ==
There has been debate among scholars about the description of Zenas as a "lawyer", as the Greek word used can refer to an expert in either Jewish or Roman law. It is possible that Paul only mentions his profession in order to avoid confusion with another "Zenas".

Proponents of the view that Zenas was an expert in Jewish law have pointed to a number of facts, including other New Testament uses of the word, his association with Apollos (a Jewish convert to Christianity) and the use of the related word for "Law" (referring to the Law of Moses) earlier in the letter. Others have argued against this view by pointing to extra-biblical uses of the word and Paul's attitude to experts in the Law in his other letters.
