= Faithful saying =

The faithful sayings (translated as trustworthy saying in the NIV) are sayings in the pastoral epistles of the New Testament. There are five sayings with this label, and the Greek phrase (πιστος ὁ λογος) is the same in all instances, although the KJV uses a different word in 1 Timothy 3:1. George W. Knight III argues that the sayings are "self-conscious creedal/liturgical expressions of the early church" which "either speak in terms of the person and work of Christ or reflect a teaching or saying of Christ," and thus "show the orientation to Christ of the early church."

== The sayings ==
This is a faithful saying, and worthy of all acceptation, that Christ Jesus came into the world to save sinners; of whom I am chief.

— 1 Timothy 1:15, KJV

This is a true saying, if a man desire the office of a bishop, he desireth a good work.

— 1 Timothy 3:1, KJV

For bodily exercise profiteth little: but godliness is profitable unto all things, having promise of the life that now is, and of that which is to come. This is a faithful saying and worthy of all acceptation.

— 1 Timothy 4:8–9, KJV

It is a faithful saying: For if we be dead with him, we shall also live with him: If we suffer, we shall also reign with him: if we deny him, he also will deny us: If we believe not, yet he abideth faithful: he cannot deny himself.

— 2 Timothy 2:11–13, KJV

But after that the kindness and love of God our Saviour toward man appeared, Not by works of righteousness which we have done, but according to his mercy he saved us, by the washing of regeneration, and renewing of the Holy Ghost; Which he shed on us abundantly through Jesus Christ our Saviour; That being justified by his grace, we should be made heirs according to the hope of eternal life. This is a faithful saying, and these things I will that thou affirm constantly, that they which have believed in God might be careful to maintain good works. These things are good and profitable unto men.

— Titus 3:4–8, KJV

== See also ==
- List of Christian creeds
