= Martin Mason (Quaker) =

English Quaker

Martin Mason (fl. 1650–1676) was an early English Quaker, often imprisoned for his beliefs, and a prolific writer of controversial tracts.

== Life ==
He was probably the son of John Mason of St. Swithin's, Lincoln. Mason was well educated and versed in Latin. He joined the Quakers early, and between 1650 and 1671 was continually imprisoned for his opinions. Most of his writings are dated from Lincoln Castle. He was concerned in the schism of John Perrot about wearing the hat during prayer.

Mason was one of the four hundred liberated by the King's patent, 13 September 1672. The absence of any record of his death may imply that he left the society.

== Works ==
He wrote:

- The Proud Pharisee reproved, London, 1655, in answer to a book by Edward Reyner.
- A Checke to the Loftie Linguist, London, 1655, an answer to George Scortrith, minister, of Lincoln.
- The Boasting Baptist dismounted and the Beast disarmed and sorely wounded without any carnal weapon, London, 1656 and Sion's Enemy discovered [1659]; these in answer to Jonathan Johnson of Lincoln.
- A Faithful Warning … to Englands King and his Council that they may wisely improve this little inch of time, &c. [1660].
- Innocency cleared; the Liberties and Privileges of Gods People for Assembling together … calmly expostulated; and their refusal of all oaths in meekness vindicated [1660].
- A Loving Invitation and a Faithful Warning to all People, London [1660], translated into Dutch and German, 1661.
- A Friendly Admonition or Good Counsel to the Roman Catholicks in this Kingdom, 1662.
- (With John Whitehead) An Expostulation with the Bishops in England concerning their Jurisdiction over the People of God called Quakers. This has a poetical postscript, and is dated 5 September 1662. It was reprinted with the addition of the words ‘so called’ after bishops in the title-page, and signed !"J. W." only.
- One Mite more cast into God's Treasury, in some Prison Meditations, or Breathings of an Honest Heart, touching England's Condition now at this day, 1665.
- Love and Good-Will to Sion and her Friends, 1665.

In November 1660 Mason wrote from Lincoln Castle An Address to Charles, King of England, and an Address to both Houses of Parliament. They set forth that all compulsion in religion should be removed. They were printed in broadside.

The Vision of John Perrot, 1682, contains on the back of the title page some in memoriam verses by Mason, dated 27 October 1676. He seems to have taken a broad-minded view of the Perrot controversy, and wrote What matter whether hat be on or off, so long as heart be right? (manuscript letters). A volume of manuscripts, formerly in the possession of a descendant, contained verses and letters addressed to judges and deputy-lieutenants of the county of Lincoln, besides correspondence with Albertus Otto Faber, a German doctor who cured him (see Faber's De Auro Potabili Medicinale, 1677, p. 6).

== Family ==
Mason had a daughter, Abigail, buried among the Quakers at Lincoln, 4 April 1658, and a son, Martin, married at St. Peter at Arches, Lincoln, 29 July 1679, to Frances Rosse, widow, of Lincoln.
