= Hymenaeus (biblical figure) =

Early Christian from Ephesus

Hymenaeus (fl. 50–65, 1 Timothy 1:20, 2 Timothy 2:17) was an early Christian from Ephesus, an opponent of the apostle Paul, who associates him with Alexander and Philetus.

== Biblical accounts ==
In 1 Timothy 1:20, Hymenaeus is included in the "some" who had put away faith and a good conscience and who had made shipwreck concerning faith. The apostle adds that he had delivered Hymenaeus and Alexander to Satan, that they might learn not to blaspheme. Some have viewed this statement as similar to 1 Corinthians 5:5, where Paul commands the church to expel a member engaging in sexual immorality, in the hopes that his spirit would eventually be saved as a result of this discipline.

== Denial of the resurrection ==
Paul mentions Hymenaeus and Philetus as a cautionary example of those who "have left the path of truth, claiming that the resurrection of the dead has already occurred; in this way, they have turned some people away from the faith." He warns that worthless and foolish talk "spreads like cancer" (2 Timothy 2:17 NLT) and ultimately leads to godless behavior.

== Incipient Gnosticism ==
It is impossible to define exactly the full nature of this heresy, but from what Paul says regarding it, Hymenaeus and Philetus may have believed in an early form of the Christian heresy of Gnosticism. This awakening from Sin had taken place with themselves, so the Gnostics held, and therefore there could be no day in the future when the dead shall hear the voice of the Son of God and shall come forth from the grave (John 5:28).

This spiritualizing of the resurrection sprang from the idea of the necessarily evil nature of all material substance. This idea immediately led to the conclusion of the essentially evil nature of the human body, and that if man is to rise to his true nature, he must rid himself of the thraldom, not of sin, but of the body. This contempt for the body led to the denial of the resurrection in its literal sense; and all that Christ had taught on the subject was explained only, in an allegorical sense, of the resurrection of the soul from sin.

== Delivered unto Satan ==
The way in which the apostle dealt with these teachers, Hymenaeus and his companions, was not merely in the renewed assertion of the truth which they denied, but also by passing sentence upon these teachers—"whom I delivered unto Satan, that they might be taught not to blaspheme." In regard to the meaning of this sentence much difficulty of interpretation exists. Some understand it to mean simple excommunication from the church. Others take it to signify the infliction of some bodily suffering or disease.

== Bibliography ==
Attribution

- This entry incorporates text from the public domain International Standard Bible Encyclopedia, originally published in 1915.
