= Edward Reyner =

English nonconforming clergyman and devotional writer

Edward Reyner (Rayner) (1600–c.1668) was an English nonconforming clergyman, known as a devotional writer.

== Life ==
He was born in the parish of Morley, near Leeds. He attended the monthly religious exercises at Leeds, Pudsey, and Halifax, and heard numerous sermons. After graduating B.A. in 1620 from St. John's College, Cambridge (M.A. 1624), he taught in a school at Aserby, Lincolnshire, and afterwards took charge of the Countess of Warwick's school at Market Rasen. At the close of four years Lady Warwick gave him a lectureship which she supported at Welton. From there he was invited to Lincoln, where he remained nearly forty years. He was appointed lecturer at St. Benedict's on 13 August 1626, and on 26 February 1627 was presented by the king to the rectory of St. Peter at Arches, to which the vicarage of St. Benedict's was attached.

Despite Reyner's refusal to conform to all the ceremonies, his eloquence drew to his church the chancellor of the cathedral and other officials. He preached during the visitations of Bishop John Williams, and was collated to the prebend of St. Botolph's at Lincoln on 10 September 1635. In 1639 he declined the offer of the pastorate of the English congregation at Arnhem, the Netherlands. In the same year orders were sent him from the ecclesiastical court to certify quarterly, or as often as required, of his conformity to the common prayer.

Reyner left Lincoln during the royalist occupation of the First English Civil War. For a time he preached at Yarmouth on Sundays. But he soon settled at Norwich, and gave two week-day lectures at St. Andrew's Church in that city (1643–1645). He returned to Lincoln on 29 October 1645 on receipt of a call under the seal of the corporation, and of an order from the Westminster Assembly. He preached regularly at St. Peter's in the morning, and at the cathedral in the afternoon, adopting the congregationalist system. His sermons were chiefly directed against antinomianism and anabaptism. During the siege of Newark Reyner preached to the parliamentary army on the fast day appointed for 27 March 1646, and the sermon was printed. He did not take the 'engagement' but agreed to the Savoy confession of faith.

He was ejected from his benefice in 1662, but appears to have remained at Lincoln. By his wife Elizabeth he had two sons: John (born 1624), a fellow of Emmanuel College, Cambridge, whence he was ejected at the Restoration, and Joseph.

== Works ==
Reyner wrote:

- 'Precepts for Christian Practice,' with a preface by Edmund Calamy, and a note by Dr. Thomas Manton, London, 8th edit. 1655; 11th edit. 1658; answered by Martin Mason in 'The Proud Pharisee reproved,' 1655.
- 'Rules for the Government of the Tongue: together with Directions in six Particular Cases,' London.
- 'Considerations concerning Marriage, with a Resolution of this Case of Conscience, whether a Man may lawfully marry his Wife's Sister,' London, 1657, reprinted with 'Precepts,' 11th edit. London, 1657: the original manuscript, sent to London to the author's friend, Simeon Ashe, was lost in May 1657; the work was rewritten a month or two later.
- 'A Treatise of the Necessity of Humane Learning for a Gospel-preacher, shewing . . . the benefit of learning in all ages,' London, 1663.
- 'The Being and Wellbeing of a Christian. In three Treatises: setting forth the Properties of the Righteous, the Excellency of Grace, the Nature and Sweetness of Fellowship with Christ,' London, 1669, published posthumously. The last two were edited with introduction by his son John.
