= Demas =

Biblical character

Demas (Greek: Δημᾶς, romanized: Dēmas; probably a short form of Demetrios) was a man mentioned by the Apostle Paul in the New Testament of the Bible, and appears to have been involved for a time in his ministry.

Demas is mentioned in three of the Pauline epistles:

- In Philemon (dated to c. AD 57–62) he is mentioned as a "fellow worker".
- In Colossians (AD 62) he is mentioned along with Luke (the physician and writer of the Luke–Acts).^{[Colossians 4:14]}
- In Second Timothy, a letter traditionally ascribed to Paul near the end of his life, where it is mentioned that "...for Demas, because he loved this world, he has deserted me and has gone to Thessalonica."^{[2 Timothy 4:10a]} This has led to one commentator to describe Demas as 'Paul's Judas'.

Demas is also mentioned in the non-canonical Acts of Paul and Thecla, where he is described as holding views similar to the author of Second Peter. Based on this, Dale Martin speculates that whichever one of the Acts of Paul and Thecla and the Pastoral Epistles (including Second Timothy) was written later may have been arguing against the other.

== Fictional references ==
In The Pilgrim's Progress, John Bunyan writes of Demas, a deceiver, who beckons to pilgrims at the Hill Lucre, urging them to join in the supposed silver mining being carried out there; he is described as a "fellow pilgrim", just as Demas is described by Paul as a "fellow worker," but has a love for earthly treasures which caused him to desert the path and could lead to his death, just as Demas's love for the world caused him to stop following God and potentially to lose his salvation.

In Lora Johnson's 2007 novel, "The Demas Revelation," Demas plays a pivotal role in the plot of the story and lends his name to the title.

In Jane Eyre, St. John notes that Jane is free of "the vice of Demas" when trying to convince her to join him as a missionary in India.
