= Philetus (biblical figure) =

Early Christian mentioned in the Bible

Philetus (Greek: Φίλητος; fl. 50–65) was an early Christian mentioned by Paul, who warns Timothy against him as well as against his associate in error, Hymenaeus.

== False teaching ==
The apostle speaks of Hymenaeus and Philetus as instances of men who were doing most serious injury to the church by their teaching, and by what that teaching resulted in, both in faith and morals. The specific error of these men was that they denied that there would be any bodily resurrection. They treated all Scriptural references to such a state as figurative or metaphorical. They spiritualized it absolutely, and held that the resurrection was a thing of the past. No resurrection was possible, so they taught, except from ignorance to knowledge, from sin to righteousness. There would be no day when the dead would hear the voice of Christ and come forth out of the grave. The Christian, knowing that Christ was raised from the dead, looked forward to the day when his body should be raised in the likeness of Christ's resurrection. But this faith was utterly denied by the teaching of Hymeneus and Philetus.

This teaching of theirs, Paul tells us, had overthrown the faith of some. It would also overthrow Christian faith altogether, for if the dead are not raised, neither is Christ risen from the dead, and "ye are yet in your sins"

The denial of the resurrection of the body, whether of mankind generally or of Christ, is the overthrow of the faith. It leaves nothing to cling to, no living Christ, who saves and leads and comforts His people. The apostle proceeds to say that teaching of this kind "eats as doth a gangrene," and that it increases unto more ungodliness. As a canker or gangrene eats away the flesh, so does such teaching eat away Christian faith. Paul is careful to say, more than once, that the teaching which denies that there will be a resurrection of the dead leads inevitably to "ungodliness" and to "iniquity."

Hymenaeus and Philetus may have believed in a nascent form of the Christian heresy of Gnosticism.

== Sources ==
- This entry incorporates text from the public domain International Standard Bible Encyclopedia, originally published in 1915.
