= Alexander (Ephesian) =

Early Christian (1st c.)

Alexander (Greek: Άλέξανδρος; fl. 50–65) was a Christian teacher in Ephesus. Alexander and Hymenaeus were proponents of antinomianism, a rejection of Christian morality.

Alexander was an opponent of the Apostle Paul.
