= Papyrus 32 =

II century manuscript

Papyrus 𝔓^{32}
- New Testament manuscript
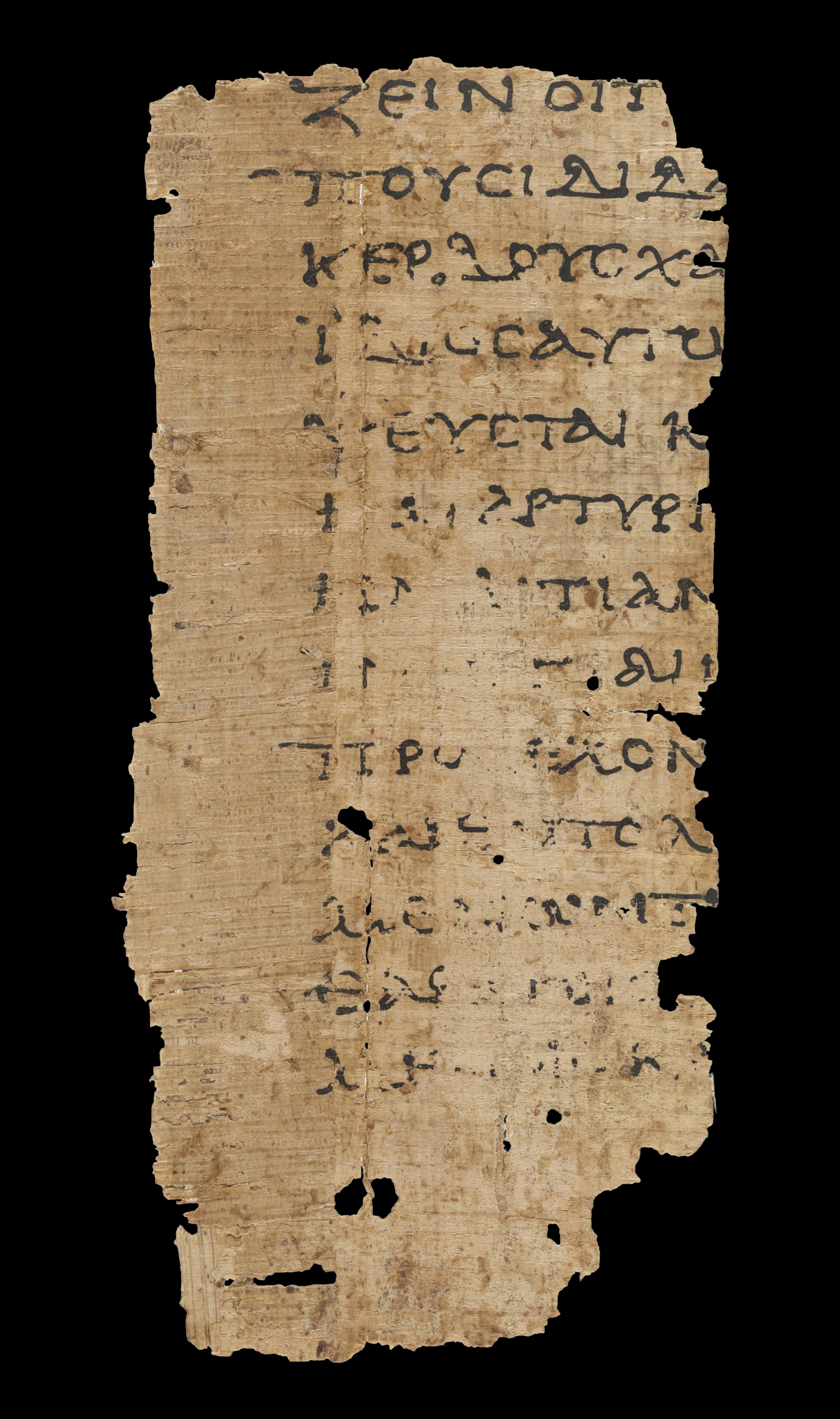
- Recto Titus 1:11-15
- Name: Papyrus Rylands 5
- Text: Titus 1; 2 †
- Date: c. ~200 or 100-300
- Script: Greek
- Found: Egypt
- Now at: John Rylands University Library
- Cite: A. S. Hunt, Catalogue of the Greek Papyri in the John Rylands Library I, Literatury Texts (Manchester 1911), pp. 10-11
- Size: 10.6 x 4.9 cm
- Type: Alexandrian text-type
- Category: I

Papyrus 32 (in the Gregory-Aland numbering), designated by 𝔓^{32}, is an early copy of a partial text of the New Testament in Greek. A papyrus manuscript of the Epistle to Titus, it contains only Titus 1:11-15; 2:3-8. On the basis of paleography, the manuscript has been assigned a date around A.D. 200.

== Description ==
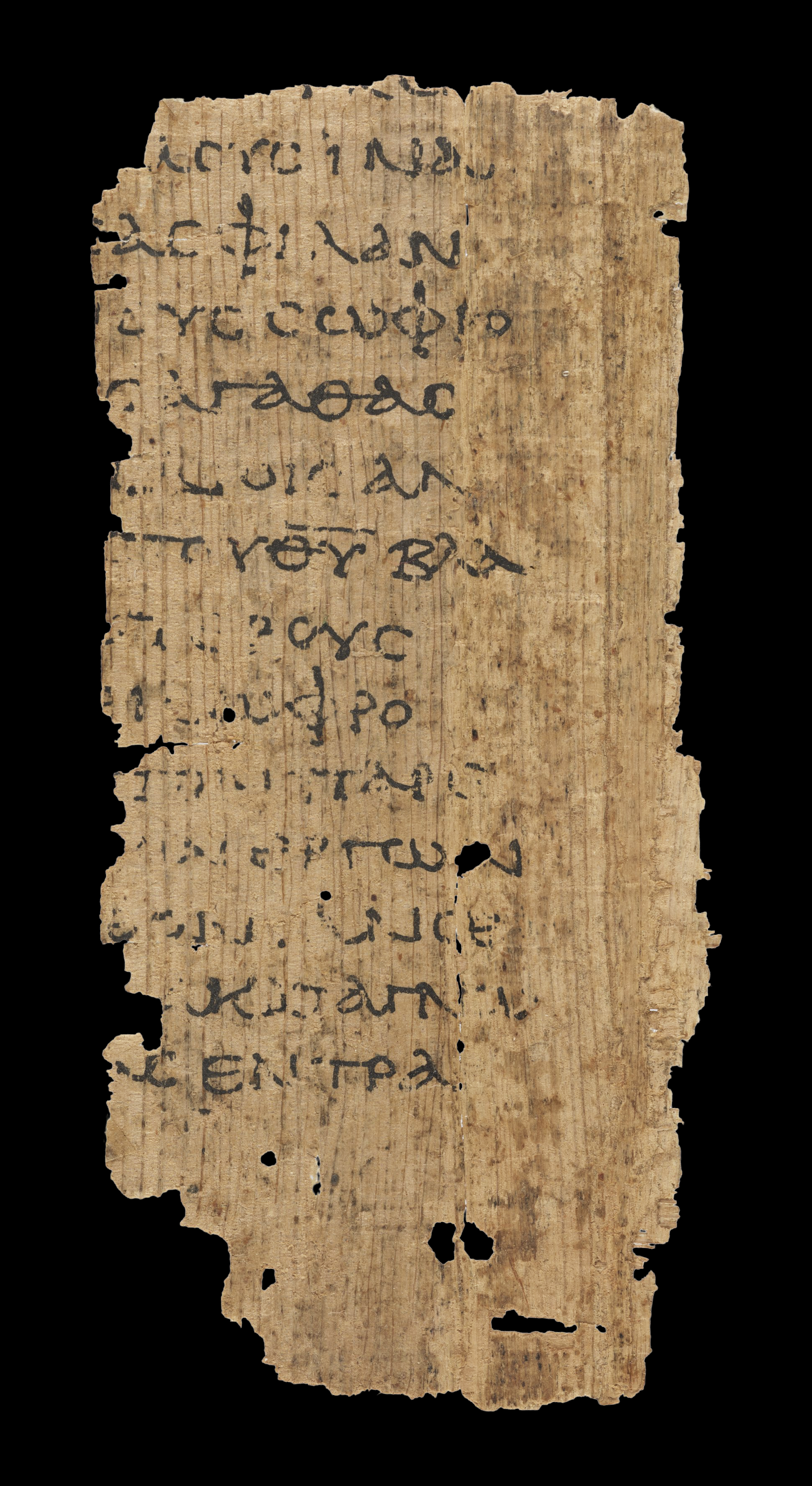
Verso Titus 2:3-8

It is written in round and rather large letters. A slight tendency towards division of words can be observed. The nomina sacra are abbreviated.

The Greek text of this codex, with the exception of one singular reading, agrees with the common readings of the Alexandrian text-type and Byzantine text-type. Aland described it as "at least normal text", placing it in Category I. This manuscript shows agreement with 01, F, and G wherever they read with the majority of manuscripts, but does not receive any support from them in the placing of παρεχομενοσ after rather than before τυπον in v. 7.

It is currently housed with the Rylands Papyri at the John Rylands University Library (Gr. P. 5) in Manchester.

== Greek text ==
The papyrus is written on both sides. The characters that are in bold style are the ones that can be seen in 𝔓^{32}. It shows agreement with all the standard edited texts of Titus 1-2 except toward the end of Titus 2:7, where it appears to read αφθονιαν (generosity) instead of αφθοριαν (the Alexandrian reading of 01 02 04) or αδιαφθοριαν (the reading of most other manuscripts of Titus 2), both meaning "incorruption."

Epistle to Titus 1:11-15 (recto)

EΠIΣTOMI-

ZEIN OITINEΣ OΛOYΣ OIKOYΣ ANATPE-
ΠOYΣI ΔIΔAΣKONTEΣ A MH ΔEI AIΣXPOY
KEPΔOYΣ XAPIN EIΠEN TIΣ EΞ AYTΩN
IΔIOΣ AYTΩN ΠPOΦHTHΣ KPHTEΣ AEI
ΨEYΣTAI KAKA ΘHPIA ΓAΣTEPEΣ APΓAI
H MAPTYPIA AYTH EΣTIN AΛHΘHΣ ΔI
HN AITIAN EΛENXE AYTOYΣ AΠOTOMΩΣ
INA YΓIAINΩΣIN EN TH ΠIΣTEI MH
ΠPOΣEXONTEΣ IOYΔAIKOIΣ MYΘOIΣ
KAI ENTOΛAIΣ ANΘPΩΠΩN APOΣTPEΦO-
MENΩN THN AΛEΘEIAN ΠANTA KA-
ΘAPA TOIΣ KAΘAPOIΣ TOIΣ ΔE MEMIAM-

MENOIΣ KAI AΠIΣTOIΣ OYΔEN KAΘAPON

epistomi-

zein oitines olous oikous anatre-
pousin didaskontes a mē dei aischrou
kerdous charin eipen tis ex autōn
idios autōn prophētēs krētes aei
pseustai kaka thēria gasteres argai
ē marturia autē estin alēthēs di
ēn aitian elenche autous apotomōs
ina ugiainōsin en tē pistei mē
prosechontes ioudaikois muthois
kai entolais anthrōpōn apostrepho-
menōn tēn alētheian panta ka-
thara tois katharois tois de memiam-

menois kai apistois ouden katharon

...

to muzzle, because whole families they are upsetting,
teaching what they must not, for ugly
gain's sake. Said one of themselves,
even one of their own prophets, "Cretans are always
liars, evil beasts, lazy gluttons."
The testimony of this is true. Because of
this reason, reprove them severely,
so that they may be sound in the faith; Not
giving heed to Jewish myths,
and commandments of men, who turn
away from the truth. All things are
pure unto the pure: but unto them who are

both defiled and unbelieving, nothing is pure.

Epistle to Titus 2:3-8 (verso)

ΔIABO-

ΛOYΣ MHΔE OINΩ ΠOΛΛΩ ΔEΔOYΛΩ-
MENAΣ KAΛOΔIΔΣKAΛOYΣ INA
ΣΩΦPONIZΩΣIN TAΣ NEAΣ ΦIΛAN-
ΔPOYΣ EINAI ΦIΛOTEKNOYΣ ΣΩΦPO-
NAΣ AΓNAΣ OIKOYPΓOYΣ AΓAΘAΣ
YΠOTAΣΣOMENAΣ TOYΣ IΔIOIΣ AN-
ΔPAΣIN INA MH O ΛOΓOΣ TOY ΘY BΛA-
ΣΦHMHTAI TOYΣ NEΩTEPOYΣ
ΩΣAYTΩΣ ΠAPAKAΛEI ΣΩΦPON-
EIN ΠEPI ΠANTA ΣEAYTON ΠAPE-
XOMENOΣ TYΠON KAΛΩN EPΓΩN
EN TH ΔIΔAΣKAΛIA AΦΘONIAN ΣE-
MNOTHTA ΛOΓON YΓIH AKATAΓNΩ-
ΣTON INA O EΞ ENANTIAΣ ENTPA-

ΠH

diabo-

lous mēde oinō pollō dedoulō-
menas kalodidaskalous ina
sōphronizōsin tas neas philan-
drous einai philoteknous sōphro-
nas agnas oikourgous agathas
upotassomenas tois idiois an-
drasin ina mē o logos tou thu bla-
sphēmētai tous neōterous
ōsautōs parakalei sōphron-
ein peri panta seauton pare-
chomenos tupon kalōn ergōn
en tē didaskalia aphthonian se-
mnotēta logon ugiē akatagnō-
ston ina o ex enantias entra-

pē

...

false accusers, not to wine much enslaved,
teachers of the good. So that
they may teach to be sensible the young women, loving their husbands,
loving their children. Sober minded,
pure, busy in the home, kind,
subject to their own husbands.
So that not the word of God may be blasphemed.
The young men,
likewise, urge to be sober minded.
Concerning all things, yourself shew
an example of good works:
in the teaching show generosity, gravity,
soundness of speech beyond reproach;

so that he who opposes you may be ashamed,

== See also ==
- List of New Testament papyri
