= Codex Coislinianus =

Greek manuscript of the Pauline epistles

Uncial 015
- New Testament manuscript
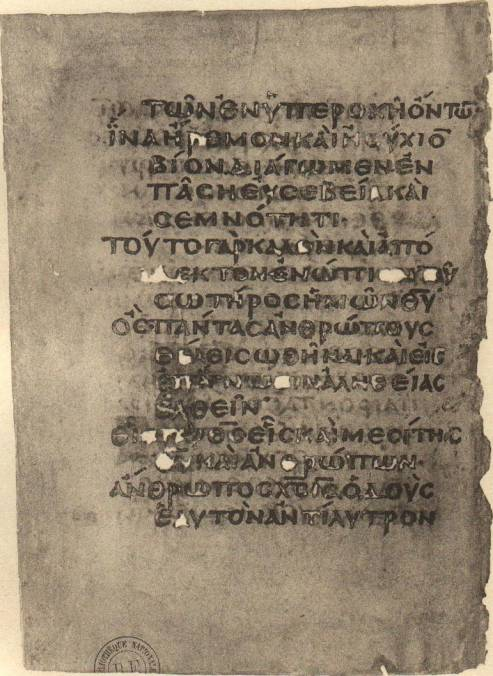
- Page with text of 1 Timothy 2:2-6 (BnF, Cod. Suppl. Gr. 1074; fol. 9v)
- Name: Coislinianus
- Sign: H^{p}
- Text: Pauline epistles
- Date: 6th century
- Script: Greek
- Found: Pierre Séguier
- Now at: Paris, Athos, Petersburg, and others
- Size: 30 cm by 25 cm
- Type: Alexandrian text-type
- Category: III
- Note: marginalia

Codex Coislinianus designated by H^{p} or 015 (in the Gregory-Aland numbering), α 1022 (Soden), was named also as Codex Euthalianus. It is a Greek uncial manuscript of the Pauline epistles, dated palaeographically to the 6th century. The text is written stichometrically. It has marginalia. The codex is known for its subscription at the end of the Epistle to Titus.

The manuscript was divided into several parts and was used as raw material for the production of new volumes. The codex came to the attention of scholars in the 18th century (after edition of Montfaucon). Currently it is housed in several European libraries, in: Paris, Athos, Saint Petersburg, Kiev, Moscow, and Turin.

It is cited in all critical editions of the Greek New Testament.

== Contents ==
The surviving leaves of the codex contain:

1 Cor. 10:22–29, 11:9–16;
2 Cor. 4:2–7, 10:5–11:8, 11:12–12:4;
Gal. 1:1–10, 2:9–17, 4:30–5:5;
Col. 1:26–2:8, 2:20–3:11;
1 Thes. 2:9–13, 4:5–11;
1 Tim. 1:7–2:13, 3:7–13, 6:9–13;
2 Tim. 2:1–9;
Titus 1:1–3, 1:15–2:5, 3:13–15;
Hebr. 1:3–8, 2:11–16, 3:13–18, 4:12–15, 10:1–7, 10:32–38, 12:10–15, 13:24–25.

All these books, belonging to the Pauline epistles, have survived only in fragments. Romans, Philippians, Ephesians, 2 Thes, and Phil have been lost altogether.

== Description ==
The codex originally contained the entire Pauline epistles. The leaves were arranged in quarto (four leaves in quire). Only 41 leaves (30 cm by 25 cm) of the codex have survived. The text is written on parchment in large, square uncials (over 1.5 cm), in one column per page, and 16 lines per page. The breathings (designated by ⊢ and ⊣) and accents were added by a later hand (not to the subscriptions). Accents often were put in wrong places. Iota subscriptum does not occur, there are some errors of itacism (f.e. ΙΟΔΑΙΟΙ instead of ΙΟΥΔΑΙΟΙ). The nomina sacra are written in an abbreviated way (ΘΥ, ΠΡΣ, ΧΥ, ΑΝΟΥΣ), the words at the end of the line are contracted.

The text is divided according to the κεφαλαια (chapters), whose numbers are given at the margin. It contains also tables of the κεφαλαια (tables of contents) before each book.

The value of the codex is indicated by its colophon, on the next to last page, following the Epistle to Titus:

Ἔγραψα καὶ ἐξεθέμην κατὰ δύναμιν στειχηρὸν τόδε τὸ τεῦχος Παύλου τοῦ ἀποστόλου πρὸς ἐγγραμμὸν καὶ εὐκατάλημπτον ἀνάγνωσιν… ἀντεβλήθη δὲ ἡ βίβλος πρὸς τὸ ἐν Καισαρίᾳ ἀντίγραφον τῆς βιβλιοθήκης τοῦ ἀγίου Παμφίλου χειρὶ γεγραμμένον αὑτοῦ.

I, Euthalius, wrote this volume of the Apostle Paul as carefully as possible in stichoi, so that it might be read with intelligence: the book was compared with the copy in the library at Caesarea, written by the hand of Pamphilus the saint.

Almost the same note appears in Codex Sinaiticus in the Book of Ezra and some Armenian manuscripts.

== Text ==
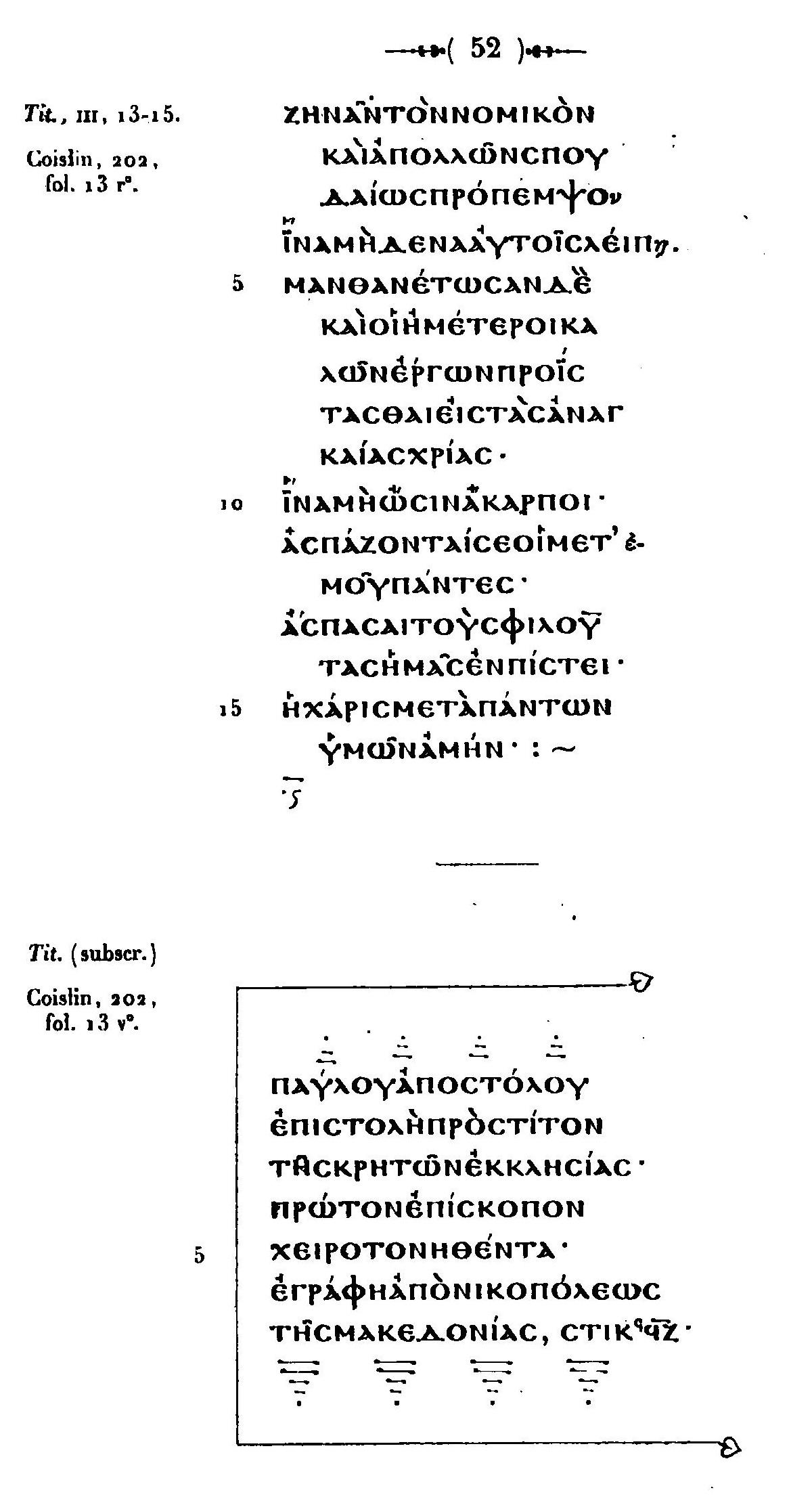
The ending of the Epistle to Titus from facsimile of H. Omont (1889)

The Greek text of this codex is a representative of the Alexandrian text-type, but with a large number of Byzantine readings. According to Lagrange the text is similar to that of Codex Vaticanus. It is one of the witnesses for the Euthalian recension of the Pauline epistles.

According to Eberhard Nestle it is "one of the most valuable manuscripts". Kurt and Barbara Aland gave the following textual profile of it 7^{1}, 0^{1/2}, 12^{2}, 3^{s}. This means the text of the codex agrees with the Byzantine standard text 7 times, it agrees 12 times with the original text against the Byzantine and that it has 3 independent or distinctive readings. Aland considered the quality of the text to suit his Category III. The corrections in the text are almost always representative of the Byzantine textual tradition.

The words before a bracket are the readings of Nestle-Aland, the words after a bracket are the readings of the codex

2 Cor — 10,7 ἀφ' ] ἐφ'
2 Cor — 10,8 τε ] omit
2 Cor — 11,1 ἀφροσύνης ] τη ἀφροσυνη
2 Cor — 11,3 καὶ τἥς ἀγνοτητος ] omit
2 Cor — 11,30 μου ] omit
2 Cor — 12,3 χωρὶς ] εκτος
Gal — 1,3 ἠμων καὶ κυρἰου ] και κυριου ημων
Col — 1,27 ὅ ] ος

== History ==
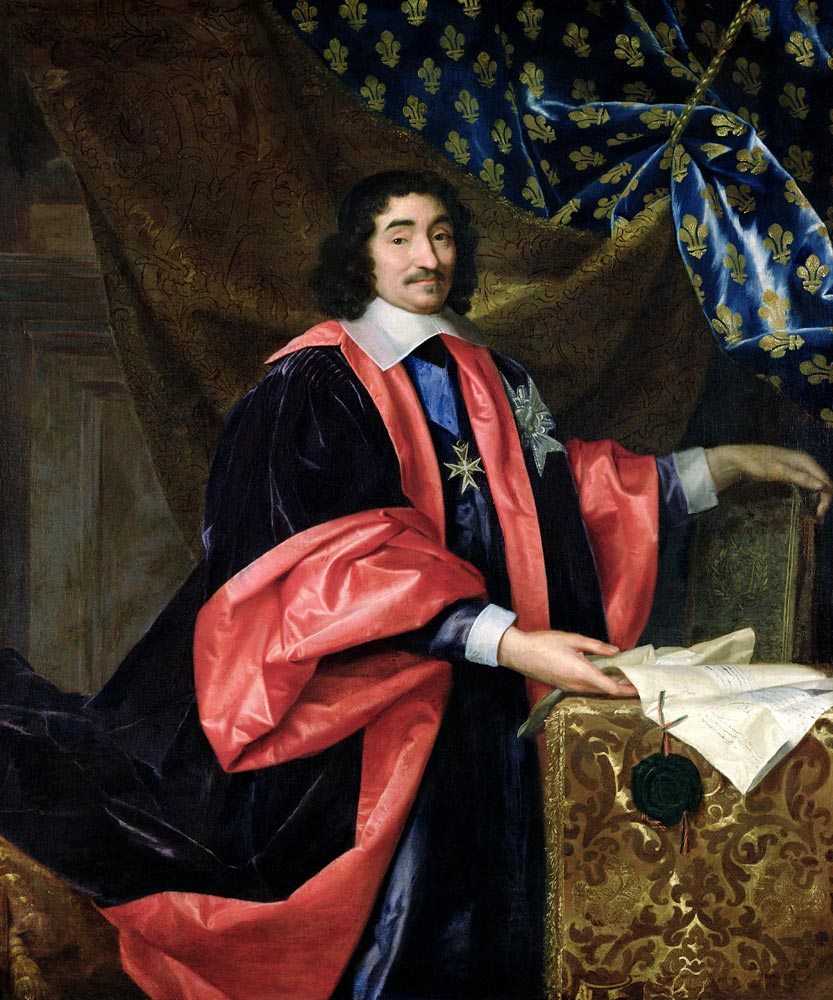
Pierre Seguier painted by Henri Testelin (ca. 1668)

The codex was probably written in the 6th century at the library in Caesarea, later coming into the possession of the monastery of the Great Lavra on Mount Athos, but its value appears to have been overlooked. Leaves of the codex were used as raw material for the production of new volumes. In 975 some leaves, now known as Fragmenta Mosquensia, were used to cover a volume of Gregory Nazianzen at Mount Athos. In the 12th century Fragmenta Taurinensia were used in Nicetas' catenae to the Psalterium, in 1218 another part, now named as Fragmenta Coisliniana, were used with the same purpose.

As a result, leaves of the codex were scattered in several places of the monastery, from where they were collected on several occasions by people from France, Russia, and Italy. The first was Pierre Séguier (1588–1672), who bought 14 leaves which, known later as Fragmenta Coisliniana, and became a part of the Fonds Coislin. They were held in Saint-Germain-des-Prés. In 1715 Bernard de Montfaucon published text of these 14 leaves. He made a few mistakes corrected by Tischendorf (in 1865). Tischendorf observed in Paris additional passage. Montfaucon used the manuscript for his palaeographical studies.

After the fire of St. Germain-des-Prés in 1793 only 12 leaves were found, the other two have been transferred to Saint Petersburg. From 1795 until the present it has been held by the Bibliothèque nationale de France. Fragmenta Mosquensia were brought to Moscow in 1665. They were examined by Matthaei. The last was Porphyrius Uspensky, who took one leaf from the monastery.

The codex is located in eight places, in seven libraries, in six cities in Europe. The bulk of the surviving leaves (22 leaves) are held in two collections in Paris, both in the National Library of France (Suppl. Gr. 1074, and Coislin 202). Eight leaves have not left the Great Lavra. Nine leaves are held in Ukraine or Russia, three each in Kiev (Vernadsky National Library of Ukraine), Saint Petersburg and Moscow (Hist. Mus. 563, and Russian State Library, Gr. 166,1). Finally, two leaves are held in Turin.

Henri Omont published the part of the codex known to him. Another part of the codex housed at Athos was published by Kirsopp Lake, in 1905. It is cited in the printed editions of the Greek New Testament since Tischendorf's edition.

In 2026, academics at the University of Glasgow used multi-spectral imaging to recover the contents of 42 lost pages of the codex.

The manuscript is cited in all critical editions of the Greek New Testament (UBS3, UBS4, NA26, NA27, NA28).

== See also ==
- List of New Testament uncials
- Textual criticism
