= John Perrot (Quaker) =

Irish Quaker sectary

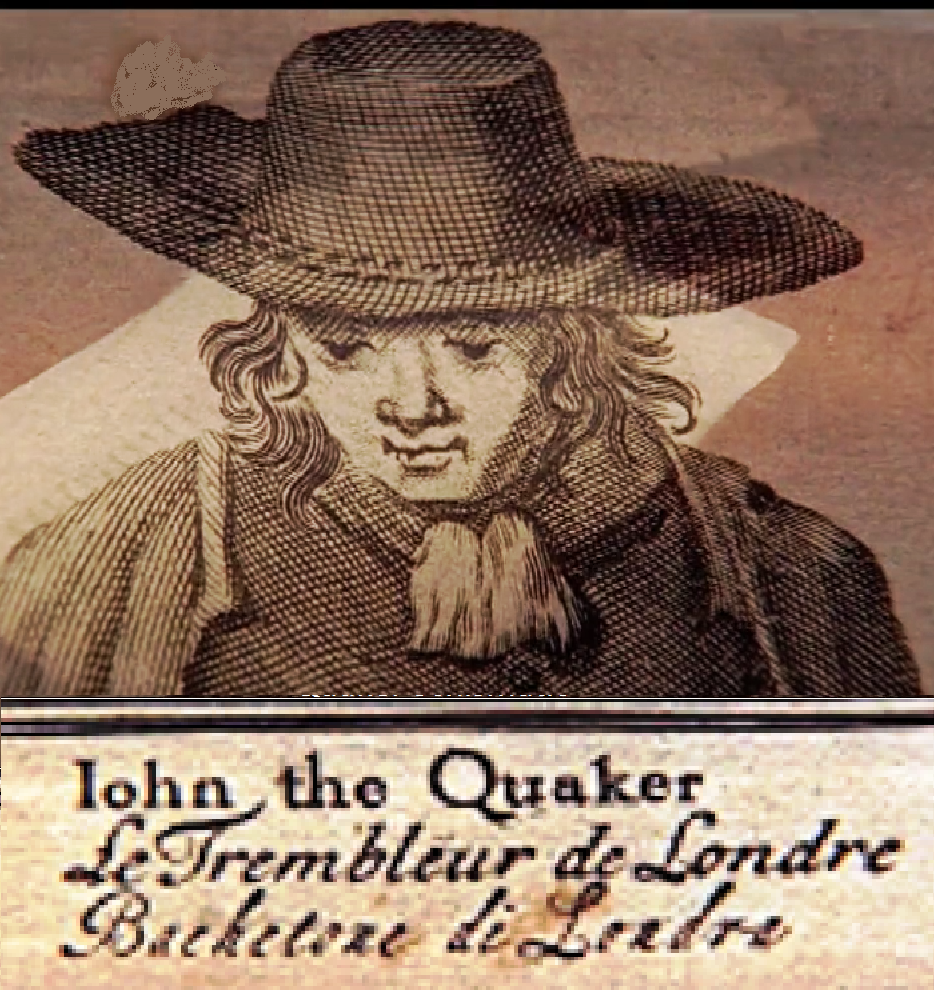
- Died: 1665
- Spouse: Elizabeth

John Perrot (died 1665) was an Irish Quaker sectary known for his missionary work and writings. He is particularly remembered for his visit to Rome in an attempt to convert the Pope.

== Biography ==
Perrot's origins are obscure, although he may have been born in Ireland. He claimed to be an illegitimate son of Sir John Perrot, Lord Deputy of Ireland, but there is no firm evidence of this.

Perrot was a Baptist before becoming a Quaker, living near Waterford with his wife Elizabeth and two children.

Before 1656, Perrot joined the Quakers and began preaching in Limerick. In 1657, he embarked on a mission to Italy with John Love, intending to convert the Pope. They travelled through Lyon, Leghorn, and Athens, where Perrot wrote various religious treatises and letters.

On arriving in Rome, probably in 1658, Perrot and Love commenced preaching against the Romish church, and were arrested. Love died under torture, while Perrot was sent to a madhouse, where he continued to write and send works to England. His imprisonment garnered sympathy, and efforts were made to secure his release, which was achieved in May 1661.

Upon his return to London, Perrot faced criticism from fellow Quakers, including George Fox, for his unconventional beliefs, particularly his opposition to the removal of hats during prayer. Despite losing many supporters, he continued to preach in England and Ireland. In 1662, Perrot and his followers emigrated to Barbados, where he served as a clerk to the magistrates.

Perrot later visited Virginia, influencing local Quakers to abandon traditional practices. He engaged in several trade and agricultural projects in Barbados, though none were successful. Perrot died in Jamaica in 1665, leaving behind a significant body of written work.

== Works ==
His notable works include A Word to the World answering the Darkness thereof, Immanuel the Salvation of Israel, and The Vision of John Perrot. Despite his contributions, his eccentric beliefs and behaviours ultimately led to his marginalisation within the Quaker movement.
