= Philip H. Towner =

American Professor

- Born: 1953 (age 72–73)
- Occupation: Biblical professor
- Title: Dean of the Nida Institute for Biblical Scholarship

Academic background
- Education: University of Aberdeen (Ph.D.)
- Thesis: The Structure of the Theology and Ethics in the Pastoral Epistles (1984)

Academic work
- Discipline: Biblical studies
- Sub-discipline: New Testament studies
- Institutions: Regent College; University of Aberdeen; Nida Institute for Biblical Scholarship
- Notable works: The Letters to Timothy and Titus (NICNT)

Philip H. Towner (born 1953) is dean of the Nida Institute for Biblical Scholarship at the American Bible Society, New York City. He is also research professor of New Testament at Ewangelikalna Szkola Teologiczna in Wrocław, Poland. He has been a faculty member of Regent College (Vancouver, B.C.) and the University of Aberdeen. He is also a translation scholar with particular experience in SE Asia and the Americas.

Towner has served as Director of Translation Services for the United Bible Societies. He was also a founding member of the journal Translation.

== Selected works ==
=== Books ===
- Towner, Philip H. (1981). Christ the Lamb: The relationship Between the Presentation of Christ as Lamb in the Fourth Gospel and Revelation (M.A.). Trinity Evangelical Divinity School.
- ——— (1984). The Structure of the Theology and Ethics in the Pastoral Epistles (Ph.D.). University of Aberdeen.
- ——— (1989). The Goal of Our Instruction: The Structure of Theology and Ethics in the Pastoral Epistles. Journal for the Study of the New Testament Supplement series. Vol. 34. ISBN 978-1-8507-5216-5.
- ———; Marshall, I. Howard (1999). A Critical and Exegetical Commentary on The Pastoral Epistles. International Critical Commentary. Edinburgh: T&T Clark. ISBN 978-0-5670-8661-7.
- ——— (2006). The Letters to Timothy and Titus. New International Commentary on the New Testament. Grand Rapids: Eerdmans. ISBN 978-0-8028-2513-1.
- ——— (2010). 1-2 Timothy & Titus. The IVP New Testament Commentary. Downers Grove: IVP Academic. ISBN 978-0-8308-4014-4.
- ———; Harvey, Robert (2011). 2 Peter and Jude. The IVP New Testament Commentary. Downers Grove: IVP Academic. ISBN 978-0-8308-4018-2.
- ———; Burke, David G.; Kutsko, John F. (2013). The King James Version at 400: Assessing Its Genius as Bible Translation and Its Literary Influence. Biblical Scholarship in North America. Vol. 26. Atlanta: Society of Biblical Literature.

=== Articles & chapters ===
- ——— (2011). "Hearing Voices: The Foreign Voice of Paul under the Stress of Contemporary English Localization". In Laansma, Jon C.; Osborne, Grant R.; Van Neste, Ray (eds.). New Testament Theology in Light of the Church's Mission: essays in honor of I. Howard Marshall. Eugene, OR: Wipf & Stock. ISBN 978-1-6109-7530-8.
