= Epistle to Titus =

Book of the New Testament

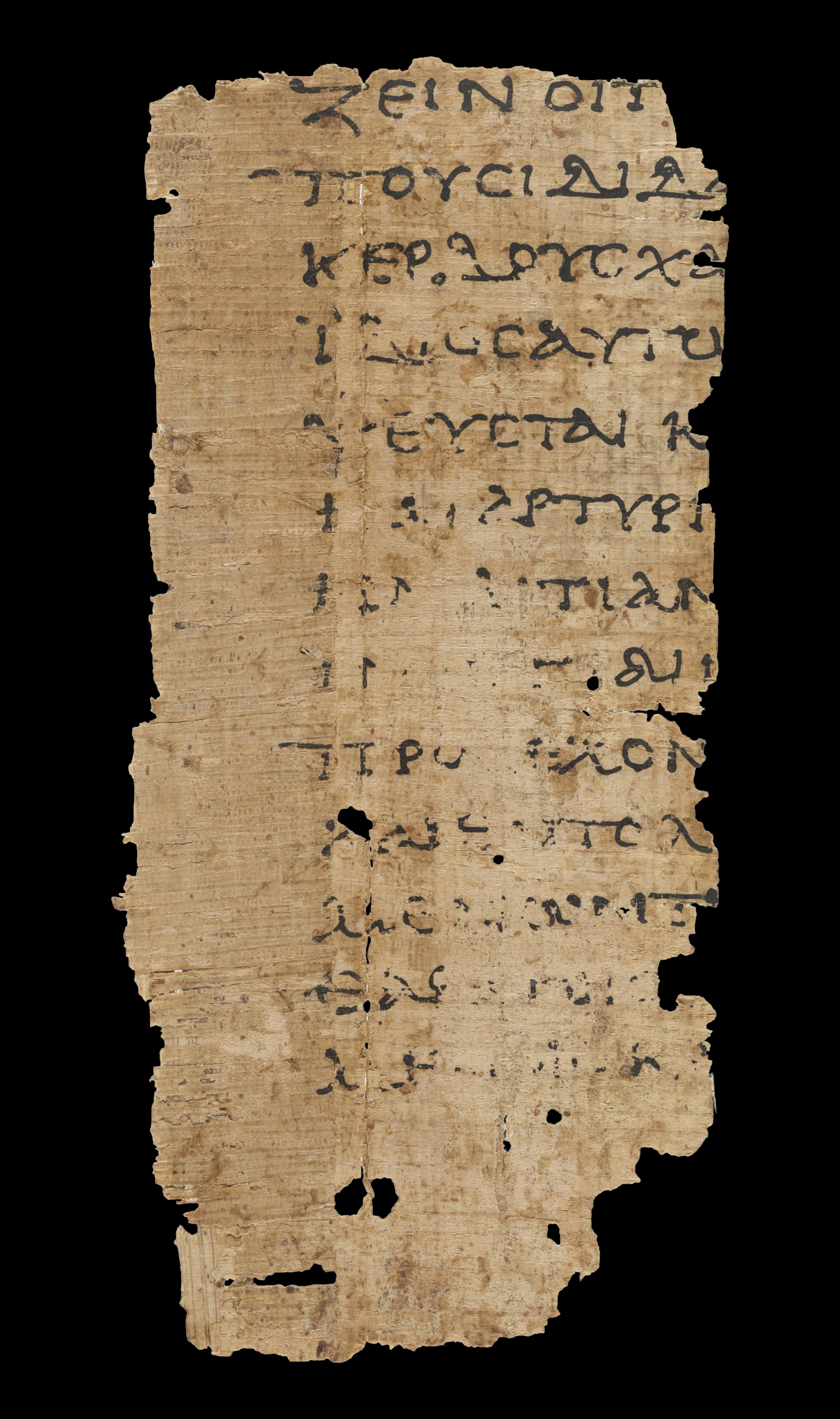
Titus 1:11–15 on Papyrus 32 (recto; c. AD 200)

The Epistle to Titus (Note: The book is sometimes called the Letter of Paul to Titus or simply Titus (which is also its most common form of abbreviation).) is one of the three pastoral epistles (along with 1 Timothy and 2 Timothy) in the New Testament, historically attributed to Paul the Apostle. It is addressed to Saint Titus and describes the requirements and duties of presbyters/bishops.

== Text ==
The epistle is divided into three chapters, 46 verses in total.

== Recipient ==
Not mentioned in the Acts of the Apostles, Saint Titus was noted in Galatians (cf. Galatians 2:1, 3) where Paul wrote of journeying to Jerusalem with Barnabas, accompanied by Titus. He was then dispatched to Corinth, Greece, where he successfully reconciled the Christian community there with Paul, its founder. Titus was later left on the island of Crete to help organize the church there, and later met back with the Apostle Paul in Nicopolis. He soon went to Dalmatia (now Croatia). According to Eusebius of Caesarea in the Ecclesiastical History, he served as the first bishop of Crete.

== Authenticity ==
=== Opposition to Pauline authenticity ===
Titus, along with the two other pastoral epistles (1 Timothy and 2 Timothy), is regarded by some scholars as being pseudepigraphical. On the basis of the language and content of the pastoral epistles, these scholars reject that they were written by Paul and believe that they were written by an anonymous forger after his death. Critics claim the vocabulary and style of the Pauline letters could not have been written by Paul according to available biographical information and reflect the views of the emerging church rather than the apostle's. These scholars date the epistle from the 80s AD up to the end of the 2nd century, though most would place it sometime between 80 and 100 AD. The Church of England's Common Worship Lectionary Scripture Commentary concurs with this view: "the proportioning of the theological and practical themes is one factor that leads us to think of these writings as coming from the post-Pauline church world of the late first or early second century".

Titus has a very close affinity with 1 Timothy, sharing similar phrases and expressions and similar subject matter. This has led many scholars to believe that it was written by the same author who wrote 1 and 2 Timothy: their author is sometimes referred to as "the Pastor".

The gnostic writer Basilides rejected the epistle.

=== Traditional view: Pauline authenticity ===
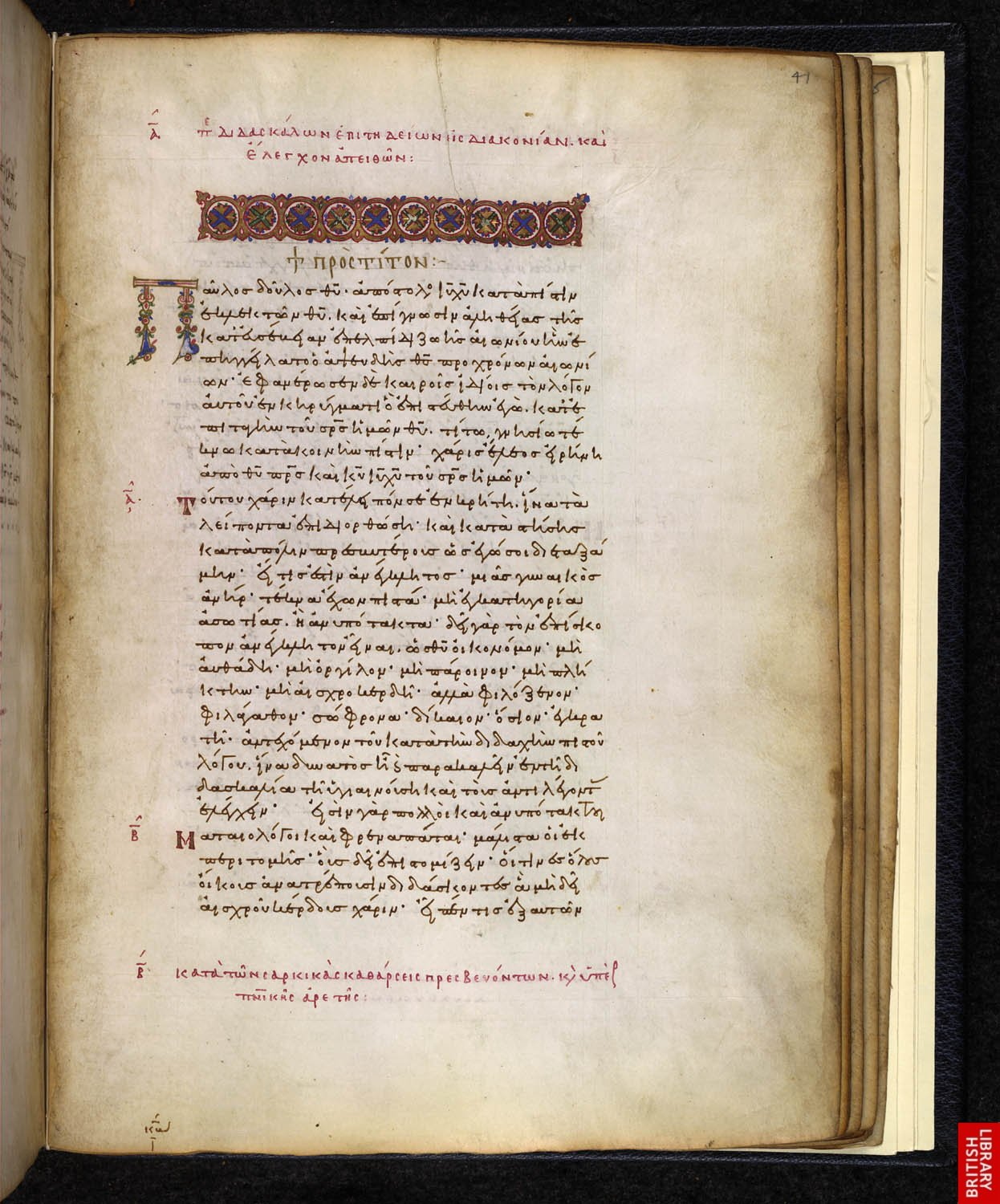
The first page of the epistle in Minuscule 699 gives its title as 'προς τιτον, 'To Titus.'

Recent scholarship has revived the theory that Paul used an amanuensis (secretary), in writing his letters (e.g. Romans 16:22), but possibly Luke for the pastorals. This was a common practice in ancient letter writing, even for the biblical writers.

== Epimenides paradox ==
One of the secular peculiarities of the Epistle to Titus is the reference to the Epimenides paradox: "One of the Cretans, a prophet of their own, said, 'Cretans are always liars'."

== See also ==
- Authorship of the Pauline epistles
- Faithful saying
- Textual variants in the Epistle to Titus

== Sources ==
Epistle to Titus Pauline Pastoral Epistle
| Preceded by Second Timothy | New Testament; Books of the Bible | Succeeded by Philemon |
