= Second Epistle to Timothy =

Book of the New Testament

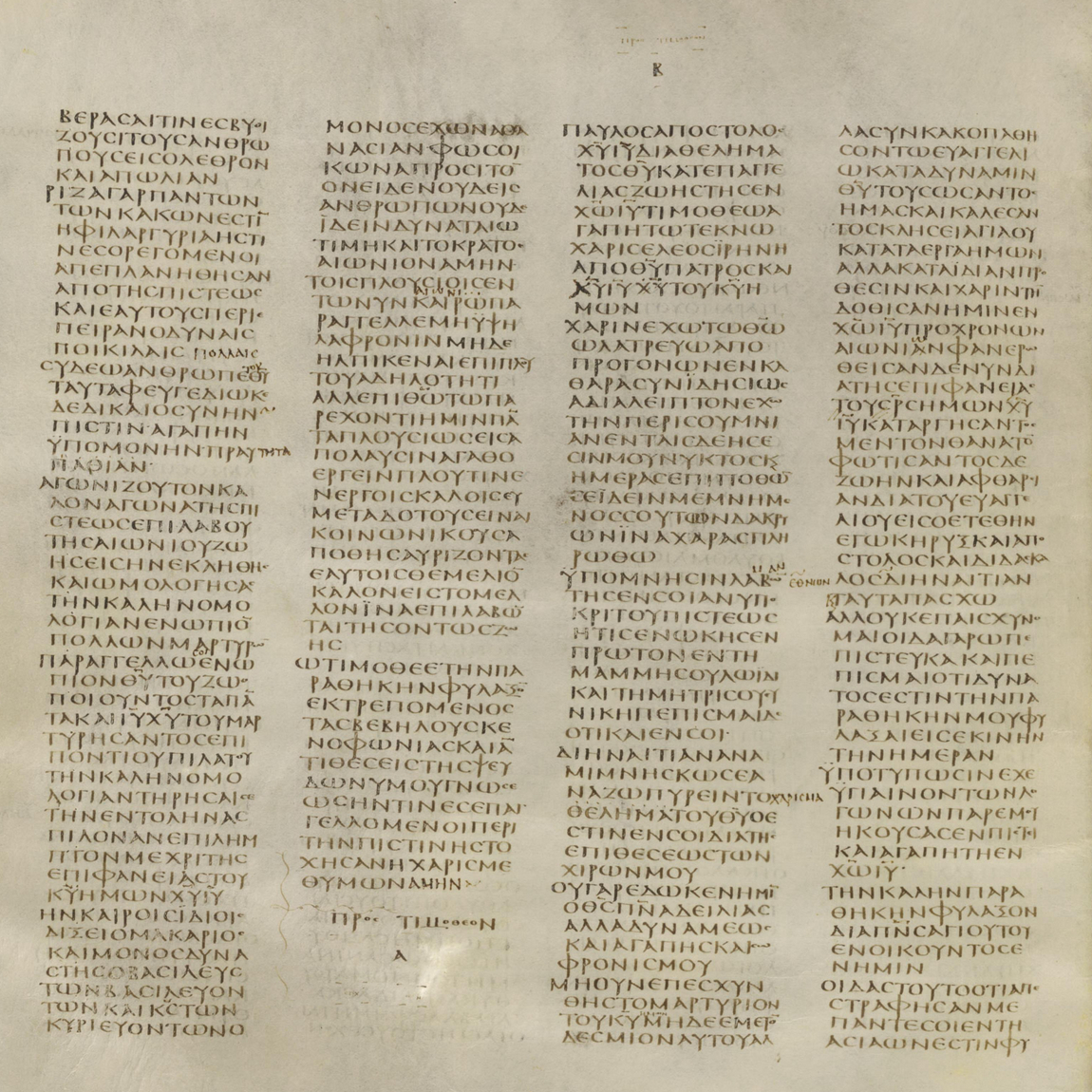
The end of 1 Timothy, continuing on to 2 Timothy 1:1–15 in Codex Sinaiticus (c. AD 350)

The Second Epistle to Timothy (Note: The book is sometimes called the Second Letter of Paul to Timothy, or simply 2 Timothy. It is most commonly abbreviated as "2 Tim.") is one of the three pastoral epistles traditionally attributed to Paul the Apostle. Addressed to Timothy, a fellow missionary, it is traditionally considered to be the last epistle Paul wrote before his death. The original language is Koine Greek.

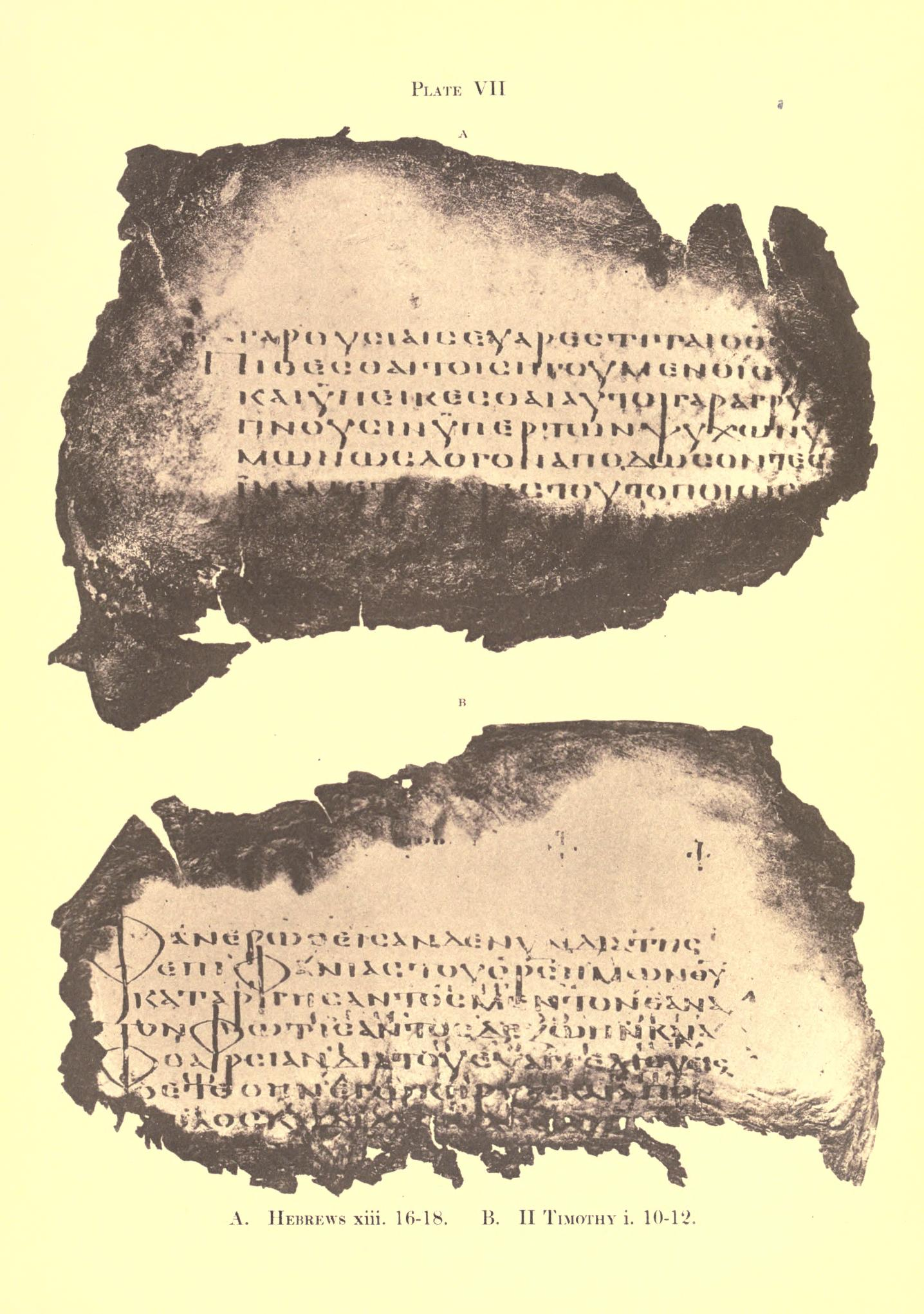
Fragment from the Codex Freerianus (5th century AD); the lower part shows text from 2 Timothy 1:10–12.

While the Pastorals are attributed to Paul, they differ from his other letters. Since the early 19th century, scholars have increasingly viewed them as the work of an unknown follower of Paul's teachings. This perspective arises from the fact that the Pastorals do not focus on Paul's typical themes, such as believers' unity with Christ, and they present a more organized and defined church hierarchy than in the other letters.

Nonetheless, a number of scholars still defend the traditional authorship of 2 Timothy.

== Authorship ==
Some modern critical scholars argue that 2 Timothy, as well as the other two so-called "pastoral letters" (1 Timothy and Titus), were not written by Paul but by an anonymous author, sometime between 90 and 140 AD. Some scholars refer to the assumedly pseudonymous author as "the Pastor".

The language and ideas of 2 Timothy are notably different from the other two pastoral epistles yet similar to the later Pauline epistles, especially the ones he wrote in captivity. This has led some scholars to conclude that the author of 2 Timothy is a different person from that of 1 Timothy and Titus. Raymond E. Brown proposed that this letter was written by a follower of Paul who had knowledge of Paul's last days.

Most scholars, both those arguing for and against its authenticity, are of the opinion that 2 Timothy belongs to a pseudepigraphic genre known as the testamentary genre or farewell discourse, the 'testament' genre contains two main elements: ethical warnings to be followed after the death of the writer and revelations of the future. The significant fact about the 'testament' genre was not in its markers but in its nature; it is argued that a piece of 'testament' literature is meant to "be a completely transparent fiction".

Jerome Murphy-O'Connor, however, argued that 2 Timothy was written by Paul and that the other two pastoral epistles were written by someone else using it as a model.

== Oldest surviving manuscripts ==
The original manuscript of this book is lost, as are about two centuries of the earliest copies. The text of surviving manuscripts varies. The oldest manuscripts containing some or all of the text of this book include:

- Codex Sinaiticus (AD 330–360)
- Codex Alexandrinus (400–440)
- Codex Ephraemi Rescriptus (c. 450)
- Codex Freerianus (c. 450)
- Codex Claromontanus (c. 550)
- Codex Coislinianus (c. 550)

== Content ==
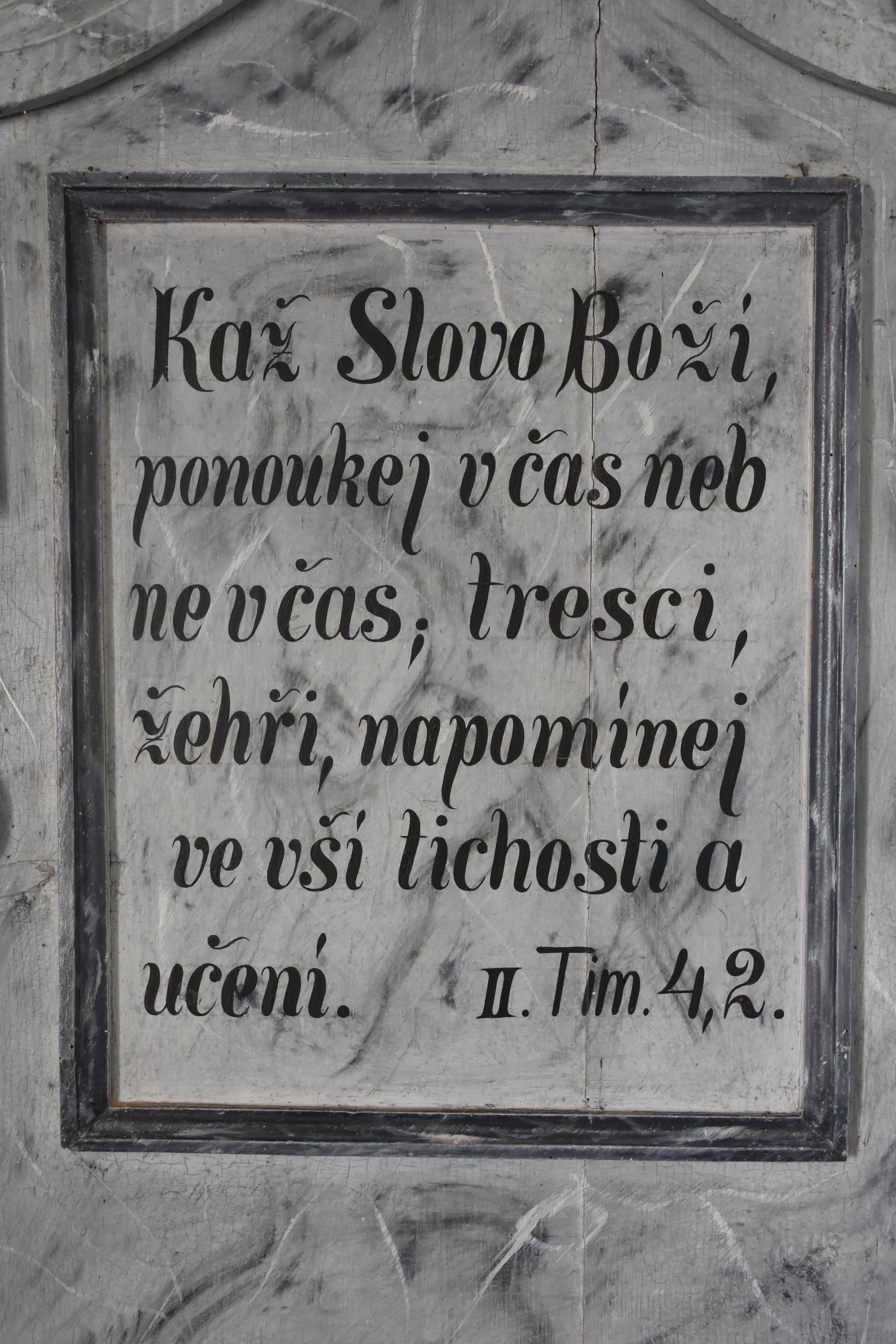
Quotation from 2 Timothy in Czech translation: "Preach the word; be prepared in season and out of season; correct, rebuke and encourage—with great patience and careful instruction." (NIV)

According to the letter, Paul urges Timothy not to have a "spirit of timidity" and not to "be ashamed to testify about our Lord" (1:7–8). He also entreats Timothy to come to him before winter, and to bring Mark with him (cf. Philippians 2:22). He was anticipating that "the time of his departure was at hand" (4:6), and he exhorts his "son Timothy" to all diligence and steadfastness in the face of false teachings, with advice about combating them with reference to the teachings of the past, and to patience under persecution (1:6–15), and to a faithful discharge of all the duties of his office (4:1–5), with all the solemnity of one who was about to appear before the Judge of the quick and the dead.

This letter contains one of Paul's Christological hymns in 2:11–13:

It is a faithful saying:
For if we be dead with him, we shall also live with him:
If we suffer, we shall also reign with him:
if we deny him, he also will deny us:
If we believe not, yet he abideth faithful: he cannot deny himself.

— King James Version

or

The saying is trustworthy, for:
If we have died with him, we will also live with him;
if we endure, we will also reign with him;
if we deny him, he also will deny us;
if we are faithless, he remains faithful—
for he cannot deny himself.

— English Standard Version

Paul is depicted in the letter, which may have been written after his death, as anticipating his being put to death and realities beyond in his valedictory found in 2 Timothy 4:6–8: "For I am now ready to be offered, and the time of my departure is at hand. I have fought a good fight, I have finished my course, I have kept the faith: Henceforth there is laid up for me a crown of righteousness, which the Lord, the righteous judge, shall give me at that day: and not to me only, but unto all them also that love his appearing."

Portions of 2 Timothy parallel the Epistle to the Philippians, also believed to have been written (with Timothy's help) near the time of Paul's death.

Based on the traditional view that 2 Timothy was Paul's final epistle, chapter 4 talks (v. 10) about how Demas, formerly considered a "fellow worker", had deserted him for Thessalonica, "having loved this present world". In sharp contrast to his dispute with Barnabas over Mark (Acts 15:37–40), which resulted in the two parting ways, Paul now considered Mark to be "profitable to the ministry" (v. 11). Chapter 4 also features the only biblical mention of Linus (v. 21), who in Catholic tradition is listed as Peter's immediate successor as Bishop of Rome.

In the epistle, Paul asks Timothy to bring his coat and books to him next time he sees him.

2 Timothy 2:14-16 contains a number of commands addressed to Paul's co-worker (in the second person) about how one to teach or relate to those in disputes pertaining heresy. The teaching of Paul was regarded authoritative by Gnostic and anti-Gnostic groups alike in the second century, but this epistle stands out firmly and becomes a basis for anti-Gnostic positions.

== See also ==
- Biblical inspiration
- Epistle to Titus
- First Epistle to Timothy
- Itching ears
- Textual variants in the Second Epistle to Timothy

== Notes ==
Second Epistle to Timothy Pauline Pastoral Epistle
Preceded by First Timothy	New Testament; Books of the Bible	Succeeded by Titus
