= Isaac Newton's occult studies =

Works by Newton now seen as non-scientific

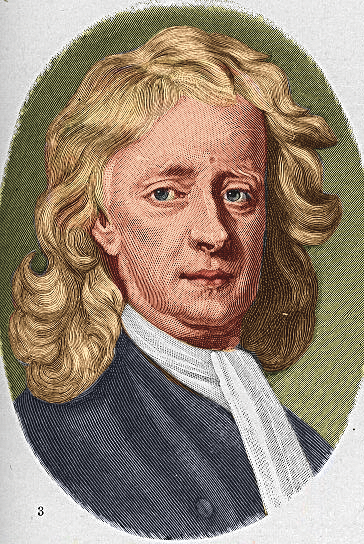
Colorized engraving after Enoch Seeman's 1726 portrait of Newton

English physicist and mathematician Isaac Newton produced works exploring chronology, biblical interpretation (especially of the Apocalypse), and alchemy. Some of which could be considered studying the occult. Newton's scientific work may have been of lesser personal importance to him, as he placed emphasis on rediscovering the wisdom of the ancients. Historical research on Newton's occult studies in relation to his science have also been used to challenge the disenchantment narrative within critical theory.

Newton lived during the early modern period, when the educated class embraced a world view different from that of later centuries. Distinctions between science, superstition, and pseudoscience were still being formulated, and a devoutly Christian biblical perspective permeated Western culture.

== Alchemical research ==
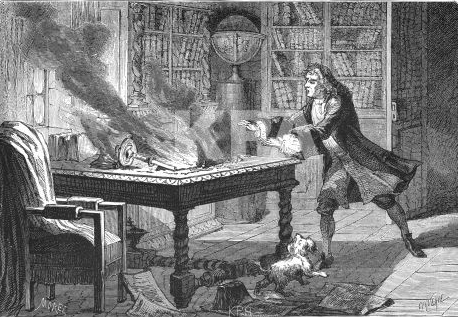
An 1874 engraving showing a probably apocryphal account of Newton's lab fire. In the story, Newton's dog, Diamond, started the fire, burning 20 years of research. Newton is thought to have said: "O Diamond, Diamond, thou little knowest the mischief thou hast done."

Much of what are known as Isaac Newton's occult studies can largely be attributed to his study of alchemy. From a young age, Newton was deeply interested in all forms of natural sciences and materials science, an interest which would ultimately lead to some of his better-known contributions to science. His earliest encounters with certain alchemical theories and practices were when he was twelve years old, and boarding in the attic of an apothecary's shop. During Newton's lifetime, the study of chemistry was still in its infancy, so many of his experimental studies used esoteric language and vague terminology more typically associated with alchemy and occultism. It was not until several decades after Newton's death that experiments of stoichiometry under the pioneering works of Antoine Lavoisier were conducted, and analytical chemistry, with its associated nomenclature, came to resemble modern chemistry as we know it today. However, Newton's contemporary and fellow Royal Society member Robert Boyle had already discovered the basic concepts of modern chemistry and began establishing modern norms of experimental practice and communication in chemistry, information which Newton did not use.

Much of Newton's writing on alchemy may have been lost in a fire in his laboratory, so the true extent of his work in this area may have been larger than is currently known. Newton also suffered a nervous breakdown during his period of alchemical work.

Newton's writings suggest that one of the main goals of his alchemy may have been the discovery of the philosopher's stone (a material believed to turn base metals into gold), and perhaps to a lesser extent, the discovery of the highly coveted Elixir of Life. Newton reportedly believed that Diana's Tree, an alchemical demonstration producing a dendritic "growth" of silver from solution, was evidence that metals "possessed a sort of life."

Some practices of alchemy were banned in England during Newton's lifetime, due in part to unscrupulous practitioners who would often promise wealthy benefactors unrealistic results in an attempt to swindle them. The English Crown, also fearing the potential devaluation of gold because of the creation of fake gold, made penalties for alchemy very severe. In some cases, the punishment for unsanctioned alchemy would include the public hanging of an offender on a gilded scaffold while adorned with tinsel and other items.

== Writings ==
Due to the threat of punishment and the potential scrutiny he feared from his peers within the scientific community, Newton may have deliberately left his work on alchemical subjects unpublished. Newton was well known as being highly sensitive to criticism, such as the numerous instances when he was criticized by Robert Hooke, and his admitted reluctance to publish any substantial information regarding calculus before 1693. A perfectionist by nature, Newton also refrained from publication of material that he felt was incomplete, as evident from a 38-year gap from Newton's conception of calculus in 1666 and its final full publication in 1704, which would ultimately lead to the infamous Leibniz–Newton calculus controversy.

Most of the scientist's manuscript heritage after his death passed to John Conduitt, the husband of his niece Catherine. To evaluate the manuscripts, physician Thomas Pellet was involved, who decided that only "the Chronology of Ancient Kingdoms", an unreleased fragment of "Principia", "Observations upon the Prophesies of Daniel and the Apocalypse of St. John" and "Paradoxical Questions Concerning the Morals and Actions of Athanasius and His Followers" were suitable for publication. The remaining manuscripts, according to Pellet, were "foul draughts of the Prophetic stile" and were not suitable for publication. After the death of J. Conduitt in 1737, manuscripts were transferred to Catherine, who unsuccessfully tried to publish the theological notes of her uncle. She consulted with Newton's friend, the theologian Arthur Ashley Sykes (1684–1756). Sykes kept eleven manuscripts for himself, and the rest of the archive passed into the family of Catherine's daughter, who married John Wallop, Viscount Lymington, and was then owned by the Earls of Portsmouth. After Sykes' death, his documents came to the Rev. Jeffery Ekins (d. 1791) and were kept in his family until they were presented to the New College, Oxford in 1872. Until the mid-19th century, few had access to the Portsmouth collection, including David Brewster, a renowned physicist and biographer of Newton. In 1872, the fifth Earl of Portsmouth transferred part of the manuscripts (mainly of a physical and mathematical nature) to Cambridge University.

In 1936, a collection of Isaac Newton's unpublished works was auctioned by Sotheby's on behalf of Gerard Wallop, 9th Earl of Portsmouth. Known as the "Portsmouth Papers", this material consisted of 329 lots of Newton's manuscripts, over a third of which were filled with content that appeared to be alchemical in nature. At the time of Newton's death this material was considered "unfit to publish" by Newton's estate, and consequently fell into obscurity until their somewhat sensational reemergence in 1936.

At the auction, many of these documents, along with Newton's death mask, were purchased by economist John Maynard Keynes, who throughout his life collected many of Newton's alchemical writings. From these texts, Keynes would describe Newton as the "last of the magicians", akin to Sumerian and Babylonian priests, and as someone the magi would have honoured. Much of the Keynes collection later passed to document collector Abraham Yahuda, who was himself a vigorous collector of Isaac Newton's original manuscripts.

Many of the documents collected by Keynes and Yahuda are now in the Jewish National and University Library in Jerusalem. In recent years, several projects have begun to gather, catalogue, and transcribe the fragmented collection of Newton's work on alchemical subjects and make them freely available for online access. Two of these are The Chymistry of Isaac Newton Project supported by the U.S. National Science Foundation, and The Newton Project supported by the U.K. Arts and Humanities Research Board. In addition, The Jewish National and University Library has published a number of high-quality scanned images of various Newton documents.

=== The Philosopher's Stone ===
Of the material sold during the 1936 Sotheby's auction, several documents indicate an interest by Newton in the procurement or development of the philosopher's stone. Most notable are documents entitled Artephius his secret Book, followed by The Epistle of Iohn Pontanus, wherein he beareth witness of ye book of Artephius; these are themselves a collection of excerpts from another work entitled Nicholas Flammel, His Exposition of the Hieroglyphicall Figures which he caused to be painted upon an Arch in St Innocents Church-yard in Paris. Together with The secret Booke of Artephius, And the Epistle of Iohn Pontanus: Containing both the Theoricke and the Practicke of the Philosophers Stone. This work may also have been referenced by Newton in its Latin version found within Lazarus Zetzner's Theatrum Chemicum, a volume often associated with the Turba Philosophorum, and other early European alchemical manuscripts. Nicolas Flamel, one subject of the aforementioned work, was a notable, though mysterious figure, often associated with the discovery of the philosopher's stone, hieroglyphical figures, early forms of tarot, and occultism. Artephius, and his "secret book", were also subjects of interest to 17th-century alchemists.

Also in the 1936 auction of Newton's collection was The Epitome of the treasure of health written by Edwardus Generosus Anglicus innominatus who lived Anno Domini 1562. This is a twenty-eight-page treatise on the philosopher's stone, the Animal or Angelicall Stone, the Prospective stone or magical stone of Moses, and the vegetable or the growing stone. The treatise concludes with an alchemical poem.

==== Other works ====
Newton's various surviving alchemical notebooks clearly show that he made no distinctions between alchemy and what's now considered science. Optical experiments were written on the same pages as recipes from arcane sources. Newton did not always record his chemical experiments in the most transparent way. Alchemists were notorious for veiling their writings in impenetrable jargon; Newton himself invented new symbols and systems.

== Biblical studies ==
In a manuscript from 1704, Newton describes his attempts to extract scientific information from the Bible and estimates that the world would end no earlier than 2060. In predicting this, he said, "This I mention not to assert when the time of the end shall be, but to put a stop to the rash conjectures of fanciful men who are frequently predicting the time of the end, and by doing so bring the sacred prophecies into discredit as often as their predictions fail."

=== Newton's studies of the Temple of Solomon ===
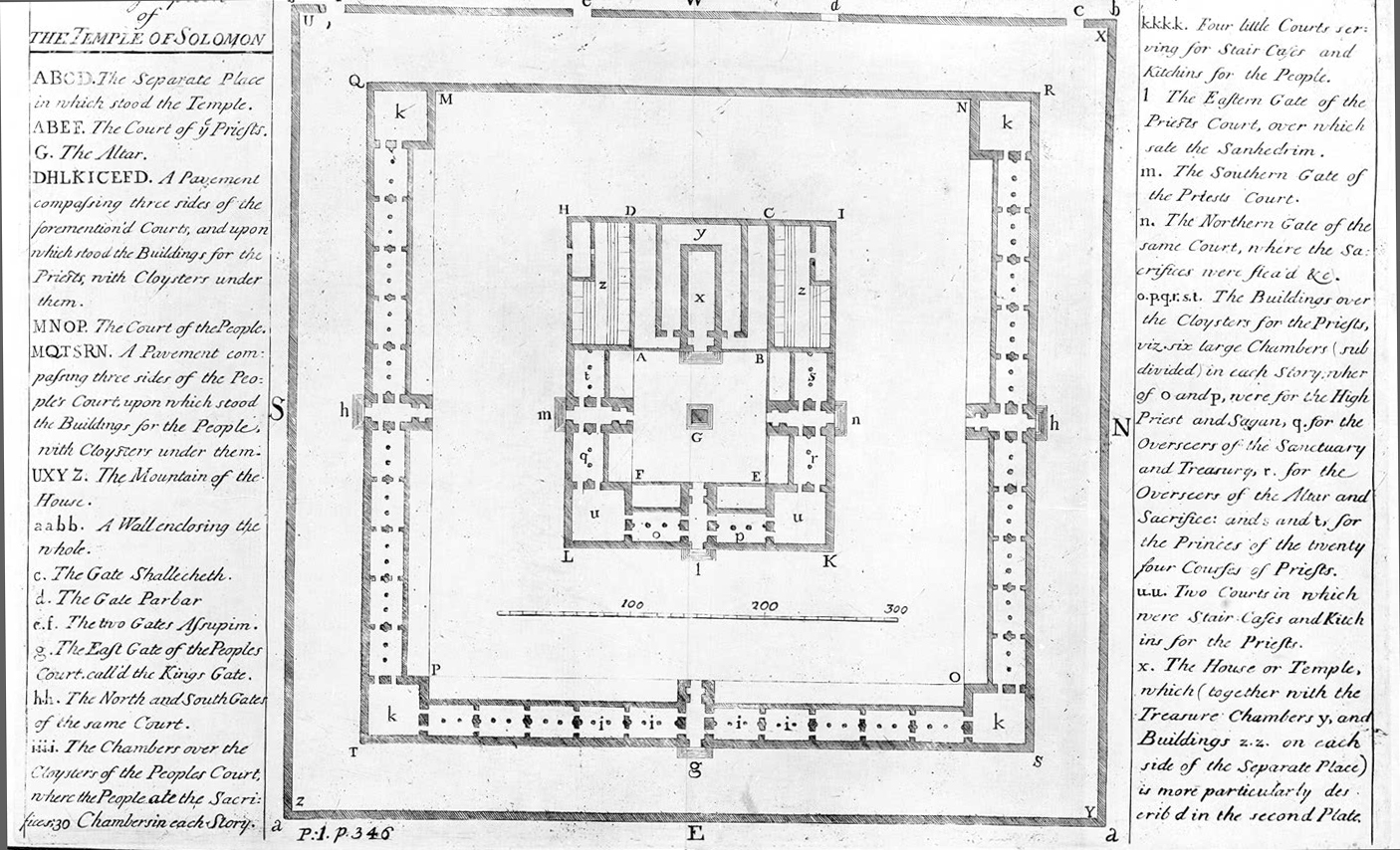
Isaac Newton's diagram of part of the Temple of Solomon, taken from Plate 1 of The Chronology of Ancient Kingdoms Amended (published London, 1728)

Newton extensively studied and wrote about the Temple of Solomon, dedicating an entire chapter of The Chronology of Ancient Kingdoms Amended to his observations of the temple. Newton's primary source for information was the description of the structure given within 1 Kings of the Hebrew Bible as well as the Book of Ezekiel, which he translated himself from Hebrew with the help of dictionaries, as his knowledge of that language was limited.

In addition to scripture, Newton also relied upon various ancient and contemporary sources while studying the temple. He believed that many ancient sources were endowed with sacred wisdom and that the proportions of many of their temples were in themselves sacred. This concept, often termed prisca sapientia (sacred wisdom and also the ancient wisdom that was revealed to Adam and Moses directly by God), was a common belief of many scholars during Newton's lifetime.

A more contemporary source for Newton's studies of the temple was Juan Bautista Villalpando, who just a few decades earlier had published an influential manuscript entitled In Ezechielem explanationes et apparatus urbis, ac templi Hierosolymitani (1596–1605), in which Villalpando comments on the visions of the biblical prophet Ezekiel, including within this work his own interpretations and elaborate reconstructions of Solomon's Temple. In its time, Villalpando's work on the temple produced a great deal of interest throughout Europe and had a significant impact upon later architects and scholars.

Newton believed that the temple was designed by King Solomon with privileged eyes and divine guidance. To Newton, the geometry of the temple represented more than a mathematical blueprint; it also provided a time-frame chronology of Hebrew history. It was for this reason that he included a chapter devoted to the temple within The Chronology of Ancient Kingdoms Amended.

Newton felt that just as the writings of ancient philosophers, scholars, and biblical figures contained within them unknown sacred wisdom, the same was true of their architecture. He believed that these men had hidden their knowledge in a complex code of symbolic and mathematical language that, when deciphered, would reveal an unknown knowledge of how nature works.

In 1675, Newton annotated a copy of Manna – a disquisition of the nature of alchemy, an anonymous treatise which had been given to him by his fellow scholar Ezechiel Foxcroft. In his annotation Newton reflected upon his reasons for examining Solomon's Temple:

This philosophy, both speculative and active, is not only to be found in the volume of nature, but also in the sacred scriptures, as in Genesis, Job, Psalms, Isaiah and others. In the knowledge of this philosophy, God made Solomon the greatest philosopher in the world.

During Newton's lifetime, there was great interest in the Temple of Solomon in Europe, due to the success of Villalpando's publications, and a vogue for detailed engravings and physical models presented in various galleries for public viewing. In 1628, Judah Leon Templo produced a model of the temple and surrounding Jerusalem, which was popular in its day. Around 1692, Gerhard Schott produced a highly detailed model of the temple, for use in an opera in Hamburg composed by Christian Heinrich Postel. This immense 13-foot-high (4.0 m) and 80-foot-around (24 m) model was later sold in 1725 and was exhibited in London as early as 1723, and then later temporarily installed at the London Royal Exchange from 1729 to 1730, where it could be viewed for half-a-crown. Isaac Newton's most comprehensive work on the temple, found within The Chronology of Ancient Kingdoms Amended, was published posthumously in 1728, only adding to the public interest in the temple.

=== Newton's interpretations of prophecy ===
Newton considered himself to be one of a select group of individuals who were specially chosen by God for the task of understanding biblical scripture. He was a strong believer in a prophetic interpretation of the Bible, and like many of his contemporaries in Protestant England, he developed a strong affinity and deep admiration for the teachings and works of Joseph Mede. Although he never wrote a cohesive body of work on prophecy, Newton's belief led him to write several treatises on the subject, including an unpublished guide for prophetic interpretation entitled Rules for interpreting the words & language in Scripture. In this manuscript he details the necessary requirements for what he considered to be the proper interpretation of the Bible.

In addition, Newton would spend much of his life seeking and revealing what could be considered a Bible Code. He placed a great deal of emphasis upon the interpretation of the Book of Revelation, writing generously upon this book and authoring several manuscripts detailing his interpretations. Unlike a prophet in the true sense of the word, Newton relied upon existing Scripture to prophesy for him, believing his interpretations would set the record straight in the face of what he considered to be "so little understood". In 1754, 27 years after his death, Isaac Newton's treatise An Historical Account of Two Notable Corruptions of Scripture would be published, and although it does not argue any prophetic meaning, it does exemplify what Newton considered to be just one popular misunderstanding of Scripture.

Although Newton's approach to these studies could not be considered a scientific approach, he did write as if his findings were the result of evidence-based research.

=== 2060 ===
In late February and early March 2003, a large amount of media attention circulated around the globe regarding largely unknown and unpublished documents, evidently written by Newton, indicating that he believed the world would end no earlier than 2060. The story garnered vast amounts of public interest and found its way onto the front page of several widely distributed newspapers, including the UK's Daily Telegraph, Canada's National Post, Israel's Maariv and Yediot Aharonot, and was also featured in an article in the scientific journal Canadian Journal of History. Television and internet stories in the following weeks heightened the exposure and ultimately would include the production of several documentary films focused upon the topic of the 2060 prediction and some of Newton's lesser known beliefs and practices.

The two documents detailing this prediction are currently housed within the Jewish National and University Library in Jerusalem. Both were believed to be written toward the end of Newton's life, circa 1705, a time frame most notably established by the use of the full title of Sir Isaac Newton within portions of the documents.

These documents do not appear to have been written with the intention of publication and Newton expressed a strong personal dislike for individuals who provided specific dates for the Apocalypse purely for sensational value. Furthermore, he at no time provides a specific date for the end of the world in either of these documents.

To understand the reasoning behind the 2060 prediction, an understanding of Newton's theological beliefs should be taken into account, particularly his apparent antitrinitarian beliefs and his Protestant views on the Papacy. Both of these lay essential to his calculations, which ultimately would provide the 2060 time frame. See Isaac Newton's religious views for more details.

The first document, part of the Yahuda collection, is a small letter slip, on the back of which is written haphazardly in Newton's hand:

Prop. 1. The 2300 prophetick days did not commence before the rise of the little horn of the He Goat.

2 Those day [sic] did not commence a[f]ter the destruction of Jerusalem & ye Temple by the Romans A.[D.] 70.

3 The time times & half a time did not commence before the year 800 in wch the Popes supremacy commenced

4 They did not commence after the re[ig]ne of Gregory the 7th. 1084

5 The 1290 days did not commence b[e]fore the year 842.

6 They did not commence after the reign of Pope Greg. 7th. 1084

7 The diffence [sic] between the 1290 & 1335 days are a parts of the seven weeks.

Therefore the 2300 years do not end before ye year 2132 nor after 2370. The time times & half time do n[o]t end before 2060 nor after. The 1290 days do not begin [this should read: end] before 2090 nor after 1374 [sic; Newton probably means 2374]

The second reference to the 2060 prediction can be found in a folio, in which Newton writes:

So then the time times & half a time are 42 months or 1260 days or three years & an half, recconing twelve months to a yeare & 30 days to a month as was done in the Calendar of the primitive year. And the days of short lived Beasts being put for the years of lived [sic for "long lived"] kingdoms, the period of 1260 days, if dated from the complete conquest of the three kings A.C. 800, will end A.C. 2060. It may end later, but I see no reason for its ending sooner. This I mention not to assert when the time of the end shall be, but to put a stop to the rash conjectures of fancifull men who are frequently predicting the time of the end, & by doing so bring the sacred prophesies into discredit as often as their predictions fail. Christ comes as a thief in the night, & it is not for us to know the times & seasons wch God hath put into his own breast.

Clearly Newton's mathematical prediction of the end of the world is one derived from his interpretation of not only scripture, but also one based upon his theological viewpoint regarding specific chronological dates and events as he saw them.

Newton may not have been referring to the post 2060 event as a destructive act resulting in the annihilation of the globe and its inhabitants, but rather one in which he believed the world, as he saw it, was to be replaced with a new one based upon a transition to an era of divinely inspired peace. In Christian and Islamic theology this concept is often referred to as The Second Coming of Jesus Christ and the establishment of The Kingdom of God on Earth. In a separate manuscript, Isaac Newton paraphrases Revelation 21 and 22 and relates the post 2060 events by writing:

A new heaven & new earth. New Jerusalem comes down from heaven prepared as a Bride adorned for her husband. The marriage supper. God dwells with men wipes away all tears from their eyes, gives them of ye fountain of living water & creates all thin things new saying, It is done. The glory & felicity of the New Jerusalem is represented by a building of Gold & Gemms enlightened by the glory of God & ye Lamb & watered by ye river of Paradise on ye banks of which grows the tree of life. Into this city the kings of the earth do bring their glory & that of the nations & the saints reign for ever & ever.

== Newton's chronology ==
Newton wrote extensively upon the historical topic of chronology. In 1728 The Chronology of Ancient Kingdoms Amended, an approximately 87,000-word composition that details the rise and history of various ancient kingdoms, was published. It was published posthumously, although the majority of it had been reviewed for publication by Newton himself. As such, this work represents one of his last known personally reviewed publications. Sometime around 1701, he also produced a thirty-page unpublished treatise entitled "The Original of Monarchies" detailing the rise of several monarchs throughout antiquity, and tracing them back to the biblical figure of Noah.

Newton's chronological writing focuses on Greece, Anatolia, Egypt, and the Levant. Many of his dates do not correlate with current historical knowledge. While Newton mentions several pre-historical events found within the Bible, the oldest actual historical date he provides is 1125 BC. In this entry he mentions Mephres, a ruler over Upper Egypt from the territories of Syene to Heliopolis, and his successor Misphragmuthosis. However, during 1125 BC the Pharaoh of Egypt is now understood to be Ramesses IX.

Although some of the dates Newton provides for various events are accurate by 17th century standards, archaeology as a form of modern science did not exist in Newton's time. In fact, the majority of the conclusionary dates which Newton cites are based on the works of Herodotus, Pliny, Plutarch, Homer, and various other classical historians, authors, and poets who were themselves often citing secondary sources and oral records of uncertain date.

=== Newton's Atlantis ===
The Chronology of Ancient Kingdoms Amended contains passages on the land of Atlantis. The first such passage is part of his Short Chronicle which indicates his belief that Homer's Ulysses left the island of Ogygia in 896 BC. In Greek mythology, Ogygia was home to Calypso, the daughter of Atlas (after whom Atlantis was named). Some scholars have suggested that Ogygia and Atlantis are locationally connected, or possibly the same island. From his writings it appears Newton may have shared this belief. Newton also lists Cadis or Cales as possible candidates for Ogygia, though does not cite his reasons for believing so.

== Newton and secret societies ==
Newton has often been associated with various secret societies and fraternal orders throughout history. Due to a lack of reliable sources, it is difficult to establish his actual membership in any specific organization, despite the number of Masonic buildings named after him.

Regardless of his own membership status, Newton was a known associate of many individuals who themselves have often been labeled as members of various esoteric groups. It is unclear if these associations were a result of his being a well established and prominently publicized scholar, an early member and sitting President of the Royal Society (1703–1727), a prominent figure of State and Master of the Mint, a recognized Knight, or if Newton actually sought active membership within these esoteric organizations himself. Considering the nature and legality of alchemical practices during his lifetime, as well as his possession of various materials and manuscripts pertaining to alchemical research, Newton may very well have been a member of a group of like minded thinkers and colleagues. The organized level of this group (if in fact any existed), the level of their secrecy, as well as the depth of Newton's involvement within them, remains unclear.

He was known to be a member of The Royal Society of London for the Improvement of Natural Knowledge and the Spalding Gentlemen's Society, but these are considered learned societies, and not esoteric societies. Newton's membership status within any particular secret society remains largely speculative.

Alain Bauer who served as Grand Master of the Grand Orient in France, claimed that Newton and his contemporaries flourished because of a form of Freemasonry. One that was an amalgam of alchemic practice, mysticism and science, linking these esoteric traditions with early scientific societies.

=== Newton and the Rosicrucians ===
Perhaps the movement which most influenced Isaac Newton was Rosicrucianism.

The Rosicrucian belief in being specially chosen for the ability to communicate with angels or spirits is echoed in Newton's prophetic beliefs. Additionally, the Rosicrucians proclaimed to have the ability to live forever through the use of the elixir vitae and the ability to produce limitless amounts of time and gold from the use of the philosopher's stone, which they claimed to have in their possession. Like Newton, the Rosicrucians were deeply religious, avowedly Christian, anti-Catholic, and highly politicised. Isaac Newton would have a deep interest in not just their alchemical pursuits, but also their belief in esoteric truths of the ancient past and the belief in enlightened individuals with the ability to gain insight into nature, the physical universe, and the spiritual realm.

At the time of his death, Newton had 169 books on the topic of alchemy in his personal library, and was believed to have considerably more books on this topic during his Cambridge years, though he may have sold them before moving to London in 1696. For its time, his was considered one of the finest alchemical libraries in the world. In his library, Newton left behind a heavily annotated personal copy of The Fame and Confession of the Fraternity R.C., by Thomas Vaughan which represents an English translation of The Rosicrucian Manifestos. Newton also possessed copies of Themis Aurea and Symbola Aurea Mensae Duodecium by the learned alchemist Michael Maier, both of which are significant early books about the Rosicrucian movement. These books were also extensively annotated by Newton.

Newton's ownership of these materials by no means denotes membership within any early Rosicrucian order. Furthermore, considering that his personal alchemical investigations were focused upon discovering materials which the Rosicrucians professed to already be in possession of long before he was born, would seem to some to exclude Newton from their membership. During his own life, Newton was openly accused of being a Rosicrucian, as were many members of The Royal Society.

Initially, the Rosicrucians were not supposed to be real people. The first "real" Rosicrucians appeared in the 18th century, probably after Newton's death, i.e. they appeared in 1763.
