= Textual variants in the First Epistle to Timothy =

Textual variants in the First Epistle to Timothy are the subject of the study called textual criticism of the New Testament. Textual variants in manuscripts arise when a copyist makes deliberate or inadvertent alterations to a text that is being reproduced. An abbreviated list of textual variants in this particular book is given in this article below.

Most of the variations are not significant and some common alterations include the deletion, rearrangement, repetition, or replacement of one or more words when the copyist's eye returns to a similar word in the wrong location of the original text. If their eye skips to an earlier word, they may create a repetition (error of dittography). If their eye skips to a later word, they may create an omission. They may resort to performing a rearranging of words to retain the overall meaning without compromising the context. In other instances, the copyist may add text from memory from a similar or parallel text in another location. Otherwise, they may also replace some text of the original with an alternative reading. Spellings occasionally change. Synonyms may be substituted. A pronoun may be changed into a proper noun (such as "he said" becoming "Jesus said"). John Mill's 1707 Greek New Testament was estimated to contain some 30,000 variants in its accompanying textual apparatus which was based on "nearly 100 [Greek] manuscripts." Peter J. Gurry puts the number of non-spelling variants among New Testament manuscripts around 500,000, though he acknowledges his estimate is higher than all previous ones.

== Legend ==
This is a guide to the sigla (symbols and abbreviations) most frequently used in citations of source material for a Greek New Testament (NT) manuscript. Editors of a scholarly critical text of the NT use each siglum to shrink the space needed for listing witnesses to a particular reading in the critical apparatus. The intended reader, a Bible translator, scholar, orator, or student, needs to know these abbreviations, e.g. for deciding whether to use alternative readings of the critical text or to understand the origin and attestation of a particular passage.

General sigla

# beginning with 0: uncial
# not beginning with 0: minuscule
^{*} superscript: original reading
^{app} superscript: the critical apparatus reading
^{c} superscript: scribal correction
^{com} superscript: Biblical commentary reading
^{1,2,3...} superscripts: 1st, 2nd, 3rd... scribal corrections
^{v.l.} superscript: varia lectio, i.e. alternative reading
^{mg} superscript: reading in the margin
^{ms} superscript: individual manuscript
^{mss} superscript: multiple manuscripts
^{pt} superscript: partial attestation
^{s} superscript: reading in a supplement to the text
^{txt} superscript: the reading of the text
^{vid} superscript: apparent but uncertain reading
aeth or eth: Ethiopic versions
arab: Arabic versions
arm: Armenian versions
Byz: Byzantine text-type in the Catholic letters and superscript:

pt: a part of the Codices Byzantini

cop: Coptic versions

ac or akh: Akhmimic version
ac^{2}: Subakhmimic or Lycopolitanic version
bo: Boharic version
cv: Dialect V
cw: Dialect W
fa or fay or mf: Fayyumic Version
mae: Middle Egyptian or Mesokemic version
pbo: Proto-Bohartic version
sa: Sahidic version

ƒ: individually-numbered Greek manuscript family - superscripts:

1: Family 1
13: Family 13

geo: Georgian versions
goth: Gothic versions
it: Italic/Vetus Latina, lowercase letters for individual Old Latin manuscripts
lat: most Italic and Vulgate
latt: all Italic and Vulgate
P or 𝔓: papyrus
𝑙 or ℓ: individually numbered lectionary
Lect: most or all numbered lectionaries
𝔐: Greek Majority text and superscripts:

A: Andreas of Caesarea commentary in Revelation
C: Complutensian tradition
K: the Koine tradition in Revelation

o: omits
parenthesized (): reading or witness with a slight difference
pm: permulti: i.e., many
rell: all other extant manuscripts
slav: Slavic versions in Old Church Slavonic
syr or sy: Syriac versions and superscripts:

c or cur: Curetonian Gospels
s: Sinaitic Palimpsest
h: Harclean Syriac
hmg: Harclean Syriac, margin
pal: Palestinian Syriac
p: the Peshitta

vg: Latin Vulgate and superscripts:

cl: Editio Clementina
s: Editio Sixtina
st: Vulgata Stuttgartiensis 2007
ww: Wordsworth/White Vulgate

Greek Uncials (siglum or leading 0)

א: Codex Sinaiticus (01)
A: Codex Alexandrinus (02)
B: Codex Vaticanus (03)
C: Codex Ephraemi Rescriptus (04)
D^{ea}: Codex Bezae (05)
D^{p}: Codex Claromontanus (06)
E: Codex Basilensis A. N. III. 12 (07)
E^{a}: Codex Laudianus (08)
F^{p}: Codex Augiensis (010)
G^{e}: Codex Seidelianus I (011)
G^{p}: Codex Boernerianus (012)
H^{e}: Codex Seidelianus II (013)
H^{a}: Codex Mutinensis (014)
H^{p}: Codex Coislinianus (015)
I: Codex Freerianus (016)
K^{e}: Codex Cyprius (017)
K^{ap}: Codex Mosquensis I (018)
L^{e}: Codex Regius (New Testament) (019)
L^{ap}: Codex Angelicus (020)
N: Codex Petropolitanus Purpureus (022)
O: Sinope Gospels (023)
P^{apr}: Codex Porphyrianus (025)
Q: Codex Guelferbytanus B (026)
R: Codex Nitriensis (027)
S: Codex Vaticanus 354 (028)
T: Codex Borgianus (029)
V: Codex Mosquensis II (031)
W: Codex Washingtonianus (032)
Z: Codex Dublinensis (035)
Γ: Codex Tischendorfianus IV (036)
Δ: Codex Sangallensis 48 (037)
Θ: Codex Koridethi (038)
Ξ: Codex Zacynthius (040)
Π: Codex Petropolitanus (New Testament) (041)
Φ: Codex Beratinus (043)
Ψ: Codex Athous Lavrensis (044)
Ω: Codex Athous Dionysiou (045)
0189: Uncial 0189
Other Uncials

Vetus Latina (Old Latin) Uncials (lower-case letters)

it: with superscripts:

^{a}: Codex Vercellensis
^{b}: Codex Veronensis
^{e}: Codex Palatinus
ff^{1}: Codex Corbeiensis I
ff^{2}: Codex Corbeiensis II
g^{1}: Codex Sangermanensis I
^{j}: Codex Purpureus Sarzanensis
^{k}: Codex Bobiensis

Other important manuscripts and sources

Lectionaries
See List of New Testament lectionaries
ℓ 185: Lectionary 185
ℓ 249: Lectionary 249
Papyri
See List of New Testament papyri
𝔓^{45}: Papyrus 45 (P. Chester Beatty I)
𝔓^{66}: Papyrus 66
Greek Miniscules
See Lists of New Testament minuscules (no leading 0)
33: Minuscule 33
2344: Minuscule 2344
The Diatessaron gospel harmony
Latin Vulgate manuscripts (capital letters)
vg^{A}: Codex Amiatinus
vg^{Σ}: Codex Sangallensis 1395
vg^{F}: Codex Fuldensis
gig: Codex Gigas (Old Latin in Acts and Revelation)
Church Fathers are cited when relevant
Ju: Justin Martyr
Or: Origen
Dion: Dionysius of Alexandria
Tert: Tertullian

Printed New Testaments - critical and eclectic texts

Latin and Greek Majority texts
E: Erasmus, Novum Instrumentum omne (1516)
ς: The Textus Receptus (so-called) of Robert Estienne (1550)
Beza's Greek and Latin New Testament (1565 to 1611)
M: John Mill, Novum Testamentum Graecum, etc. (1707)
Bengel, Novum Testamentum Graecum (1734)
Wettstein, Novum Testamentum Graecum, etc. (1751)
Ma: Matthaei, Novum Testamentum Graecum, etc. (1803)
Griesbach, Novum Testamentum Graece, etc. (1809 to 1823)
L: Lloyd, Novum Testamentum Graecum (1828, 1836)
Ln: Lachmann, Novum Testamentum Graece et Latine (Greek and Latin, 1842, 1850)
Scr: Scrivener's Greek New Testaments (1877 to 1894)
𝔚: Wordsworth-White, Nouum Testamentum Domini nostri Jesu Christi latine (Latin, 1889)
vS: von Soden, Die Schriften des neuen Testaments, etc. (1902 to 1910)
Farstad and Hodges, The Greek New Testament According to the Majority Text with Apparatus (1982)
Modern Greek NTs with substantially Alexandrian texts
𝔗 or T8th: Tischendorf, Editio Octava Critica Maior (1864 to 1894)
WH: Westcott and Hort, The New Testament in the Original Greek (1881)
Weiss, Das Neue Testament (1894)
NA: Novum Testamentum Graece, Nestle–Aland, NA28 is latest (1898-)
UBS: United Bible Societies, Greek New Testament, UBS5 is latest (1966-)
ECM: Editio Critica Maior, updates to Tischendorf's 8th edition (1997-) (in progress)

== Textual variants ==
1 Textual variants in 1 Timothy 1

1 Timothy 1:16

Ιησους (Jesus) – F G 1739 1881
Χριστος Ιησους (Christ Jesus) – A D* H Ψ 0262^{vid} 33 104 326 365 629 1175 lat
Ιησους Χριστος (Jesus Christ) – א D^{2} Byz it^{ar} vg^{mss} syr
Ιησους ο Χριστος (Jesus the Christ) – 614

1 Textual variants in 1 Timothy 2

1 Timothy 2:7

αληθειαν λεγω (I am telling the truth) – א^{2} A D* F G P Ψ 075 0150 6 81 104 263 330 424^{c} 451 459 629 1175 1505 1739 1881 1912 2492 Lect^{mss} lat syr cop eth Ambrosiaster Ambrose Chrysostom John^{Dam}
αληθειαν λεγω εγω (I am telling the truth) – 2495
αληθειαν λεγω Χριστος (I am telling the truth of Christ) – 436
αληθειαν λεγω εν Χριστω (I am telling the truth in Christ) – א* D^{2} H K L 33^{vid} 88 181 256 326 365 424* 614 630 1241 1573 1852 1877 2127 Byz Lect^{mss} it^{ar} vg^{mss} goth arm slav Theodoret Euthalius
αληθειαν λεγω εν Χριστω Ιησου (I am telling the truth in Christ Jesus) – 1319

3 Textual variants in 1 Timothy 3

1 Timothy 3:1

ανθρωπινος (human or of a man) – D* it^{b,d,g,m,mon} Ambrosiaster Jerome^{mss} Augustine Speculum
πιστος (faithful) – rell

1 Timothy 3:14

προς σε (to you) – omitted by F G 6 1739 1881 cop^{sa}

1 Timothy 3:16

ομολογουμεν ως (just as we are professing) – D* 1175
ομολογουμενως (admittedly) – rell

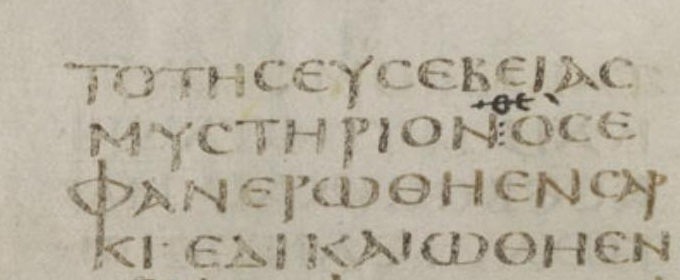
1 Timothy 3:16 in Codex Sinaiticus (א) from 330-360 AD

1 Timothy 3:16

ος εφανερωθη (he who was manifested) – א* A* C* F G 33 365 442 1175 2127 ℓ^{60} ℓ^{599} syr goth eth Origen^{lat} Didymus Epiphanius Jerome Cyril Liberatus
ο εφανερωθη (which was manifested) – D* it vg
ω εφανερωθη (which was made manifest) – 061
Θ̅Ϲ̅ εφανερωθη or θεος εφανερωθη (God was manifested) – א^{c} A^{c} C^{c} D^{c} K L P Ψ 075 0150 6 81 104 181 263 326 330 424 436 451 459 614 629 630 1241 1319 1573 1739 1852 1877 1881 1912 1962 1984 1985 2200 2492 2495 Byz Lect^{mss} slav Gregory Chrysostom Theodoret Euthalius Theodore of Mopsuestia
ο θεος εφανερωθη (the God was manifested) – 88
ος θεος εφανερωθη (the God who was manifested) – 256 ℓ^{597}

1 Textual variants in 1 Timothy 4

1 Timothy 4:10

αγωνιζομεθα – א* A C F^{gr} G^{gr} K Ψ 33 88 104 326 442 915 1175
ονειδιζομεθα – א^{c} D L (P ονειδιζωμεθα) 81 181 330 436 451 614 629 630 1241 1739 1877 Byz Lect
ωνειδιζομεθα – 1881 1985

3 Textual variants in 1 Timothy 5

1 Timothy 5:5

θεον (God) – C F G P Ψ 048 lat syr cop
τον θεον (of God) – א^{2} A D^{2} 1739 1881 Byz
τον κυριον (of the LORD) – D* 81 vg^{mss}
κυριον (the LORD) – א*

1 Timothy 5:19

εκτος ει μη επι δυο η τριων μαρτυρων (except from two or three witnesses) – omitted by it^{b} Ambrosiaster Jerome^{mss} Pelagius

1 Timothy 5:21

Χριστου Ιησου – א A D* G 33 81 104 365 629 latt cop Clement
Ιησου Χριστου – F Ψ 630 1175 1739 1881
κυριου Ιησου Χριστου – D^{2} Byz syr

2 Textual variants in 1 Timothy 6

1 Timothy 6:7

οτι – א A F G 048 061 33 81 1739 1881
δηλον οτι – א^{c} D^{c} K L P Ψ 104 181 326 330 436 451 614 629 630 1241 1877 1962 1984 1985 2127 2492 2495 Byz
αλητες οτι – D*

1 Timothy 6:21

αμην (Amen) – א^{2} D^{2} K L P Ψ 075 0150 6 88 104 181 256 263 326 330 365 424 436 451 459 614 629 630 1175 1241 1319 1573 1739^{c} 1852 1877 1912 1962 1984 1985 2127 2200 2492 2495 Byz Lect it^{mss} vg^{mss} syr cop^{bo} eth slav Ambrosiaster Theodoret John^{Dam}
omitted – א* A D* F G 33 81 1311 1739* 1881 it^{mss} vg^{mss} cop^{sa} Chrysostom Pelagius Euthalius^{mss} Speculum

== See also ==
- An Historical Account of Two Notable Corruptions of Scripture
- Alexandrian text-type
- Biblical inerrancy
- Byzantine text-type
- Caesarean text-type
- Categories of New Testament manuscripts
- Comparison of codices Sinaiticus and Vaticanus
- List of New Testament verses not included in modern English translations
- Textual variants in the New Testament
- Western text-type
