= Nicodemite =

Person seen as professing orthodoxy to mask actual belief

A Nicodemite (/ˌnɪkəˈdiːmaɪt/) is a person suspected of publicly misrepresenting their religious faith to conceal their true beliefs. The term is sometimes defined as referring to a Protestant who lived in a Catholic country and escaped persecution by concealing their Protestantism.

The word is normally a term of disparagement. Introduced into 16th-century religious discourse, it persisted in use into the 18th century and beyond. Originally employed mostly by Protestants, it was usually applied to persons of publicly conservative religious position and practice who were thought to be secretly humanistic or reformed.

In England during the 17th and 18th centuries the term was often applied to those suspected of secret Socinian, Arian, or Deist beliefs.

== Origin ==
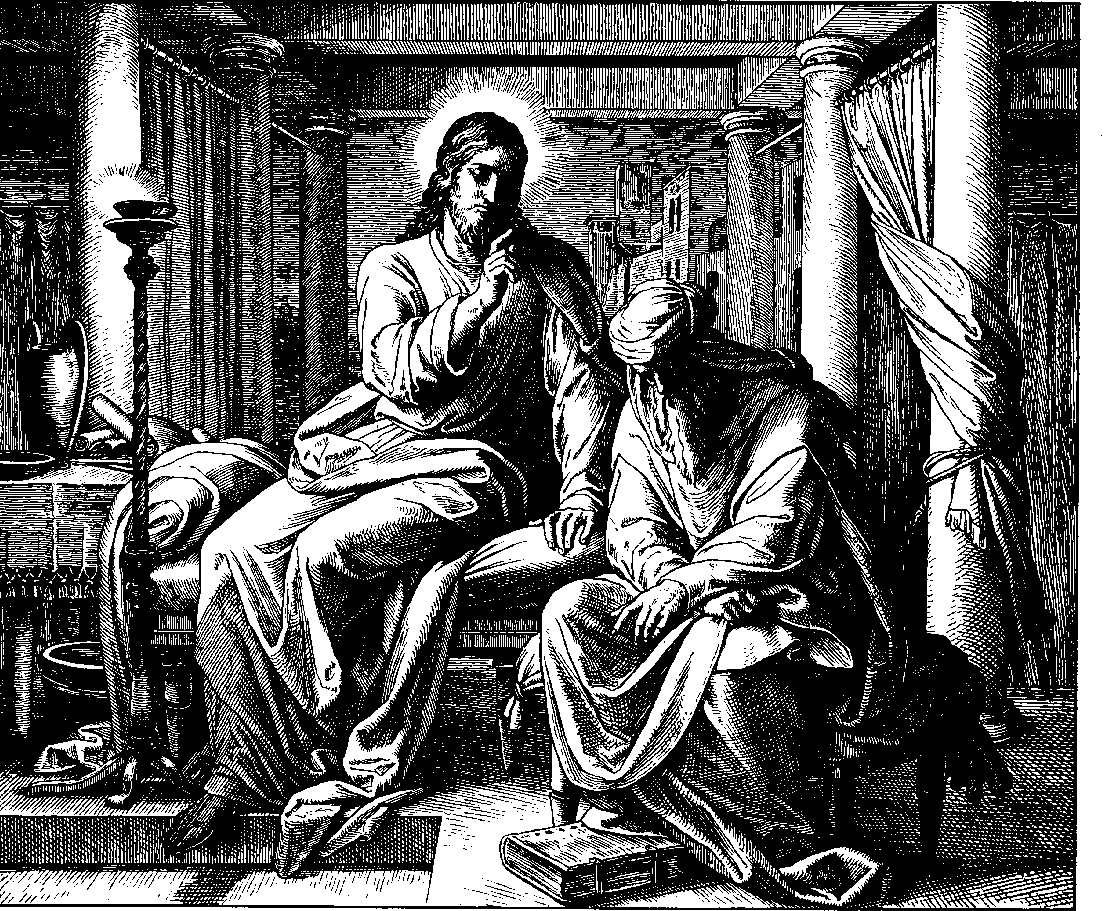
Nicodemus meeting Jesus secretly at night

The term was apparently introduced by John Calvin (1509–1564) in 1544 in his Excuse à messieurs les Nicodemites. Since the French monarchy had increased its prosecution of heresy with the Edict of Fontainebleau (1540), it had become more dangerous to profess dissident beliefs publicly, so refuge was sought in emulating the disciple Nicodemus.

According to the Gospel of John (John 3, John 3:1-2), Nicodemus was a Pharisee and member of the Sanhedrin. Although outwardly remaining a pious Jew, he came to Jesus secretly by night to receive instruction.

There was a man of the Pharisees, named Nicodemus, a ruler of the Jews: The same came to Jesus by night, and said unto him, Rabbi, we know that thou art a teacher come from God: for no man can do these miracles that thou doest, except God be with him.

== Notable suspected Nicodemites ==
- Edward Courtenay, 1st Earl of Devon (c.1527–1556), courtier of Mary I of England
- Thomas Cranmer (1489–1556), first Anglican Archbishop of Canterbury under Henry VIII of England
- Michelangelo (1475–1564), who sculpted a portrait of himself as Nicodemus in his Florentine Pietà
- Isaac Newton (1643–1727), eminent scientist and theologian
- Reginald, Cardinal Pole (1500–1558), last Catholic Archbishop of Canterbury

== See also ==
- Crypto-Christianity
- Crypto-Islam
- Crypto-Judaism
- Crypto-Protestantism
- Crypto-Papism
- An Historical Account of Two Notable Corruptions of Scripture
- Marrano
- Morisco
- Religious views of Isaac Newton
- Taqiyya

== Bibliography ==
- Eire, Carlos M. N. "Prelude to Sedition: Calvin's Attack on Nicodemism and Religious Compromise". Archiv für Reformationsgeschichte 76:120-45.
- Eire, Carlos M. N. "Calvin and Nicodemism: A Reappraisal". Sixteenth Century Journal X:1, 1979.
- Ginzburg, Carlo. "Il nicodemismo. Simulazione e dissimulazione religiosa nell'Europa del Cinquecento", Einaudi, Torino 1970.
- Livingstone, E. A. "Nicodemism". In The Concise Oxford Dictionary of the Christian Church. Oxford University Press, Oxford, 2000. Entry available here.
- Magalhães, Anderson. All’ombra dell’eresia: Bernardo Tasso e le donne della Bibbia in Francia e in Italia, in Le donne della Bibbia, la Bibbia delle donne. Teatro, letteratura e vita, Atti del XV Convegno Internazionale di Studio organizzato dal Gruppo di Studio sul Cinquecento francese, Verona, 16-19 ottobre 2009, a cura di R. Gorris Camos, Fasano, Schena, 2012, pp. 159–218.
- Overell, M. Anne Italian Reform and English Reformations, c.1535–c.1585. The Open University, UK. 2008. Excerpt available online.
- Overell, Anne. "A Nicodemite in England and Italy: Edward Courtenay, 1548-46". In John Foxe at Home and Abroad. D. M. Loades, ed. Ashgate Publishing, Farnham, Surrey, UK, 2004.
- Pettegree, Andrew. "Nicodemism and the English Reformation" in Marian Protestantism: Six Studies, St. Andrews Studies in Reformation History. Aldershot, 1996, pp. 86–117.
- Shrimplin-Evangelidis, Valerie. Michelangelo and Nicodemism: The Florentine Pietà. College Art Association, 1989.
- Snobelen, Stephen D. "Isaac Newton, heretic: the strategies of a Nicodemite." The British Journal for the History of Science, 32:4:381-419. Cambridge University Press, 1999.
