= Priest of Nature =

2017 book by Rob Iliffe

- Cover
- Author: Rob Iliffe
- Language: English
- Subject: History of science; Isaac Newton
- Publisher: Oxford University Press
- Publication date: 2017
- Publication place: United States and United Kingdom
- Pages: 536
- ISBN: 978-0-19-999535-6
- OCLC: 855909939
- Dewey Decimal: 230.044092
- LC Class: B1299.N34
- Website: global.oup.com/academic/product/priest-of-nature-9780199995356
- All identifiers refer to the hardcover edition, published: 10 July 2017, unless otherwise noted

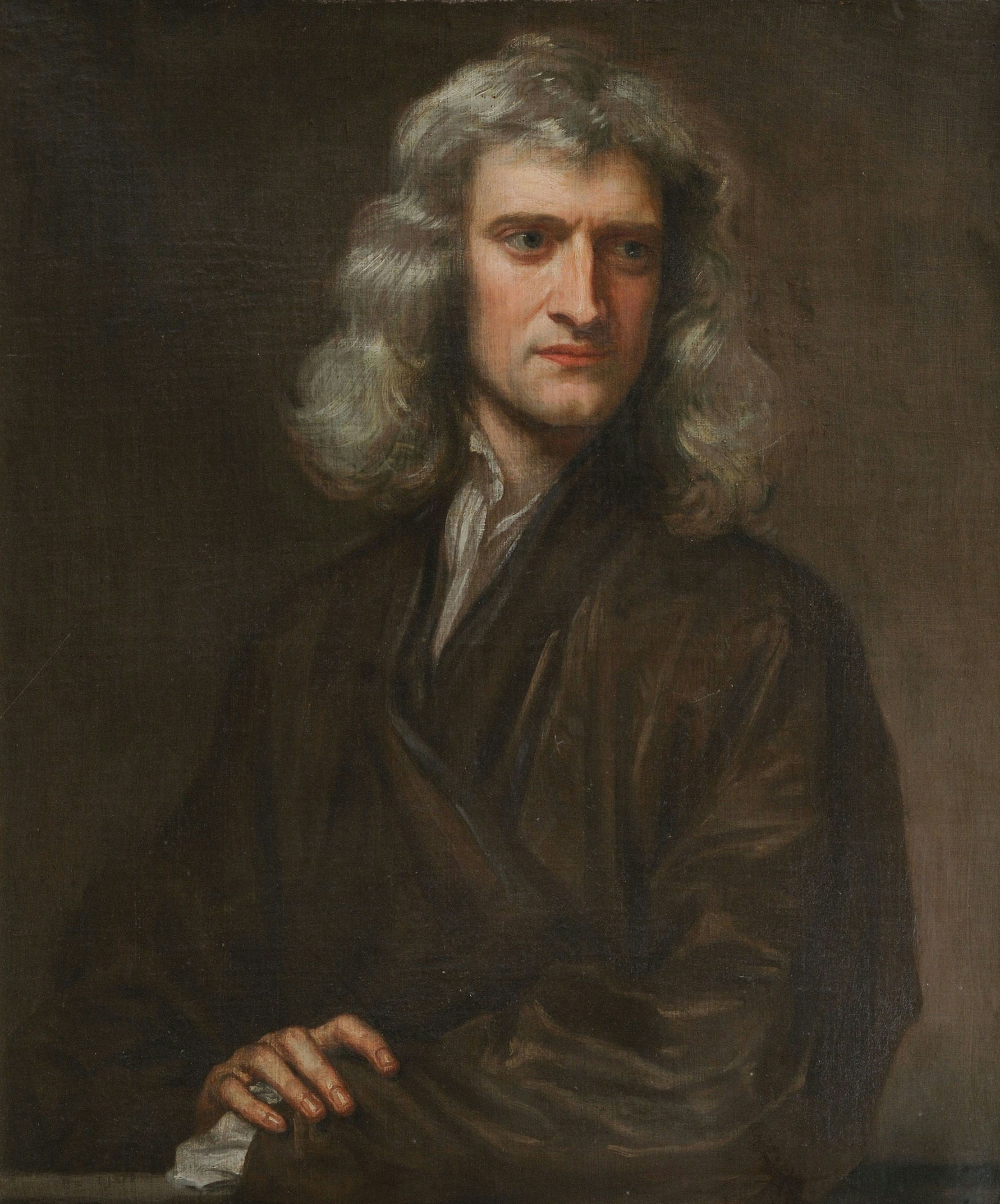
Portrait of Newton from 1689

Priest of Nature: The Religious Worlds of Isaac Newton is a 2017 book by science historian Rob Iliffe on the religious views of Isaac Newton.

== Background ==
Rob Iliffe is Professor of the History of Science, Linacre College, University of Oxford. For nearly twenty years leading up to the book's publication, he directed The Newton Project – an online repository of Isaac Newton's manuscripts with editorial commentary. Previously, Iliffe wrote another book on Newton, Newton: A Very Short Introduction, that was published by Oxford University Press in 2007.

== Themes ==
Newton had a lifelong interest in theology, especially prophecies in the Book of Revelation. The book shows that in one of the Philosophiæ Naturalis Principia Mathematica's appendices, General Scholium, Newton argued that the "divine mode of being" was unknown, an argument that threatened the traditional theological concept of incarnation. Newton never believed in the Trinity, a heretical view that played a large role in his religious writings being only recently published after nearly 300 years.

== Reception ==
The book was met with critical acclaim. The book was reviewed by David Brion Davis, Graham Farmelo, Peter Harrison, Eamon Duffy, William Gibson, Floris Cohen, and Guy Stroumsa, along with many others, including reviews in newspapers and magazines, literary publications, academic journals, and theological journals. The book's review in Publishers Weekly stated that "Iliffe skillfully chronicles Newton's life" and that he "adroitly illustrates that, from the beginning, Newton displayed deep interests in scriptural interpretation, the history of the early Church, and the idea of prophecy". The review closes by stating: "Iliffe's fascinating study provides an absorbing glimpse into Newton's work and early modern culture". In his review of the book, Peter Harrison stated that the book "presents what is surely the definitive account of Newton's religious world view" and went on to write: "It is a remarkable work of painstaking scholarship, engagingly written, and packed with new insights into the man and his milieu". Among other acclamations, the book made the best sellers list for the Library Journal in October 2017 and was listed as one of "The Top 75 Community College Titles" by Choice Reviews in December of the same year.

== Release details ==
- Iliffe, Rob (10 July 2017). Priest of Nature: The Religious Worlds of Isaac Newton. Oxford; New York: Oxford University Press. ISBN 978-0-19-999535-6. OCLC 855909939Hardcover
- Iliffe, Rob (10 July 2017). Priest of Nature: The Religious Worlds of Isaac Newton. Oxford; New York: Oxford University Press. ISBN 978-0-19-936385-8. OCLC 900564080Digital
- Iliffe, Rob (1 March 2019). Priest of Nature: The Religious Worlds of Isaac Newton. Oxford; New York: Oxford University Press. ISBN 978-0-19-093159-9. OCLC 855909939Paperback
