= Snobelen =

Snobelen is a surname. Notable people with this surname include:

- John Snobelen (born 1954), Canadian politician
- Stephen Snobelen, Canadian historian
