= Uncial 0259 =

- New Testament manuscript
- Text: 1 Timothy 1:4-5.6-7
- Date: 7th century
- Script: Greek
- Now at: Berlin State Museums
- Size: 12 x 10 cm
- Type: mixed
- Category: III

Uncial 0259 (in the Gregory-Aland numbering), is a Greek uncial manuscript of the New Testament. Paleographically it has been assigned to the 7th century. The codex contains some parts of the 1 Timothy 1:4-5.6-7, on 2 parchment leaves (12 cm by 10 cm). Written in one column per page, 11 lines per page, in uncial letters.

== Text ==
Recto χουσιν μαλλον η οικονομιαν θ̅υ̅ την εν πισ[τει] το δε τελ[ος της] παραγ[γελιας ες] τιν αγ[απη εκ κα] θα[ρας ]. . . . . . . .	Verso νες αστοχησαν της εξετραπτησαν εις ματαιολογιαν θ[ε]λ[ο]ντες ειναι [νομοδ]ιδασκαλοι [μη νοσουν]της μη [τε α λεγουσιν] μη [τε ]. . . . . . . .

[transcribed by Kurt Treu]

According to Elliott, Treu wrongly deciphered reading οικονομιαν, according to him the manuscript reads οικοδομη.

The nomina sacra contracted. It has two singular readings:

εξετραπτησαν instead of εξετραπησαν
νοσουντης instead of νοουντης.

The text-type of this codex is mixed. Aland placed it in Category III.

== History ==
Currently it is dated by the INTF to the 7th century.

Currently the codex is housed at the Berlin State Museums (P. 3605) in Berlin.

== See also ==
- List of New Testament uncials
- Textual criticism
- Uncial 0262
