= Stephen Snobelen =

Canadian historian

Stephen Snobelen is a professor of the history of science and technology at the University of King's College in Halifax, Nova Scotia. His current teaching and research interests are History of science (Early Modern and nineteenth century); Isaac Newton and Newton's theological writings and prophetic writings, Science and religion; The popularization of science; Radical theology in the Early Modern period; and Millenarianism.

He was featured in a BBC documentary on this subject matter, titled Newton: The Dark Heretic. Snobelen is a founding member of the Newton Project, UK and director of the Newton Project, Canada.

In 2002, Snobelen was awarded the John Templeton Foundation Science and Religion Course Award for his two courses at University of King's College, Science and Religion: Historical Perspectives and Science and Religion: Contemporary Perspectives.
