= The Chronology of Ancient Kingdoms Amended =

1728 history book by Isaac Newton

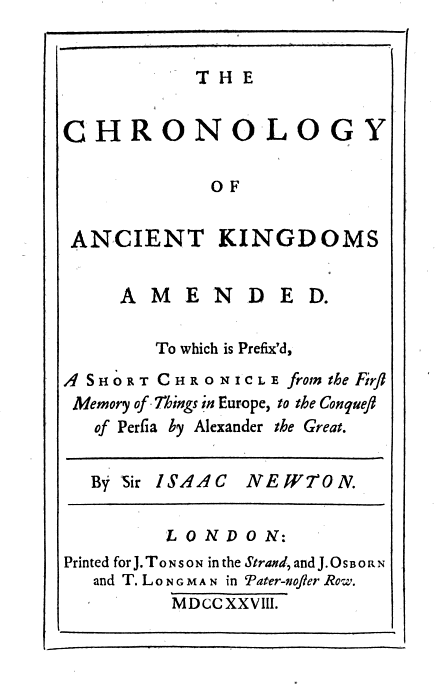
- Title page, first edition
- Author: Isaac Newton
- Language: English
- Subject: Chronology
- Genre: Non-fiction
- Publisher: J. Tonson, J. Osborn, & T. Longman
- Publication date: 1728
- Publication place: England
- Media type: Print
- OCLC: 3834370

The Chronology of Ancient Kingdoms Amended is a work of historical chronology written by Sir Isaac Newton, first published posthumously in 1728. Since then it has been republished. The work, some 87,000 words, represents one of Newton's forays into the topic of chronology, detailing the rise and history of various ancient kingdoms throughout antiquity.

== Contents ==
The treatise is composed of eight primary sections. First is an introductory letter to Caroline of Ansbach, the Queen of England, by John Conduitt MP, the husband of Newton's niece, followed by a short advertisement. After this is found a section entitled "A Short Chronicle" which serves as a brief historical list of events listed in chronological order, beginning with the earliest listed date of 1125 BC and the most recent listed at 331 BC. The majority of the treatise, however, is in the form of six chapters that explore the history of specific civilizations. These chapters are titled:

- Chap. I. Of the Chronology of the First Ages of the Greeks.
- Chap. II. Of the Empire of Egypt.
- Chap. III. Of the Assyrian Empire.
- Chap. IV. Of the two Contemporary Empires of the Babylonians and Medes.
- Chap. V. A Description of the Temple of Solomon.
- Chap. VI. Of the Empire of the Persians.

According to John Conduitt's introductory letter, The Chronology of Ancient Kingdoms Amended was Isaac Newton's last personally revised work before his death but had actually been written much earlier. Some of its subject material and contents have led many people to categorize this work as one of Isaac Newton's occult studies.

The work treats figures from Greek mythology, such as the centaur Chiron and the Argonauts, as historical fact.
