= Uncial 0262 =

- New Testament manuscript
- Text: 1 Timothy 1:15-16
- Date: 7th century
- Script: Greek
- Now at: Berlin State Museums
- Size: 9.5 x 13 cm
- Type: mixed
- Category: III

Uncial 0262 (in the Gregory-Aland numbering), is a Greek uncial manuscript of the New Testament. Paleographically it has been assigned to the 7th century.

== Description ==
The codex contains small part of the First Epistle to Timothy 1:15-16, on one parchment leaf (9,5 cm by 13 cm). It is survived in a fragmentary condition. Probably it was written in two columns per page, 6 lines per page, in uncial letters.

Currently it is dated by the INTF to the 7th century.

It was examined by Kurt Treu and Horseley.

== Text ==
Col I

[πισ]τος ω λλοκος
και πασης αποτοχης
αξιος οτι Χριστος Ις
[ηλθεν] ει[ς τ]ων
[κοσμον αμα]ρ
[τωλους σωσαι]

Col II

ομ προτος ιμιν
εγω, αλα δια τατο
ελεηθην; ινα εν ε
μοι προτω ενδι[ξη]
τε Χς; [Ις] την [απα]
[σαν μακροθυμιαν]

[transcribed by Kurt Treu]

The original orthography is heavily phoneticized. Treu provides the following transcription orthography normalized.

Πιστος ο λογος και πασης αποδοχης αξιος, οτι Χριστος ηλθεν εις τον κοσμον αμαρτολους σωσαι ων πρωτος ειμι εγς αλλα δια τουτο ηλεηθην, ινα εν εμοι πρωτω ενδειξηται Χριστος Ιησους την απασαν μακροθυμιαν.

The text-type of this codex is mixed. Aland placed it in Category III.

== Location ==
Currently the codex is housed at the Berlin State Museums (P. 13977) in Berlin.

== See also ==
- List of New Testament uncials
- Textual criticism
- Uncial 0259
