= Turba Philosophorum =

10th-century alchemical text

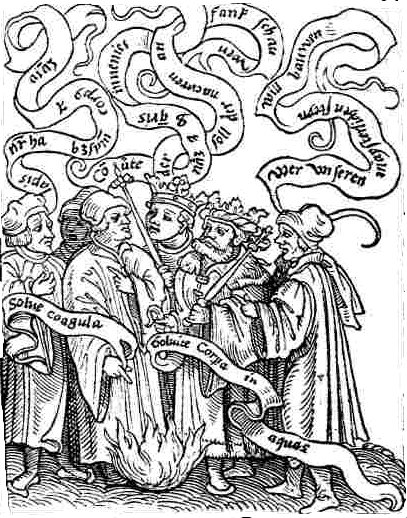
Turba Philosophorum

The Turba Philosophorum, also known as Assembly of the Philosophers, is one of the oldest European alchemy texts, translated from Arabic, like the Picatrix. It is considered to have been written c. 900 A.D.

== The text ==
To quote Plessner, "the Turba Philosophorum, written c. 900 A. D., is a well planned and, from a literary point of view, a most remarkable attempt to put Greek alchemy into the Arabic language and to adapt it to Islamic science". Nine philosophers take part in a discussion, being, once the text has been transcribed back to the original Arabic, Anaximander, Anaximenes, Anaxagoras, Empedocles, Archelaus, Leucippus, Ecphantus, Pythagoras and Xenophanes. The statements of the philosophers, whilst usually different from the known beliefs of the pre-Socratics, are usually recognisable as outgrowths of Greek philosophy. They discuss matter, how it acts, and relate this to cosmology, with three theses presented by Xenophanes in his closing speech, being, again from Plessner:

"1) The creator of the World is Allah, the God of Islam; 2) The world is of a uniform nature; 3) All creatures of the upper as well as of the lower world are composed of all four elements."

== Dating ==
Plessner argues that the Turba was written around 900 AD, based on the following reasoning. The earliest text known to draw on the Turba is the Kitab al-Ma al-waraqi by Ibn Umail, who died in the middle of the tenth century. In turn, an earlier date can be ruled out by the appearance in the text of poison hidden in the body of a woman, which kills a dragon by her embrace. The Hindu myth of the ‘poison-maiden’ who kills men by her embrace arrived in Arabic literature around the first half of the 9th century, with the translation into Arabic of the ‘Poison Book’ ascribed to the Indian Chanakya.

== Later printed sources ==
In print, the title occurs in the Auriferae artis, quam chemiam vocant, antiquissimi authores, sive Turba philosophorum of 1572, and later works. A page from the Newton Project references a work of essentially the same title, but of 1610. There the Turba is described as "an anthology of pre-medieval alchemical texts published in Latin translation (from Arabic)". Another source is given as the 1659-61 edition of Lazarus Zetzner's Theatrum Chemicum.
