= First Epistle to Timothy =

Book of the New Testament

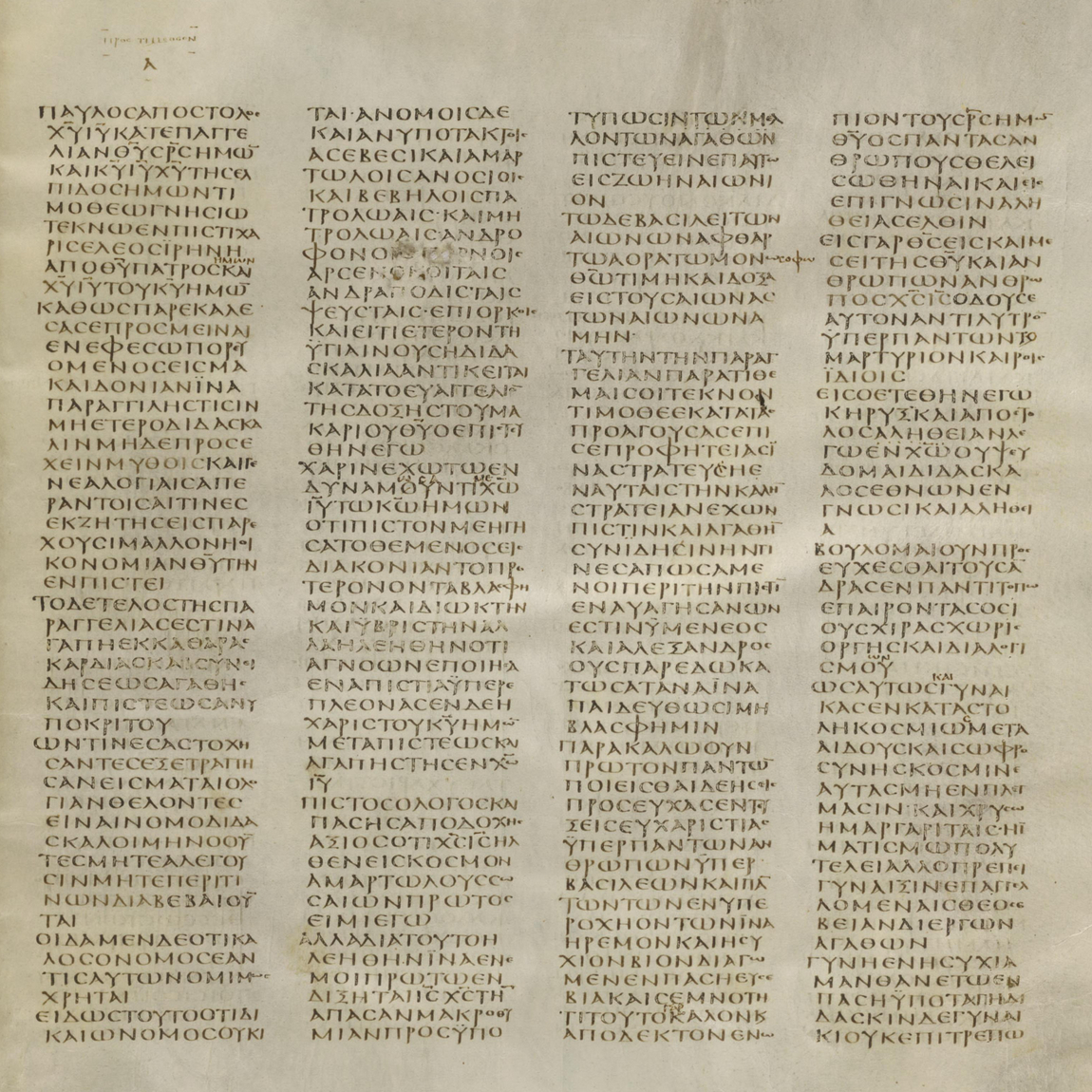
1 Timothy 1:1–2:12 in Codex Sinaiticus (c. AD 350)

The First Epistle to Timothy (Note: The book is sometimes called the First Letter of Paul to Timothy, or simply 1 Timothy. It is most commonly abbreviated as "1 Tim.") is one of three letters in the New Testament of the Bible often grouped together as the pastoral epistles, along with Second Timothy and Titus. The letter is traditionally attributed to the Apostle Paul and consists mainly of counsels to his younger colleague and delegate Timothy regarding his ministry in Ephesus (1:3). These counsels include instructions on the organization of the Church and the responsibilities resting on certain groups of leaders therein as well as exhortations to faithfulness in maintaining the truth amid surrounding errors.

Most modern scholars consider the pastoral epistles to have been written after Paul's death, although "a small and declining number of scholars still argue for Pauline authorship".

== Authorship ==
The authorship of First Timothy was traditionally attributed to the Apostle Paul, although in pre-Nicene Christianity this attribution was open to dispute. He is named as the author of the letter in the text (1:1). Nineteenth- and twentieth-century scholarship questioned the authenticity of the letter, with many scholars suggesting that First Timothy, along with Second Timothy and Titus, are not the work of Paul, but of an unidentified Christian writing some time in the late-first to mid-second centuries. Most scholars now affirm this view.

As evidence for this perspective, they put forward that the pastoral epistles contain 306 words that Paul does not use in his unquestioned letters, that their style of writing is different from that of his unquestioned letters, that they reflect conditions and a church organization supposedly not current in Paul's day, and that they do not appear in early lists of his canonical works. Modern scholars who support Pauline authorship nevertheless stress their importance regarding the question of authenticity: I. H. Marshall and P. H. Towner wrote that "the key witness is Polycarp, where there is a high probability that 1 and 2 Tim were known to him". Similarly M. W. Holmes argued that it is "virtually certain or highly probable" that Polycarp used 1 and 2 Timothy. Scholars Robert Grant, Ian Howard Marshall, and Hans von Campenhausen believe that Polycarp was the actual author of First Timothy, which would date its composition to c. 140.

Marcion, later excommunicated for heresy, formed an early canon of scripture c. 140 around the Gospel of Luke and ten of the canonical Pauline epistles excluding 1–2 Timothy and Titus. The reasons for these exclusions are unknown, and so speculation abounds, including the hypotheses that he knew of them, but regarded them as inauthentic. Proponents of Pauline authorship argue that he had theological grounds for rejecting the pastorals, namely their teaching about the goodness of creation (cf. 1 Timothy 4:1 ff.). The question remains whether Marcion knew these three letters and rejected them as Tertullian says, since in 1 Timothy 6:20 "false opposing arguments" are referred to, with the word for "opposing arguments" being "antithesis", the name of Marcion's work, and so a subtle hint of Marcion's heresy. However, the structure of the Church presupposed is less developed than the one Ignatius of Antioch (who wrote c. 110) presupposes, as well as the fact that not only is "antithesis" itself a Greek word which simply means "opposing arguments" but as it has been noted, the attack on the heretics is not central to the three letters.

Late in the 2nd century there are a number of quotations from all three pastoral epistles in Irenaeus' work Against Heresies. Irenaeus also makes explicit mention of Timothy in his book and ascribes it as being written by Paul The Muratorian Canon (c. 170–180) lists the books of the New Testament and ascribes all three pastoral epistles to Paul. Eusebius (c. 330) calls it, along with the other thirteen canonical Pauline epistles, "undisputed". Exceptions to this positive witness include Tatian, as well as the gnostic Basilides. Possible earlier allusions are found in the letters from Clement of Rome to the Corinthians (c. 95), Ignatius to the Ephesians (c. 110) and Polycarp to the Philippians (c. 130), although it is difficult to determine the nature of any such literary relationships.

== Date ==
Modern scholars generally place its composition some time in the late 1st century or first half of the 2nd century AD, with a wide margin of uncertainty. The term Gnosis ("knowledge") itself occurs in 1 Timothy 6:20. If the parallels between 1 Timothy and Polycarp's epistle are understood as a literary dependence by the latter on the former, as is generally accepted, this would point to a terminus ante quem (cut-off date) before Polycarp wrote his epistle. Likewise, there are a series of verbal agreements between Ignatius and 1 Timothy which cluster around a 14 verse section in 1 Timothy 1. (Note: Ignatius' Letter to the Magnesians chapter 11, shares the phrase "Jesus, who is our hope" with 1 Timothy 1:1. Ignatius' Letter to Polycarp chapter 3 shares the phrase "teach strange doctrines" with 1 Timothy 1:3 as a description of theological opponents. Ignatius' Letter to the Ephesians chapter 14 has the phrase "faith and love toward Christ Jesus," which parallels "faith and love which are in Christ Jesus" from 1 Timothy 1:14. This same passage of Ignatius goes on to say "the end is love," which parallels 1 Timothy 1:5, "The end of our instruction is love.") If these parallels between Ignatius and 1 Timothy represent a literary dependence by Ignatius, this would move the date of 1 Timothy earlier. However, Irenaeus (writing c. 180 AD) is the earliest author to clearly and unequivocally describe the letter to Timothy and attribute it to Paul.

== Early surviving manuscripts ==
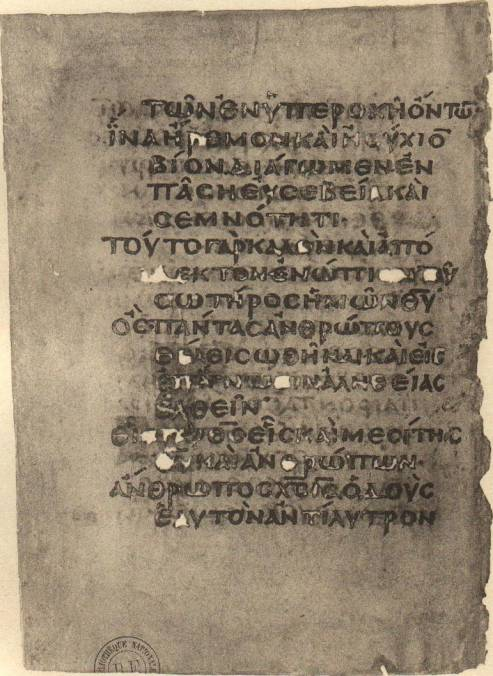
Fragments showing 1 Timothy 2:2–6 on Codex Coislinianus, from ca. AD 550.

The original Koine Greek manuscript has been lost, and the text of surviving copies varies.

The earliest known writing of 1 Timothy has been found on Oxyrhynchus Papyrus 5259, designated P133, in 2017. It comes from a leaf of a codex which is dated to the 4th century (330–360). Other early manuscripts containing some or all of the text of this book are:

- Codex Alexandrinus (400–440)
- Codex Ephraemi Rescriptus (c. 450)
- Codex Freerianus (c. 450)
- Uncial 061 (c. 450)
- Codex Claromontanus (c. 550)
- Codex Coislinianus (c. 550)
- Uncial 0262 (7th century)

== Content ==
=== Summary ===
The epistle opens by stating that it was written by Paul, to Timothy. Paul reminds Timothy that he has asked Timothy to stay in Ephesus and prevent false teaching of the law by others. Paul says that law is to be applied to sinners like rebels, murderers, and the sexually immoral. The list of lawbreakers includes the Greek word ἀρσενοκοίτης, which is sometimes translated to mean "homosexual men" although there is considerable debate on the word's meaning.

The epistle details the roles of men and women in its second chapter, particularly the verse 1 Timothy 2:12. In the NIV translation this verse reads:

I do not permit a woman to teach or to have authority over a man; she must be silent.

The epistle justifies this by saying that Adam was formed before Eve, and that Eve was tricked by the serpent.

Leaders of the church are to conduct themselves in a manner worthy of respect, avoiding overindulgence in wine and managing their affairs well. Timothy is advised to avoid false teachings and focus on the truth.

The author discusses a list of widows to be supported by the church, setting restrictions on the types of women to help: only old widows who never remarry and who prioritize their family are to receive help. Widows younger than sixty have sensual desires that may cause them to remarry.

Slaves should respect their masters, especially if their masters are believers. People should avoid envy and avoid the temptation to focus on becoming rich because "the love of money is the root of all kinds of evil."

In closing, Timothy is told he should continue to "fight the good fight of the faith" by helping others to be virtuous and by running his church well.

=== Outline ===
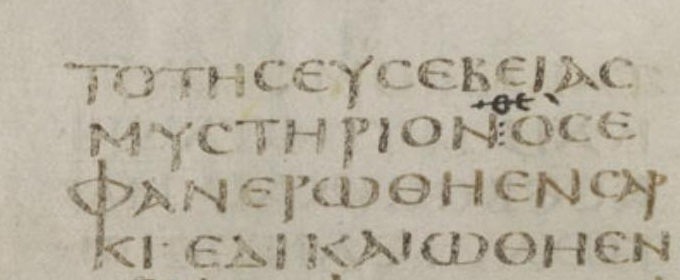
Extract from 1 Timothy 3:16 in the 4th-century Codex Sinaiticus: "Beyond all question, the mystery from which true godliness springs is great: He appeared in the flesh, was vindicated..."

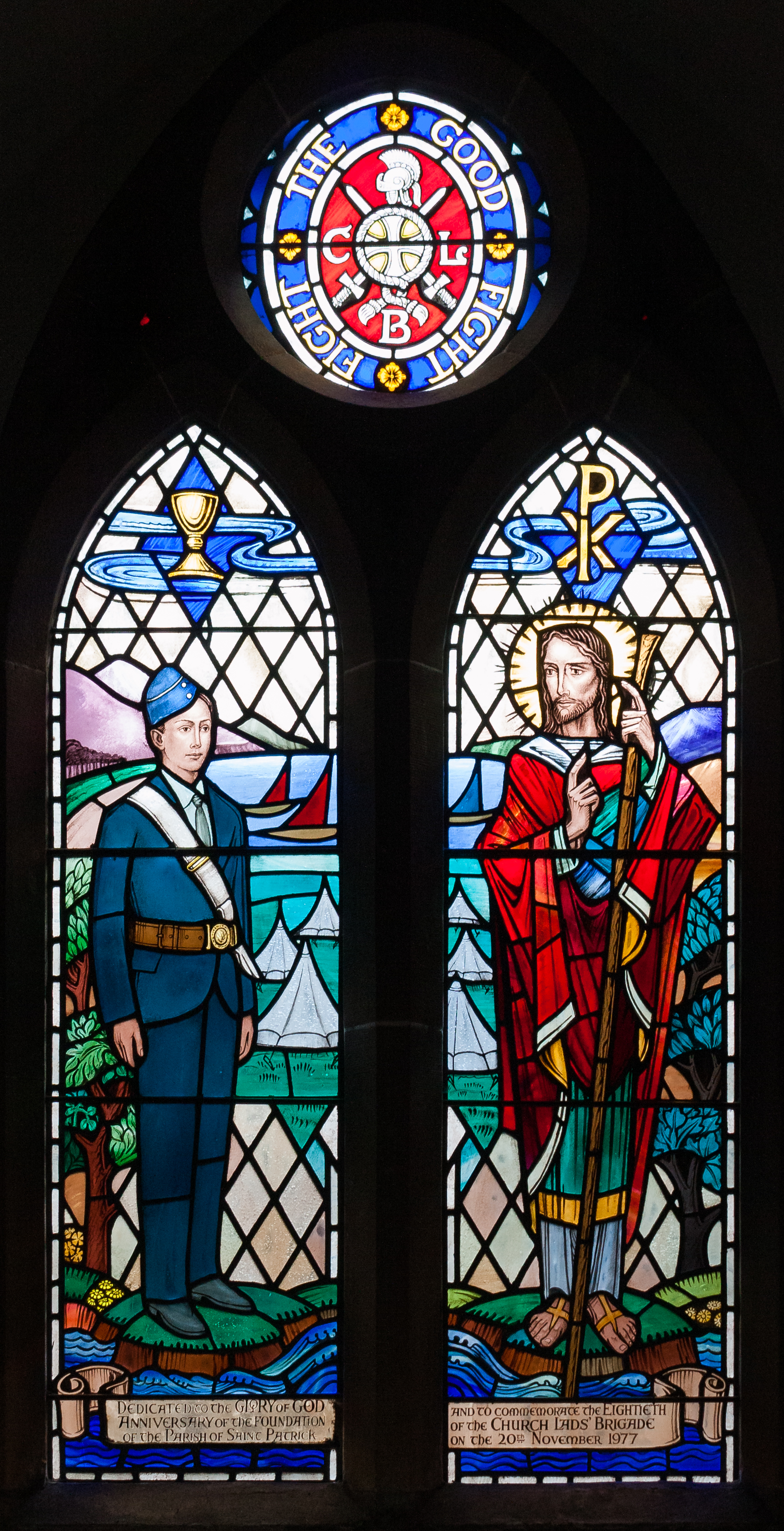
St Patrick's Church, Ballymena, Northern Ireland: stained glass window depicting a Church Lads' Brigade member and Jesus, with "Fight the Good Fight" (1 Tim 6:12) quoted in the round window at top.

1. Salutation (1:1–2)
2. Negative Instructions: Stop the False Teachers (1:3–20)
  1. Warning against False Teachers (1:3–11)
    1. The Charge to Timothy Stated (1:3)
    2. Their Wrong Use of the Law (1:4–7)
    3. The Right Use of the Law (1:8–11)
  2. Paul's Experience of Grace (1:12–17)
  3. The Charge to Timothy Repeated (1:18–20)
3. Positive Instructions: Repair the Church (2:1–6:10)
  1. Restoring the Conduct of the Church (2:1–3:16)
    1. Instructions on Public Worship (2:1–15)
      1. Concerning Prayer (2:1–7)
      2. Concerning the Role of Men and Women (2:8–15)
        1. Men: Pray in a Holy Manner (2:8)
        2. Women: Quiet Conduct (2:9–15)
    2. Instructions on Church Leadership (3:1–13)
      1. Qualifications of Overseers (Elders) (3:1–7)
      2. Qualifications of Deacons (3:8–13)
    3. Summary (3:14–16)
      1. Conduct of the Church (3:14–15)
      2. Hymn to Christ (3:16)
  2. Guarding the Truth in the Church (4:1–16)
    1. In the Face of Apostasy (4:1–5)
    2. Timothy's Personal Responsibilities (4:6–16)
    3. Spiritual Exercises (4:7–9)
  3. Dealing with Groups in the Church (5:1–6:10)
    1. Men and Women, Young and Old (5:1–2)
    2. Widows (5:3–16)
      1. Older Widows (5:3–10)
      2. Younger Widows (5:11–16)
    3. Elders (5:17–25)
      1. The Reward of Elders (5:17–18)
      2. The Reputation of Elders (5:19–20)
        1. The Reputation of Elders Protected (5:19)
        2. The Sins of Elders Publicly Rebuked (5:20)
      3. The Recognition of Prospective Elders (5:21–25)
    4. Slaves (6:1–2)
    5. False Teachers (6:3–10)
4. Personal Instructions: Pursue Godliness (6:11–21)
  1. Fight the Good Fight (6:11–16)
  2. A Final Word to the Wealthy (6:17–19)
  3. Guard What has been Entrusted (6:20–21)

== Music ==
Several composers used lines from the epistle in Christmas cantatas, such as Gottfried Heinrich Stölzel's Kündlich groß ist das gottselige Geheimnis beginning with 1 Timothy 3:16.

== Verses ==
=== 1:17 ===
Jonathan Edwards, a major figure in the First Great Awakening in the United States, identified reading this verse as an important moment in his religious experience, writing "As I read the words, there came into my soul, and was as it were diffused through it, a sense of the glory of the Divine Being; a new sense, quite different from any thing I ever experienced before. Never any words of Scripture seemed to me as those words did... From about that time, I began to have a new kind of apprehensions and ideas of Christ, and the work of redemption, and the glorious way of salvation by him."

=== 2:12 ===
1 Timothy 2:12 has been the source of considerable controversy concerning gender equality. Certain Christian churches such as the Eastern Orthodox Church and Roman Catholic Church use it as a justification to reject the ordination of women. A note on this text in the Ignatius Catholic Study Bible says, "Not an absolute prohibition that applies in all circumstances, but one that excludes women from the teaching ministry exercised by ordained clergymen." The note cites 1 Corinthians 14:34-35 and the 1976 document Inter Insigniores. Some theologians have interpreted this verse to mean that all women should be subordinate to all men, and others to mean women should not teach, pray, or speak in public. Tertullian and Cyprian held that neither virgins nor married women were permitted to baptize, nor could they hold active or teaching roles in Church assembly. John Chrysostom and Ambrosiaster held that such restrictions were applicable in order to maintain divine order.

=== 3:16 ===
In An Historical Account of Two Notable Corruptions of Scripture, published posthumously in 1754, Isaac Newton argues that a small change to early Greek versions of verse 3:16 increased textual support for trinitarianism, a doctrine to which Newton did not subscribe.

=== 4:15-16 ===
^{15} Let this be thy study, these thy employments, so that all may see how well thou doest. ^{16} Two things claim thy attention, thyself and the teaching of the faith; spend thy care on them; so wilt thou and those who listen to thee achieve salvation.

The Second Vatican Council's Decree of the Life and Ministry of Priests (1965) quotes these verses using this Ronald Knox translation in its English language text, and uses them to exhort priests to read the scriptures every day, to "read and hear the word of God, which it is their task to teach others".

== See also ==
- Pseudepigrapha
- Second Epistle to Timothy
- Textual variants in the New Testament § First Epistle to Timothy

== Notes ==
First Epistle to Timothy Pauline Pastoral Epistle
Preceded by Second Thessalonians	New Testament; Books of the Bible	Succeeded by Second Timothy
