= Biblical gloss =

Brief notation

In Biblical studies, a gloss or glossa is an annotation written on margins or within the text of biblical manuscripts or printed editions of the scriptures. With regard to the Hebrew texts, the glosses chiefly contained explanations of purely verbal difficulties of the text; some of these glosses are of importance for the correct reading or understanding of the original Hebrew, while nearly all have contributed to its uniform transmission since the 11th century. Later on, Christian glosses also contained scriptural commentaries; St. Jerome extensively used glosses in the process of translation of the Latin Vulgate Bible.

== Etymology ==
The English word gloss is derived from the Latin glossa, a transcript of the Greek glossa. In classical Greek it means a tongue or language. In the course of time it was used to designate first a word of the text which needed some explanation, and later the explanation or addition itself.

== Explanatory glosses ==
The words which were commonly the subject of explanatory glosses may be reduced to the following five classes:

- foreign words
- provincial dialectical terms
- obsolete words
- technical terms
- words employed in some unusual sense or in some peculiar grammatical form

Where these glosses consisted of a single explanatory word, they were easily written between the lines of the text or in the margin of manuscripts opposite the words of which they supplied the explanation. In the process of time the glosses grew in number, and in consequence they were gathered in separate books where they appeared, first in the same order of succession as they would have had if written in the margin of the codices, and ultimately in a regular alphabetical order. These collections of glosses thus formed kinds of lexicons which gave the concrete meaning of the difficult words of the text and even historical, geographical, biographical, and other notices, which the collectors deemed necessary or useful to illustrate the text of sacred writings.

A lexicon of the kind is usually called a "glossary" (from Latin glossarium), or just "gloss". From a single explanatory word, interlined or placed in the margin, the word gloss has been extended to denote an entire expository sentence, and in many instances even a running commentary on an entire book.

== Glosses as marginal notes ==
Marginal notes are found in nearly all manuscripts and printed editions of the scriptures. With regard to the Hebrew text, these glosses or marginal notes are mostly extracts from the Masorah or collection of traditional remarks. They usually bear on what was regarded as a questionable reading or spelling in the text, but yet was allowed to remain unmodified in the text itself through respect for its actual form. At times the margin bids the reader to transpose, interchange, restore, or remove a consonant, while at other times it directs him to omit or insert even an entire word. Some of these glosses are of importance for the correct reading or understanding of the original Hebrew, while nearly all have contributed to its uniform transmission since the 11th century.

The marginal notes of Greek and Latin manuscripts are annotations of all kinds, chiefly the results of exegetical and critical study, crowding the margins of these copies and printed texts far more than those of the manuscripts and editions of the original Hebrew. In regard to the Latin Vulgate, in particular, these glosses grew to so many textual readings that Pope Sixtus V, when publishing his official edition of the Vulgate in 1588, decreed that henceforth copies of it should not be supplied with such variations recorded in the margin. The Douay Version respected this idea.

James I of England wanted the Authorized Version to be free of marginal notes, but it appeared in 1611 with such notes, usually recording various readings. The glosses or marginal notes of the British Revised Version published 1881–1885, are greatly in excess over those of the Version of 1611. They give various readings, alternate renderings, critical remarks, etc. The marginal notes of the American Standard Revised Version (1900–1901) are of the same general description as those found in the British Revised Version.

== Glosses as textual additions ==
=== Hebrew Bible ===
The word gloss designates not only marginal notes, but also words or remarks inserted for various reasons in the very text of the scriptures. The existence of such textual additions in the Bible is universally admitted by Biblical scholars with regard to the Hebrew text, although there is at times considerable disagreement as to the actual expressions that should be treated as such.

Besides the eighteen corrections of the Scribes which ancient Rabbis regard as made in the Tanakh before their time, and which were probably due to the fact that marginal explanations had of old been embodied in the text itself, recent scholars have treated as textual additions many words and expressions scattered throughout the Hebrew Bible. Thus the defenders of the Mosaic authorship of the Pentateuch naturally maintain that the more or less extensive notices found in the Mosaic writings and relative to matters geographical, historical, etc., decidedly later than Moses' time, should be regarded as post-Mosaic textual additions. Others, struck with the lack of smoothness of style noticeable in several passages of the original Hebrew, or with the apparent inconsistencies in its parallel statements, have appealed to textual additions as offering a natural and adequate explanation of the facts observed. Some have even admitted the view that Midrashim, or kinds of Jewish commentaries, were at an early date utilized in the framing or in the transcription of our present Hebrew text, and thus would account for what they consider as actual and extensive additions to its primitive form. By means of the literary feature known as "parallelism" in Hebrew poetry, many textual additions may be suspected in the Hebrew text of the poetical books, notably in the Book of Job.

The presence of similar textual additions in the text of the Septuagint, or oldest Greek translation of the Old Testament, was well known to the Roman editors of that version under Sixtus V. One has only to compare attentively the words of that ancient version with those of the original Hebrew to remain convinced that the Septuagint translators have time and again deliberately deviated from the text which they rendered into Greek, and thus made a number of more or less important additions thereunto. These translators frequently manifest a desire to supply what the original had omitted or to clear up what appeared ambiguous. Frequently, too, they adopt paraphrastic renderings to avoid the most marked anthropomorphisms of the text before them: while at times they seem to be guided in their additions by the Halacha and Haggadah.

=== New Testament ===
Glosses as textual additions exist also in manuscripts of the New Testament, owing to a variety of reasons, the principal among which may be:

- copyists have embedded marginal notes in the text itself
- they have at times supplemented the words of an Evangelist by means of the parallel passages in the other Gospels
- sometimes they have completed New Testament's quotations from the Old Testament

=== Vulgate versions ===
Textual additions appear in the manuscripts and printed editions of the Latin Vulgate. Its author, Jerome, freely inserted in his rendering of the original Hebrew historical, geographical and doctrinal remarks he thought necessary for the understanding of Scriptural passages by ordinary readers. Nevertheless, he complains at times that during his own life copyists, instead of faithfully transcribing his translation, embodied in the text notes found in the margin. After his death manuscripts of the Vulgate, especially those of the Spanish type, were enriched with all kinds of additional readings, which, together with other textual variations embodied in early printed copies of the Vulgate, led ultimately to the official editions of Jerome's work by Pope Sixtus V and Pope Clement VIII.

== Glosses as scriptural lexicons ==
Rabbinical Tanakh commentaries contain collections of glosses, or "glossaries", with chief object to supply explanations of Hebrew words. A part of the Masorah may also be considered as a kind of glossary to the Hebrew Bible; and the same thing may be said in reference to the collections of Oriental and Western readings given in the sixth volume of the London Polyglot. As regards the Greek Bible texts, there are no separate collections of glosses; yet these texts are taken into account, together with the rest of the Greek literature, in a certain number of glossaries which afford explanations of difficult words in the Greek language. The following are the principal glossaries of that description:

- the lexicon of Hesychius, of the 4th century;
- the "Lexeon synagoge" (collection of glosses) of Photius (died 891);
- the lexicon of Suidas, apparently an author of the 10th century;
- the "Etymologicum Magnum" by an unknown writer of the twelfth or the 13th century;
- the "Synagoge lexeon" of the Byzantine monk Zonaras;
- the "Dictionarium" of the Benedictine Varius Phavorinus, published early in the 16th century.

Most of the glosses illustrating the language of Scripture which are found in the works of Hesychius, Suidas, Phavorinus, and in the "Etymologium Magnum", were collected and published by J. C. Ernesti (Leipzig, 1785–86). The best separate gloss on the Latin Vulgate, as a collection of explanations chiefly of its words, is that of Isidore of Seville, which he completed in 632, and which bears the title of "Originum sive Etymologiarum libri XX". It is found in Migne, P. L., LXXXII.

== Glosses as commentaries ==
As Scriptural commentaries there are two celebrated glosses on the Vulgate. The former is the Glossa Ordinaria, thus called from its common use during the Middle Ages. Its author, who was believed to be the German Walafrid Strabo (died 849), had some knowledge of Greek and made extracts chiefly from the Latin Church Fathers and from the writings of his master, Rabanus Maurus, for the purpose of illustrating the various senses—principally the literal sense—of all the books of the Bible. This gloss is quoted as a high authority by Petrus Lombardus and Thomas Aquinas, and it was known as "the tongue of Scripture". Until the 17th century it remained the favourite commentary on the Bible; and it was only gradually superseded by more independent works of exegesis. The Glossa Ordinaria is found in vols. CXIII and CXIV of Migne, P. L.

The second gloss, the Glossa Interlinearis, derived its name from the fact that it was written over the words in the text of the Vulgate. It was the work of Anselm of Laon (died 1117), who had some acquaintance with Hebrew and Greek.

After the 12th century copies of the Vulgate were usually supplied with both these glosses, the Glossa Ordinaria being inserted in the margin, at the top and at the sides, and the Glossa Interlineari" being placed between the lines of the Vulgate text; while later, from the 14th century onward, the "Postilla" of Nicholas of Lyra and the "Additions" of Paulus Burgensis were added at the foot of each page. Some early printed editions of the Vulgate exhibit all this exegetical apparatus; and the latest and best among them is the one by Leander a S. Martino, O.S.B. (six vols. fol., Antwerp, 1634).
