= Uncial 075 =

- New Testament manuscript
- Text: Pauline epistles
- Date: 10th century
- Script: Greek
- Found: Kosinitza
- Now at: National Library of Greece
- Size: 27 x 19 cm
- Type: mixed
- Category: III

Uncial 075 (in the Gregory-Aland numbering), Οπ^{3} (Soden), is a Greek uncial manuscript of the New Testament, dated palaeographically to the 10th century. Formerly it was designated by ג. It was also classified as minuscule codex 382^{p}.

== Description ==
The codex contains the Pauline epistles, on 333 parchment leaves, with lacunae (Romans; 1 Corinthians 1:1-15:28; Hebrews 11:38-13:25). The text is written in one column per page, 31 lines per page, in semi-uncial letters. The biblical text is surrounded by a commentary (catena). Size 27 cm by 19 cm.

The leaves 61-65, 366-369 were supplied by a later hand (in minuscule) in the 13th century.

The Greek text of this codex is mostly Byzantine with some Alexandrian readings. Aland placed it in Category III.

== History ==
Currently it is dated by the INTF to the 10th century.

The manuscript was written by monk Sabbas. Formerly it was held in Kosinitza. C. R. Gregory saw the manuscript in 1886. The manuscript was classified by Gregory as minuscule 382. In 1908 Gregory gave siglum 075 to it.

It is currently housed at the National Library of Greece (Gr. 100, fol. 46-378), in Athens.

== See also ==
- List of New Testament uncials
- Textual criticism
