= Uncial 061 =

- New Testament manuscript
- Text: 1 Timothy
- Date: 5th century
- Script: Greek
- Now at: Musée du Louvre
- Size: 14 x 12 cm
- Type: Byzantine text-type
- Category: V

Uncial 061 (in the Gregory-Aland numbering), α 1035 (Soden); is a Greek uncial manuscript of the New Testament, dated palaeographically to the 5th century.

== Description ==
The codex contains a part of the First Epistle to Timothy (3:15-16; 4:1-3; 6:2-8), on two small leaves (14 cm by 12 cm), both damaged. The text is written in one column per page, 19 lines per page.

The Greek text of this codex is a representative of the Byzantine text-type with some singular readings. Aland placed it in Category V.

Codex 061 is cited in the Textual Apparatus of the UBS-4, but not in that of the Nestle-Aland edition. It has a singular reading of ᾧ ἐφανερώθη (he revealed) in 1 Timothy 3:16.

It is dated by the INTF to the 5th century.

The codex is located now in Louvre (Ms. E 7332), in Paris.

== See also ==
- List of New Testament uncials
- Textual criticism
