= An Historical Account of Two Notable Corruptions of Scripture =

Dissertation by Isaac Newton

An Historical Account of Two Notable Corruptions of Scripture is a dissertation by the English mathematician and scholar Isaac Newton. This was sent in a letter to John Locke on 14 November 1690. In fact, Newton may have been in dialogue with Locke about this issue much earlier. While living in France, Locke made a journal entry, dated 20 December 1679, where he indicates that while visiting the library at Saint-Germain-des-Prés he saw:

[T]wo very old manuscripts of the New Testament, the newest of which was, as appeared by the date of it, at least 800 years old, in each of which 1 John, ch.v. ver. 7, was quite wanting, and the end of the eighth verse ran thus, "tres unum sunt;" in another old copy the seventh verse was, but with interlining; in another much more modern copy, ver. 7 was also, but differently from the old copy; and in two other old manuscripts, also, ver. 7 was quite out, but as I remember in all of them the end of the eighth verse was "tres unum sunt."

Newton's work also built upon the textual work of Richard Simon and his own research. The text was first published in English in 1754, 27 years after his death. The account claimed to review the textual evidence available from ancient sources on two disputed Bible passages: 1 John 5:7 and 1 Timothy 3:16.

Newton describes this letter as "an account of what the reading has been in all ages, and what steps it has been changed, as far as I can hitherto determine by records", and "a criticism concerning a text of Scripture". He blames "the Roman church" for many abuses in the world and accuses it of "pious frauds". He adds that "the more learned and quick-sighted men, as Luther, Erasmus, Bullinger, Grotius, and some others, would not dissemble their knowledge".

Newton's work on this issue was part of a larger effort of scholars studying the Bible and finding that, for example, the Trinity is not found in the original manuscripts and is not explicitly expressed. Such scholarship was suppressed, and Newton kept his discoveries private.

== 1 John 5:7 ==
In the King James Version of the New Testament, 1 John 5:7 reads:

For there are three that bear record in heaven, the Father, the Word, and the Holy Ghost: and these three are one.

Using the writings of the early Church Fathers, the Greek and Latin manuscripts and the testimony of the earliest extant manuscripts of the Bible, Newton demonstrated that the words "in heaven, the Father, the Word, and the Holy Ghost: and these three are one", that support the Trinity doctrine, did not appear in the original Greek Scriptures. He then demonstrates that the words crept into the Latin versions, first as a marginal note, and later into the text itself. He noted that "the Æthiopic, Syriac, Greek, Armenian, Georgian and Slavonic versions, still in use in the several Eastern nations, Ethiopia, Egypt, Syria, Mesopotamia, and Eastern European Armenia, Georgia, Muscovy, and some others, are strangers to this reading". He argued that it was first taken into a Greek text in 1515 by Cardinal Ximenes. Finally, Newton considered the sense and context of the verse, concluding that removing the interpolation makes "the sense plain and natural, and the argument full and strong; but if you insert the testimony of 'the Three in Heaven' you interrupt and spoil it." Today most versions of the Bible are from the Critical Text and omit this verse, or retain it as only a marginal reading. However, some reject Newton’s conclusion and argue that the verse is not a later corruption.

== 1 Timothy 3:16 ==
The shorter portion of Newton's dissertation was concerned with 1 Timothy 3:16, which reads (in the King James Version):

And without controversy great is the mystery of godliness: God was manifest in the flesh, justified in the Spirit, seen of angels, preached unto the Gentiles, believed on in the world, received up into glory.

Newton argued that, by a small alteration in the Greek text, the word "God" was substituted to make the phrase read "God was manifest in the flesh" instead of "which was manifested in the flesh". (Note: Newton only gave in translation the literal texts, "which" (from the Latin) or "who" (from some Greek manuscripts). "These ancient Latins all cite the text after this manner, Great is the mystery of Godliness, which was manifested in the flesh" (p. 231); in quoting Cyril of Alexandria, Newton translates, "'Ye err,' saith he, 'not knowing the Scriptures, nor the great mystery of godliness, that is Christ; who was manifested in the flesh, justified in the spirit.'" (p. 238) and "'Moreover,' saith he, 'in my opinion, that mystery of godliness is nothing else than he who came to us from God the Father; the Word, who was manifested in the flesh.'" (p. 239). Newton contends that the original Greek was ὅ (which), changed to ὃς (who) and then to θεός (God) (see p. 230 and p. 232: "Chrysostom, I am satisfied that he read ὅ", p. 234 Nestorius, p. 237 John Cassian, and pp. 252–253 "it is more reasonable to lay the fault on the Greeks... in the Greek the sense was obscure; in the versions clear".) About this from Newton, John Burgon commented "Over this latter reading, however, we need not linger; seeing that ὅ does not find a single patron at the present day. And yet, this was the reading which was eagerly upheld during the last century: Wetstein and Sir Isaac Newton being its most strenuous advocates.") He attempted to demonstrate that early Church writers in referring to the verse knew nothing of such an alteration. (Note: In 1731 Johann Jakob Wettstein turned his attention to this passage.) This change increases textual support for trinitarianism, a doctrine to which Newton did not subscribe. There is evidence that the original Greek read 'ος' but was modified by the addition of a strikethrough to become 'θς' (see the excerpt from the Codex Sinaiticus, above). 'θς' was then assumed to be a contraction of 'θεος'. The biblical scholar Metzger explains, "no uncial (in the first hand) earlier than the eighth or ninth century [...] supports θεος; all ancient versions presuppose ὃς or ὃ; and no patristic writer prior to the last third of the fourth century testifies to the reading of θεος." In other words, Bible manuscripts closest to the original said 'who' and not 'God' in verse 16.

== Summary of both passages ==
Newton concludes: "If the ancient churches in debating and deciding the greatest mysteries of religion, knew nothing of these two texts, I understand not, why we should be so fond of them now the debates are over." With minor exceptions, it was only in the nineteenth century that Bible translations appeared changing these passages. Modern versions of the Bible from the Critical Text usually omit the addition to 1 John 5:7, but some place it in a footnote, with a comment indicating that "it is not found in the earliest manuscripts". Modern translations of 1 Timothy 3:16 following the Critical Text now typically replace "God" with "He" or "He who", while the literal Emphasized has "who".

A number of papers in the years following responded to Newton, notably John Berriman in 1741, who had seen at least some of Newton's text prior to publication. Later, Frederick Nolan in 1815, Ebenezer Henderson in 1830 and John William Burgon in the Revision Revised in 1883 all contributed substantially to the verse discussion.

== Historical background ==
Newton did not publish these findings during his lifetime, likely due to the political climate. Those who wrote against the doctrine of the Trinity were subject to persecution in England. The Blasphemy Act 1697 made it an offence to deny one of the persons of the Trinity to be God, punishable with loss of office and employment on the first occasion, further legal ramifications on the second occasion, and imprisonment without hope for bail on the third occasion. Newton's friend William Whiston (translator of the works of Josephus) lost his professorship at Cambridge for this reason in 1711. In 1693 a pamphlet attacking the Trinity was burned by order of the House of Lords, and the next year its printer and author were prosecuted.

The dissertation was published in 1754.

== See also ==
- Isaac Newton's religious views
- Trinitarianism in the Church Fathers
