= Religious views of Isaac Newton =

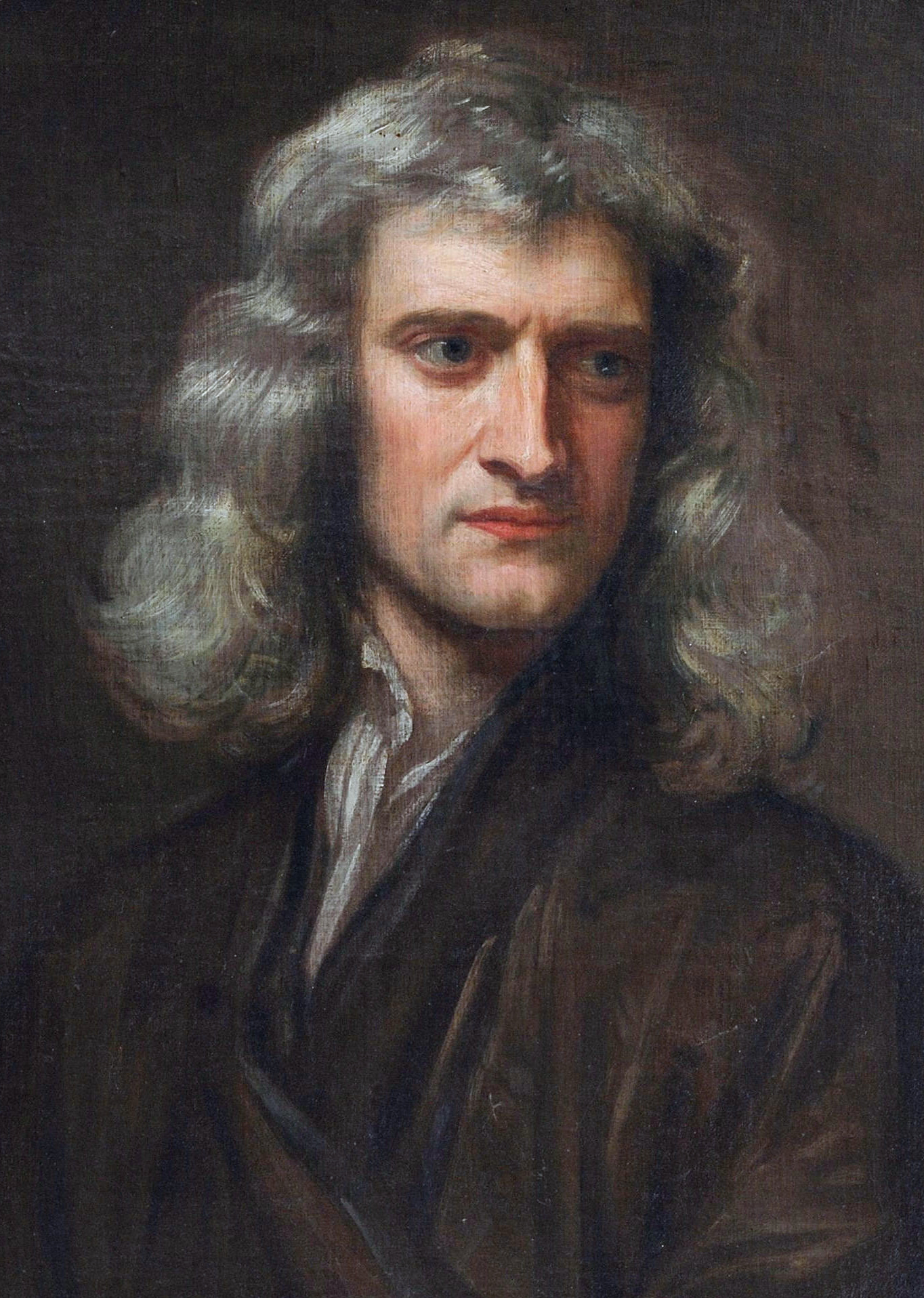
Sir Isaac Newton at 46 in Godfrey Kneller's 1689 portrait

Isaac Newton (4 January 1643 – 31 March 1727) was considered an insightful and erudite theologian by his Protestant contemporaries. He wrote many works that would now be classified as occult studies, and he wrote religious tracts that dealt with the literal interpretation of the Bible. He kept his heretical beliefs private.

Newton's conception of the physical world provided a model of the natural world that would reinforce stability and harmony in the civic world. Newton saw a monotheistic God as the masterful creator whose existence could not be denied in the face of the grandeur of all creation. Born into an Anglican family, he became a devout but heterodox Protestant Christian. By his thirties Newton held a Christian faith that, had it been made public, would not have been considered orthodox by mainstream Christians. Many scholars now consider him a Nontrinitarian Arian.

He may have been influenced by Socinian christology.

== Early history ==
Newton was born into an Anglican family three months after the death of his father, a prosperous farmer also named Isaac Newton. When Newton was three, his mother married the rector of the neighbouring parish of North Witham and went to live with her new husband, the Reverend Barnabas Smith, leaving her son in the care of his maternal grandmother, Margery Ayscough. Isaac apparently hated his step-father, and had nothing to do with Smith during his childhood. His maternal uncle, the rector serving the parish of Burton Coggles, was involved to some extent in the care of Isaac.

In 1667, Newton became a Fellow of Trinity College, Cambridge, making necessary his commitment to taking Holy Orders within seven years of completing his MA, which he did the following year. He was also required to take a vow of celibacy and recognize the Thirty-Nine Articles of the Church of England. Newton considered ceasing his studies prior to completion to avoid the ordination made necessary by law of King Charles II. He was eventually successful in avoiding the statute, assisted in this by the efforts of Isaac Barrow, as in 1676 the then Secretary of State for the Northern Department, Joseph Williamson, changed the relevant statute of Trinity College to provide dispensation from this duty. Newton then embarked on an investigative study of the early history of the Church, which developed, during the 1680s, into inquiries about the origins of religion. At around the same time, he developed a scientific view on motion and matter. Of Philosophiæ Naturalis Principia Mathematica he stated:

When I wrote my treatise about our Systeme I had an eye upon such Principles as might work with considering men for the beliefe of a Deity and nothing can rejoyce me more than to find it useful for that purpose.

== Christian heresy ==
According to most scholars, Newton was Arian, not holding to Trinitarianism. Scholars have generally concluded that Newton's heretical beliefs were self-taught, but he may have been influenced by then-current heretical writings; controversies over unitarianism were raging at the time.

As well as rejecting the Trinity, Newton's studies led him to reject belief in the immortal soul. Despite his unorthodox beliefs, Sir Isaac Newton affirmed infant baptism, in keeping with his Anglican upbringing, writing, "The Declaration by imposition of hands is a Jewish ceremony. We call it confirmation, meaning a confirmation of what was done by the Godfathers in baptizing the Infant."

Although he was not a Socinian, he shared many similar beliefs with them. They were a unitarian Reformation movement in Poland. A manuscript he sent to John Locke, in which he disputed the existence of the Trinity, was never published. In 2019, John Rogers stated, "Heretics both, John Milton and Isaac Newton were, as most scholars now agree, Arians."

Newton refused the sacrament of the Anglican church offered before his death.

After his death, Deists sometimes claimed him as one of their own, as have Trinitarians. In fact, he was an active apologist who opposed both orthodox teachings and religious skepticism.

== God as masterful creator ==
Newton saw God as the masterful creator whose existence could not be denied in the face of the grandeur of all creation. Nevertheless, he rejected Leibniz's thesis that God would necessarily make a perfect world which requires no intervention from the creator. In Query 31 of the Opticks, Newton simultaneously made an argument from design and for the necessity of intervention:

For while comets move in very eccentric orbs in all manner of positions, blind fate could never make all the planets move one and the same way in orbs concentric, some inconsiderable irregularities excepted which may have arisen from the mutual actions of comets and planets on one another, and which will be apt to increase, till this system wants a reformation.

This passage prompted an attack by Leibniz in a letter to his friend Caroline of Ansbach:

Sir Isaac Newton and his followers have also a very odd opinion concerning the work of God. According to their doctrine, God Almighty wants to wind up his watch from time to time: otherwise it would cease to move. He had not, it seems, sufficient foresight to make it a perpetual motion.

Leibniz's letter initiated the Leibniz-Clarke correspondence, ostensibly with Newton's friend and disciple Samuel Clarke, although as Caroline wrote, Clarke's letters "are not written without the advice of the Chev. Newton". Clarke complained that Leibniz's concept of God as a "supra-mundane intelligence" who set up a "pre-established harmony" was but a step from atheism: "And as those men, who pretend that in an earthly government things may go on perfectly well without the king himself ordering or disposing of any thing, may reasonably be suspected that they would like very well to set the king aside: so, whosoever contends, that the beings of the world can go on without the continual direction of God...his doctrine does in effect tend to exclude God out of the world".

In addition to stepping in to re-form the Solar System, Newton invoked God's active intervention to prevent the stars falling in on each other, and perhaps in preventing the amount of motion in the universe from decaying due to viscosity and friction. In private correspondence, Newton sometimes hinted that the force of gravity was due to an immaterial influence:

Tis inconceivable that inanimate brute matter should (without the mediation of something else which is not material) operate upon & affect other matter without mutual contact.

Leibniz said that such an immaterial influence would be a continual miracle; this was another strand of his debate with Clarke.

Newton's view has been considered to be close to deism, and several biographers and scholars labelled him as a deist who is strongly influenced by Christianity. However, he differed from strict adherents of deism in that he invoked God as a special physical cause to keep the planets in orbits. He warned against using the law of gravity to view the universe as a mere machine, like a great clock, saying:

This most beautiful system of the sun, planets, and comets, could only proceed from the counsel and dominion of an intelligent Being. [...] This Being governs all things, not as the soul of the world, but as Lord over all; and on account of his dominion he is wont to be called "Lord God" παντοκρατωρ [pantokratōr], or "Universal Ruler". [...] The Supreme God is a Being eternal, infinite, [and] absolutely perfect.

Opposition to godliness is atheism in profession and idolatry in practice. Atheism is so senseless and odious to mankind that it never had many professors.

On the other hand, latitudinarian and Newtonian ideas taken too far resulted in the millenarians, a religious faction dedicated to the concept of a mechanical universe, but finding in it the same enthusiasm and mysticism that the Enlightenment had fought so hard to extinguish. Newton showed considerable interest in millenarianism, as he wrote about both the Book of Daniel and the Book of Revelation in his Observations Upon the Prophecies.

Newton's concept of the physical world provided a model of the natural world that would reinforce stability and harmony in the civic world.

== Bible ==
Newton spent a great deal of time trying to discover hidden messages within the Bible. After 1690, Newton wrote a number of religious tracts dealing with the literal interpretation of the Bible. In a manuscript Newton wrote in 1704, he describes his attempts to extract scientific information from the Bible. He estimated that the world would end no earlier than 2060. In predicting this, he said, "This I mention not to assert when the time of the end shall be, but to put a stop to the rash conjectures of fanciful men who are frequently predicting the time of the end, and by doing so bring the sacred prophesies into discredit as often as their predictions fail."

The Library of Trinity College, Cambridge, holds in its collections Newton's personal copy of the King James Version, which exhibits numerous marginal notes in his hand as well as about 500 reader's marks pointing to passages of particular interest to him. A note is attached to the Bible, indicating that it "was given by Sir Isaac Newton in his last illness to the woman who nursed him". The book was eventually bequeathed to the Library in 1878. The places Newton marked or annotated in his Bible bear witness to his investigations into theology, chronology, alchemy, and natural philosophy; and some of these relate to passages of the General Scholium to the second edition of the Principia. Some other passages he marked offer glimpses of his devotional practices and reveal distinct tensions in his personality. Newton's Bible appears to have been first and foremost a customized reference tool in the hands of a biblical scholar and critic.

Newton's alchemical knowledge influenced his religious views.

=== The Trinity ===
Newton's work of New Testament textual criticism, An Historical Account of Two Notable Corruptions of Scripture, was sent in a letter to John Locke on 14 November 1690. In it, he reviews evidence that the earliest Christians did not believe in the Trinity.

According to Manoilă, Newton considered Jesus to be God as dominion, not as being or substance.

=== Prophecy ===
Newton relied upon the existing Scripture for prophecy, believing his interpretations would set the record straight in the face of what he considered to be, "so little understood". Though he would never write a cohesive body of work on prophecy, Newton's beliefs would lead him to write several treatises on the subject, including an unpublished guide for prophetic interpretation titled Rules for interpreting the words & language in Scripture. In this manuscript, he details the requirements for what he considered to be the proper interpretation of the Bible.

=== End of the world vs. Start of the millennial kingdom ===
In his posthumously published Observations upon the Prophecies of Daniel, and the Apocalypse of St. John, Newton expressed his belief that Bible prophecy would not be understood "until the time of the end", and that even then "none of the wicked shall understand". Referring to that as a future time ("the last age, the age of opening these things, be now approaching"), Newton also anticipated "the general preaching of the Gospel be approaching" and "the Gospel must first be preached in all nations before the great tribulation, and end of the world".

Over the years, a large amount of media attention and public interest has circulated regarding largely unknown and unpublished documents, evidently written by Isaac Newton, that indicate he believed the world could end in 2060. While Newton also had many other possible dates (e.g. 2034), he did not believe that the end of the world would take place specifically in 2060.

Like most Protestant theologians of his time, Newton believed that the Papal Office and not any one particular Pope was the fulfillment of the Biblical predictions about Antichrist, whose rule was predicted to last for 1,260 years. They applied the day-year principle (in which a day represents a year in prophecy) to certain key verses in the books of Daniel and Revelation (also known as the Apocalypse), and looked for significant dates in the Papacy's rise to power to begin this timeline. Newton's calculation ending in 2060 is based on the 1,260-year timeline commencing in 800 AD when Charlemagne became the first Holy Roman Emperor and reconfirmed the earlier (756 AD) Donation of Pepin to the Papacy.

=== 2016 vs. 2060 ===
Between the time he wrote his 2060 prediction (about 1704) until his death in 1727, Newton conversed, both first-hand and by correspondence, with other theologians of his time. Those contemporaries who knew him during the remaining 23 years of his life appear to be in agreement that Newton, and the "best interpreters" including Jonathan Edwards, Robert Fleming, Moses Lowman, Phillip Doddridge, and Bishop Thomas Newton, were eventually "pretty well agreed" that the 1,260-year timeline should be calculated from the year 756 AD.

F. A. Cox also confirmed that this was the view of Newton and others, including himself:

The author adopts the hypothesis of Fleming, Sir Isaac Newton, and Lowman, that the 1260 years commenced in A.d. 756; and consequently that the millennium will not begin till the year 2016.

Thomas Williams stated that this timeline had become the predominant view among the leading Protestant theologians of his time:

Mr. Lowman, though an earlier commentator, is (we believe) far more generally followed; and he commences the 1260 years from about 756, when, by aid of Pepin, King of France, the Pope obtained considerable temporalities. This carries on the reign of Popery to 2016, or sixteen years into the commencement of the Millennium, as it is generally reckoned.

In April of 756 AD, Pepin, King of France, accompanied by Pope Stephen II entered northern Italy, forcing the Lombard King Aistulf to lift his siege of Rome and return to Pavia. Following Aistulf's capitulation, Pepin gave the newly conquered territories to the Papacy through the Donation of Pepin, thereby elevating the Pope from being a subject of the Byzantine Empire to the head of state, with temporal power over the newly constituted Papal States.

The end of the timeline is based on Daniel 8:25, which reads "he shall be broken without hand" and is understood to mean that the end of the Papacy will not be caused by any human action. Volcanic activity is described as the means by which Rome will be overthrown.

Antichrist will retain some part of his dominion over the nations till about the year 2016. And when the 1260 years are expired, Rome itself, with all its magnificence, will be absorbed in a lake of fire, sink into the sea, and rise no more at all for ever.

In 1870, the newly formed Kingdom of Italy annexed the remaining Papal States, depriving the Popes of any temporal rule for the next 59 years. Unaware that Papal rule would be restored (albeit on a greatly diminished scale) in 1929 as head of the Vatican City state, the historicist view that the Papacy is the Antichrist and the associated timelines delineating his rule rapidly declined in popularity as one of the defining characteristics of the Antichrist (i.e. that he would also be a political temporal power at the time of the return of Jesus) were no longer met.

Eventually, the prediction was largely forgotten and no major Protestant denomination currently subscribes to this timeline.

Despite the dramatic nature of a prediction of the end of the world, Newton may not have been referring to the 2060 date as a destructive act resulting in the annihilation of the earth and its inhabitants, but rather one in which he believed the world was to be replaced with a new one based upon a transition to an era of divinely inspired peace. In Christian theology, this concept is often referred to as The Second Coming of Jesus Christ and the establishment of Paradise by The Kingdom of God on Earth.

== Other beliefs ==
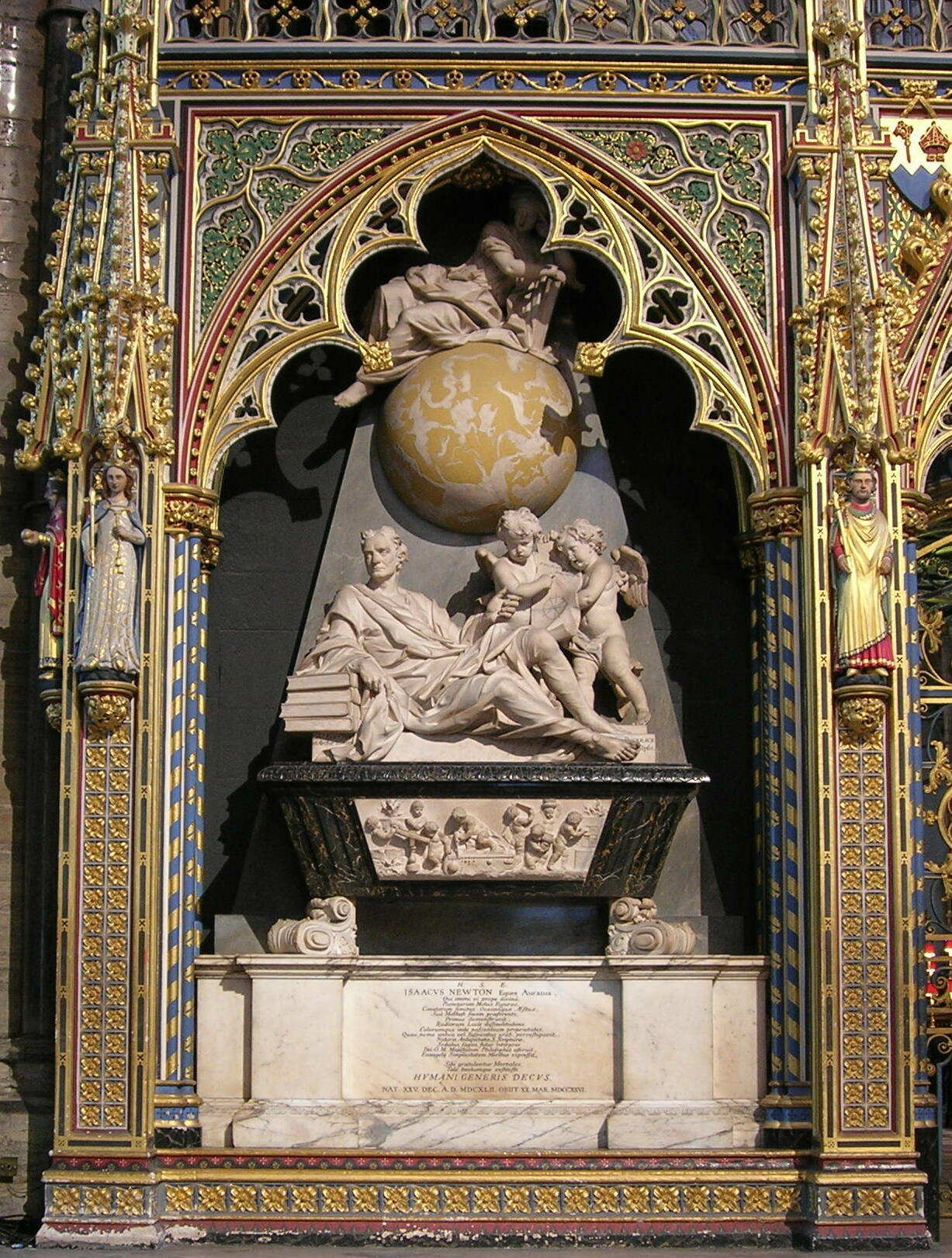
Newton's grave in Westminster Abbey

Henry More's belief in the universe and rejection of Cartesian dualism may have influenced Newton's religious ideas. Later works—The Chronology of Ancient Kingdoms Amended (1728) and Observations Upon the Prophecies of Daniel and the Apocalypse of St. John (1733)—were published after his death.

Newton and Boyle's mechanical philosophy was promoted by rationalist pamphleteers as a viable alternative to the pantheists and enthusiasts, and was accepted hesitantly by orthodox clergy as well as dissident preachers like the latitudinarians. The clarity and simplicity of science was seen as a way in which to combat the emotional and mystical superlatives of superstitious enthusiasm, as well as the threat of atheism.

The attacks made against pre-Enlightenment magical thinking, and the mystical elements of Christianity, were given their foundation with Boyle's mechanical conception of the universe. Newton gave Boyle's ideas their completion through mathematical proofs, and more importantly was very successful in popularizing them. Newton refashioned the world governed by an interventionist God into a world crafted by a God that designs along rational and universal principles. These principles were available for all people to discover, allowed man to pursue his own aims fruitfully in this life, not the next, and to perfect himself with his own rational powers.

A late, indirect anecdotal report quoted by J. Edleston relates that the Swedish scholar Jacob Jonas Björnståhl, during a visit to the Anabaptist preacher Mr. Fontein in Amsterdam in 1774, was told that Newton had believed Muhammad to have been sent by God to lead the Arabs back to belief in one God, while rejecting the "fables" and miracles found in the Qur'an and in the accounts of Muhammad's life. According to Fontein, he had heard this account from professors or fellows at Cambridge during a visit to England in 1738, eleven years after Newton's death. No evidence, however, is provided as to when exactly, or in what context, Newton supposedly expressed this view.

Furthermore, this claim finds no corroboration in Newton's own surviving writings, which where Islam is mentioned, instead offers a different assessment. In his Untitled Treatise on Revelation, he specifically identifies it as a "fals religion", interpreting the Fifth Trumpet of Revelation as representing the Islamic empire. He thus understood the rise and expansion of the Saracen Empire in apocalyptic biblical terms. This anecdote should therefore be distinguished from his surviving theological writings rather than treated as an established statement of his overall attitude towards Islam.

== Writings ==
His first writing on the subject of religion was Introductio. Continens Apocalypseos rationem generalem (Introduction. Containing an explanation of the Apocalypse), which has an unnumbered leaf between folios 1 and 2 with the subheading De prophetia prima, written in Latin some time prior to 1670. Written subsequently in English was Notes on early Church history and the moral superiority of the 'barbarians' to the Romans. His last writing, published in 1737 with the miscellaneous works of John Greaves, was entitled A Dissertation upon the Sacred Cubit of the Jews and the Cubits of the several Nations. Newton did not publish any of his works of biblical study during his lifetime. All of Newton's writings on corruption in biblical scripture and the church took place after the late 1670s and prior to the middle of 1690.

== See also ==
- Classical mechanics
- Clockwork universe theory
- Religious and philosophical views of Albert Einstein
