= Newton Project =

Academic project documenting Isaac Newton's work

The Newton Project
- Formation: 1998
- Editors: Rob Iliffe; Scott Mandelbrote
- Technical Director: Michael Hawkins
- Website: newtonproject.ox.ac.uk

The Newton Project is an academic digital humanities project based at the University of Oxford that transcribes, digitises, contextualises, and makes publicly accessible the work of Isaac Newton. The project originated in 1998 and it has been undertaken in close collaboration with Cambridge University Digital Library, the National Library of Israel, the Chymistry of Isaac Newton Project at Indiana University Bloomington, and the Newton Project Canada at the University of King's College.

== History ==
The Newton Project was started in 1998 by Rob Iliffe and Scott Mandelbrote, with its core functions directed by Iliffe since 1999.

Originally the project was based at the University of Sussex and the aim was to produce a comprehensive collection of Newton's non-scientific work.

The Newton Project Canada was started in 2004 at the University of King's College in Halifax, Nova Scotia. It works in conjunction with the UK-based project and operates as the Canadian centre for transcribing Newton's work.

In 2007, the project considerably widened its scope by aiming to produce transcriptions of the entirety of Newton's printed and unpublished writings.

In 1991, the Chadwyck-Healey publishing company had released 43 reels of microfilm comprising all of the known Newton manuscripts. The majority of transcriptions of Newton's work had been undertaken using this microfilm up until 2009 when the Newton Project gained access to digitised images of photocopies from the 1970s. These were made available by the Chymistry of Isaac Newton Project based at Indiana University Bloomington, which largely concentrates on the alchemical writings of Newton, under the general editorship of William R. Newman. These images were considerably more legible and complete than the Chadwyck-Healey microfilms.

The project gained access to high-quality colour images of the archives of Newton's work held by the Cambridge University Digital Library and the National Library of Israel in 2011.

When Rob Iliffe undertook a new post as Professor in History of Science at Linacre College at Oxford in late 2015, the Newton Project also moved its primary base to Oxford.
