= Scientific Revolution =

Emergence of modern science (1572–1687)

- 1543 or 1572 – 1687
Renaissance	Enlightenment
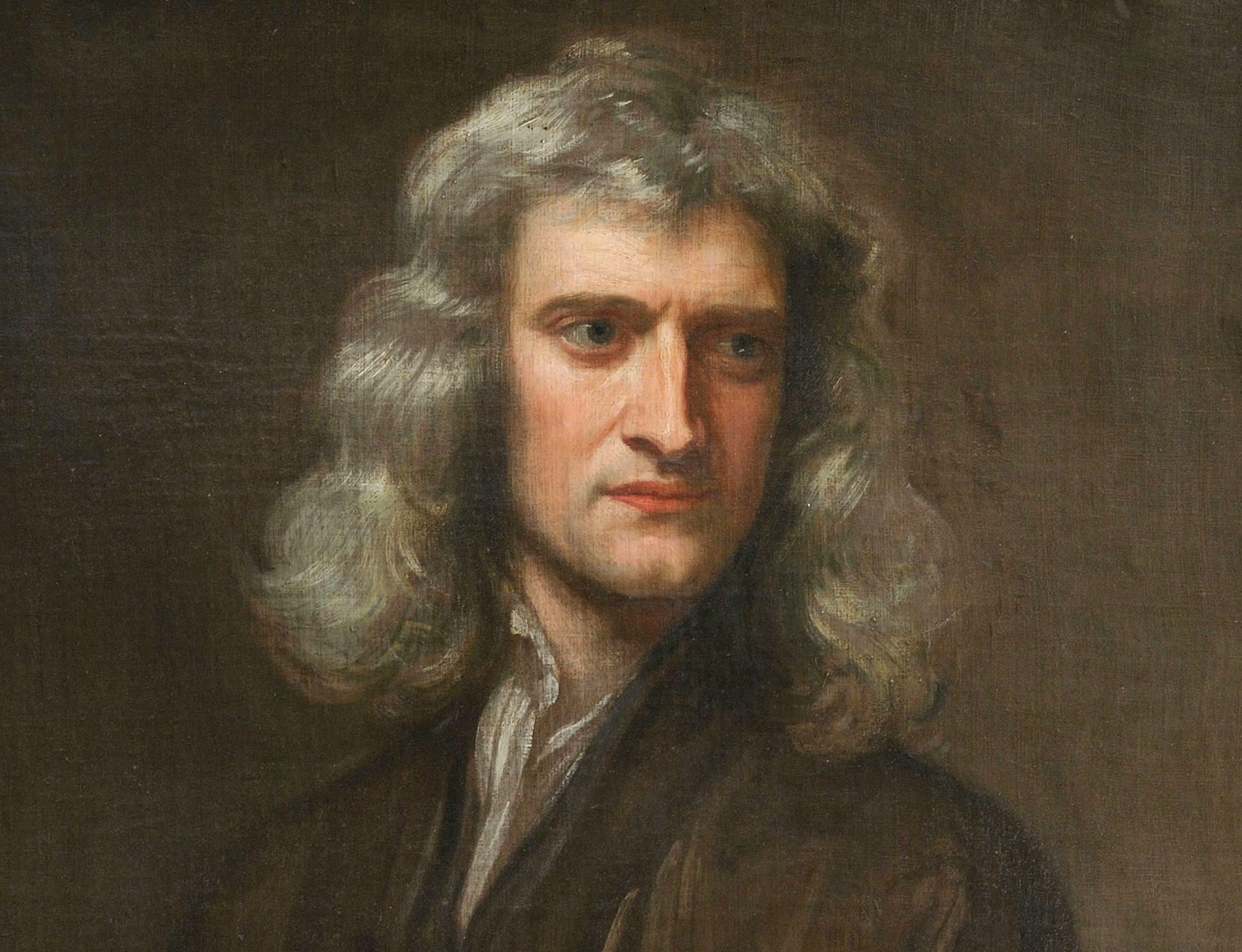
- Portrait of Isaac Newton by Godfrey Kneller, 1689
- Location: Early modern Europe
- Leaders: Andreas Vesalius (anatomy); Nicolaus Copernicus (astronomy); Tycho Brahe (astronomy); Galileo Galilei (astronomy); Johannes Kepler (astronomy); Francis Bacon (empiricism); René Descartes (empiricism, physics); Robert Boyle (chemistry); Antonie van Leeuwenhoek (microbiology); Isaac Newton (physics)
- Key events: 1572 supernova Invention of telescope astronomy Discovery of Kepler's laws Publication of Principia Mathematica

The Scientific Revolution of the 16th and 17th centuries in Europe was an irreversible break with the natural philosophy that had preceded it, fundamentally changing how the natural world was investigated and understood. The New Science that emerged departed from previous Greek conceptions and traditions, was more mechanistic in its worldview and more integrated with mathematics, and was focused on the acquisition and interpretation of new evidence.

The Scientific Revolution is a convenient boundary between ancient thought and modern science. While the period is frequently said to have begun in 1543 with the printings of De humani corporis fabrica (On the Workings of the Human Body) by Andreas Vesalius and De Revolutionibus (On the Revolutions of the Heavenly Spheres) by Nicolaus Copernicus, the SN 1572 supernova has also been suggested as its beginning. The period culminated with the publication of the Philosophiæ Naturalis Principia Mathematica in 1687 by Isaac Newton.

== Terminology and periodisation ==
The word "revolution" has been used to describe scientific upheaval since at least the 18th century. In 1747, the French mathematician Alexis Clairaut applied it to Isaac Newton. In the 19th century William Whewell chose it to label "the transition from an implicit trust in the internal powers of man's mind to a professed dependence upon external observation; and from an unbounded reverence for the wisdom of the past, to a fervid expectation of change and improvement." In the 20th century, Alexandre Koyré used the term "scientific revolution" to describe a "mutation" in human intellect. The term was popularized by the historian and philosopher of history Herbert Butterfield in his Origins of Modern Science who provocatively asserted that "it outshines everything since the rise of Christianity" in European history. The Scientific Revolution is widely understood by scholars as synonymous with the emergence of "modern" science.

While the Scientific Revolution is frequently said to have begun in 1543 with the printings of De humani corporis fabrica (On the Workings of the Human Body) by Andreas Vesalius and De Revolutionibus (On the Revolutions of the Heavenly Spheres) by Nicolaus Copernicus and to be complete in the "grand synthesis" of Isaac Newton's 1687 Principia, other historians have proposed 1572, when Tycho Brahe observed the 1572 supernova, as an alternative starting date.

== Significance ==
The period saw a fundamental transformation in scientific ideas across mathematics, physics, astronomy, and biology in institutions supporting scientific investigation and in the more widely held picture of the universe. The Scientific Revolution led to the establishment of several modern sciences. In 1984, Joseph Ben-David wrote:

Rapid accumulation of knowledge, which has characterized the development of science since the 17th century, had never occurred before that time. The new kind of scientific activity emerged only in a few countries of Western Europe, and it was restricted to that small area for about two hundred years. (Since the 19th century, scientific knowledge has been assimilated by the rest of the world).

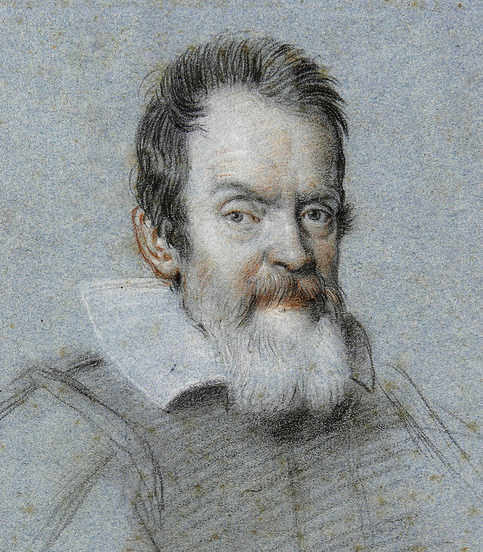
Portrait of Galileo Galilei by Ottavio Leoni

Much of the change of attitude came from Galileo Galilei whose telescopic observations provided persuasive evidence for heliocentrism and who developed the science of motion and Francis Bacon, whose "confident and emphatic announcement" in the modern progress of science inspired the creation of scientific societies such as the Royal Society.

Many contemporary writers and modern historians claim that there was a revolutionary change in world view. In 1611 English poet John Donne wrote:

[The] new Philosophy calls all in doubt,

The Element of fire is quite put out;
The Sun is lost, and th'earth, and no man's wit

Can well direct him where to look for it.

David Wootton calls the Scientific Revolution "the most important transformation in human history" since the Neolithic Revolution.

== Ancient, medieval and Renaissance background ==
=== Medieval Translations ===
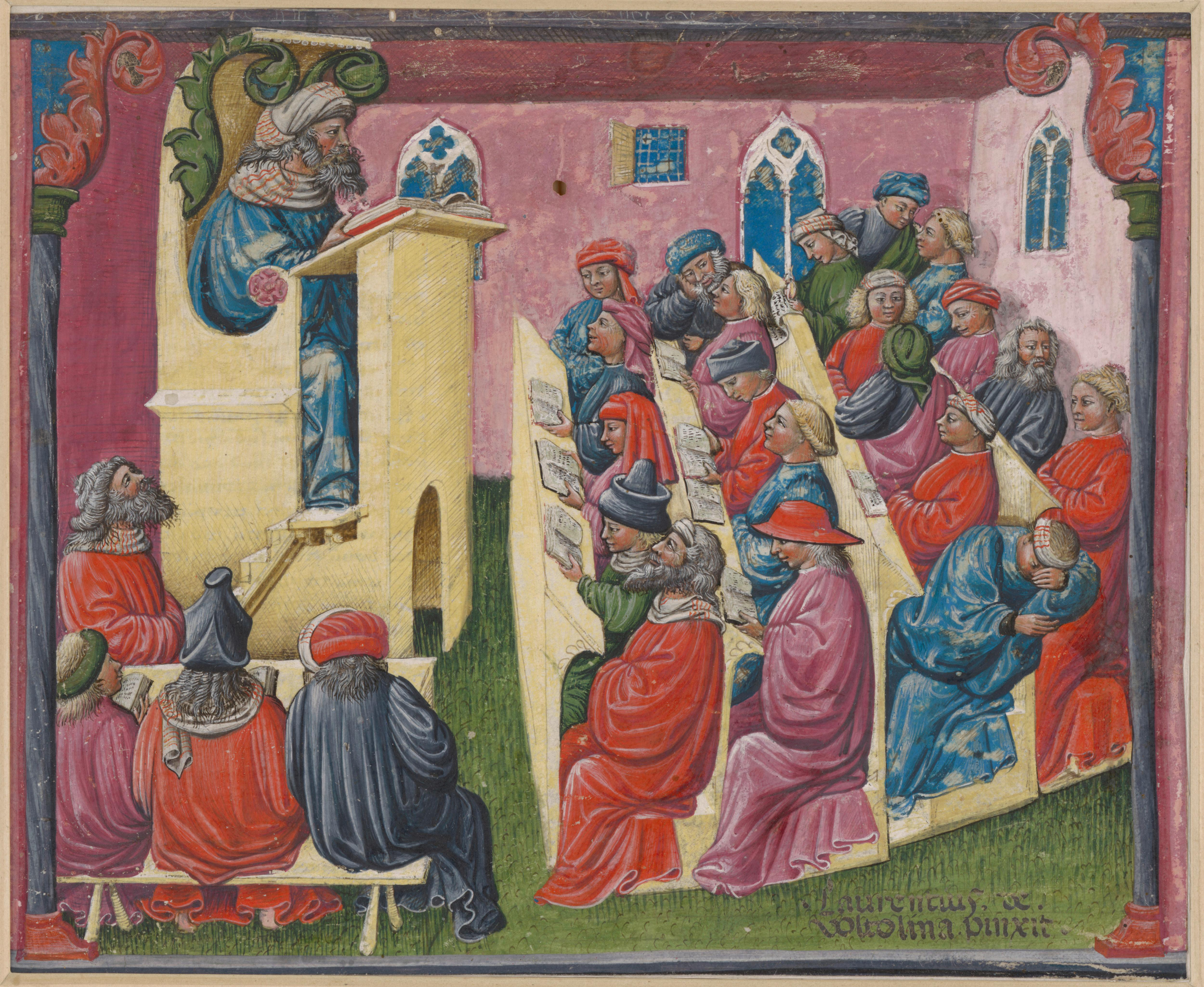
A medieval university class, 1350s

According to historians Thomas Kuhn and Edward Grant, the Scientific Revolution - carried out by scholars who used Latin as a common language - was built upon the foundation of translations, from Greek and Arabic to Latin starting in the 10th century and accelerating during the 12th and 13th centuries, of ancient Greek learning, Roman/Byzantine science and medieval Islamic science combined with the emergence of the medieval university. Grant calls this "probably the greatest intellectual expropriation of knowledge" in human history.

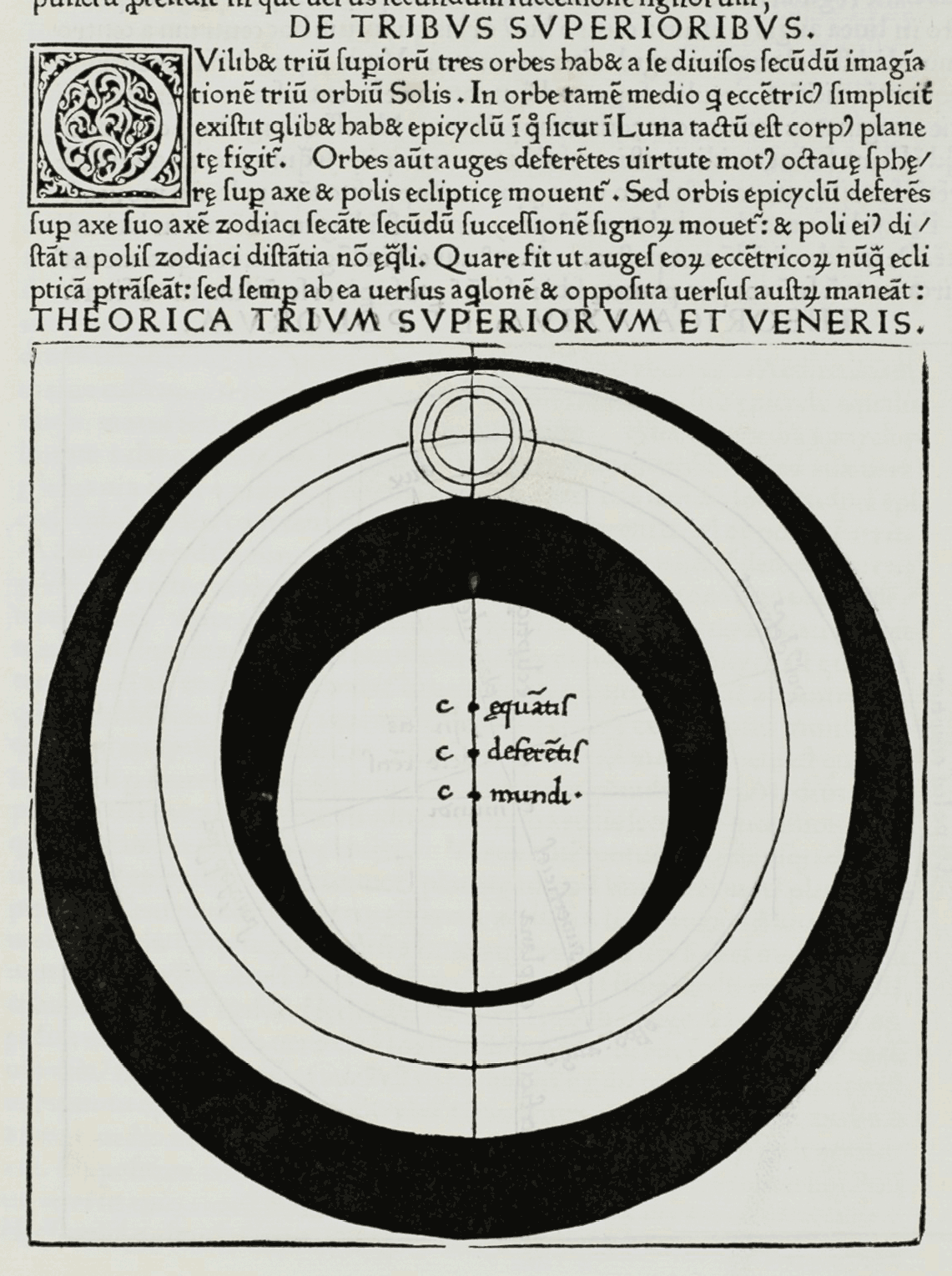
Ptolemaic model of the spheres for Venus, Mars, Jupiter, and Saturn. Georg von Peuerbach, Theoricae novae planetarum, 1474.

By the 16th century, the Aristotelian framework dominated Europe's intellectual landscape, though historians like James Hannam argue it was already fading and partly discredited. Aristotle's universe was both geocentric and hierarchical: an imperfect terrestrial region of four classical elements - earth, water, air, and fire - seeking their 'natural places' was surrounded by an unchanging celestial realm. This celestial region consisted of nested spherical shells composed of a fifth element, aether, which moved only with either perfect, circular motion or combinations of such perfect circular motions. Ptolemy's Almagest provided the mathematically rigorous framework for calculating planetary positions.

While the breakthroughs that created modern astronomy and modern physics during the 16th and 17th centuries marked a decisive rupture with Renaissance Aristotelianism, this was still a break with an existing tradition, not a creation from nothing. In that sense, the scholastics who recovered, assimilated and argued about ancient learning were a prerequisite for the Revolution. Nicolaus Copernicus, Galileo, Johannes Kepler and Newton all studied at universities founded during the High Middle Ages and all acknowledged their debts to earlier scholars.

=== Christianity ===
"When natural philosophers referred to laws of nature, they were not glibly choosing that metaphor. Laws were the result of legislation by an intelligent deity."

— John Hedley Brooke, Science and Religion: Some Historical Perspectives (1991)

In Science and the Modern World, Alfred North Whitehead argued that modern science inherited a "faith" in the power of human reason from medieval scholastics. Other scholars have noted a direct tie between "particular aspects of traditional Christianity" and the rise of science. For example, historian Peter Harrison argues that Christianity contributed to the rise of the Scientific Revolution because many of its key figures had deeply held religious convictions and believed "themselves to be champions of a science that was more compatible with Christianity than the medieval ideas about the natural world that they replaced." In The Origins of Modern Science, Butterfield observed that "the Christians helped the cause of modern rationalism by their jealous determination to sweep out of the world all miracles and magic except their own." Copernicus, Kepler, Galileo, and Newton all sincerely believed that the order and perfection of the universe were reflections of the perfection of its Creator. Far from perceiving their work as irreligious, they saw uncovering the hidden perfection of the universe using mathematics as an act of devout worship.

=== Renaissance technology ===
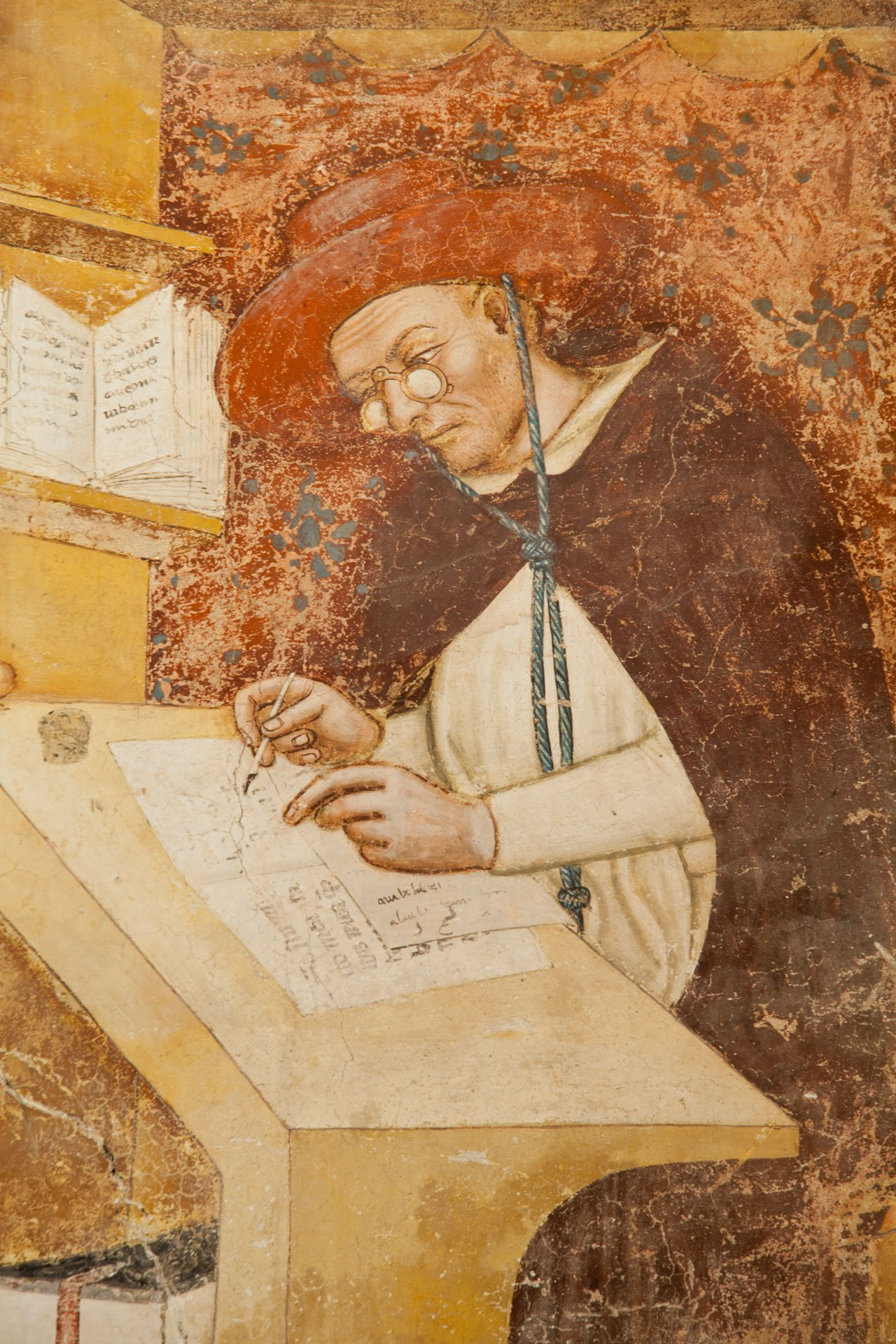
Detail of a portrait of Cardinal Hugh of Saint-Cher (wearing spectacles), painted by Tommaso da Modena in 1352

The earliest recorded comment on the use of glass for optical purposes was made in 1268 by Roger Bacon. The first eyeglasses were made in central Italy, most likely in Pisa or Florence, by about 1290, after which the widespread manufacture and use of optical glass for eyeglasses expanded rapidly in Europe. Venice became an important center of its manufacture by 1300. In the mid-15th century, Venetian glassmakers developed the exceptionally clear colourless glass, cristallo, made from high-purity quartz pebbles (instead of sand) and using manganese oxide as a "decolorizer" to neutralize the greenish tint caused by iron impurities. This was the "specialty" glass of the Renaissance era, a luxury product used for windows, mirrors, ships' lanterns, and lenses. When the first telescope was later invented during the Scientific Revolution, the first historical record of the invention did not appear in a work of natural philosophy but rather in a patent filed by a spectacle maker.

Starting in Mainz, Germany around 1440, the movable type printing-press had spread to ~270 cities and produced more than 20 million volumes by 1500.

The Scientific Revolution was also enabled by advances in book production. Before the advent of the movable type printing press, introduced in Europe in the 1440s by Johannes Gutenberg, there was no mass market on the continent for scientific treatises, as there had been for religious books. Printing decisively changed the way scientific knowledge was created, as well as how it was disseminated. Scholars in different countries now all studied the same mathematical and scientific diagrams and illustrations and read the same texts of a given author. Printing made scholarly books more widely accessible, allowing researchers to consult ancient texts freely and to compare their own observations with those of fellow scholars. Although printers' blunders still often resulted in the spread of false data (for instance, in Galileo's Sidereus Nuncius (The Starry Messenger), published in Venice in 1610, his telescopic images of the lunar surface mistakenly appeared back to front), the development of engraved metal plates allowed accurate visual information to be made permanent, a change from previously, when woodcut illustrations deteriorated through repetitive use. The ability to access previous scientific research meant that researchers did not have to always start from scratch in making sense of their own observational data.

Printing ended the manuscript culture of the Middle Ages, where facts were few and far between, and replaced it with a Renaissance printing culture where reliable and documented facts rapidly proliferated and became the secure foundation for scientific knowledge.

=== Ptolemy Is Wrong ===
Universalis Cosmographia, Waldseemüller's 1507 world map, which was the first to show the Americas separate from Asia.

After returning from Brazil in the spring of 1503, Amerigo Vespucci's Mundus Novus letter contains the first explicit articulation in print of the hypothesis that the lands discovered by European navigators to the west were not the edges of Asia, as asserted by Christopher Columbus a decade earlier, but rather an entirely different continent (a "New World"):

In passed days I wrote very fully to you of my return from new countries, which have been found and explored with the ships, at the cost and by the command of this Most Serene King of Portugal; and it is lawful to call it a new world, because none of these countries were known to our ancestors and to all who hear about them they will be entirely new. For the opinion of the ancients was, that the greater part of the world beyond the equinoctial line to the south was not land, but only sea, which they have called the Atlantic; and even if they have affirmed that any continent is there, they have given many reasons for denying it is inhabited. But this opinion is false, and entirely opposed to the truth. My last voyage has proved it, for I have found a continent in that southern part; full of animals and more populous than our Europe, or Asia, or Africa, and even more temperate and pleasant than any other region known to us.

Vespucci's letter was a publishing sensation in Europe that was immediately and repeatedly reprinted in several other countries.

Claudius Ptolemy's Geographia was the basis for most maps made in Renaissance Europe in the 15th century.

Since the Americas were completely absent from Ptolemy's maps, the European encounter with the Americas beginning at the end of the 15th century was a complete surprise. And since Ptolemy had been considered the leading authority on astronomy as well as geography by Europeans, the discovery of the Americas had the effect of calling into question the reliability of his astronomy.

== Astronomy, the first modern science ==
=== De Nova Stella ===
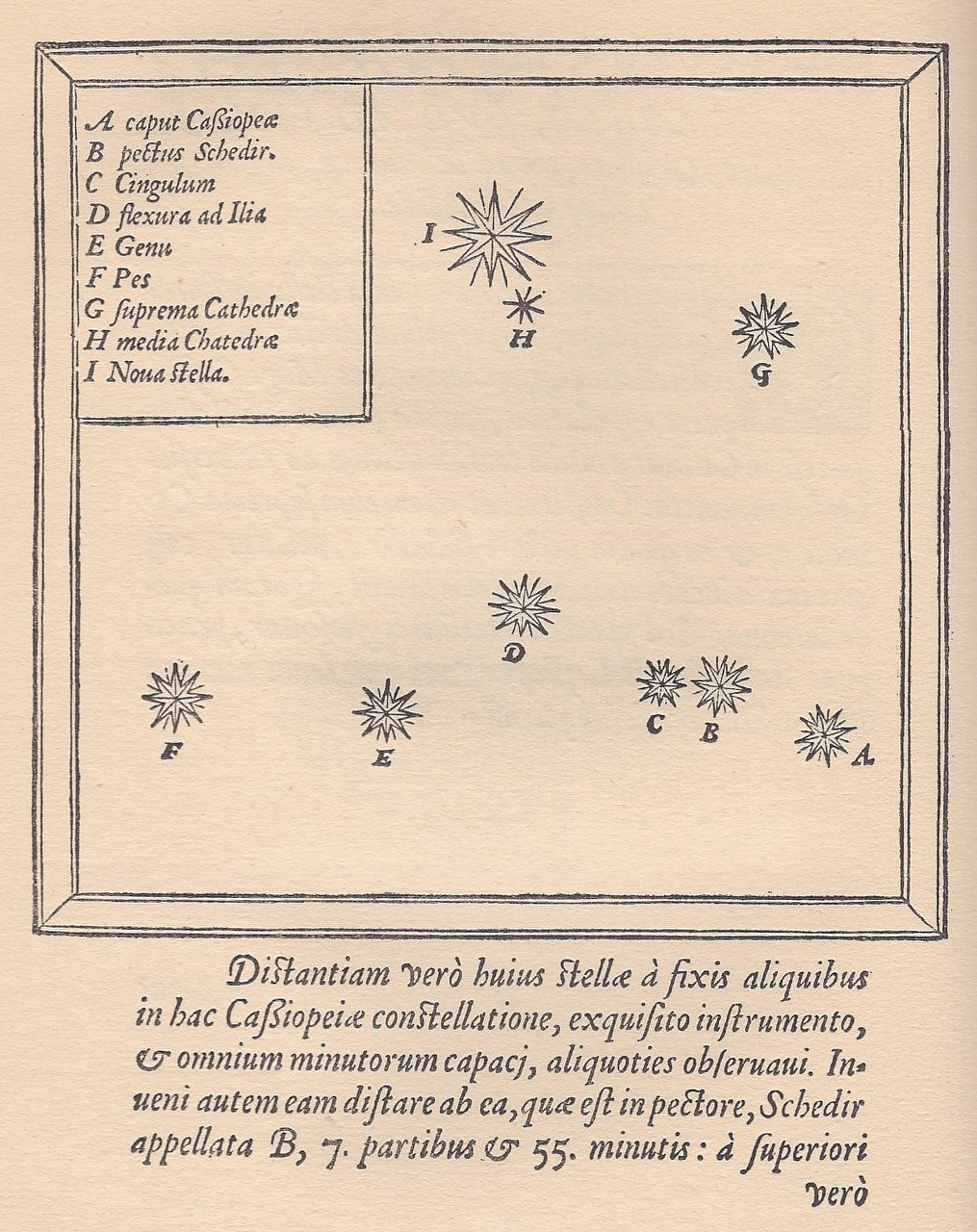
A star map of the constellation Cassiopeia showing the position (labelled I) of the supernova of 1572. From Tycho Brahe's De Nova Stella.

On a fall evening in 1572, just after sunset, a 25-year-old Danish nobleman named Tycho Brahe was looking at the night sky. He wrote about what he saw the following year:

"Last year, on the eleventh of November, in the evening after sunset, while gazing at the stars in a clear sky, as per my custom, I noticed a new and unusual star shining brightly just above my head. To me who, almost since childhood, had known all the stars of the sky perfectly (for there is no great difficulty in this skill), it was quite evident that there had never been any in that place before or, at least, no star of such conspicuous brightness. In the event, I was led to wonder whether, indeed, I could trust my own eyes. In fact, it could be noticed by others that a star appeared in the place I pointed out so I no longer had any doubt."

Brahe knew that what he was seeing could not be a star:

"All philosophers agree, and the very fact makes it plain, that, in the ethereal region of the heavenly world, no modification of creation or corruption takes place. Rather, heaven and the ethereal bodies which are contained therein are not increased, nor diminished, nor varied either in number, or in size, or in magnitude, or in any manner but continue to stay the same in every way over the years. Moreover, observations made by all experts, over thousands of years gone by, assert that stars have always maintained the same number, position, order, motion and quantity, even in our own time by those who take delight in heavenly things."

In Aristotle's cosmology, Earth was the realm of imperfection, inconstancy, irregularity, and change while the heavens (Moon, Sun, planets, stars) were perfect, permanent, unchangeable and, in religious thought, the realm of heavenly beings. So if this was a new object it must be located not in the heavens but in the upper atmosphere - it could not be a star at all. However, Brahe observed that the object showed no daily parallax against the background of the fixed stars. This implied that it was at least farther away than the Moon and those planets that do show such parallax. He found that the object did not change its position relative to the fixed stars over several months, as all planets did in their periodic orbital motions, even the outer planets, for which no daily parallax was detectable. Brahe recorded its position and changing brightness over several months and then published his observations in De Nova Stella in 1573.

=== Astronomia Nova ===
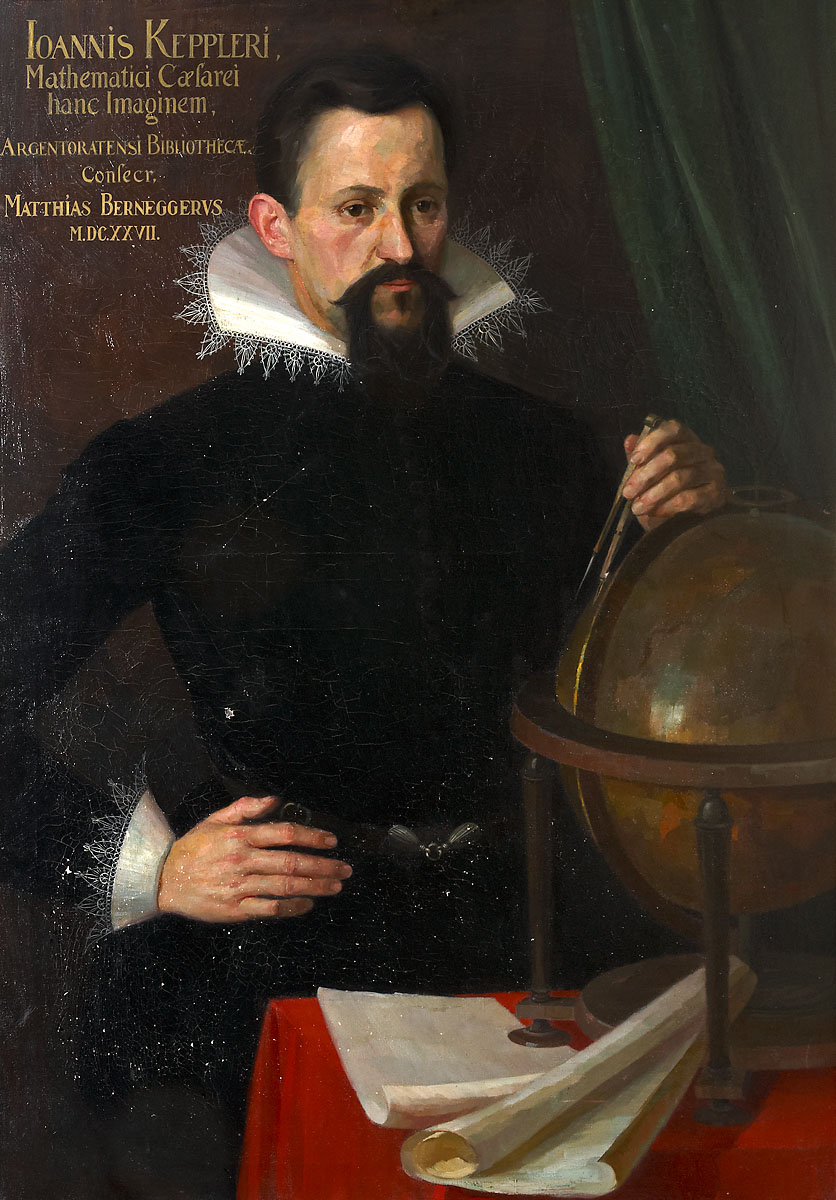
Portrait of Johannes Kepler, one of the founders and fathers of modern astronomy, the scientific method, natural and modern science.

Kepler was an astronomer who is best known for his laws of planetary motion, and Kepler's books Astronomia nova, Harmonice Mundi, and Epitome Astronomiae Copernicanae influenced among others Isaac Newton, providing one of the foundations for his theory of universal gravitation. One of the most significant books in the history of astronomy, the Astronomia nova provided strong arguments for heliocentrism and contributed valuable insight into the movement of the planets. This included the first mention of the planets' elliptical paths and the change of their movement to the movement of free floating bodies as opposed to objects on rotating spheres. It is recognized as one of the most important works of the Scientific Revolution. Using the accurate observations of Tycho Brahe, Kepler proposed that the planets move around the Sun not in circular orbits but in elliptical ones. The science historian A. Rupert Hall identifies Kepler's work as a key milestone of the Scientific Revolution.

=== Starry Messenger ===
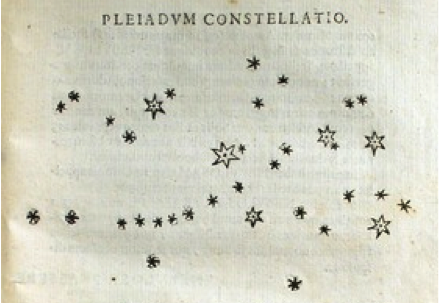
Galileo reported in the Starry Messenger (1610) that he saw at least ten times more stars through the telescope than are visible to the naked eye.

Galileo's main contributions to the acceptance of the heliocentric system were his mechanics, the observations he made with his telescope, as well as his detailed presentation of the case for the system. Using an early theory of inertia, Galileo could explain why rocks dropped from a tower fall straight down even if the Earth rotates. His observations of the moons of Jupiter, the phases of Venus, the spots on the Sun, and mountains on the Moon all helped to discredit the Aristotelian philosophy and the Ptolemaic theory of the Solar System. Through their combined discoveries, the heliocentric system gained support, and at the end of the 17th century it was generally accepted by astronomers.

=== Philosophiæ Naturalis Principia Mathematica ===
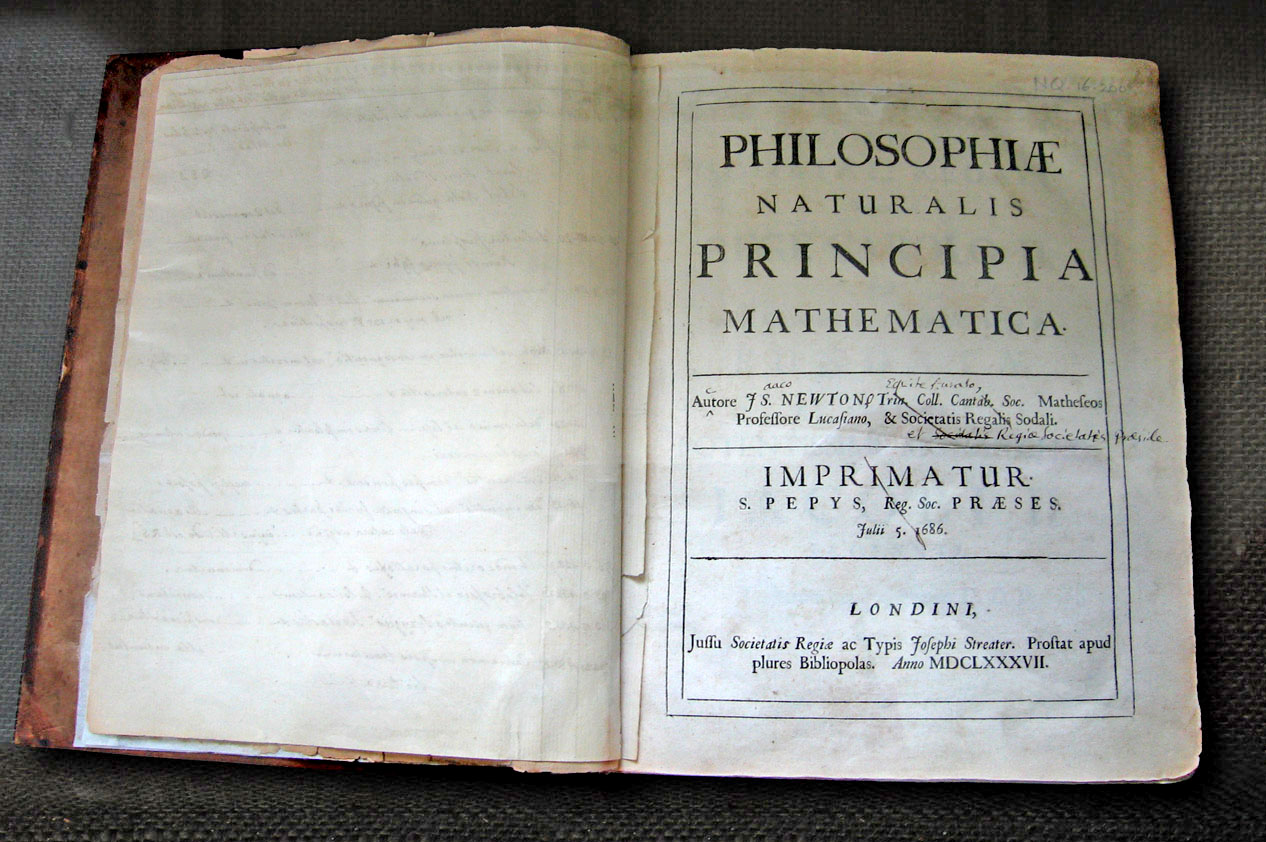
Isaac Newton's Principia developed the first set of unified scientific laws.

In 1679, Newton began to consider gravitation and its effect on the orbits of planets with reference to Kepler's laws of planetary motion. This followed stimulation by a brief exchange of letters in 1679–80 with Hooke, opened a correspondence intended to elicit contributions from Newton to Royal Society transactions. Newton's reawakening interest in astronomical matters received further stimulus by the appearance of a comet in the winter of 1680–81, on which he corresponded with John Flamsteed. After the exchanges with Hooke, Newton worked out proof that the elliptical form of planetary orbits would result from a centripetal force inversely proportional to the square of the radius vector. Newton communicated his results to Edmond Halley and to the Royal Society in De motu corporum in gyrum in 1684. This tract contained the nucleus that Newton developed and expanded to form the Principia.

The Principia was published on 5 July 1687 with encouragement and financial help from Halley. He used the Latin word gravitas (weight) for the effect that would become known as gravity and defined the law of universal gravitation. Newton's postulate of an invisible force able to act over vast distances led to him being criticised for introducing "occult agencies" into science. Later, in the second edition of the Principia (1713), Newton firmly rejected such criticisms in a concluding "General Scholium," writing that it was enough that the phenomena implied a gravitational attraction, as they did; but they did not so far indicate its cause, and it was both unnecessary and improper to frame hypotheses of things that were not implied by the phenomena. (Here Newton used what became his famous expression "hypotheses non fingo").

By deriving Kepler's laws of planetary motion from his mathematical description of gravity, and then using the same principles to account for the trajectories of comets, the tides, the precession of the equinoxes, and other phenomena, Newton removed the last doubts about the validity of the heliocentric model of the cosmos. This work also demonstrated that the motion of objects on Earth and of celestial bodies could be described by the same principles. His prediction that the Earth should be shaped as an oblate spheroid was later vindicated by other scientists. His laws of motion were to be the solid foundation of mechanics; his law of universal gravitation combined terrestrial and celestial mechanics into one great system that seemed to be able to describe the whole world in mathematical formulae, dominating scientists' view of the physical universe for the next three centuries.

== Scientific method ==
Under the scientific method as conceived in the 17th century, natural and artificial circumstances were set aside as a research tradition of systematic experimentation was slowly accepted by the scientific community. The philosophy of using an inductive and mathematical approach to obtain knowledge—to abandon assumption and to attempt to observe with an open mind was championed by René Descartes, Galileo, and Bacon—in contrast with the earlier, Aristotelian approach of deduction, by which analysis of known facts produced further understanding. In practice, many scientists and philosophers believed that a healthy mix of both was needed—the willingness to question assumptions, yet also to interpret observations assumed to have some degree of validity.

By the end of the Scientific Revolution, the qualitative world of book-reading philosophers had been changed into a mechanical, mathematical world to be known through experimental research. Though it is certainly not true that Newtonian science was like modern science in all respects, it conceptually resembled ours in many ways. Many of the hallmarks of modern science, especially with regard to its institutionalization and professionalization, did not become standard until the mid-19th century.

=== Empiricism ===
The Aristotelian scientific tradition's primary mode of interacting with the world was through observation and searching for "natural" circumstances through reasoning. Coupled with this approach was the belief that rare events which seemed to contradict theoretical models were aberrations, telling nothing about nature as it "naturally" was. During the Scientific Revolution, changing perceptions about the role of the scientist in respect to nature, the value of evidence, experimental or observed, led towards a scientific methodology in which empiricism played a large role.

By the start of the Scientific Revolution, empiricism had already become an important component of science and natural philosophy. Prior thinkers, including the early-14th-century nominalist philosopher William of Ockham, had begun the intellectual movement toward empiricism. The term British empiricism came into use to describe philosophical differences perceived between two of its founders Francis Bacon, described as empiricist, and René Descartes, who was described as a rationalist. Thomas Hobbes, George Berkeley, and David Hume were the philosophy's primary exponents who developed a sophisticated empirical tradition as the basis of human knowledge.

An influential formulation of empiricism was John Locke's An Essay Concerning Human Understanding (1689), in which he maintained that the only true knowledge that could be accessible to the human mind was that which was based on experience. He wrote that the human mind was created as a tabula rasa, a "blank tablet," upon which sensory impressions were recorded and built up knowledge through a process of reflection.

=== Bacon's contributions ===
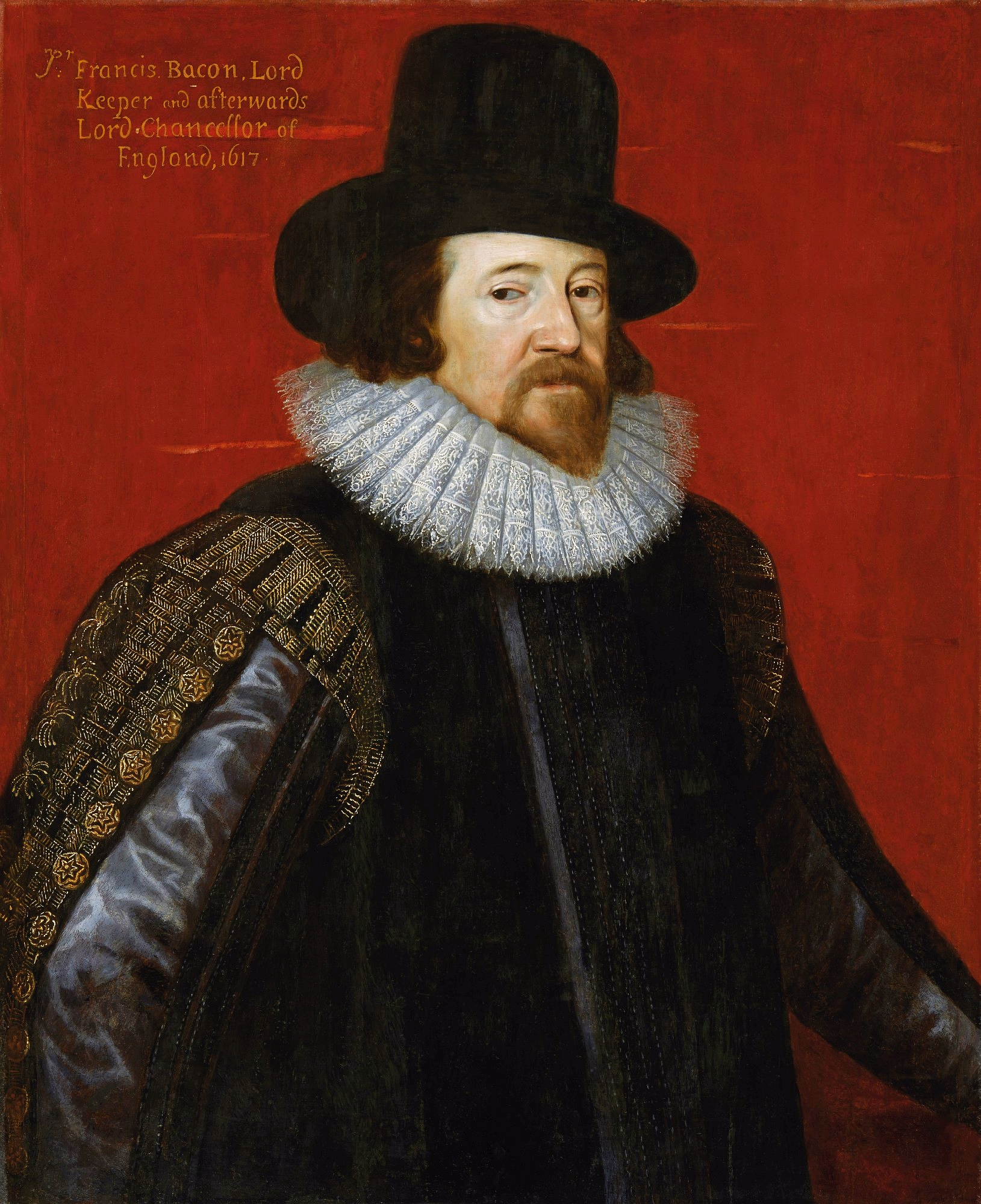
Francis Bacon was a pivotal figure in establishing the scientific method of investigation. Portrait by Frans Pourbus the Younger (1617).

The philosophical underpinnings of the Scientific Revolution were laid out by Francis Bacon, who has been called the father of empiricism. His works established and popularised inductive methodologies for scientific inquiry, often called the Baconian method, or simply the scientific method. His demand for a planned procedure of investigating all things natural marked a new turn in the rhetorical and theoretical framework for science, much of which still surrounds conceptions of proper methodology today.

Bacon proposed a great reformation of all process of knowledge for the advancement of learning divine and human, which he called Instauratio Magna (The Great Instauration). For Bacon, this reformation would lead to a great advancement in science and a progeny of inventions that would relieve mankind's miseries and needs. His Novum Organum was published in 1620, in which he argues man is "the minister and interpreter of nature," "knowledge and human power are synonymous," "effects are produced by the means of instruments and helps," "man while operating can only apply or withdraw natural bodies; nature internally performs the rest," and "nature can only be commanded by obeying her". Here is an abstract of the philosophy of this work, that by the knowledge of nature and the using of instruments, man can govern or direct the natural work of nature to produce definite results. Therefore, that man, by seeking knowledge of nature, can reach power over it—and thus reestablish the "Empire of Man over creation," which had been lost by the Fall together with man's original purity. In this way, he believed, would mankind be raised above conditions of helplessness, poverty and misery, while coming into a condition of peace, prosperity and security.

For this purpose of obtaining knowledge of and power over nature, Bacon outlined in this work a new system of logic he believed to be superior to the old ways of syllogism, developing his scientific method, consisting of procedures for isolating the formal cause of a phenomenon (heat, for example) through eliminative induction. For him, the philosopher should proceed through inductive reasoning from fact to axiom to physical law. Before beginning this induction, though, the enquirer must free his or her mind from certain false notions or tendencies which distort the truth. In particular, he found that philosophy was too preoccupied with words, particularly discourse and debate, rather than actually observing the material world: "For while men believe their reason governs words, in fact, words turn back and reflect their power upon the understanding, and so render philosophy and science sophistical and inactive."

Bacon considered that it is of greatest importance to science not to keep doing intellectual discussions or seeking merely contemplative aims, but that it should work for the bettering of mankind's life by bringing forth new inventions, even stating "inventions are also, as it were, new creations and imitations of divine works". He explored the far-reaching and world-changing character of inventions, such as the printing press, gunpowder and the compass. Despite his influence on scientific methodology, he rejected correct novel theories such as William Gilbert's magnetism, Copernicus's heliocentrism, and Kepler's laws of planetary motion.

=== Scientific experimentation ===
Bacon first described the experimental method.

There remains simple experience; which, if taken as it comes, is called accident, if sought for, experiment. The true method of experience first lights the candle [hypothesis], and then by means of the candle shows the way [arranges and delimits the experiment]; commencing as it does with experience duly ordered and digested, not bungling or erratic, and from it deducing axioms [theories], and from established axioms again new experiments.

— Francis Bacon. Novum Organum. 1620.

Gilbert was an early advocate of this method. He passionately rejected both the prevailing Aristotelian philosophy and the scholastic method of university teaching. His book De Magnete was written in 1600, and he is regarded by some as the father of electricity and magnetism. In this work, he describes many of his experiments with his model Earth called the terrella. From these experiments, he concluded that the Earth was itself magnetic and that this was the reason compasses point north.

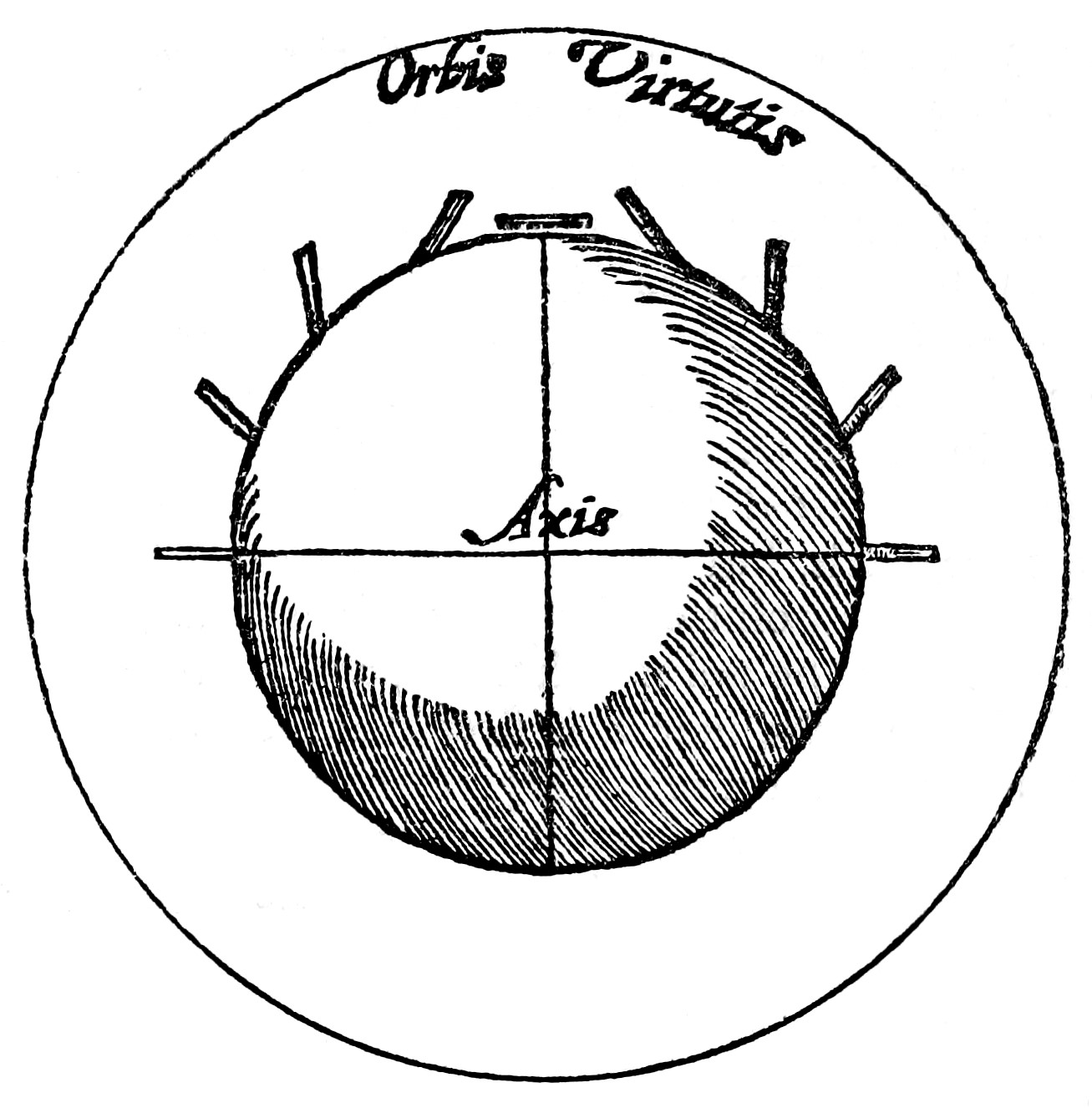
Diagram from William Gilbert's De Magnete, a pioneering 1600 work of experimental science.

De Magnete was influential because of the inherent interest of its subject matter as well as for the rigorous way in which Gilbert describes his experiments and his rejection of ancient theories of magnetism. According to Thomas Thomson, "Gilbert['s]... book on magnetism published in 1600, is one of the finest examples of inductive philosophy that has ever been presented to the world. It is the more remarkable, because it preceded the Novum Organum of Bacon, in which the inductive method of philosophizing was first explained."

Galileo was one of the first modern thinkers to clearly state that the laws of nature are mathematical. In The Assayer he wrote "Philosophy is written in this grand book, the universe ... It is written in the language of mathematics, and its characters are triangles, circles, and other geometric figures;...." His mathematical analyses are a further development of a tradition employed by late scholastic natural philosophers, which Galileo learned when he studied philosophy. He ignored Aristotelianism. In broader terms, his work marked another step towards the eventual separation of science from both philosophy and religion; a major development in human thought. He was often willing to change his views in accordance with observation. In order to perform his experiments, Galileo had to set up standards of length and time, so that measurements made on different days and in different laboratories could be compared in a reproducible fashion. This provided a reliable foundation on which to confirm mathematical laws using inductive reasoning.

Galileo showed an appreciation for the relationship between mathematics, theoretical physics, and experimental physics. He understood the parabola, both in terms of conic sections and in terms of the ordinate (y) varying as the square of the abscissa (x). Galileo further asserted that the parabola was the theoretically ideal trajectory of a uniformly accelerated projectile in the absence of friction and other disturbances. He conceded that there are limits to the validity of this theory, noting on theoretical grounds that a projectile trajectory of a size comparable to that of the Earth could not possibly be a parabola, but he nevertheless maintained that for distances up to the range of the artillery of his day, the deviation of a projectile's trajectory from a parabola would be only very slight.

=== Mathematization ===
Scientific knowledge, according to the Aristotelians, was concerned with establishing true and necessary causes of things. To the extent that medieval natural philosophers used mathematical problems, they limited social studies to theoretical analyses of local speed and other aspects of life. The actual measurement of a physical quantity, and the comparison of that measurement to a value computed on the basis of theory, was largely limited to the mathematical disciplines of astronomy and optics in Europe.

In the 16th and 17th centuries, European scientists began increasingly applying quantitative measurements to the measurement of physical phenomena on the Earth. Galileo maintained strongly that mathematics provided a kind of necessary certainty that could be compared to God's: "...with regard to those few [mathematical propositions] which the human intellect does understand, I believe its knowledge equals the Divine in objective certainty..."

Galileo anticipates the concept of a systematic mathematical interpretation of the world in his book Il Saggiatore:

Philosophy [i.e., physics] is written in this grand book—I mean the universe—which stands continually open to our gaze, but it cannot be understood unless one first learns to comprehend the language and interpret the characters in which it is written. It is written in the language of mathematics, and its characters are triangles, circles, and other geometrical figures, without which it is humanly impossible to understand a single word of it; without these, one is wandering around in a dark labyrinth.

In 1591, François Viète published In Artem Analyticem Isagoge, which gave the first symbolic notation of parameters in algebra. In 1637, René Descartes greatly improved the scope and formalization of algebra in La Géométrie. Newton's development of infinitesimal calculus opened up new applications of the methods of mathematics to science. Newton taught that scientific theory should be coupled with rigorous experimentation, which became the keystone of modern science.

=== Mechanical philosophy ===
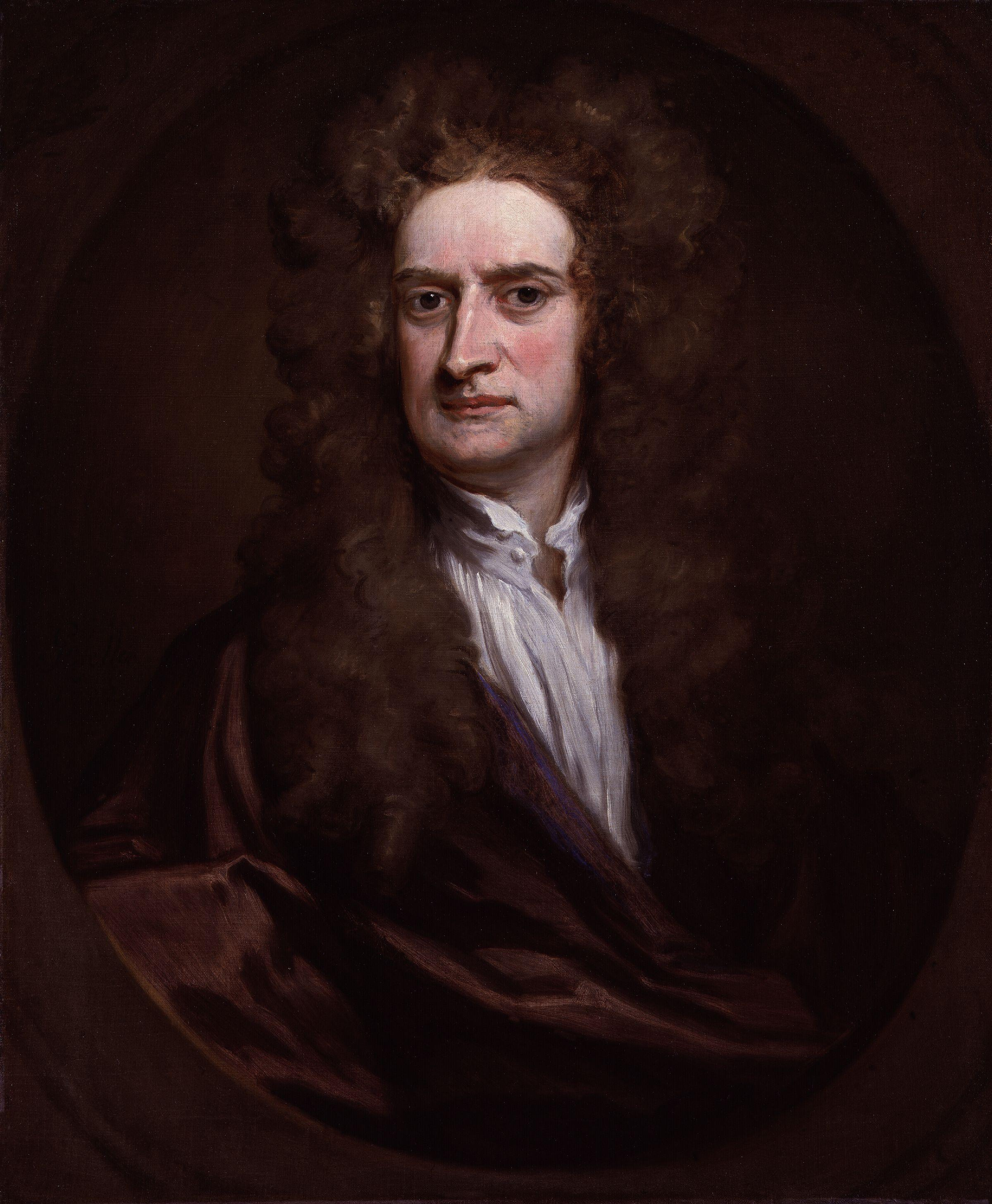
Isaac Newton in a 1702 portrait by Godfrey Kneller

Aristotle recognized four kinds of causes, and where applicable, the most important of them is the "final cause". The final cause was the aim, goal, or purpose of some natural process or man-made thing. Until the Scientific Revolution, it was very natural to see such aims, such as a child's growth, for example, leading to a mature adult. Intelligence was assumed only in the purpose of man-made artifacts; it was not attributed to other animals or to nature.

In "mechanical philosophy" no field or action at a distance is permitted, particles or corpuscles of matter are fundamentally inert. Motion is caused by direct physical collision. Where natural substances had previously been understood organically, the mechanical philosophers viewed them as machines. As a result, Newton's theory seemed like some kind of throwback to "spooky action at a distance". According to Thomas Kuhn, Newton and Descartes held the teleological principle that God conserved the amount of motion in the universe:

Gravity, interpreted as an innate attraction between every pair of particles of matter, was an occult quality in the same sense as the scholastics' "tendency to fall" had been.... By the mid eighteenth century that interpretation had been almost universally accepted, and the result was a genuine reversion (which is not the same as a retrogression) to a scholastic standard. Innate attractions and repulsions joined size, shape, position and motion as physically irreducible primary properties of matter.

Newton had also specifically attributed the inherent power of inertia to matter, against the mechanist thesis that matter has no inherent powers. But whereas Newton vehemently denied gravity was an inherent power of matter, his collaborator Roger Cotes made gravity also an inherent power of matter, as set out in his famous preface to the Principia's 1713 second edition which he edited, and contradicted Newton. And it was Cotes's interpretation of gravity rather than Newton's that came to be accepted.

=== Institutionalization ===
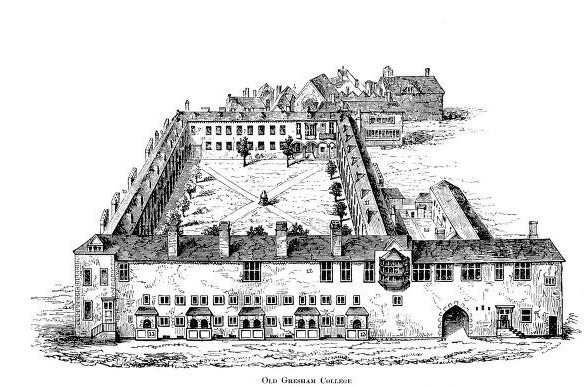
The Royal Society had its origins in Gresham College in the City of London, and was the first scientific society in the world.

The first moves towards the institutionalization of scientific investigation and dissemination took the form of the establishment of societies where new discoveries were aired, discussed, and published. The first scientific society to be established was the Royal Society of London. This grew out of an earlier group, centered around Gresham College in the 1640s and 1650s. According to a history of the college:

The scientific network which centered on Gresham College played a crucial part in the meetings which led to the formation of the Royal Society.

These physicians and natural philosophers were influenced by the "new science", as promoted by Bacon in his New Atlantis, from approximately 1645 onwards. A group known as The Philosophical Society of Oxford was run under a set of rules still retained by the Bodleian Library.

On 28 November 1660, the "1660 committee of 12" announced the formation of a "College for the Promoting of Physico-Mathematical Experimental Learning", which would meet weekly to discuss science and run experiments. At the second meeting, Robert Moray announced that King Charles approved of the gatherings, and a royal charter was signed on 15 July 1662 creating the "Royal Society of London", with Lord Brouncker serving as the first president. A second royal charter was signed on 23 April 1663, with the king noted as the founder and with the name of "the Royal Society of London for the Improvement of Natural Knowledge"; Robert Hooke was appointed as curator of experiments in November. This initial royal favour has continued, and since then every monarch has been the patron of the society.

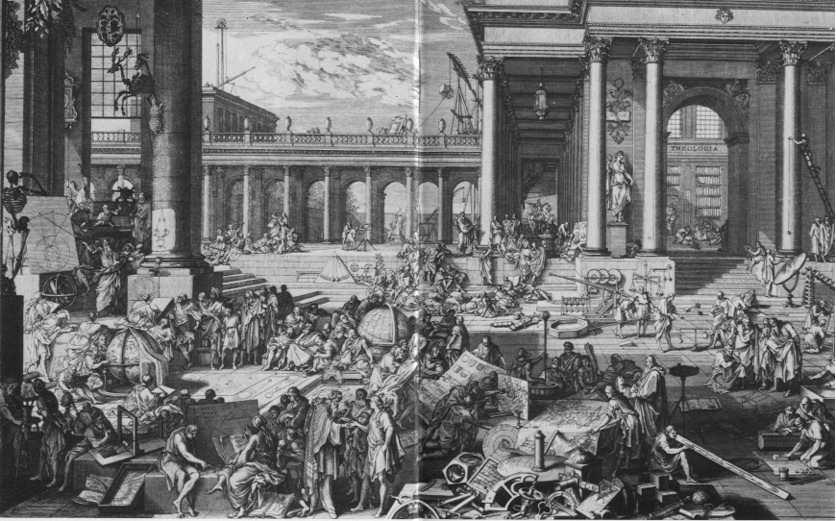
The French Academy of Sciences was established in 1666.

The society's first secretary was Henry Oldenburg. Its early meetings included experiments performed first by Hooke and then by Denis Papin, who was appointed in 1684. These experiments varied in their subject area and were important in some cases and trivial in others. The society began publication of Philosophical Transactions from 1665, the oldest and longest-running scientific journal in the world, which established the important principles of scientific priority and peer review.

The French established the Academy of Sciences in 1666. In contrast to the private origins of its British counterpart, the academy was founded as a government body by Jean-Baptiste Colbert. Its rules were set down in 1699 by King Louis XIV, when it received the name of 'Royal Academy of Sciences' and was installed in the Louvre in Paris.

== New ideas ==
=== Biology and medicine ===
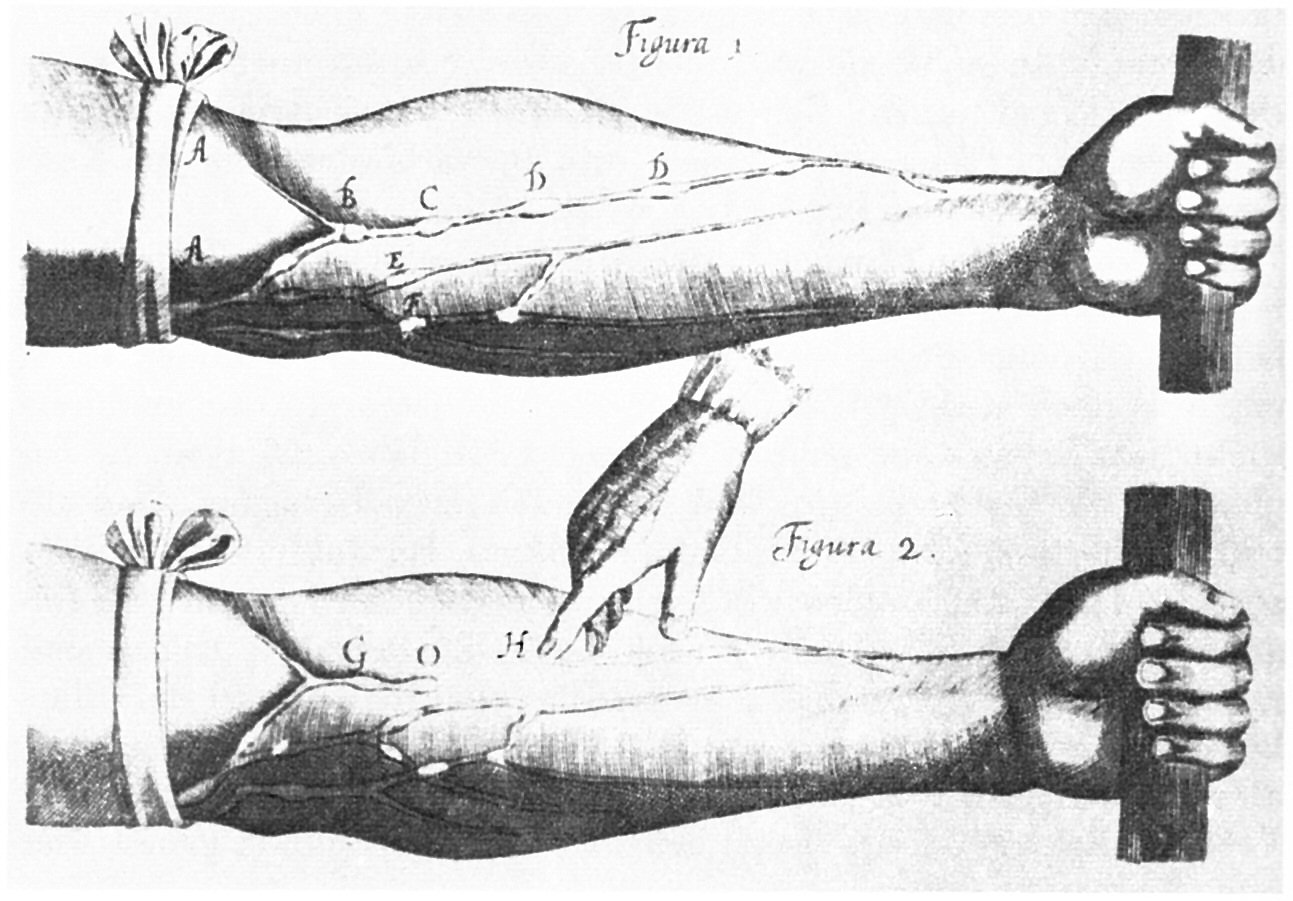
Image of veins from William Harvey's Exercitatio Anatomica de Motu Cordis et Sanguinis in Animalibus. Harvey demonstrated that blood circulated around the body, rather than being created in the liver.

In the 16th century, surgeon Ambroise Paré was a leader in surgical techniques and battlefield medicine, especially the treatment of wounds.

William Harvey published De Motu Cordis in 1628. Harvey made a detailed analysis of the overall structure of the heart, going on to an analysis of the arteries, showing how their pulsation depends upon the contraction of the left ventricle, while the contraction of the right ventricle propels its charge of blood into the pulmonary artery. He noticed that the two ventricles move together almost simultaneously and not independently like had been thought previously by his predecessors.

Harvey estimated the capacity of the heart, how much blood is expelled through each pump of the heart, and the number of times the heart beats in half an hour. From these estimations, he demonstrated that according to Gaelen's theory that blood was continually produced in the liver, the absurdly large figure of 540 pounds of blood would have to be produced every day. Having this simple mathematical proportion at hand—which would imply a seemingly impossible role for the liver—Harvey went on to demonstrate how the blood circulated in a circle by means of countless experiments initially done on serpents and fish: tying their veins and arteries in separate periods of time, Harvey noticed the modifications which occurred; indeed, as he tied the veins, the heart would become empty, while as he did the same to the arteries, the organ would swell up. This process was later performed on the human body: the physician tied a tight ligature onto the upper arm of a person. This would cut off blood flow from the arteries and the veins. When this was done, the arm below the ligature was cool and pale, while above the ligature it was warm and swollen. The ligature was loosened slightly, which allowed blood from the arteries to come into the arm, since arteries are deeper in the flesh than the veins. When this was done, the opposite effect was seen in the lower arm. It was now warm and swollen. The veins were also more visible, since now they were full of blood.

=== Chemistry ===
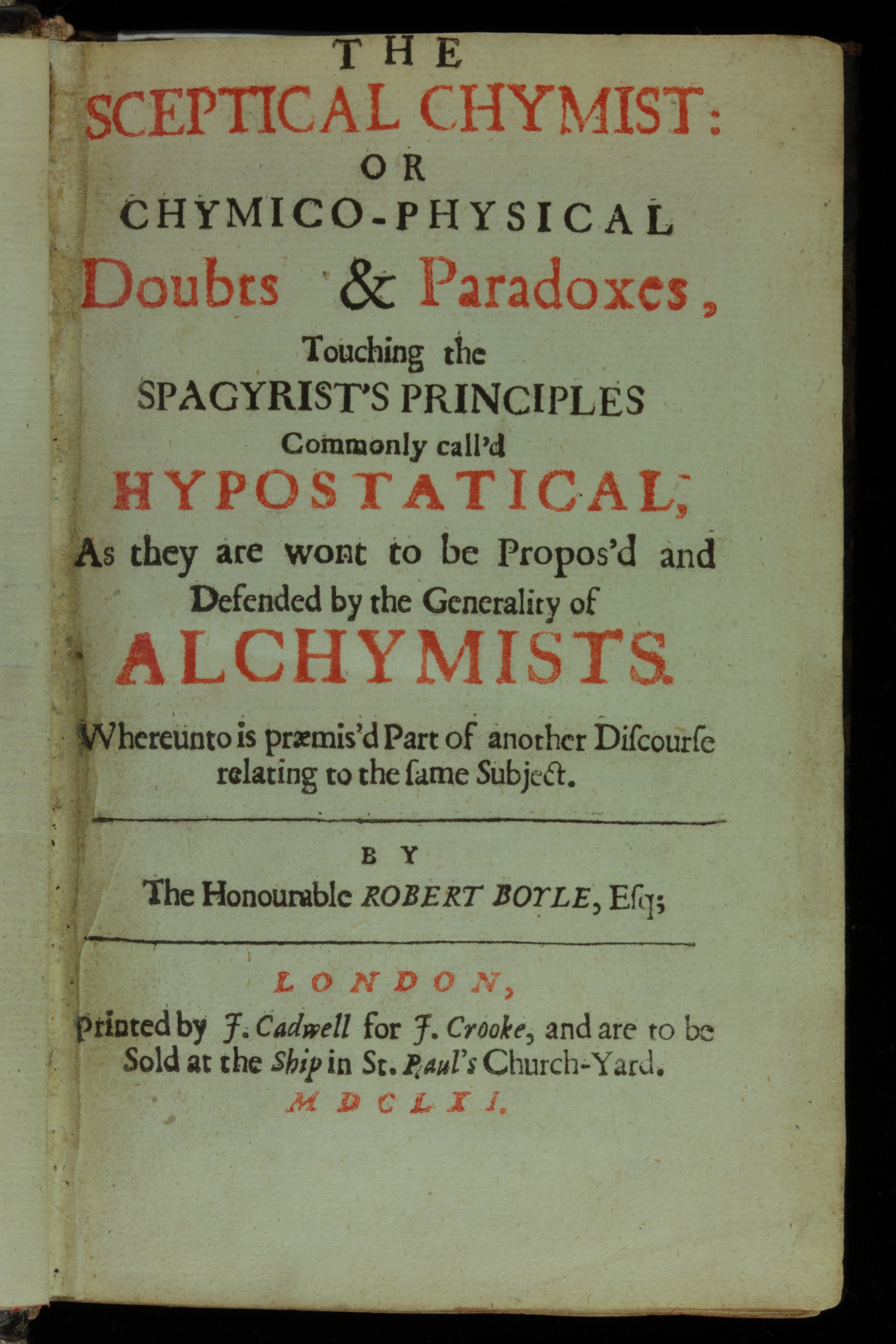
Title page from The Sceptical Chymist, a foundational text of chemistry, written by Robert Boyle in 1661.

Chemistry, and its antecedent alchemy, became an increasingly important aspect of scientific thought in the course of the 16th and 17th centuries. The importance of chemistry is indicated by the range of important scholars who actively engaged in chemical research. Among them were the astronomer Tycho Brahe, the chemical physician Paracelsus, Robert Boyle, Thomas Browne and Isaac Newton. Unlike the mechanical philosophy, the chemical philosophy stressed the active powers of matter, which alchemists frequently expressed in terms of vital or active principles—of spirits operating in nature.

Practical attempts to improve the refining of ores and their extraction to smelt metals were an important source of information for early chemists in the 16th century, among them Georgius Agricola, who published his great work De re metallica in 1556. His work describes the highly developed and complex processes of mining metal ores, metal extraction and metallurgy of the time. His approach removed the mysticism associated with the subject, creating the practical base upon which others could build.

Chemist Robert Boyle is considered to have refined the modern scientific method for alchemy and to have separated chemistry further from alchemy. Although his research clearly has its roots in the alchemical tradition, Boyle is largely regarded today as the first modern chemist and therefore one of the founders of modern chemistry, and one of the pioneers of modern experimental scientific method. Although Boyle was not the original discoverer, he is best known for Boyle's law, which he presented in 1662: the law describes the inversely proportional relationship between the absolute pressure and volume of a gas, if the temperature is kept constant within a closed system.

Boyle is also credited for his landmark publication The Sceptical Chymist in 1661, which is seen as a cornerstone book in the field of chemistry. In the work, Boyle presents his hypothesis that every phenomenon was the result of collisions of particles in motion. Boyle appealed to chemists to experiment and asserted that experiments denied the limiting of chemical elements to only the classic four: earth, fire, air, and water. He also pleaded that chemistry should cease to be subservient to medicine or to alchemy, and rise to the status of a science. Importantly, he advocated a rigorous approach to scientific experiment: he believed all theories must be tested experimentally before being regarded as true. The work contains some of the earliest modern ideas of atoms, molecules, and chemical reaction, and marks the beginning of modern chemistry.

=== Physical ===
==== Optics ====
In 1604 Johannes Kepler published Astronomiae Pars Optica (The Optical Part of Astronomy). In it, he describes the inverse-square law governing the intensity of light, reflection by flat and curved mirrors, and principles of pinhole cameras, as well as the astronomical implications of optics such as parallax and the apparent sizes of heavenly bodies. Astronomiae Pars Optica is generally recognized as the foundation of modern optics.

Willebrord Snellius found the mathematical law of refraction, now known as Snell's law, in 1621. It had been published earlier in 984 AD by Ibn Sahl. Subsequently, René Descartes showed, by using geometric construction and the law of refraction (also known as Descartes's law), that the angular radius of a rainbow is 42° (i.e. the angle subtended at the eye by the edge of the rainbow and the rainbow's centre is 42°). He also independently discovered the law of reflection, and his essay on optics was the first published mention of this law. Christiaan Huygens wrote several works in the area of optics. These included the Opera reliqua (also known as Christiani Hugenii Zuilichemii, dum viveret Zelhemii toparchae, opuscula posthuma) and the Traité de la lumière.

Newton investigated the refraction of light, demonstrating that a prism could decompose white light into a spectrum of colours, and that a lens and a second prism could recompose the multicoloured spectrum into white light. He also showed that the coloured light does not change its properties by separating out a coloured beam and shining it on various objects. Newton noted that regardless of whether it was reflected or scattered or transmitted, it stayed the same colour. Thus, he observed that colour is the result of objects interacting with already-coloured light rather than objects generating the colour themselves. This is known as Newton's theory of colour. From this work he concluded that any refracting telescope would suffer from the dispersion of light into colours. The interest of the Royal Society encouraged him to publish his notes On Colour. Newton argued that light is composed of particles or corpuscles and that are refracted by accelerating toward the denser medium, but he had to associate them with waves to explain the diffraction of light.

In his Hypothesis of Light of 1675, Newton posited the existence of the ether to transmit forces between particles. In 1704, Newton published Opticks, in which he expounded his corpuscular theory of light. He considered light to be made up of extremely subtle corpuscles, that ordinary matter was made of grosser corpuscles and speculated that through a kind of alchemical transmutation "Are not gross Bodies and Light convertible into one another, ...and may not Bodies receive much of their Activity from the Particles of Light which enter their Composition?"

Antonie van Leeuwenhoek constructed powerful single lens microscopes and made extensive observations that he published around 1660, paving the way for the science of microbiology.

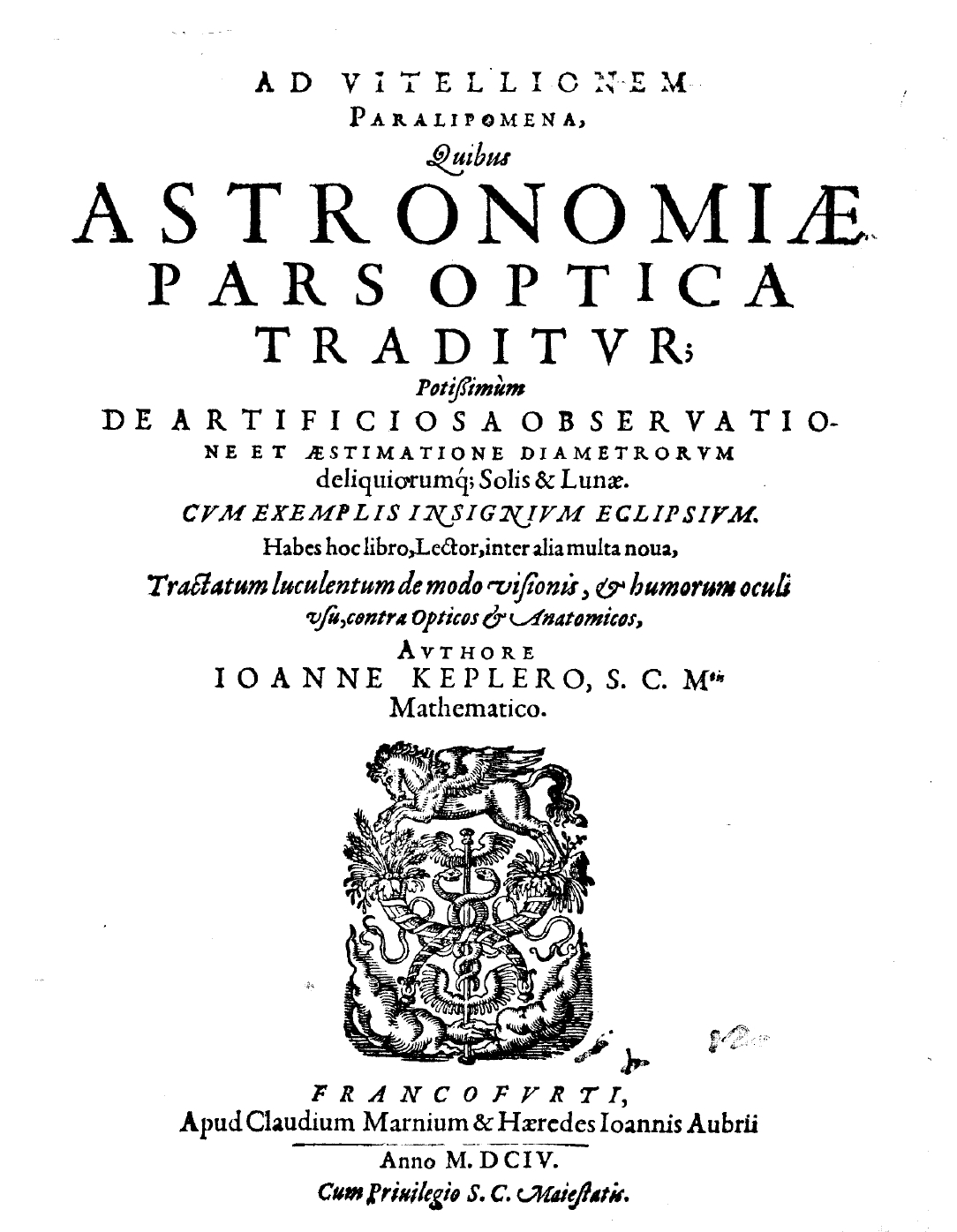
The first treatise about optics by Johannes Kepler, Ad Vitellionem paralipomena quibus astronomiae pars optica traditur (1604)

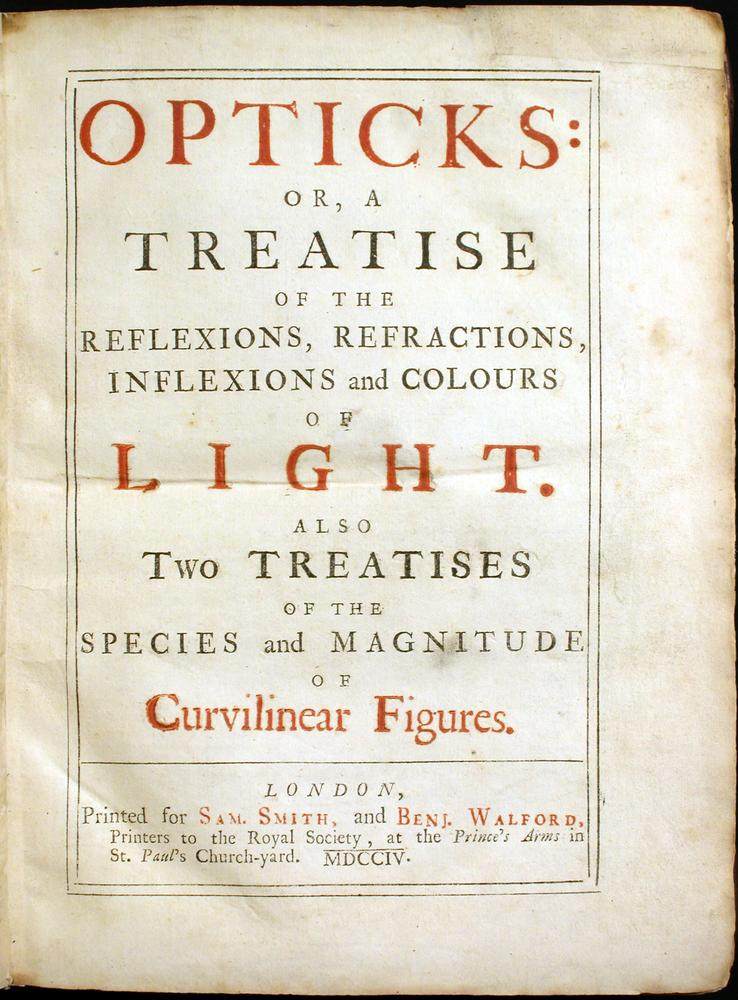
Isaac Newton's 1704 Opticks: or, A Treatise of the Reflexions, Refractions, Inflexions and Colours of Light

==== Electricity ====
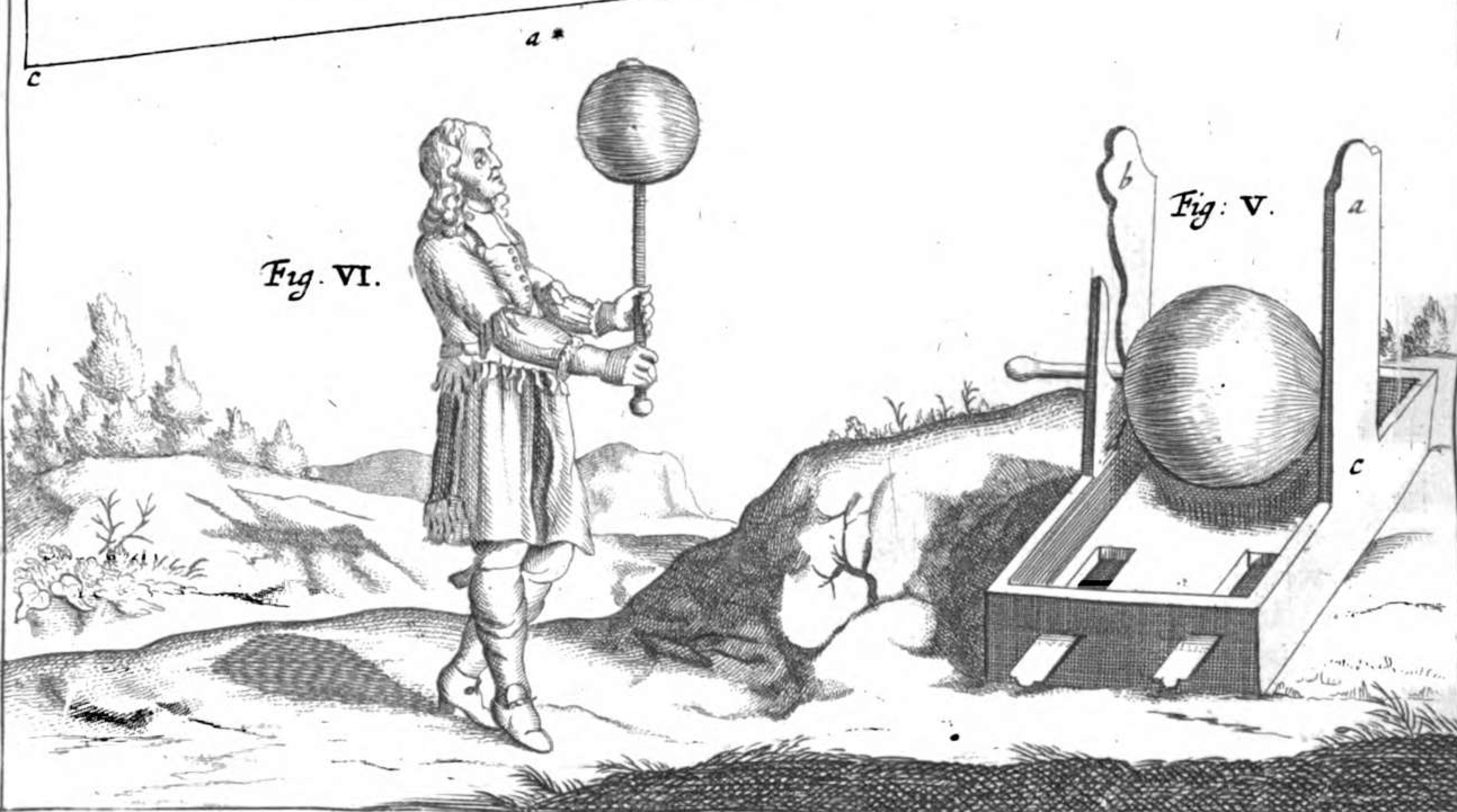
Otto von Guericke's experiments on electrostatics, published 1672

William Gilbert, in De Magnete, invented the Neo-Latin word electricus from ἤλεκτρον (elektron), the Greek word for "amber". Gilbert undertook a number of careful electrical experiments, in the course of which he discovered that many substances other than amber, such as sulphur, wax, glass, etc., were capable of manifesting electrical properties. Gilbert discovered that a heated body lost its electricity and that moisture prevented the electrification of all bodies. He noticed that electrified substances attracted all other substances indiscriminately, whereas a magnet only attracted iron. The many discoveries of this nature earned Gilbert the title founder of the electrical science. By investigating the forces on a light metallic needle, balanced on a point, he extended the list of electric bodies and found that many substances, including metals and natural magnets, showed no attractive forces when rubbed. He noticed that dry weather with north or east wind was the most favourable atmospheric condition for exhibiting electric phenomena—an observation liable to misconception until the difference between conductor and insulator was understood.

Robert Boyle worked frequently at the new science of electricity and added several substances to Gilbert's list of electrics. He left a detailed account of his researches under the title of Experiments on the Origin of Electricity. In 1675 Boyle stated that electric attraction and repulsion can act across a vacuum. One of his important discoveries was that electrified bodies in a vacuum would attract light substances, this indicating that the electrical effect did not depend upon the air as a medium.

This was followed in 1660 by Otto von Guericke, who invented an early electrostatic generator. By the end of the 17th century, researchers had developed practical means of generating electricity by friction with an electrostatic generator, but the development of electrostatic machines did not begin in earnest until the 18th century when they became fundamental instruments in the studies about the science of electricity. The first usage of the word electricity is ascribed to Thomas Browne in his 1646 work Pseudodoxia Epidemica. In 1729 Stephen Gray demonstrated that electricity could be "transmitted" through metal filaments.

== Mechanical devices ==
As an aid to scientific investigation, various tools, measuring aids and calculating devices were developed in this period.

=== Calculating devices ===
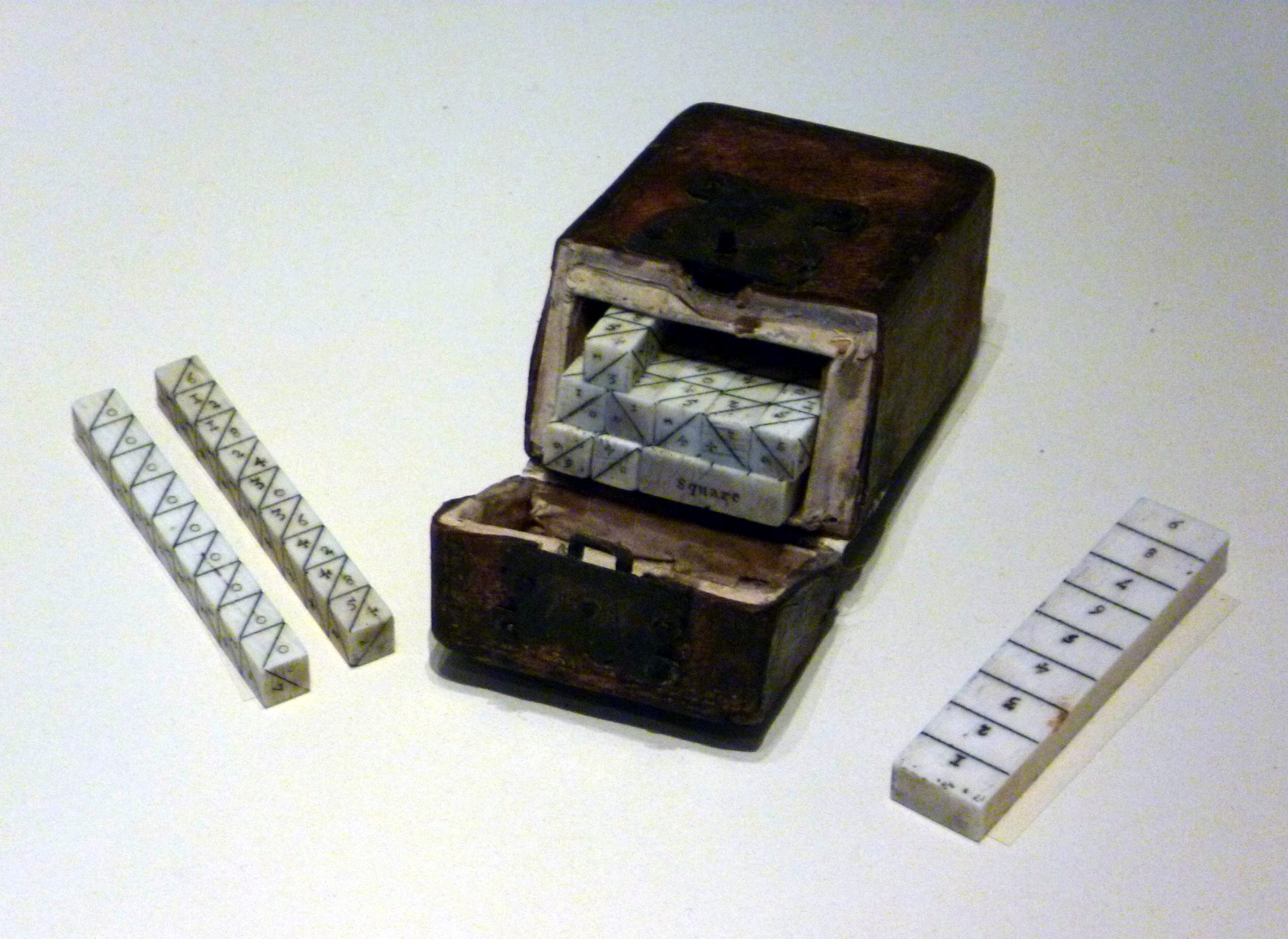
An ivory set of Napier's Bones, an early calculating device invented by John Napier

John Napier introduced logarithms as a powerful mathematical tool. With the help of Henry Briggs their logarithmic tables embodied a computational advance that made calculations by hand much quicker. His Napier's bones used a set of numbered rods as a multiplication tool using the system of lattice multiplication. The way was opened to later scientific advances, particularly in astronomy and dynamics.

At Oxford University, Edmund Gunter built the first analog device to aid computation. The 'Gunter's scale' was a large plane scale, engraved with various scales, or lines. Natural lines, such as the line of chords, the line of sines and tangents are placed on one side of the scale and the corresponding artificial or logarithmic ones were on the other side. This calculating aid was a predecessor of the slide rule. It was William Oughtred who first used two such scales sliding by one another to perform direct multiplication and division and thus is credited as the inventor of the slide rule in 1622.

Blaise Pascal invented the mechanical calculator in 1642. The introduction of his Pascaline in 1645 launched the development of mechanical calculators first in Europe and then all over the world. Gottfried Leibniz, building on Pascal's work, became one of the most prolific inventors in the field of mechanical calculators; he was the first to describe a pinwheel calculator in 1685, and he invented the Leibniz wheel, used in the arithmometer, the first mass-produced mechanical calculator. He also refined the binary number system, the foundation of virtually all modern computer architectures.

John Hadley was the inventor of the octant, the precursor to the sextant (invented by John Bird), which greatly improved the science of navigation.

=== Industrial machines ===
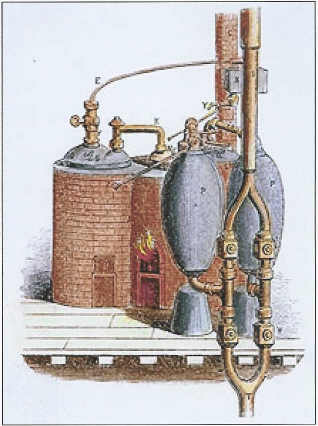
The 1698 Savery Engine was the first successful steam engine.

Denis Papin was best known for his pioneering invention of the steam digester, the forerunner of the steam engine. The first working steam engine was patented in 1698 by the English inventor Thomas Savery, as a "...new invention for raising of water and occasioning motion to all sorts of mill work by the impellent force of fire, which will be of great use and advantage for drayning mines, serveing townes with water, and for the working of all sorts of mills where they have not the benefitt of water nor constant windes." The invention was demonstrated to the Royal Society on 14 June 1699, and the machine was described by Savery in his book The Miner's Friend; or, An Engine to Raise Water by Fire (1702), in which he claimed that it could pump water out of mines. Thomas Newcomen perfected the practical steam engine for pumping water, the Newcomen steam engine. Consequently, Newcomen can be regarded as a forefather of the Industrial Revolution.

Abraham Darby I was the first, and most famous, of three generations of the Darby family who played an important role in the Industrial Revolution. He developed a method of producing high-grade iron in a blast furnace fueled by coke rather than charcoal. This was a major step forward in the production of iron as a raw material for the Industrial Revolution.

=== Telescopes ===
Refracting telescopes first appeared in the Netherlands in 1608, apparently the product of spectacle makers experimenting with lenses. The inventor is unknown, but Hans Lipperhey applied for the first patent, followed by Jacob Metius of Alkmaar. Galileo was one of the first scientists to use this tool for his astronomical observations in 1609. The reflecting telescope was described by James Gregory in his book Optica Promota (1663). He argued that a parabolic mirror would eliminate the spherical aberration inherent in then-known reflecting telescope designs having spherical mirrors. It was not until ten years after Gregory's publication, aided by the interest of experimental scientist Robert Hooke, that a working Gregorian telescope was built.

In 1666, Newton argued that the faults of the refracting telescope were fundamental because the lens refracted light of different colors differently. He concluded that light could not be refracted through a lens without causing chromatic aberrations. From these experiments Newton concluded that no improvement could be made in the refracting telescope. However, he was able to demonstrate that the angle of reflection remained the same for all colors, so he decided to build a reflecting telescope. It was completed in 1668 and is the earliest known functional reflecting telescope. 50 years later, Hadley developed ways to make precision aspheric and parabolic objective mirrors for reflecting telescopes, building the first parabolic Newtonian telescope and a Gregorian telescope with accurately shaped mirrors. These were successfully demonstrated to the Royal Society.

=== Other devices ===
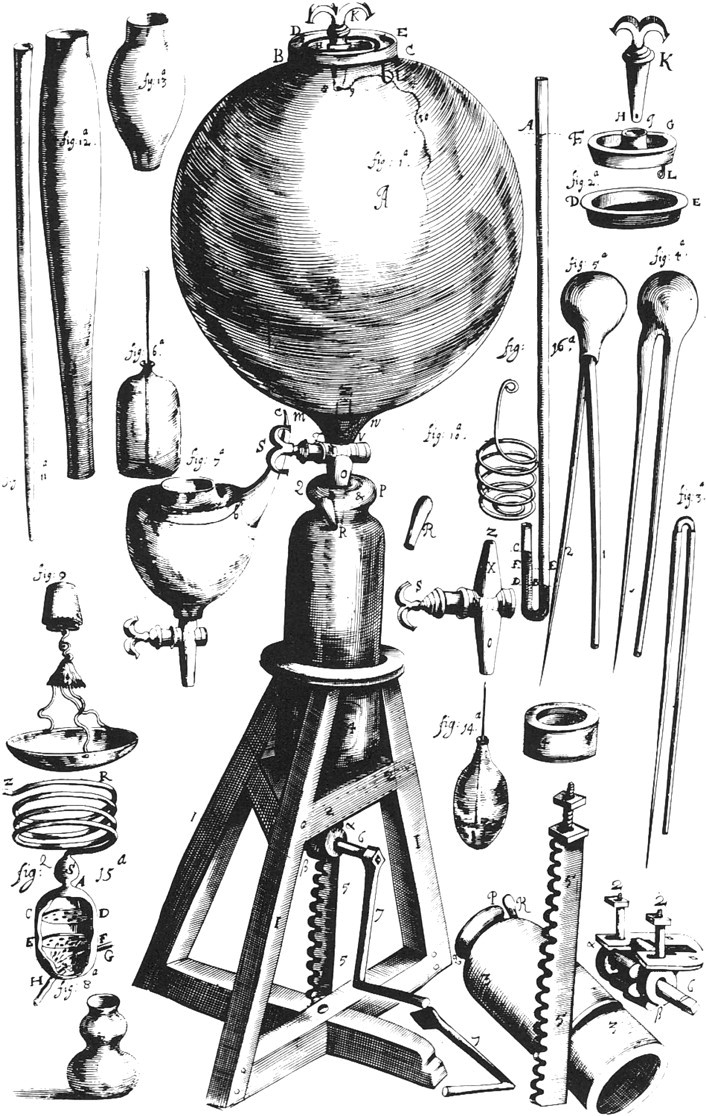
Air pump built by Robert Boyle. Many new instruments were devised in this period, which greatly aided in the expansion of scientific knowledge.

The invention of the vacuum pump paved the way for the experiments of Robert Boyle and Robert Hooke into the nature of vacuum and atmospheric pressure. The first such device was made by Otto von Guericke in 1654. It consisted of a piston and an air gun cylinder with flaps that could suck the air from any vessel that it was connected to. In 1657, he pumped the air out of two conjoined hemispheres and demonstrated that a team of sixteen horses were incapable of pulling it apart. The air pump construction was greatly improved by Hooke in 1658.

Evangelista Torricelli invented the mercury barometer in 1643. The motivation for the invention was to improve on the suction pumps that were used to raise water out of the mines. Torricelli constructed a sealed tube filled with mercury, set vertically into a basin of the same substance. The column of mercury fell downwards, leaving a Torricellian vacuum above.

=== Materials, construction, and aesthetics ===
Surviving instruments from this period tend to be made of durable metals such as brass, gold, or steel, although examples such as telescopes made of wood, pasteboard, or with leather components exist. Those instruments that exist in collections today tend to be robust examples, made by skilled craftspeople for and at the expense of wealthy patrons. These may have been commissioned as displays of wealth. In addition, the instruments preserved in collections may not have received heavy use in scientific work; instruments that had visibly received heavy use were typically destroyed, deemed unfit for display, or excluded from collections altogether. It is also postulated that the scientific instruments preserved in many collections were chosen because they were more appealing to collectors, by virtue of being more ornate, more portable, or made with higher-grade materials.

Intact air pumps are particularly rare. The pump at right included a glass sphere to permit demonstrations inside the vacuum chamber, a common use. The base was wooden, and the cylindrical pump was brass. Other vacuum chambers that survived were made of brass hemispheres.

Instrument makers of the late 17th and early 18th centuries were commissioned by organizations seeking help with navigation, surveying, warfare, and astronomical observation. The increase in uses for such instruments, and their widespread use in global exploration and conflict, created a need for new methods of manufacture and repair, which would be met by the Industrial Revolution.

== Criticism ==
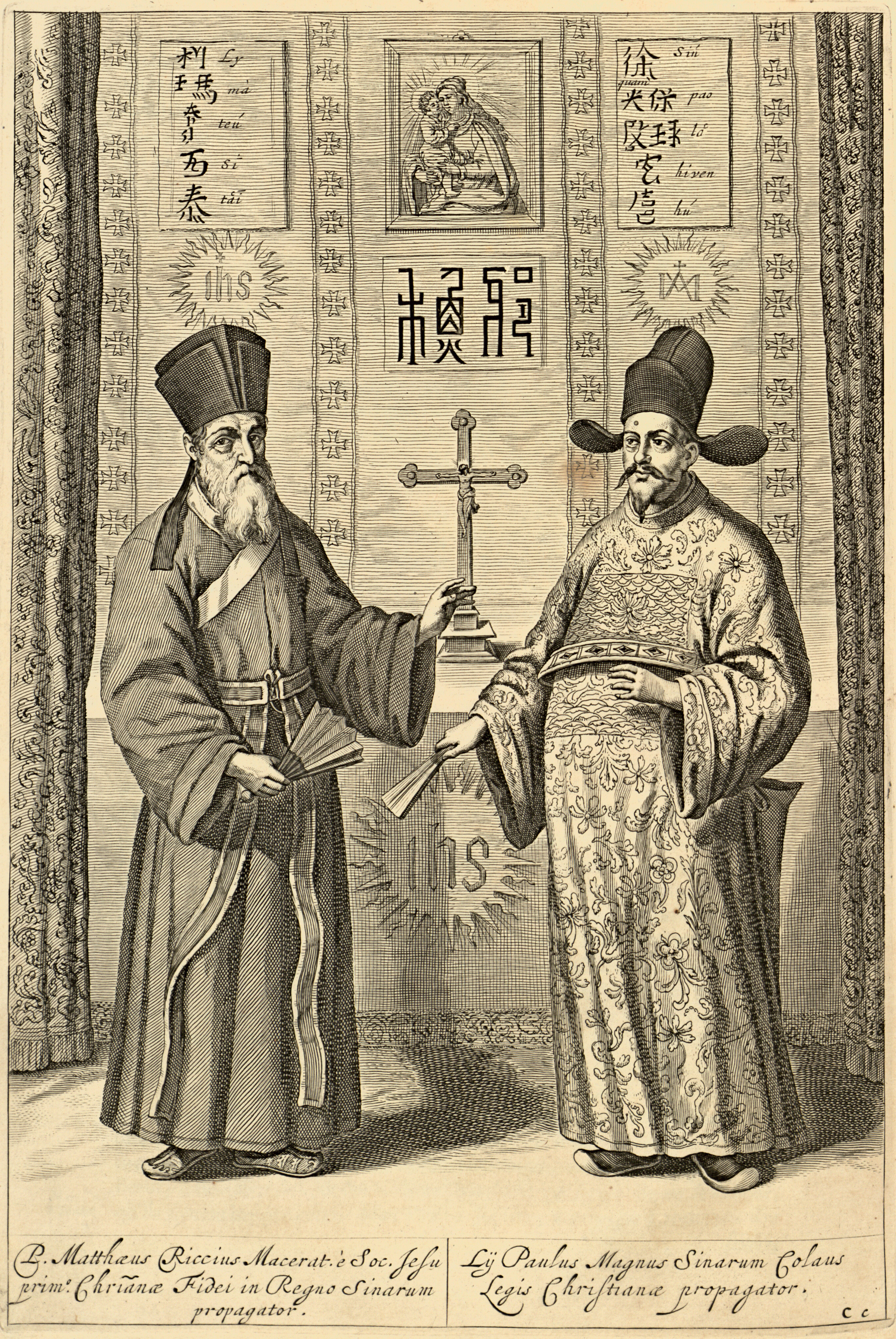
Matteo Ricci (left) and Xu Guangqi (right) in Athanasius Kircher, La Chine ... Illustrée, Amsterdam, 1670.

Historians continue to debate whether the Scientific Revolution was a radical break or a continuation of earlier trends. Champions of the continuity thesis, such as Pierre Duhem, John Hermann Randall, Alistair Crombie and William A. Wallace, argue that the scientific "revolution" is a myth.

Arun Bala suggests the changes involved in the Scientific Revolution were shaped by non-Western influences - Arabic optics, Indian mathematics and Chinese mechanical technologies - which Europeans synthesized into a new framework.

Some scholars have suggested that there was no Scientific Revolution but only an extension of the Renaissance. This view holds that 'modern' breakthroughs were actually just rediscoveries of ancient Greek philosophy and Greek mathematics from figures like Archimedes and Pythagoras. According to this view, no new knowledge was created in the 17th century; everything that seemed new was only a recovery of classical theories that had been eclipsed by Aristotelian orthodoxy.

Finally, recent scholarship challenges the period's male-dominated history by highlighting the marginalization of women from education, the unreliability of historical records, and the significance of scientific advances made in informal settings.

== See also ==
- History of science
- History of astronomy
- History of gravitational theory
- Chemical revolution – Reformulation of chemistry in the 17th and 18th centuries
- History of science and technology in China
- History of science and technology in India
- Science during the Islamic Golden Age – Period of cultural flourishing from 786 to 1258
- Science during the Renaissance
- Science during the Enlightenment – Science during the 16th-19th century
- Industrial Revolution – 1760–1840 agrarian to industrial era shift
- Science and the Catholic Church
- The Structure of Scientific Revolutions (book)
- Burns, William E. (2016). The Scientific Revolution in Global Perspective Oxford University Press. xv + 198 pp.
- Cohen, H. Floris (2015). The Rise of Modern Science Explained: A Comparative History. Cambridge University Press. vi + 296 pp.
- Grant, E. (1996). The Foundations of Modern Science in the Middle Ages: Their Religious, Institutional, and Intellectual Contexts. Cambridge Univ. Press. ISBN 978-0-521-56762-6.
- Hannam, James (2011). The Genesis of Science. Regnery. ISBN 978-1-59698-155-3.
- Henry, John (2008). The Scientific Revolution and the Origins of Modern Science. 176 pp.
- Knight, David (2014). Voyaging in Strange Seas: The Great Revolution in Science. Yale University Press. viii + 329 pp.
- Lindberg, D. C. (1992). The Beginnings of Western Science: The European Scientific Tradition in Philosophical, Religious, and Institutional Context, 600 B.C. to A.D. 1450. Univ. of Chicago Press.
- Lyons, Martyn (2011). Books: A Living History. Los Angeles: The J. Paul Getty Museum. ISBN 978-1-60606-083-4.
- Pedersen, Olaf (1993). Early Physics and Astronomy: A Historical Introduction. Cambridge Univ. Press. ISBN 978-0-521-40899-8.
- Sharratt, Michael (1994). Galileo: Decisive Innovator. Cambridge: Cambridge University Press. ISBN 978-0-521-56671-1.
- Shapin, Steven (1996). The Scientific Revolution. Chicago: Chicago University Press. ISBN 978-0-226-75020-0.
- Weinberg, Steven (2015). To Explain the World: The Discovery of Modern Science. xiv + 417 pp.
- Westfall, Richard S. (1983). Never at Rest: A Biography of Isaac Newton.
- Westfall, Richard S. (1971). The Construction of Modern Science. New York: John Wiley and Sons. ISBN 978-0-521-29295-5.
- Wootton, David. The Invention of Science: A New History of the Scientific Revolution (Penguin, 2015). xiv + 769 pp. ISBN 0-06-175952-X.
