= Social gravity =

Social theory

Social gravity is a term relating social structure and socioeconomics to the theory of Newtonian gravity.

== Political and commercial theory ==
The term has been used to describe the system of commercial and political influence. For instance, in The Administration of the Colonies (1764), Thomas Pownall (1722–1805) used the Newtonian concept of "attraction" to form the basis of his political and commercial theory of empire. Pownall's vision provided an important explanation of the mechanism by which colonial theorists understood the possibility of empire being "transferred" from one state to another.

Pownall applied the Newtonian concept of gravity to his theory of empire, as evident in his suggestion that the "laws of nature" held the colonies to Great Britain in a manner "analogous in all cases, by which the center of gravity in the solar system" held the planets in their orbits. In making this analogy, Pownall's notion of 'social gravity' drew upon earlier visions of social cohesion, particularly ideas of sociability in eighteenth-century Britain. These ideas, in turn, were often predicated upon Stoic notions of cosmopolitanism, expressed by the key term oikeiôsis, in order to stress the "moral" imperative for like-minded humans to forge bonds dedicated to the common good.

== Marketing and brand influence ==
Social gravity has been used to describe marketing campaigns focused on forming partnerships and engaging consumers. The term was coined by the Harvard Business Review to describe companies that build brand identity that "pull customers into their orbit". This is done by using company resources to build relationships with a consumer base through authenticity and maintaining social connections.

== Other applications ==
A 2019 publication in The Review of Higher Education related the theory of social gravity to academics. It was noted that peer interactions and social connections positively impact academic performance. As students build their social networks, their overall capacity to learn improves.
