= General Scholium =

Essay by Isaac Newton

The General Scholium (Latin: Scholium Generale) is an essay written by Isaac Newton, appended to his work of Philosophiæ Naturalis Principia Mathematica, known as the Principia. It was first published with the second (1713) edition of the Principia and reappeared with some additions and modifications on the third (1726) edition. It is best known for the "Hypotheses non fingo" ("I frame no hypothesis") expression, which Newton used as a response to some of the criticism received after the release of the first edition (1687). In the essay Newton not only counters the natural philosophy of René Descartes and Gottfried Leibniz, but also addresses issues of scientific methodology, theology, and metaphysics.

== Rejection of Cartesian vortices ==
In the first paragraph, Newton attacks René Descartes's model of the Solar System. Descartes and his supporters were followers of mechanical philosophy, a form of natural philosophy popular in the 17th century which maintained that nature and natural beings act similar to machines. In his book The World, Descartes suggests that the creation of the solar system and the circular motion of the planets around the Sun can be explained with the phenomena of "swirling vortices". Descartes also claimed that the world is made out of tiny "corpuscles" of matter, and that no vacuum could exist.

Descartes's model did not cohere with the ideas introduced in the first edition of the Principia (1687). Newton simply rejected Descartes's "corpuscles and vortices" theory and suggested that gravitational force acts upon celestial bodies regardless of the vast empty interstellar space in between. Newton was publicly criticised by Cartesians on this non-mechanistic theory. As a response to this criticism, Newton argued that Descartes's Vortices cannot explain the unique movement of comets. He sums up the paragraph with the words:

The motions of the Comets are exceedingly regular, are governed by the same laws with the motions of the Planets, and can by no means be accounted for by the hypotheses of Vortices. For Comets are carried with very eccentric motions through all parts of the heavens indifferently, with a freedom that is incompatible with the notion of a Vortex.

== Scientific method argument ==
Newton did not offer any reasons or causes for his law of gravity, and was therefore publicly criticised for introducing "occult agencies" into science. Newton objected to Descartes's and Leibniz's Scientific method of deriving conclusions by applying reason to a priori definitions rather than to empirical evidence, and famously stated "hypotheses non fingo", Latin for "I do not frame hypotheses":

I have not as yet been able to discover the reason for these properties of gravity from phenomena, and I do not frame hypotheses. For whatever is not deduced from the phenomena must be called a hypothesis; and hypotheses, whether metaphysical or physical, or based on occult qualities, or mechanical, have no place in experimental philosophy.

The essay then goes on to present Newton's own approach to scientific methodology. Contrary to the deductive approach of Descartes and Leibniz, Newton holds an inductive approach to scientific inquiry. Phenomena should first be observed, and then general rules should be searched for, and not vice versa. It is this approach, states Newton, that has led to the discovery of "the laws of motion and gravitation":

In this philosophy particular propositions are inferred from the phenomena, and afterwards rendered general by induction. Thus it was that the impenetrability, the mobility, and the impulsive force of bodies, and the laws of motion and of gravitation, were discovered. And to us it is enough, that gravity does really exist, and act according to the laws which we have explained, and abundantly serves to account for all the motions of the celestial bodies, and of our sea.

== Theological views ==
Most of the essay deals with Newton's religious views. However, it is also considered the least understood part of the essay. Newton saw God as an intelligent, powerful, omnipresent Being which governs all. It has been claimed that the text implies that Newton was an anti-Trinitarianist heretic. With no comments explicitly addressing the subject of the Holy Trinity, several parts of the text seem to raise anti-Trinitarianist positions indirectly, most notably:

This most beautiful system of the sun, planets, and comets, could only proceed from the counsel and dominion of an intelligent being. And if the fixed Stars are the centers of other like systems, these, being formed by the like wise counsel, must all be subject to the dominion of One. [...] This Being Governs all things, not as the soul of the world, but as Lord over all: And on account of his dominion he is wont to be called Lord God Παντοκράτωρ, or Universal Ruler.

== "Subtle spirit" ==
The essay ends with a paragraph about a "certain most subtle Spirit, which pervades and lies hid in all gross bodies." It has been largely interpreted as Newton's view and prospect of electricity, a phenomenon of which little was known at the time. Newton describes some attributes of this Spirit and concludes:

But these are things that cannot be explained in a few words, nor are we furnished with that sufficiency of experiments which is required to an accurate determination and demonstration of the laws which this electric spirit operates.
