= Hypotheses non fingo =

Phrase appearing in a 1713 essay by Isaac Newton

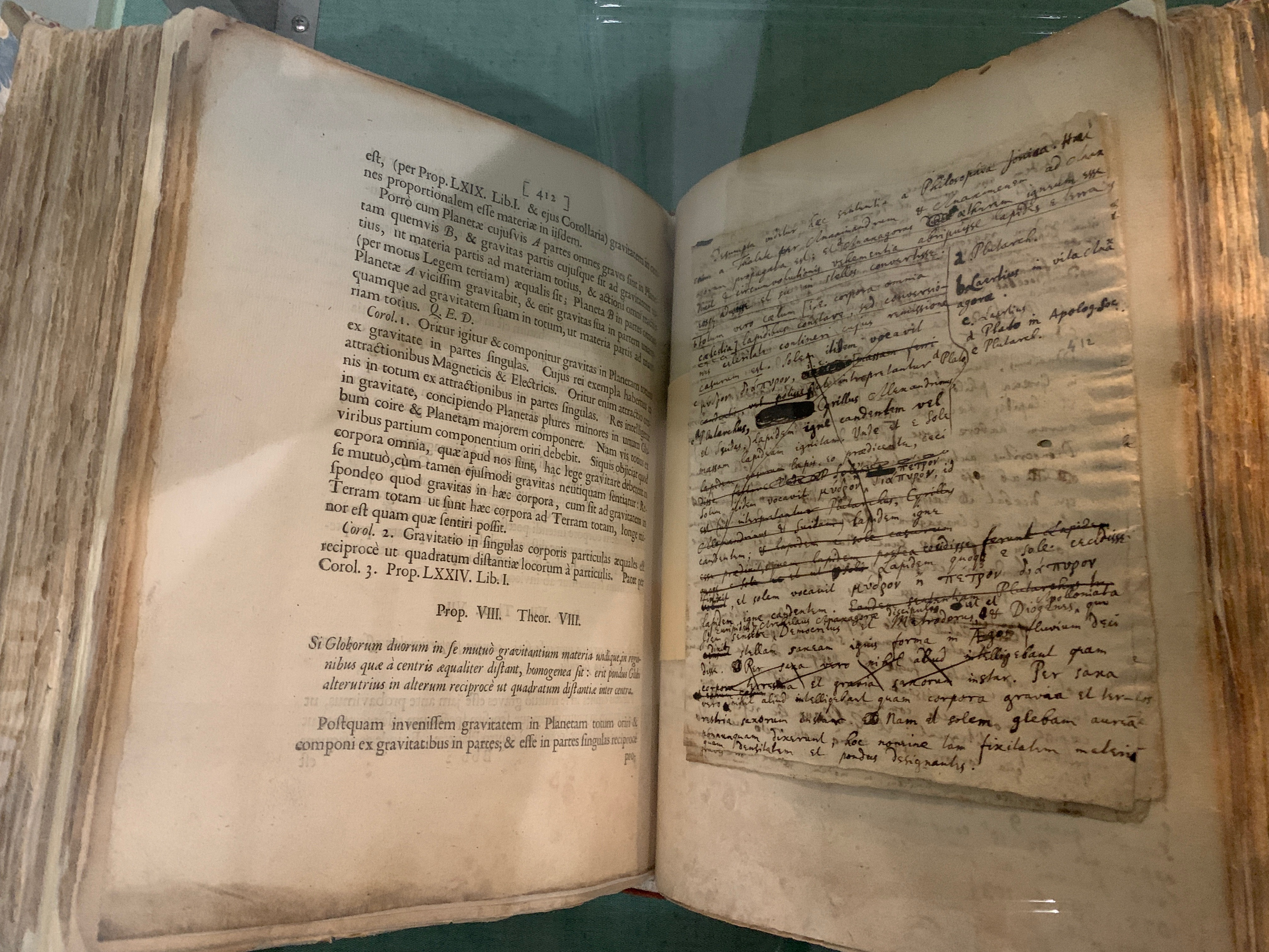
Isaac Newton's first edition of Philosophiæ Naturalis Principia Mathematica annotated by him for the second edition

In the history of physics, hypotheses non fingo (Latin for "I frame no hypotheses", or "I contrive no hypotheses") is a phrase used by Isaac Newton in the essay General Scholium, which was appended to the second edition of Philosophiae Naturalis Principia Mathematica in 1713.

== Original remark ==
A 1999 translation of the Principia presents Newton's remark as follows:

I have not as yet been able to discover the reason for these properties of gravity from phenomena, and I do not feign hypotheses. For whatever is not deduced from the phenomena must be called a hypothesis; and hypotheses, whether metaphysical or physical, or based on occult qualities, or mechanical, have no place in experimental philosophy. In this philosophy particular propositions are inferred from the phenomena, and afterwards rendered general by induction.

=== Latin text ===
The original Latin text reads:

Rationem vero harum gravitatis proprietatum ex phænomenis nondum potui deducere, & hypotheses non fingo. Quicquid enim ex phænomenis non deducitur, hypothesis vocanda est; & hypotheses seu metaphysicæ, seu physicæ, seu qualitatum occultarum, seu mechanicæ, in philosophia experimentali locum non habent. In hac philosophia propositiones deducuntur ex phænomenis, & redduntur generales per inductionem.

== Later commentary ==
The 19th-century philosopher of science William Whewell qualified this statement, saying that, "it was by such a use of hypotheses, that both Newton himself and Kepler, on whose discoveries those of Newton were based, made their discoveries". Whewell stated:

What is requisite is, that the hypothesis should be close to the facts, and not connected with them by other arbitrary and untried facts; and that the philosopher should be ready to resign it as soon as the facts refuse to confirm it.

Later, Imre Lakatos asserted that such a resignation should not be too rushed.

== See also ==
- Action at a distance
- Primum movens
