= Isaac Newton =

English polymath (1642–1727)

Sir Isaac Newton FRS
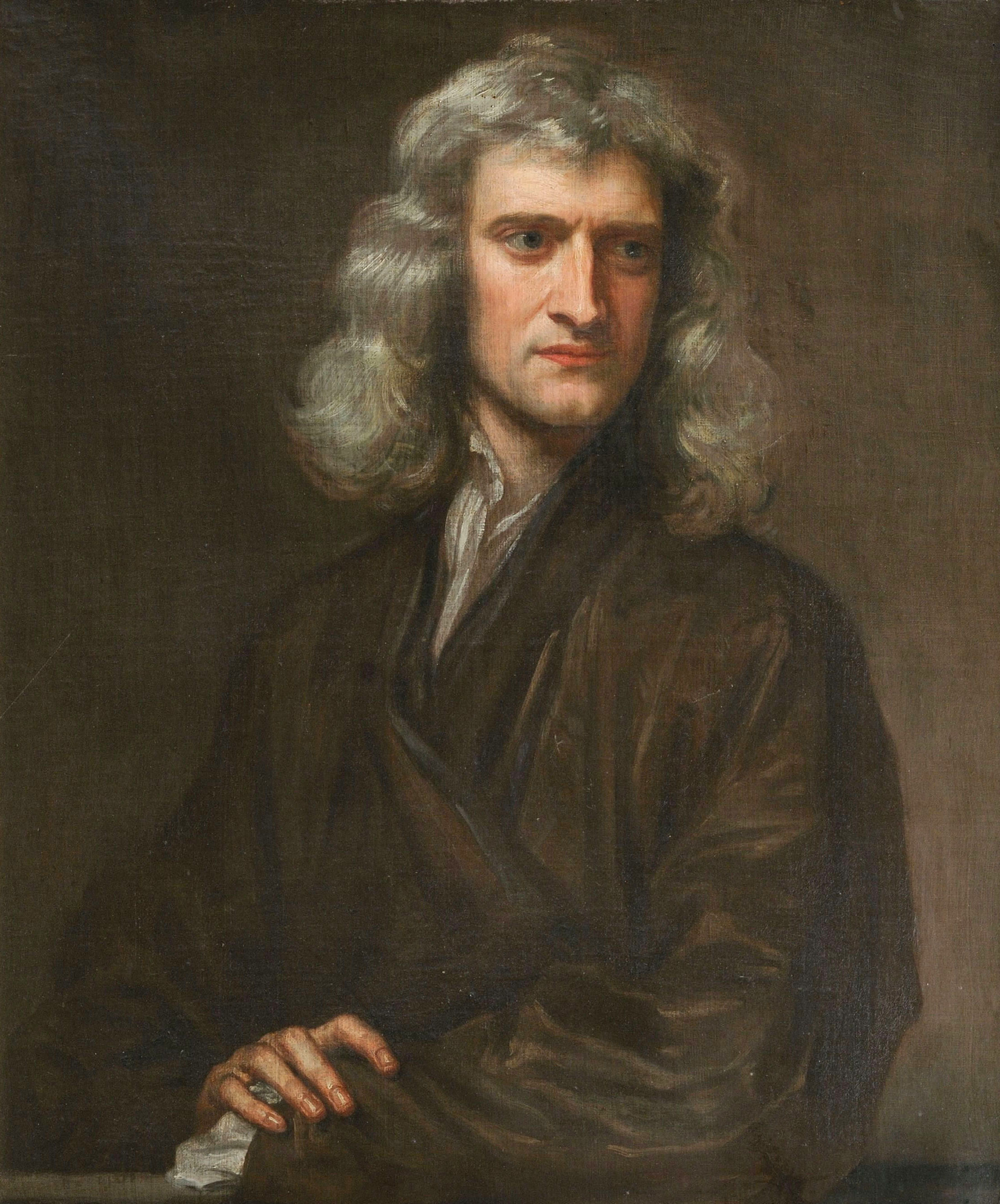
- Portrait of Isaac Newton, 1689
- Born: 4 January 1643 [O.S. 25 December 1642] (Note: During Newton's lifetime, two calendars were in use in Europe: the Julian ("Old Style" calendar in Protestant and Orthodox regions, including Britain; and the Gregorian ("New Style") calendar in Roman Catholic Europe. At Newton's birth, Gregorian dates were ten days ahead of Julian dates; thus, his birth is recorded as taking place on 25 December 1642 Old Style, but it can be converted to a New Style (modern) date of 4 January 1643. By the time of his death, the difference between the calendars had increased to eleven days. Moreover the civil or legal year in England began on 25 March, therefore the Newton's death on 20 March was still dated as 1726 O.S. there.); Woolsthorpe-by-Colsterworth, Lincolnshire, England
- Died: 31 March 1727 (aged 84) [O.S. 20 March 1726] Kensington, Middlesex, England
- Burial place: Westminster Abbey
- Education: Trinity College, Cambridge (BA, 1665; MA, 1668)
- Known for: Newtonian mechanics universal gravitation calculus More: Newton's laws of motion; optics; binomial series; Principia; Newton's method; Newton's law of cooling; Newton's identities; Newton's metal; Newton line; Newton–Gauss line; Newtonian fluid; Newton's rings; Standing on the shoulders of giants; List of all other works and concepts
- Political party: Whig
- Awards: FRS (1672); Knight Bachelor (1705)
- Scientific career
- Fields: Physics; natural philosophy; alchemy; theology; mathematics; astronomy; economics
- Workplaces: University of Cambridge; Royal Society; Royal Mint
- Academic advisors: Isaac Barrow; Benjamin Pulleyn

Member of Parliament for the University of Cambridge
- In office 1689–1690 Serving with Henry Boyle
- Preceded by: Robert Brady
- Succeeded by: Edward Finch
- In office 1701–1702 Serving with Henry Boyle
- Preceded by: Anthony Hammond
- Succeeded by: Arthur Annesley, 5th Earl of Anglesey

12th President of the Royal Society
- In office 1703–1727
- Preceded by: John Somers
- Succeeded by: Hans Sloane

Master of the Mint
- In office 1699–1727
- 1696–1699: Warden of the Mint
- Preceded by: Thomas Neale
- Succeeded by: John Conduitt

2nd Lucasian Professor of Mathematics
- In office 1669–1702
- Preceded by: Isaac Barrow
- Succeeded by: William Whiston

Sir Isaac Newton (/ˈnjuːtən/; 4 January 1643 [O.S. 25 December 1642] – 31 March 1727 [O.S. 20 March 1726]) was an English polymath who was a mathematician, physicist, astronomer, alchemist, theologian, historian and inventor. He was a key figure in the Scientific Revolution and the Enlightenment that followed. His book Philosophiæ Naturalis Principia Mathematica (Mathematical Principles of Natural Philosophy), first published in 1687, achieved the first great unification in physics and established classical mechanics. Newton also made seminal contributions to optics, and shares credit with the German mathematician Gottfried Wilhelm Leibniz for formulating infinitesimal calculus, although he developed calculus years before Leibniz. Newton contributed to and refined the scientific method, and his work is considered the most influential in bringing forth modern science.

In the Principia, Newton formulated the laws of motion and universal gravitation that formed the dominant scientific viewpoint for centuries until it was superseded by the theory of relativity. While this is the case, his laws still serve as sufficient approximations for all physical phenomena involving low speeds (much less than the speed of light) and weak gravitational fields. He used his mathematical description of gravity to derive Kepler's laws of planetary motion, account for tides, the trajectories of comets, the precession of the equinoxes and other phenomena, eradicating doubt about the Solar System's heliocentricity. Newton solved the two-body problem and introduced the three-body problem. He demonstrated that the motion of objects on Earth and celestial bodies could be accounted for by the same principles. Newton's inference that the Earth is an oblate spheroid was subsequently confirmed by the geodetic measurements of Pierre Louis Maupertuis, Alexis Clairaut, Charles Marie de La Condamine, and others, convincing most European scientists of the superiority of Newtonian mechanics over earlier systems. He was also the first to calculate the age of Earth by experiment, and described a precursor to the modern wind tunnel. Further, he was the first to provide a quantitative estimate of the solar mass.

Newton built the first reflecting telescope and developed a sophisticated theory of colour based on the observation that a prism separates white light into the colours of the visible spectrum. His work on light was collected in his book Opticks, published in 1704. He originated prisms as beam expanders and multiple-prism arrays, which would later become integral to the development of tunable lasers. Newton also formulated an empirical law of cooling, which was the first heat transfer formulation and serves as the formal basis of convective heat transfer, made the first theoretical calculation of the speed of sound, and introduced the notions of a Newtonian fluid and a black body. He was also the first to explain the Magnus effect. Moreover, he was the first to analyse Couette flow. In addition to his creation of calculus, Newton's work on mathematics was extensive. He generalised the binomial theorem to any real number, introduced the Puiseux series, was the first to state Bézout's theorem, classified most of the cubic plane curves, contributed to the study of Cremona transformations, developed a method for approximating the roots of a function, originated the Newton–Cotes formulas used for numerical integration, and further produced the earliest explicit enunciation of the general Taylor series. Additionally, Newton initiated the field of calculus of variations, formulated and solved the earliest problem in geometric probability, devised the earliest form of linear regression, and was a pioneer of vector analysis.

Newton was a fellow of Trinity College and the second Lucasian Professor of Mathematics at the University of Cambridge; he was appointed at the age of 26. He was a devout but heterodox Christian who privately rejected the doctrine of the Trinity. He refused to take holy orders in the Church of England, unlike most members of the Cambridge faculty of the day. Beyond his work on the mathematical sciences, Newton dedicated much of his time to the study of alchemy and biblical chronology, but most of his work in those areas remained unpublished until long after his death. Politically and personally tied to the Whigs, Newton served two brief terms as Member of Parliament for the University of Cambridge, in 1689–1690 and 1701–1702. He was knighted by Queen Anne in 1705 and spent the last three decades of his life in London, serving as Warden (1696–1699) and Master (1699–1727) of the Royal Mint, in which he increased the accuracy and security of British coinage. He was also the president of the Royal Society (1703–1727). He died at the age of 84 and was the first scientist to be buried at Westminster Abbey.

== Early life ==
Isaac Newton was born (according to the Julian calendar in use in England at the time) on Christmas Day, 25 December 1642 (NS 4 January 1643) at Woolsthorpe Manor in Woolsthorpe-by-Colsterworth, a hamlet in Lincolnshire. His father, also named Isaac Newton, had died three months before. Born prematurely, Newton was a small child; his mother, Hannah Ayscough, said that he could have fit inside a quart mug. When Newton was three, his mother remarried and went to live with her new husband, the Reverend Barnabas Smith, leaving her son in the care of his maternal grandmother, Margery Ayscough (née Blythe). Newton disliked his stepfather and maintained some enmity towards his mother for marrying him, as revealed by this entry in a list of sins committed up to the age of 19: "Threatening my father and mother Smith to burn them and the house over them." Newton's mother had three children (Mary, Benjamin, and Hannah) from her second marriage.

=== The King's School ===
From the age of about twelve until he was seventeen, Newton was educated at The King's School in Grantham, which taught Latin and Ancient Greek and probably imparted a significant foundation of mathematics. He was removed from school by his mother and returned to Woolsthorpe by October 1659. His mother, widowed for the second time, attempted to make him a farmer, an occupation he hated. Henry Stokes, master at The King's School, and Reverend William Ayscough (Newton's uncle) persuaded his mother to send him back to school. Motivated by a desire for revenge against a schoolyard bully, whom Newton beat in a fight and humiliated, he became the top-ranked student, distinguishing himself mainly by building sundials and models of windmills.

=== University of Cambridge ===
In June 1661, Newton was admitted to Trinity College at the University of Cambridge. His uncle the Reverend William Ayscough, who had studied at Cambridge, recommended him to the university. At Cambridge, Newton started as a subsizar, paying his way by performing valet duties until he was awarded a scholarship in 1664, which covered his university costs for four more years until the completion of his MA. At the time, Cambridge's teachings were based on those of Aristotle, whom Newton read along with then more modern philosophers, including René Descartes and astronomers such as Galileo Galilei and Thomas Street. He set down in his notebook a series of "Quaestiones" about mechanical philosophy as he found it. In 1665, he discovered the generalised binomial theorem and began to develop a mathematical theory that later became calculus. Soon after Newton obtained his BA degree at Cambridge in August 1665, the university temporarily closed as a precaution against the Great Plague.

Although he had been undistinguished as a Cambridge student, his private studies and the years following his bachelor's degree have been described as "the richest and most productive ever experienced by a scientist". The next two years alone saw the development of theories on calculus, optics, and the law of gravitation, at his home in Woolsthorpe. The physicist Louis Trenchard More writes that "There are no other examples of achievement in the history of science to compare with that of Newton during those two golden years."

Newton has been described as an "exceptionally organized" person when it came to note-taking, further dog-earing pages he saw as important. Ilan Mochari wrote in 2015 that Newton's "indexes look like present-day indexes: They are alphabetical, by topic." His books showed his interests to be wide-ranging, with Newton himself described as a "Janusian thinker, someone who could mix and combine seemingly disparate fields to stimulate creative breakthroughs." William Stukeley wrote that Newton "was not only very expert with his mechanical tools, but he was equally so with his pen", and further illustrated how Newton's lodging room wall at Grantham was covered in drawings of "birds, beasts, men, ships & mathematical schemes. & very well designed". He also noted his "uncommon skill & industry in mechanical works".

In April 1667, Newton returned to the University of Cambridge, and in October he was elected as a fellow of Trinity. Fellows were required to take holy orders and be ordained as Anglican priests, although this was not enforced in the Restoration years, and an assertion of conformity to the Church of England was sufficient. He made the commitment that "I will either set Theology as the object of my studies and will take holy orders when the time prescribed by these statutes [7 years] arrives, or I will resign from the college." Up until this point he had not thought much about religion and had twice signed his agreement to the Thirty-nine Articles, the basis of Church of England doctrine. By 1675 the issue could not be avoided, and his unconventional views stood in the way.

His academic work impressed the Lucasian Professor Isaac Barrow, who was anxious to develop his own religious and administrative potential (he became master of Trinity College two years later); in 1669, Newton succeeded him, only one year after receiving his MA. Newton argued that this should exempt him from the ordination requirement, and King Charles II, whose permission was needed, accepted this argument; thus, a conflict between Newton's religious views and Anglican orthodoxy was averted. He was appointed at the age of 26.

As accomplished as Newton was as a theoretician, he was less effective as a teacher; his classes were almost always empty. Humphrey Newton, his sizar (assistant), noted that Newton would arrive on time and, if the room was empty, he would reduce his lecture time in half from 30 to 15 minutes, talk to the walls, then retreat to his experiments, thus fulfilling his contractual obligations. For his part Newton enjoyed neither teaching nor students. Over his career he was only assigned three students to tutor.

Newton was elected a Fellow of the Royal Society (FRS) in 1672.

=== Revision of Geographia Generalis ===
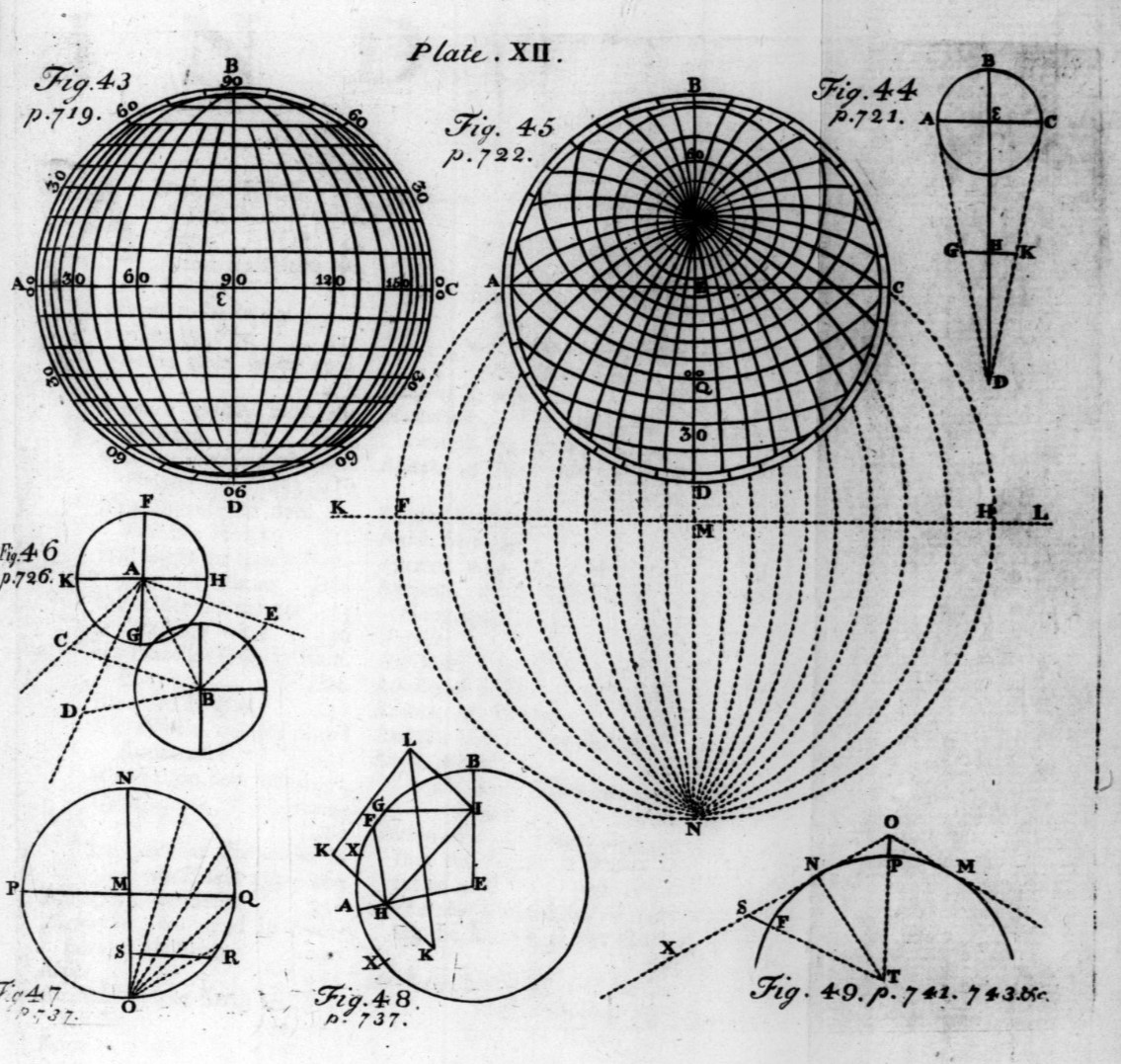
Some of the figures added by Isaac Newton in his 1672 and 1681 editions of the Geographia Generalis. These figures appeared in subsequent editions as well.

The Lucasian Professor of Mathematics at Cambridge position included the responsibility of instructing geography. In 1672, and again in 1681, Newton published a revised, corrected, and amended edition of the Geographia Generalis, a geography textbook first published in 1650 by the then-deceased Bernhardus Varenius. In the Geographia Generalis, Varenius attempted to create a theoretical foundation linking scientific principles to classical concepts in geography, and considered geography to be a mix between science and pure mathematics applied to quantifying features of the Earth. While it is unclear if Newton ever lectured in geography, the 1733 Dugdale and Shaw English translation of the book stated Newton published the book to be read by students while he lectured on the subject. The Geographia Generalis is viewed by some as the dividing line between ancient and more modern traditions in the history of geography, and Newton's involvement in the subsequent editions is thought to be a large part of the reason for this enduring legacy.

== Scientific studies ==
=== Mathematics ===
Newton's work has been said "to distinctly advance every branch of mathematics then studied". His work on calculus, usually referred to as fluxions, began in 1664, and by 20 May 1665 as seen in a manuscript, Newton "had already developed the calculus to the point where he could compute the tangent and the curvature at any point of a continuous curve". His work by 1665 amounted to a systematic calculus that unified differentiation and integration, which he applied to the dynamic analysis of algebraic and transcendental curves, an approach described by scholar Tom Whiteside as "radically novel, indeed unprecedented" and which later directly informed the theory of central-force orbits in the Principia. Another manuscript of October 1666, is now published among Newton's mathematical papers. Newton recorded a definitive tract of calculus in what is called his "Waste Book". He was self-taught in mathematics and did his research without help, as according to scholar Richard S. Westfall, "By every indication we have, Newton carried out his education in mathematics and his program of research entirely on his own." His work De analysi per aequationes numero terminorum infinitas, sent by Isaac Barrow to John Collins in June 1669, was identified by Barrow in a letter sent to Collins that August as the work "of an extraordinary genius and proficiency in these things".

Newton later became involved in a dispute with the German polymath Gottfried Wilhelm Leibniz over priority in the development of calculus. Both are now credited with independently developing calculus, though with very different mathematical notations. However, it is established that Newton came to develop calculus much earlier than Leibniz. Despite this, the notation of Leibniz is recognised as the more convenient notation, being adopted by continental European mathematicians, and after 1820, by British mathematicians.

The historian of science A. Rupert Hall notes that while Leibniz deserves credit for his independent formulation of calculus, Newton was undoubtedly the first to develop it, stating:

But all these matters are of little weight in comparison with the central truth, which has indeed long been universally recognized, that Newton was master of the essential techniques of the calculus by the end of 1666, almost exactly nine years before Leibniz . . . Newton's claim to have mastered the new infinitesimal calculus long before Leibniz, and even to have written — or at least made a good start upon — a publishable exposition of it as early as 1671, is certainly borne out by copious evidence, and though Leibniz and some of his friends sought to belittle Newton's case, the truth has not been seriously in doubt for the last 250 years.

Hall further notes that in Principia, Newton was able to "formulate and resolve problems by the integration of differential equations" and "in fact, he anticipated in his book many results that later exponents of the calculus regarded as their own novel achievements." Hall notes Newton's rapid development of calculus in comparison to his contemporaries, stating that Newton "well before 1690 . . . had reached roughly the point in the development of the calculus that Leibniz, the two Bernoullis, L'Hospital, Hermann and others had by joint efforts reached in print by the early 1700s".

Despite the convenience of Leibniz's notation, it has been noted that Newton's notation could also have developed multivariate techniques, with his dot notation still widely used in physics. Some academics have noted the richness and depth of Newton's work, such as the physicist Roger Penrose, stating "in most cases Newton's geometrical methods are not only more concise and elegant, they reveal deeper principles than would become evident by the use of those formal methods of calculus that nowadays would seem more direct." The mathematician Vladimir Arnold stated that "Comparing the texts of Newton with the comments of his successors, it is striking how Newton's original presentation is more modern, more understandable and richer in ideas than the translation due to commentators of his geometrical ideas into the formal language of the calculus of Leibniz."

His work extensively uses calculus in geometric form based on limiting values of the ratios of vanishingly small quantities: in the Principia itself, Newton gave demonstration of this under the name of "the method of first and last ratios" and explained why he put his expositions in this form, remarking also that "hereby the same thing is performed as by the method of indivisibles." Because of this, the Principia has been called "a book dense with the theory and application of the infinitesimal calculus" in the 20th century and in Newton's time "nearly all of it is of this calculus." His use of methods involving "one or more orders of the infinitesimally small" is present in his De motu corporum in gyrum of 1684 and in his papers on motion "during the two decades preceding 1684".

It has been argued that Newton had an imprecise or limited understanding of limits. However, the mathematician Bruce Pourciau contends that in his Principia, Newton actually demonstrated a more sophisticated understanding of limits than he is generally credited with, including being the first to present an epsilon argument.

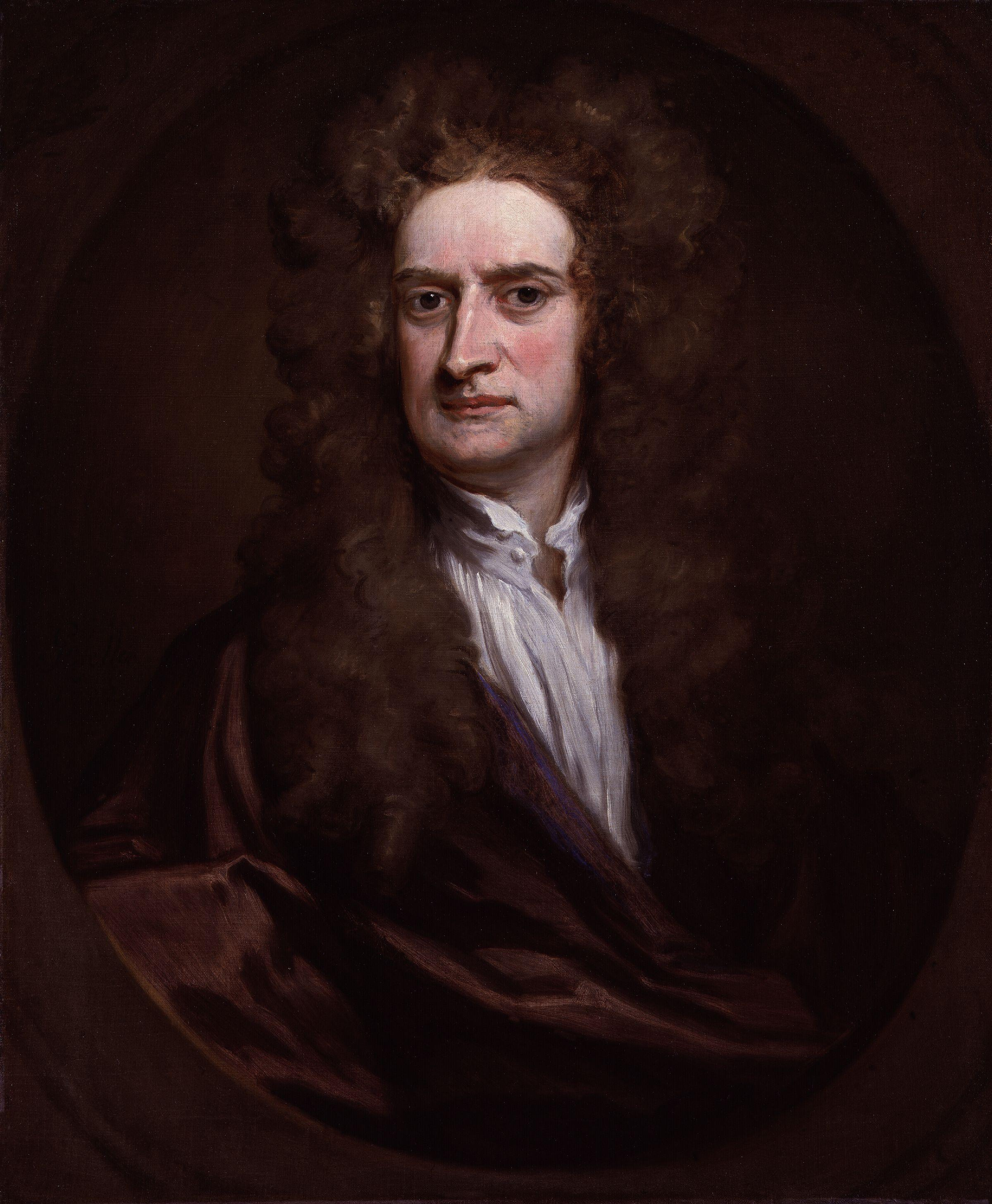
Newton in 1702 by Godfrey Kneller

Newton had been reluctant to publish his calculus because he feared controversy and criticism. He was close to the Swiss mathematician Nicolas Fatio de Duillier. In 1691, Duillier started to write a new version of Newton's Principia, and corresponded with Leibniz. In 1693, the relationship between Duillier and Newton deteriorated and the book was never completed. Starting in 1699, Duillier accused Leibniz of plagiarism. The mathematician John Keill accused Leibniz of plagiarism in 1708 in the Royal Society journal, thereby deteriorating the situation even more. The dispute then broke out in full force in 1711 when the Royal Society proclaimed in a study that it was Newton who was the true discoverer and labelled Leibniz a fraud; it was later found that Newton wrote the study's concluding remarks on Leibniz. Thus began the bitter controversy which marred the lives of both men until Leibniz's death in 1716.

Newton's first major mathematical discovery was the generalised binomial theorem, valid for any exponent, in 1664–65, which has been called "one of the most powerful and significant in the whole of mathematics." He discovered Newton's identities (probably without knowing of earlier work by Albert Girard in 1629), Newton's method, the Newton polygon, and classified cubic plane curves (polynomials of degree three in two variables). Newton is also a founder of the theory of Cremona transformations, and he made substantial contributions to the theory of finite differences, with Newton regarded as "the single most significant contributor to finite difference interpolation", with many formulas created by Newton. He was the first to state Bézout's theorem, and was also the first to use fractional indices and to employ coordinate geometry to derive solutions to Diophantine equations. He approximated partial sums of the harmonic series by logarithms (a precursor to Euler's summation formula) and was the first to use power series with confidence and to revert power series. He introduced the Puiseux series. He also provided the earliest explicit formulation of the general Taylor series, which appeared in a 1691-1692 draft of his De Quadratura Curvarum. He originated the Newton-Cotes formulas for numerical integration. Newton's work on infinite series was inspired by Simon Stevin's decimals. He also initiated the field of calculus of variations, being the first to formulate and solve a problem in the field, that being Newton's minimal resistance problem, which he posed and solved in 1685, later publishing it in Principia in 1687. It is regarded as one of the most difficult problems tackled by variational methods prior to the twentieth century. He then used calculus of variations in his solving of the brachistochrone curve problem in 1697, which was posed by Johann Bernoulli in 1696, and which he famously solved in a night, thus pioneering the field with his work on the two problems. He was also a pioneer of vector analysis, as he demonstrated how to apply the parallelogram law for adding various physical quantities and realised that these quantities could be broken down into components in any direction. He is credited with introducing the notion of the vector in his Principia, by proposing that physical quantities like velocity, acceleration, momentum, and force be treated as directed quantities, thereby making Newton the "true originator of this mathematical object".

Newton was probably first to develop a system of polar coordinates in a strictly analytic sense, with his work in relation to the topic being superior, in both generality and flexibility, to any other during his lifetime. His 1671 Method of Fluxions work preceded the earliest publication on the subject by Jacob Bernoulli in 1691. He is also credited as the originator of bipolar coordinates in a strict sense.

A private manuscript of Newton's which dates to 1664–66 contains what is the earliest known problem in the field of geometric probability. The problem dealt with the likelihood of a negligible ball landing in one of two unequal sectors of a circle. In analysing this problem, he proposed substituting the enumeration of occurrences with their quantitative assessment, and replacing the estimation of an area's proportion with a tally of points, which has led to him being credited as founding stereology.

Newton was responsible for the origin of Gaussian elimination in Europe. In 1669 to 1670, Newton wrote that all the algebra books known to him lacked a lesson for solving simultaneous equations, which he then supplied. His notes lay unpublished for decades, but once released, his textbook became the most influential of its kind, establishing the method of substitution and the key terminology of 'extermination' (now known as elimination).

In the 1660s and 1670s, Newton found 72 of the 78 "species" of cubic curves and categorised them into four types, systemising his results in later publications. However, a 1690s manuscript later analysed showed that Newton had identified all 78 cubic curves, but chose not to publish the remaining six for unknown reasons. In 1717, and probably with Newton's help, James Stirling proved that every cubic was one of these four types. He claimed that the four types could be obtained by plane projection from one of them, and this was proved in 1731, four years after his death.

In 1693, Samuel Pepys asked Newton for advice on a problem in probability, which later became known as the Newton–Pepys problem. The problem concerns which of three scenarios has the highest probability: six dice thrown and at least one six appears, twelve dice thrown and two or more sixes appear, or eighteen dice thrown resulting in three or more sixes. Pepys had placed his bet on the eighteen dice scenario, but Newton presented three different arguments that the most likely scenario was the first one, with six dice. One of his arguments was a bit tricky and had a flaw.

=== Optics ===
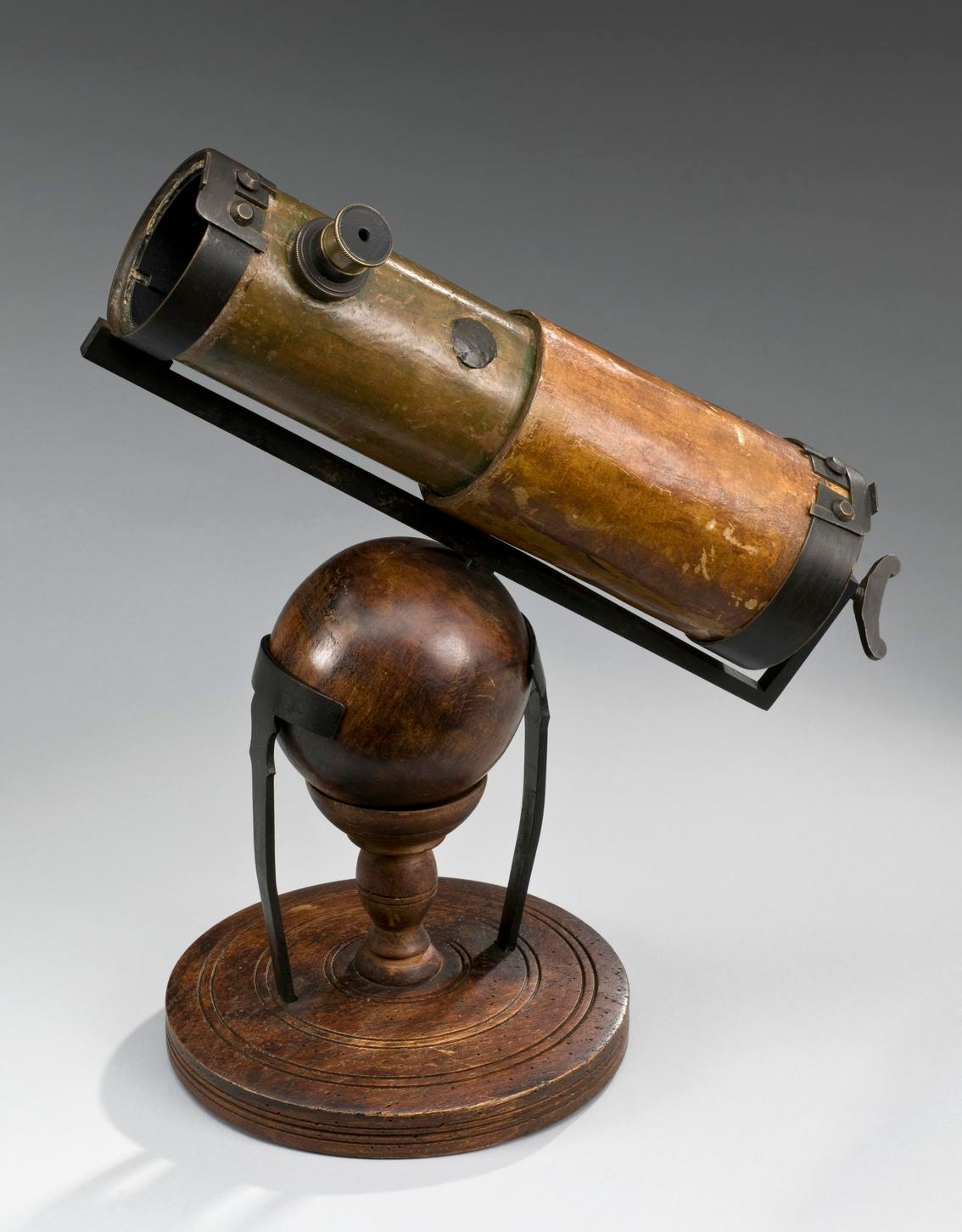
A replica of the reflecting telescope Newton presented to the Royal Society in 1672 (the first one he made in 1668 was loaned to an instrument maker but there is no further record of what happened to it).

In 1666, Newton observed that the spectrum of colours exiting a prism in the position of minimum deviation is oblong, even when the light ray entering the prism is circular, which is to say, the prism refracts different colours by different angles. This led him to conclude that colour is a property intrinsic to light – a point which had, until then, been a matter of debate.

From 1670 to 1672, Newton lectured on optics. During this period he investigated the refraction of light, demonstrating that the multicoloured image produced by a prism, which he named a spectrum, could be recomposed into white light by a lens and a second prism. 21st century scholarship has revealed that Newton's analysis and resynthesis of white light owes a debt to corpuscular alchemy.

In his work on Newton's rings in 1671, he used a method that was unprecedented in the 17th century, as "he averaged all of the differences, and he then calculated the difference between the average and the value for the first ring", in effect introducing a now standard method for reducing noise in measurements, and which does not appear elsewhere at the time. He extended his "error-slaying method" to studies of equinoxes in 1700, which was described as an "altogether unprecedented method" but differed in that here "Newton required good values for each of the original equinoctial times, and so he devised a method that allowed them to, as it were, self-correct." Newton "invented a certain technique known today as linear regression analysis", as he wrote the first of the two 'normal equations' known from ordinary least squares, averaged a set of data, 50 years before Tobias Mayer, the person originally thought to be the oldest to do so, and he also summed the residuals to zero, forcing the regression line through the average point. He differentiated between two uneven sets of data and may have considered an optimal solution regarding bias, although not in terms of effectiveness.

He showed that coloured light does not change its properties by separating out a coloured beam and shining it on various objects, and that regardless of whether reflected, scattered, or transmitted, the light remains the same colour. Thus, he observed that colour is the result of objects interacting with already-coloured light rather than objects generating the colour themselves. This is known as Newton's theory of colour. His 1672 paper on the nature of white light and colours forms the basis for all work that followed on colour and colour vision.

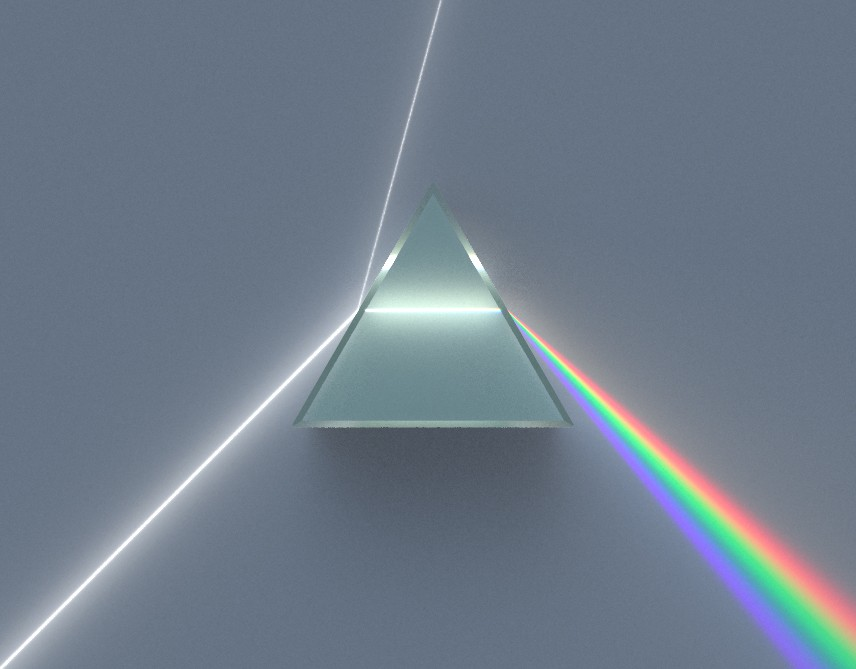
Illustration of a dispersive prism separating white light into the colours of the spectrum, as discovered by Newton

From this work, he concluded that the lens of any refracting telescope would suffer from the dispersion of light into colours (chromatic aberration). As a proof of the concept, he constructed a telescope using reflective mirrors instead of lenses as the objective to bypass that problem. Building the design, the first known functional reflecting telescope, today known as a Newtonian telescope, involved solving the problem of a suitable mirror material and shaping technique. Previous designs for the reflecting telescope were never put into practice or ended in failure, thereby making Newton's telescope the first one truly created. Newton ground his own mirrors out of a custom composition of highly reflective speculum metal, using Newton's rings to judge the quality of the optics for his telescopes. In late 1668, he was able to produce this first reflecting telescope. It was about eight inches long and it gave a clearer and larger image. Newton reported that he could see the four Galilean moons of Jupiter and the crescent phase of Venus with his new reflecting telescope. In 1671, he was asked for a demonstration of his reflecting telescope by the Royal Society. Their interest encouraged him to publish his notes, Of Colours, which he later expanded into the work Opticks. When Robert Hooke criticised some of Newton's ideas, Newton was so offended that he withdrew from public debate. However, the two had brief exchanges in 1679–80, when Hooke, who had been appointed Secretary of the Royal Society, opened a correspondence intended to elicit contributions from Newton to Royal Society transactions, which had the effect of stimulating Newton to work out a proof that the elliptical form of planetary orbits would result from a centripetal force inversely proportional to the square of the radius vector.

In astronomy, Newton is further credited with the realisation that high-altitude sites are superior for observation because they provide the "most serene and quiet Air" above the dense, turbulent atmosphere ("grosser Clouds"), thereby reducing star twinkling.

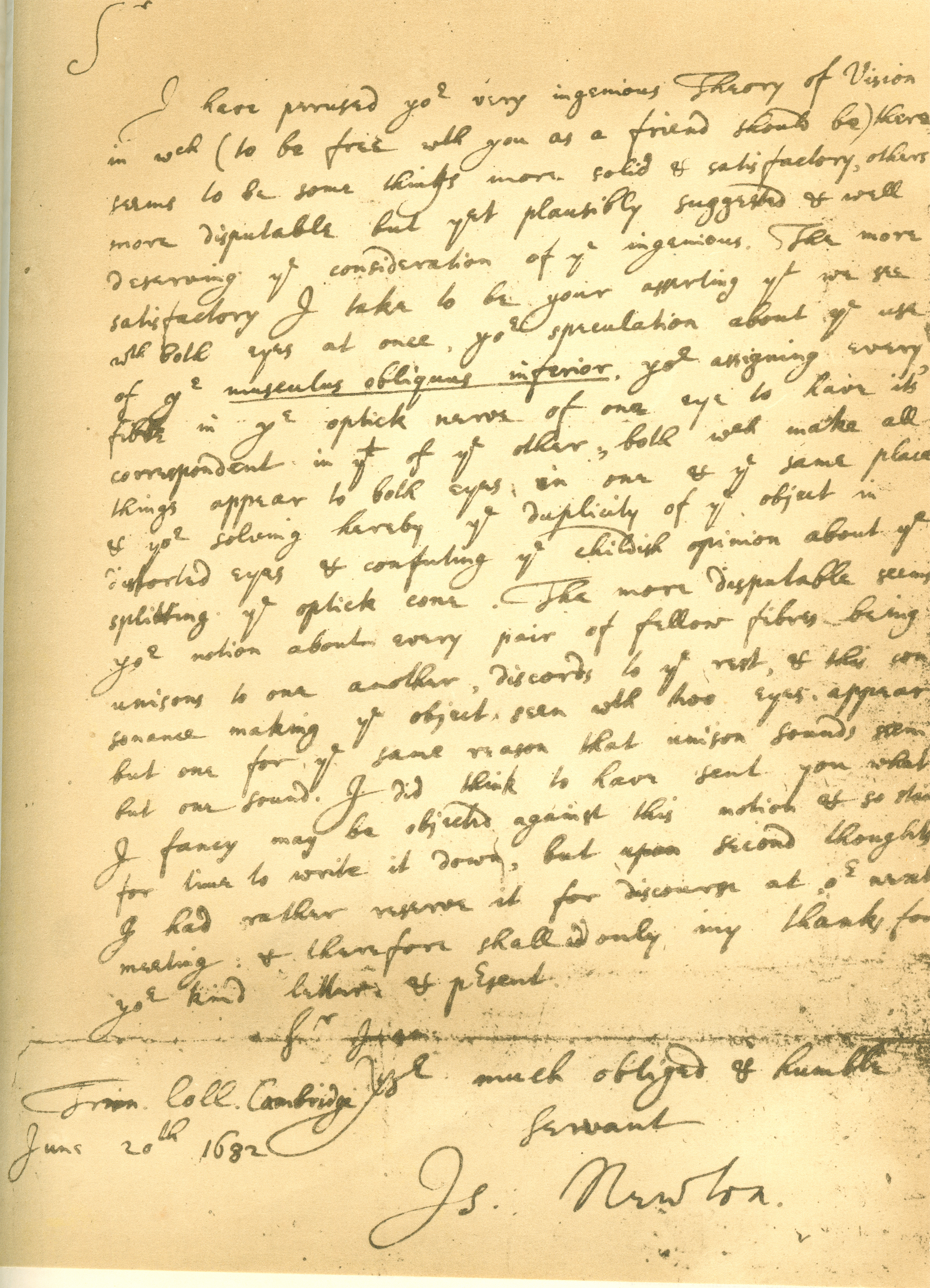
Facsimile of a 1682 letter from Newton to William Briggs, commenting on Briggs' A New Theory of Vision

Newton argued that light is composed of particles or corpuscles, which were refracted by accelerating into a denser medium. He verged on soundlike waves to explain the repeated pattern of reflection and transmission by thin films (Opticks Bk. II, Props. 12), but still retained his theory of 'fits' that disposed corpuscles to be reflected or transmitted (Props.13). Despite his known preference of a particle theory, Newton noted that light had both particle-like and wave-like properties in Opticks; he believed that corpuscles must interact with waves in a medium to explain interference patterns and the general phenomenon of diffraction.

In his Hypothesis of Light of 1675, Newton posited the existence of the ether to transmit forces between particles. The contact with the Cambridge Platonist philosopher Henry More revived his interest in alchemy. He replaced the ether with occult forces based on Hermetic ideas of attraction and repulsion between particles. His contributions to science cannot be isolated from his interest in alchemy. This was at a time when there was no clear distinction between alchemy and science.

Newton contributed to the study of astigmatism by helping to erect its mathematical foundation through his discovery that when oblique pencils of light undergo refraction, two distinct image points are created. This would later stimulate the work of Thomas Young.

In 1704, Newton published Opticks, in which he expounded his corpuscular theory of light, and included a set of queries at the end, which were posed as unanswered questions and positive assertions. In line with his corpuscle theory, he thought that normal matter was made of grosser corpuscles and speculated that through a kind of alchemical transmutation, with query 30 stating "Are not gross Bodies and Light convertible into one another, and may not Bodies receive much of their Activity from the Particles of Light which enter their Composition?" Query 6 introduced the concept of a black body. Opticks has been referred to as one of the "earliest exemplars of experimental procedure".

In 1699, Newton presented an improved version of his reflecting quadrant, or octant, that he had previously designed to the Royal Society. His design was probably built as early as 1677. It is notable for being the first quadrant to use two mirrors, which greatly improved the accuracy of measurements since it provided a stable view of both the horizon and the celestial body at the same time. His quadrant was built but appears to have not survived to the present. John Hadley would later construct his own double-reflecting quadrant that was nearly identical to the one invented by Newton. However, Hadley likely did not know of Newton's original invention, causing confusion regarding originality.

In 1704, Newton constructed and presented a burning mirror to the Royal Society. It consisted of seven concave glass mirrors, each about one foot in diameter. It is estimated that it reached a maximum possible radiant energy of 460 W cm⁻², which has been described as "certainly brighter thermally than a thousand Suns (1,000 × 0.065 W cm⁻²)" based on estimating that the intensity of the Sun's radiation in London in May 1704 was 0.065 W cm⁻². As a result of the maximum radiant intensity possibly achieved with his mirror he "may have produced the greatest intensity of radiation brought about by human agency before the arrival of nuclear weapons in 1945." David Gregory reported that it caused metals to smoke, boiled gold and brought about the vitrification of slate. William Derham thought it be to the most powerful burning mirror in Europe at the time.

Newton also made early studies into electricity, as he constructed a primitive form of a frictional electrostatic generator using a glass globe, the first to do so with glass instead of sulfur, which had previously been used by scientists such as Otto von Guericke to construct their globes. He detailed an experiment in 1675 that showed when one side of a glass sheet is rubbed to create an electric charge, it attracts "light bodies" to the opposite side. He interpreted this as evidence that electric forces could pass through glass. Newton also reported to the Royal Society that glass was effective for generating static electricity, classifying it as a "good electric" decades before this property was widely known. His idea in Opticks that optical reflection and refraction arise from interactions across the entire surface is seen as a precursor to the field theory of the electric force. He also recognised the crucial role of electricity in nature, believing it to be responsible for various phenomena, including the emission, reflection, refraction, inflection, and heating effects of light. He proposed that electricity was involved in the sensations experienced by the human body, affecting everything from muscle movement to brain function. His theory of nervous transmission had an immense influence on the work of Luigi Galvani, as Newton's theory focused on electricity as a possible mediator of nervous transmission, which went against the prevailing Cartesian hydraulic theory of the time. He was also the first to present a clear and balanced theory for how both electrical and chemical mechanisms could work together in the nervous system. Newton's mass-dispersion model, ancestral to the successful use of the least action principle, provided a credible framework for understanding refraction, particularly in its approach to refraction in terms of momentum.

In Opticks, Newton introduced prisms as beam expanders and multiple-prism arrays, prismatic configurations that nearly 278 years later were incorporated into tunable lasers, where multiple-prism beam expanders became central to the development of narrow-linewidth systems. The use of these prismatic beam expanders led to the multiple-prism dispersion theory.

Newton was the first to theorise the Goos–Hänchen effect, an optical phenomenon in which linearly polarised light undergoes a small lateral shift when totally internally reflected. He provided both experimental and theoretical explanations for it using a mechanical model.

Science came to realise the difference between perception of colour and mathematisable optics. The German poet Johann Wolfgang von Goethe could not shake the Newtonian foundation but "one hole Goethe did find in Newton's armour, ... Newton had committed himself to the doctrine that refraction without colour was impossible. He, therefore, thought that the object-glasses of telescopes must forever remain imperfect, achromatism and refraction being incompatible. This inference was proved by Dollond to be wrong."

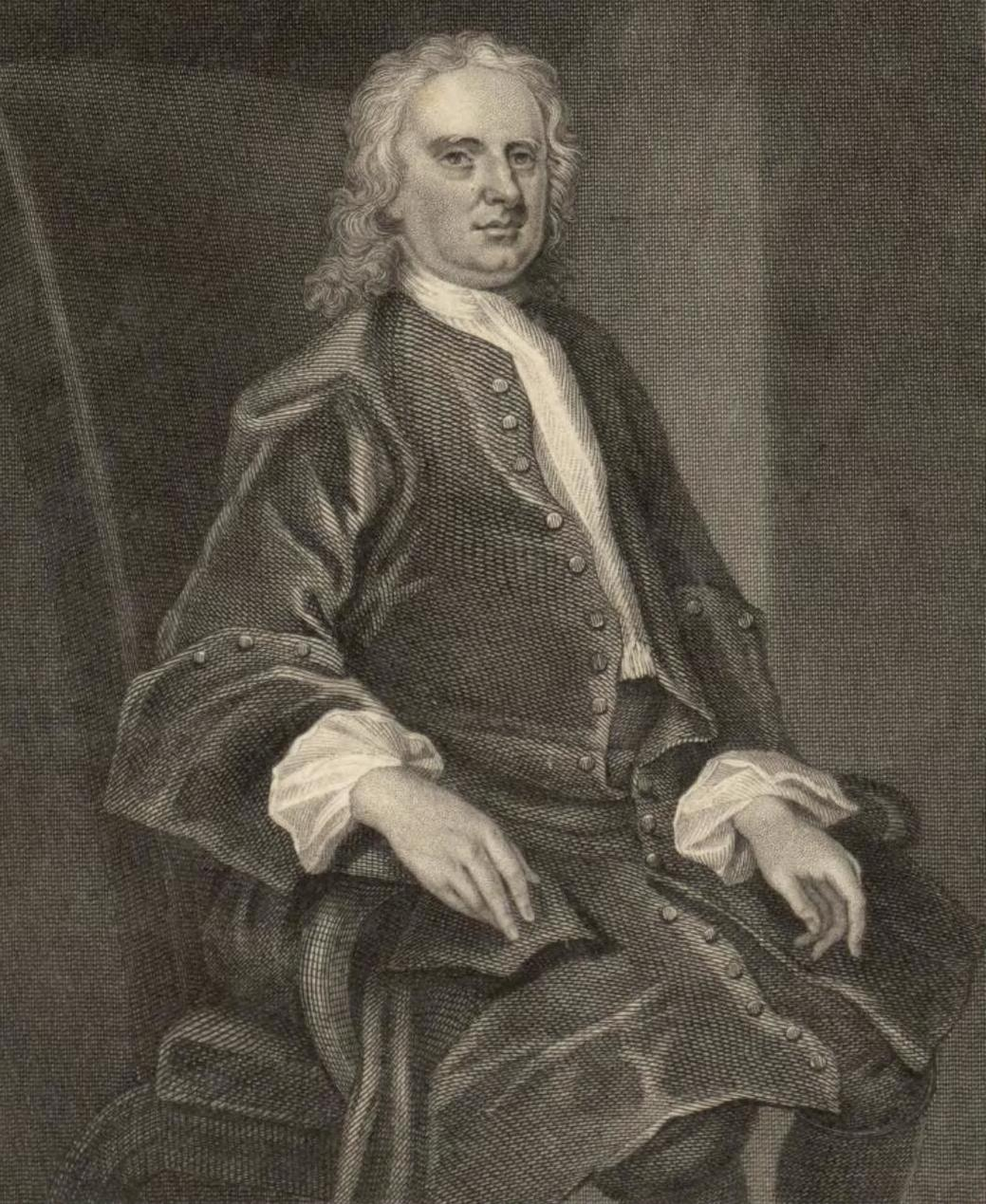
Engraving of Portrait of Newton by John Vanderbank

=== Philosophiæ Naturalis Principia Mathematica ===
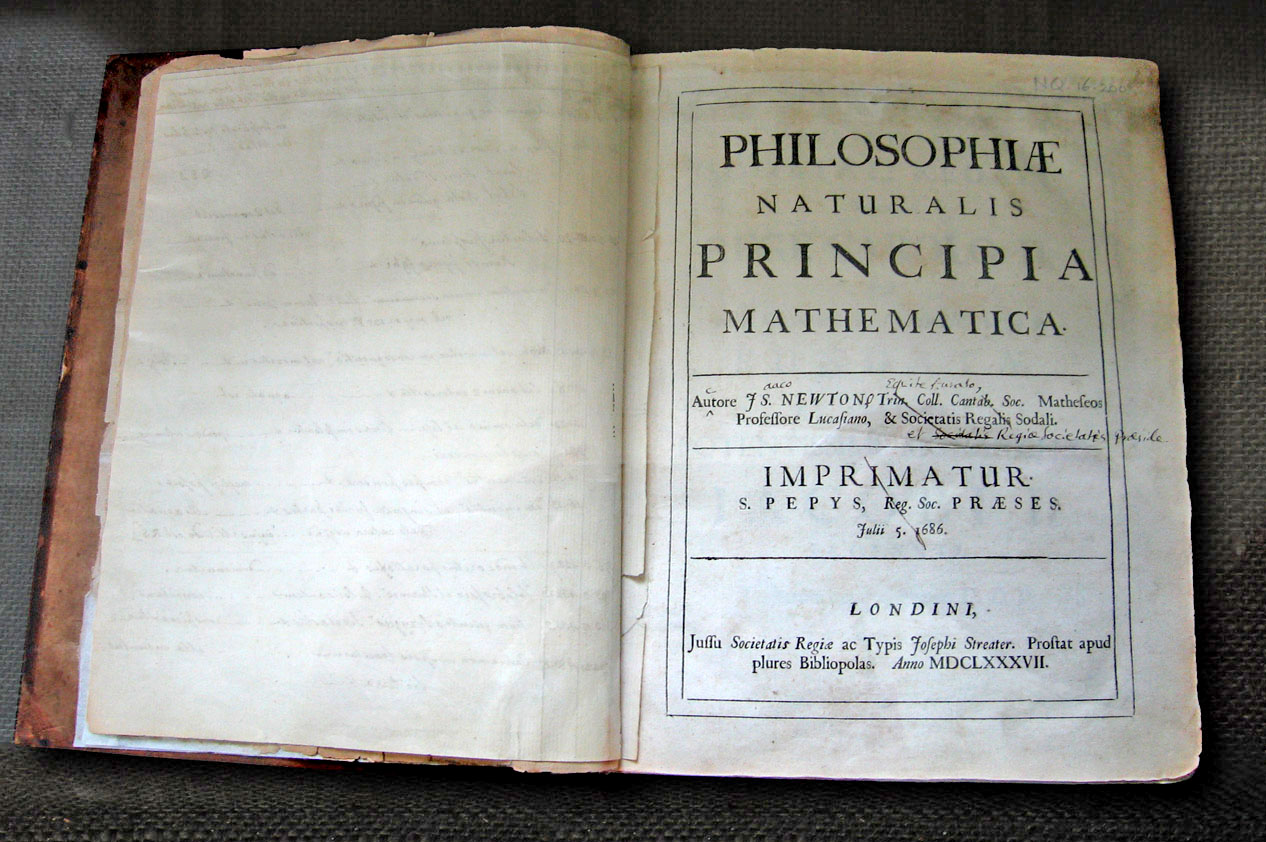
Newton's own copy of Principia with Newton's hand-written corrections for the second edition, now housed in the Wren Library at Trinity College, Cambridge

Newton had been developing his theory of gravitation as far back as 1665. In 1679, he returned to his work on celestial mechanics by considering gravitation and its effect on the orbits of planets with reference to Kepler's laws of planetary motion. Newton's reawakening interest in astronomical matters received further stimulus by the appearance of a comet in the winter of 1680–1681, on which he corresponded with John Flamsteed. After his exchanges with Robert Hooke, Newton worked out a proof that the elliptical form of planetary orbits would result from a centripetal force inversely proportional to the square of the radius vector. He shared his results with Edmond Halley and the Royal Society in De motu corporum in gyrum, a tract written on about nine sheets which was copied into the Royal Society's Register Book in December 1684. As part of this work, Newton also coined the term centripetal force. This tract contained the nucleus that Newton would develop and expand to form the Principia.

The Philosophiæ Naturalis Principia Mathematica was published on 5 July 1687 with encouragement and financial help from Halley. In this work, Newton stated the three universal laws of motion. Together, these laws describe the relationship between any object, the forces acting upon it and the resulting motion, laying the foundation for classical mechanics. They contributed to numerous advances during the Industrial Revolution and were not improved upon for more than 200 years. Many of these advances still underpin non-relativistic technologies today. Newton used the Latin word gravitas (weight) for the effect that would become known as gravity, and formulated the law of universal gravitation. His work achieved the first great unification in physics. He solved the two-body problem, and introduced the three-body problem.

In the same work, Newton presented a calculus-like method of geometrical analysis using 'first and last ratios', gave the first analytical determination (based on Boyle's law) of the speed of sound in air, inferred the oblateness of Earth's spheroidal figure, accounted for the precession of the equinoxes as a result of the Moon's gravitational attraction on the Earth's oblateness, initiated the gravitational study of the irregularities in the motion of the Moon, provided a theory for the determination of the orbits of comets, and much more. Newton's biographer David Brewster reported that the complexity of applying his theory of gravity to the motion of the moon was so great it affected Newton's health: "[H]e was deprived of his appetite and sleep" during his work on the problem in 1692–93, and told the astronomer John Machin that "his head never ached but when he was studying the subject". According to Brewster, Halley also told John Conduitt that when pressed to complete his analysis Newton "always replied that it made his head ache, and kept him awake so often, that he would think of it no more". [Emphasis in original] He provided the first calculation of the age of Earth by experiment, and also described a precursor to the modern wind tunnel.

Newton identified two "principal cases of attraction"—the inverse-square law and a central force proportional to distance—showing that both yield stable conic-section orbits and that spherically symmetric bodies behave as if their mass were concentrated at a point. In 21st century terms, this linear force law is mathematically equivalent to the force associated with the cosmological constant.

Through Book II of the Principia, Newton was an important pioneer of fluid mechanics, and later analysis has shown that of its 53 propositions almost all are correct, with only two or three open to question. Propositions 1–18 of the book are the first comprehensive treatment of motion under resistance proportional to velocity or its square, leading the scholar Richard S. Westfall to remark that 'almost without precedent, Newton created the scientific treatment of motion under conditions of resistance, that is, of motion as it is found in the world'. Proposition 15 showed that under an atmosphere whose density falls inversely with distance, a circular-orbiting body subject to drag will trace an equiangular spiral—a result later independently derived by Morduchow and Volpe (1973). In Section IX of Book II, he formulated the linear relation between viscous resistance and velocity gradient that now defines a Newtonian fluid, despite his experiments giving little direct insight into viscosity. Newton also discussed the circular motion of fluids and was the first to analyse Couette flow, initially in Proposition 51 for a single rotating cylinder and extended in Corollary 2 to the flow between two concentric cylinders. Further, he was the first to analyse the resistance of axisymmetric bodies moving through a rarefied medium.

In Principia, Newton provided the first quantitative estimate of the solar mass, with later editions incorporating more accurate measurements, bringing his Sun-to-Earth mass ratio calculation close to the more modern value. He further determined the masses and densities of Jupiter and Saturn, putting all four celestial bodies (Sun, Earth, Jupiter, and Saturn) on the same comparative scale. This achievement by Newton has been called "a supreme expression of the doctrine that one set of physical concepts and principles applies to all bodies on earth, the earth itself, and bodies anywhere throughout the universe".

Newton made clear his heliocentric view of the Solar System—developed in a somewhat more modern way because already in the mid-1680s he recognised the "deviation of the Sun" from the centre of gravity of the Solar System. For Newton, it was not precisely the centre of the Sun or any other body that could be considered at rest, but rather "the common centre of gravity of the Earth, the Sun and all the Planets is to be esteem'd the Centre of the World", and this centre of gravity "either is at rest or moves uniformly forward in a right line". (Newton adopted the "at rest" alternative in view of common consent that the centre, wherever it was, was at rest.)

Newton was criticised for introducing "occult agencies" into science because of his postulate of an invisible force able to act over vast distances. Later, in the second edition of the Principia (1713), Newton firmly rejected such criticisms in a concluding General Scholium, writing that it was enough that the phenomenon implied a gravitational attraction, as they did; but they did not so far indicate its cause, and it was both unnecessary and improper to frame hypotheses of things that were not implied by the phenomenon. (Here he used what became his famous expression "Hypotheses non fingo".)

With the Principia, Newton became internationally recognised. He acquired a circle of admirers, including the Swiss-born mathematician Nicolas Fatio de Duillier.

=== Other significant work ===
Newton studied heat and energy flow, formulating an empirical law of cooling which states that the rate at which an object cools is proportional to the temperature difference between the object and its surrounding environment. It was first formulated in 1701, being the first heat transfer formulation and serves as the formal basis of convective heat transfer, later being incorporated by Joseph Fourier into his work.

Newton was the first to observe and qualitatively describe what would much later be formalised as the Magnus effect, nearly two centuries before Heinrich Magnus's experimental studies. In a 1672 text, Newton recounted watching tennis players at Cambridge college and noted how a tennis ball struck obliquely with a spinning motion curved in flight. He explained that the ball's combination of circular and progressive motion caused one side to "press and beat the contiguous air more violently" than the other, thereby producing "a reluctancy and reaction of the air proportionably greater", an astute observation of the pressure differential responsible for lateral deflection.

=== Philosophy of science ===
"Hitherto I have not been able to discover the cause of those properties of gravity from phenomena, and I frame no hypotheses, for whatever is not deduced from the phenomena is to be called an hypothesis; and hypotheses, whether metaphysical or physical, whether of occult qualities or mechanical, have no place in experimental philosophy. In this philosophy particular propositions are inferred from the phenomena, and afterwards rendered general by induction".

— Isaac Newton, Philosophiæ Naturalis Principia Mathematica

Newton's role as a philosopher was deeply influential, and understanding the philosophical landscape of the late seventeenth and early eighteenth centuries requires recognising his central contributions. Historically, Newton was widely regarded as a core figure in philosophy. For example, Johann Jakob Brucker's Historia Critica Philosophiae (1744), considered the a comprehensive history of philosophy, prominently positioned Newton as a central philosophical figure. This portrayal shaped the perception of philosophy among leading Enlightenment intellectuals, including figures such as Denis Diderot, Jean le Rond d'Alembert, and Immanuel Kant.

Starting with the second edition of his Principia, Newton included a final section on science philosophy or method. It was here that he wrote his famous line, in Latin, "hypotheses non fingo", which can be translated as "I don't make hypotheses," (the direct translation of "fingo" is "frame", but in context he was advocating against the use of hypotheses in science). Newton's rejection of hypotheses ("hypotheses non fingo") emphasised that he refused to speculate on causes not directly supported by phenomena. Harper explains that Newton's experimental philosophy involves clearly distinguishing hypotheses—unverified conjectures—from propositions established through phenomena and generalised by induction. According to Newton, true scientific inquiry requires grounding explanations strictly on observable data rather than speculative reasoning. Thus, for Newton, proposing hypotheses without empirical backing undermines the integrity of experimental philosophy, as hypotheses should serve merely as tentative suggestions subordinate to observational evidence.

Newton contributed to and refined the scientific method. In his work on the properties of light in the 1670s, he showed his rigorous method, which was conducting experiments, taking detailed notes, making measurements, conducting more experiments that grew out of the initial ones, he formulated a theory, created more experiments to test it, and finally described the entire process so other scientists could replicate every step.

In his 1687 Principia, he outlined four rules, which together form the basis of science:

1. "Admit no more causes of natural things than are both true and sufficient to explain their appearances"
2. "To the same natural effect, assign the same causes"
3. "Qualities of bodies, which are found to belong to all bodies within experiments, are to be esteemed universal"
4. "Propositions collected from observation of phenomena should be viewed as accurate or very nearly true until contradicted by other phenomena"

Newton's scientific method went beyond simple prediction in three critical ways, thereby enriching the basic hypothetico-deductive model. First, it established a richer ideal of empirical success, requiring phenomena to accurately measure theoretical parameters. Second, it transformed theoretical questions into ones empirically solvable by measurement. Third, it used provisionally accepted propositions to guide research, enabling the method of successive approximations where deviations drive the creation of more accurate models. This robust method of theory-mediated measurements was adopted by his successors for extensions of his theory to astronomy and remains a foundational element in 21st century physics.

== Later life ==
=== Royal Mint ===
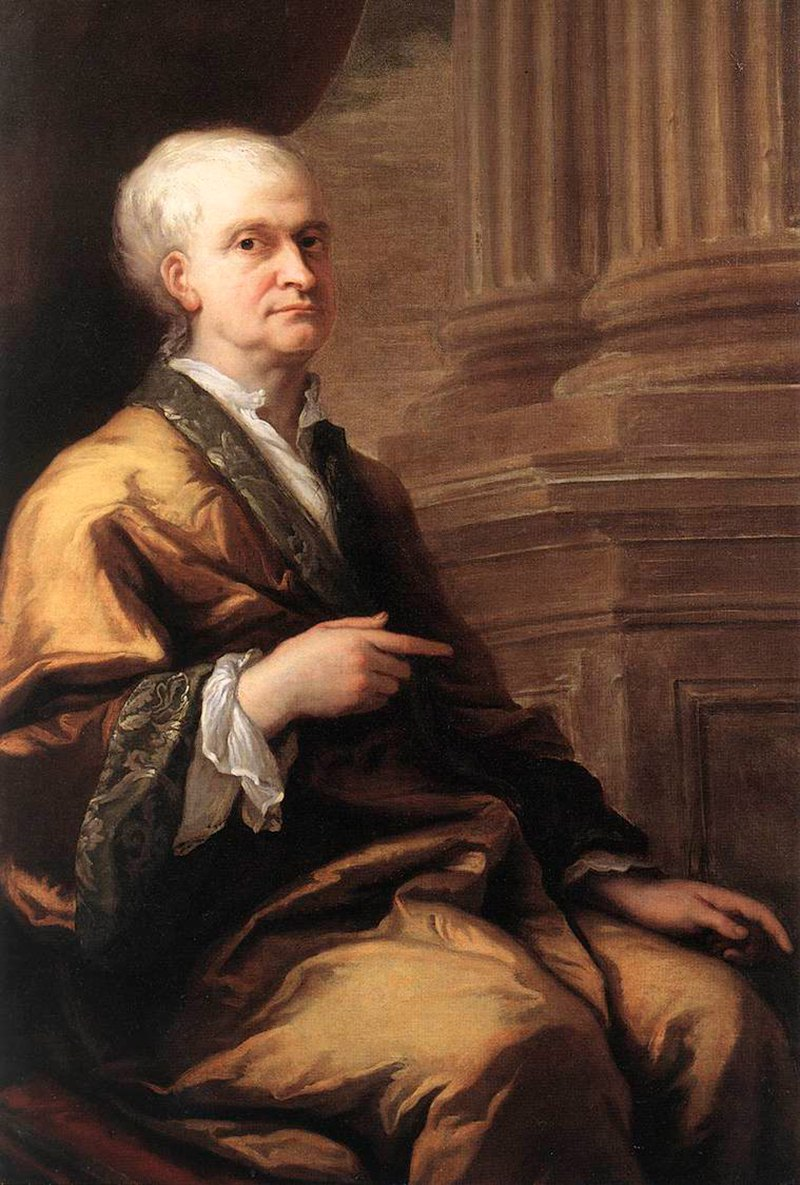
Newton in old age in 1712, portrait by Sir James Thornhill

In the 1690s, Newton wrote a number of religious tracts dealing with the literal and symbolic interpretation of the Bible. A manuscript Newton sent to John Locke in which he disputed the fidelity of 1 John 5:7—the Johannine Comma—and its fidelity to the original manuscripts of the New Testament, remained unpublished until 1785.

Newton was also a member of the Parliament of England for Cambridge University in 1689 and 1701, but according to some accounts his only comments were to complain about a cold draught in the chamber and request that the window be closed. He was, however, noted by the Cambridge diarist Abraham de la Pryme to have rebuked students who were frightening locals by claiming that a house was haunted.

Newton moved to London to take up the post of Warden of the Mint during the reign of King William III in 1696, a position that he had obtained through the patronage of Charles Montagu, 1st Earl of Halifax, then Chancellor of the Exchequer. He took charge of England's great recoining, clashed with Robert Lucas, 3rd Baron Lucas of Shenfield, the Governor of the Tower, and secured the job of deputy comptroller of the temporary Chester branch for Edmond Halley. Newton became perhaps the best-known Master of the Mint upon the death of Thomas Neale in 1699, a position he held for the last 30 years of his life. These appointments were intended as sinecures, but Newton took them seriously. He retired from his Cambridge duties in 1701, and exercised his authority to reform the currency and punish clippers and counterfeiters.

As Warden, and afterwards as Master, of the Royal Mint, Newton estimated that 20 per cent of the coins taken in during the Great Recoinage of 1696 were counterfeit. Counterfeiting was high treason, punishable by the felon being hanged, drawn and quartered. Despite this, convicting even the most flagrant criminals could be extremely difficult, but Newton proved equal to the task.

Disguised as a habitué of bars and taverns, he gathered much of that evidence himself. For all the barriers placed to prosecution, and separating the branches of government, English law still had ancient and formidable customs of authority. Newton had himself made a justice of the peace in all the home counties. A draft letter regarding the matter is included in Newton's personal first edition of Philosophiæ Naturalis Principia Mathematica, which he must have been amending at the time. Then he conducted more than 100 cross-examinations of witnesses, informers, and suspects between June 1698 and Christmas 1699. He successfully prosecuted 28 coiners, including the serial counterfeiter William Chaloner, whom historian John Craig described as "the most accomplished counterfeiter in the kingdom". Chaloner was hanged in 1699.

Beyond prosecuting counterfeiters, he improved minting technology and reduced the standard deviation of the weight of guineas from 1.3 grains to 0.75 grains. These improvements brought an end to the widespread practice of coin culling, in which goldsmiths and bankers removed overweight guineas from circulation to melt and remint them for profit. From 1707 onward, Newton also introduced the formal testing of one-pound samples of coins during trials of the pyx, effectively reducing the margin of admissible error. He ultimately saved the Treasury a then £41,510, roughly £3 million in 2012, with his improvements lasting until the 1770s, thereby increasing the accuracy of British coinage. He greatly increased the productivity of the Mint, as he raised the weekly output of coin from 15,000 pounds to 100,000 pounds. Newton has also been credited with pioneering time and motion studies, although his work was a theoretical calculation of physical capability rather than a standardised industrial productivity model.

Newton's activities at the Mint influenced rising scientific and commercial interests in fields such as numismatics, geology, mining, metallurgy, and metrology in the early 18th century.

In economics, Newton held views that anticipated aspects of modern monetary thought, believing that paper credit, such as government debt, was a practical and wise solution to the limitations of a currency based solely on metal. He argued that increasing the supply of this paper credit could lower interest rates, which would in turn stimulate trade and create employment. Newton also held a radical minority opinion that the value of both metal and paper currency was set by public opinion and trust.

Coat of arms of the Newton family of Great Gonerby, Lincolnshire, afterwards used by Sir Isaac

Newton was made president of the Royal Society in 1703 and an associate of the French Académie des Sciences. In his position at the Royal Society, Newton made an enemy of John Flamsteed, the Astronomer Royal, by prematurely publishing Flamsteed's Historia Coelestis Britannica, which Newton had used in his studies.

=== Knighthood ===
In April 1705, Newton was knighted by Queen Anne during a royal visit to Trinity College, Cambridge. The knighthood is likely to have been motivated by political considerations connected with the parliamentary election in May 1705, rather than any recognition of Newton's scientific work or services as Master of the Mint. Newton was the second scientist to be knighted, after Francis Bacon.

As a result of a report written by Newton on 21 September 1717 to the Lords Commissioners of His Majesty's Treasury, the bimetallic relationship between gold coins and silver coins was changed by royal proclamation on 22 December 1717, forbidding the exchange of gold guineas for more than 21 silver shillings. This inadvertently resulted in a silver shortage as silver coins were used to pay for imports, while exports were paid for in gold, effectively moving Britain from the silver standard to its first gold standard. It is a matter of debate as to whether he intended to do this or not. It has been argued that Newton viewed his work at the Mint as a continuation of his alchemical work.

Toward the end of his life, Newton spent some time at Cranbury Park, near Winchester, the country residence of his niece and her husband, though he primarily lived in London. His half-niece, Catherine Barton, served as his hostess in social affairs at his house on Jermyn Street in London. In a surviving letter written in 1700 while she was recovering from smallpox, Newton closed with the phrase "your very loving uncle", expressing familial concern in a manner typical of seventeenth-century epistolary style. The historian Patricia Fara notes that the letter's tone is warm and paternal, including medical advice and attention to her appearance during convalescence, rather than conveying any romantic implication.

=== Wealth ===
Newton was an active investor at times, including in the South Sea Company and lost at least £10,000, and plausibly more than £20,000 (£4.4 million in 2020) when it collapsed in the South Sea Bubble around 1720. Since Newton was already rich before the bubble, he still died rich, at estate value around £30,000, the equivalent of nearly £1 billion measured as a share of contemporary GDP, or roughly £6 million by standard inflation measures.

=== Death ===
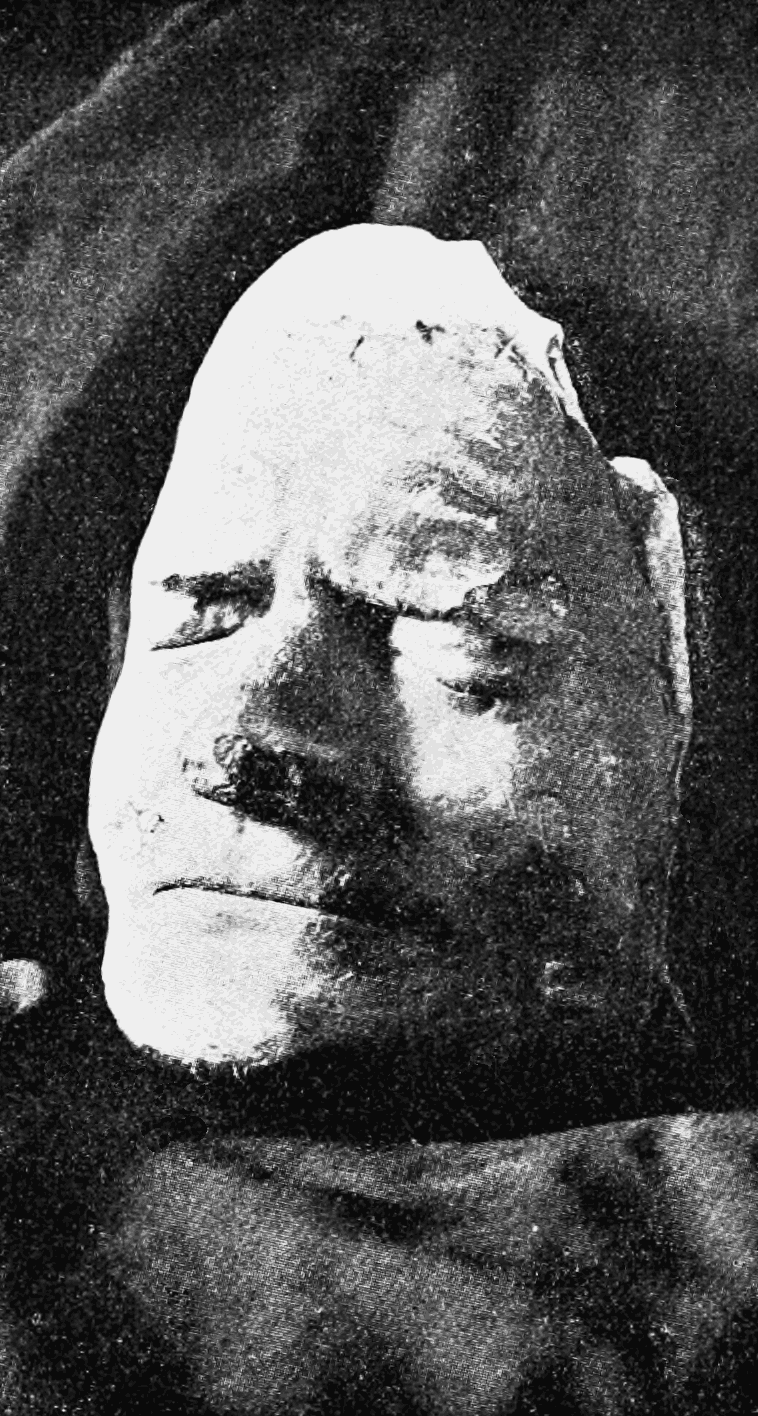
Death mask of Newton, photographed c. 1906

Newton died in his sleep in London on 20 March 1727 (NS 31 March 1727), aged 84. Newton was given a state funeral—the first in England for someone recognized primarily for intellectual achievement. The Lord Chancellor, two dukes, and three earls bore his pall, with most of the Royal Society following. His body lay in state in Westminster Abbey for eight days before burial in the nave. Newton was the first scientist to be buried in the abbey. Newton's death received sizable attention in the contemporary press. Several gazettes announced his death, while The Political State of Great Britain devoted three pages to praising his achievements and described him as "the greatest of Philosophers, and the Glory of the British Nation." Poet James Thomson's "Poem Sacred to the Memory of Sir Isaac Newton" also went through five editions before the end of the year. A bachelor, he had divested much of his estate to relatives during his last years, and died intestate. His papers went to John Conduitt and Catherine Barton.

Shortly after his death, a plaster death mask was moulded of Newton. It was used by the Flemish sculptor John Michael Rysbrack in making a sculpture of Newton. It is now held by the Royal Society.

Newton's hair was posthumously examined and found to contain mercury, probably resulting from his alchemical pursuits. Mercury poisoning could explain Newton's eccentricity in late life.

== Personality ==
Newton has been described as an incredibly driven and disciplined man who dedicated his life to his work. He is known for having a prodigious appetite for work, which he prioritised above his personal health. He maintained strict control over his physical appetites, being sparing with food and drink; contemporary accounts report that he refused to eat rabbits because they were strangled and avoided black pudding because it was made from blood. According to Catherine Conduitt, these choices were motivated by ethical concerns rather than personal taste, with Newton regarding strangling as a cruel method of killing animals and believing that consuming blood encouraged brutality. He has been described as an "incredible polymath" who was "immensely versatile", with some of his first studies relating to a potential phonetic alphabet and universal language. His interests also extended into economics and monetary affairs later in life. As the Master of the Mint, Newton became involved in combating counterfeiting and in matters concerning monetary theory and international currency.

Newton's diverse range of interests is seen in his library, which contained 1,752 books that could be identified. A large portion consisted of works on theology (27.2%, or 477 books), followed by alchemy (9.6%, 169 books), mathematics (7.2%, 126 books), physics (3.0%, 52 books), and finally astronomy (1.9%, 33 books). Ultimately, books related to his famous scientific work made up slightly less than 12% of the total collection.

Although it was claimed that he was once engaged, (Note: This claim was made by William Stukeley in 1727, in a letter about Newton written to Richard Mead. Charles Hutton, who in the late eighteenth century collected oral traditions about earlier scientists, declared that there "do not appear to be any sufficient reason for his never marrying, if he had an inclination so to do. It is much more likely that he had a constitutional indifference to the state, and even to the sex in general.") Newton never married. Voltaire, who was in London at the time of Newton's funeral, said that he "was never sensible to any passion, was not subject to the common frailties of mankind, nor had any commerce with women—a circumstance which was assured me by the physician and surgeon who attended him in his last moments."

Newton had a close friendship with the Swiss mathematician Nicolas Fatio de Duillier, whom he met in London around 1689; some of their correspondence has survived. Their relationship came to an abrupt and unexplained end in 1693, and at the same time Newton suffered a nervous breakdown, which included sending wild accusatory letters to his friends Samuel Pepys and John Locke. His note to the latter included the charge that Locke had endeavoured to "embroil" him with "woemen & by other means".

Newton appeared to be relatively modest about his achievements, writing in a later memoir, "I do not know what I may appear to the world, but to myself I seem to have been only like a boy playing on the sea-shore, and diverting myself in now and then finding a smoother pebble or a prettier shell than ordinary, whilst the great ocean of truth lay all undiscovered before me." Nonetheless, he could be fiercely competitive and did on occasion hold grudges against his intellectual rivals, not abstaining from personal attacks when it suited him—a common trait found in many of his contemporaries. In a letter to Robert Hooke in February 1675, for instance, he confessed "If I have seen further it is by standing on the shoulders of giants." Some historians argued that this, written at a time when Newton and Hooke were disputing over optical discoveries, was an oblique attack on Hooke who was presumably short and hunchbacked, rather than (or in addition to) a statement of modesty. On the other hand, the widely known proverb about standing on the shoulders of giants, found in the 17th-century poet George Herbert's Jacula Prudentum (1651) among others, had as its main point that "a dwarf on a giant's shoulders sees farther of the two", and so in effect place Newton himself rather than Hooke as the 'dwarf' who saw farther.

== Theology and chronology ==
=== Religious views ===
Although born into an Anglican family, by his thirties Newton had developed heterodox beliefs, with historian Stephen Snobelen labelling him a heretic. Despite this, Newton in his time was considered a knowledgeable and insightful theologian who was respected by his contemporaries, with Thomas Tenison, the then Archbishop of Canterbury, telling him "You know more divinity than all of us put together", and the philosopher John Locke describing him as "a very valuable man not onely for his wonderful skill in Mathematicks but in divinity too and his great knowledg in the Scriptures where in I know few his equals". By 1680, his reputation in biblical scholarship was established. John Mill sought his advice on a critical New Testament edition, and the two had a short correspondence on interpreting the early chapters of Genesis as well. Thomas Burnet consulted Newton on drafts of Telluris theoria sacra, and with Henry More he discussed the interpretation of the Apocalypse at Cambridge.

William Stukeley wrote of Newton's diligence in reading and studying the Bible:

No man in England read the Bible more carefully than he did, none study’d it more, as appears by his printed works, by many pieces he left which are not printed, and even by the Bible which he commonly used, thumbd over, as they call it, in an extraordinary degree, with frequency of use.

By 1672, he had started to record his theological researches in notebooks which he showed to no one and which have only been available for public examination since 1972. Over half of what Newton wrote concerned theology and alchemy, and most has never been printed. His writings show extensive knowledge of early Church texts and reveal that he sided with Arius, who rejected the conventional view of the Trinity and was the losing party in the conflict with Athanasius over the Creed. Newton "recognized Christ as a divine mediator between God and man, who was subordinate to the Father who created him." He was especially interested in prophecy, but for him, "the great apostasy was trinitarianism."

Newton tried unsuccessfully to obtain one of the two fellowships that exempted the holder from the ordination requirement. At the last moment in 1675, he received a government dispensation that excused him and all future holders of the Lucasian chair.

Worshipping Jesus Christ as God was, in Newton's eyes, idolatry, an act he believed to be the fundamental sin. In 1999, Snobelen wrote, that "Isaac Newton was a heretic. But ... he never made a public declaration of his private faith—which the orthodox would have deemed extremely radical. He hid his faith so well that scholars are still unraveling his personal beliefs." Snobelen concludes that Newton was at least a Socinian sympathiser (he owned and had thoroughly read at least eight Socinian books), possibly an Arian and almost certainly an anti-trinitarian.

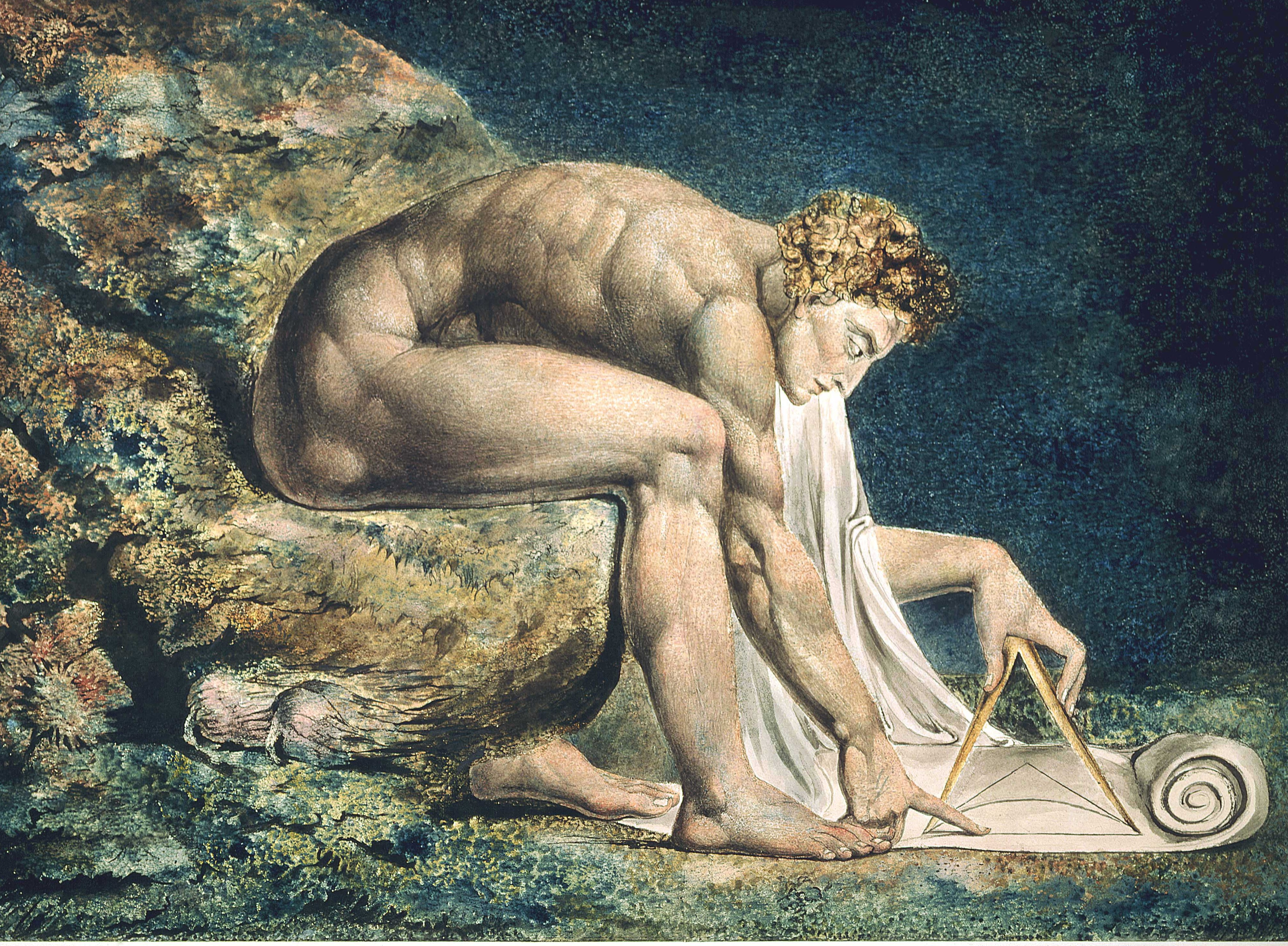
Newton (1795, detail) by William Blake. Newton is depicted critically as a "divine geometer".

Although the laws of motion and universal gravitation became Newton's best-known discoveries, he warned against using them to view the Universe as a mere machine, as if akin to a great clock. He said, "So then gravity may put the planets into motion, but without the Divine Power it could never put them into such a circulating motion, as they have about the sun".

Along with his scientific fame, Newton's studies of the Bible and of the early Church Fathers were also noteworthy. Newton wrote works on textual criticism, most notably An Historical Account of Two Notable Corruptions of Scripture and Observations upon the Prophecies of Daniel, and the Apocalypse of St. John. He placed the crucifixion of Jesus Christ at 3 April, AD 33, which agrees with one traditionally accepted date.

He believed in a rationally immanent world, but he rejected the hylozoism implicit in Gottfried Wilhelm Leibniz and Baruch Spinoza. The ordered and dynamically informed Universe could be understood, and must be understood, by an active reason. In his correspondence, he claimed that in writing the Principia "I had an eye upon such Principles as might work with considering men for the belief of a Deity". He saw evidence of design in the system of the world: "Such a wonderful uniformity in the planetary system must be allowed the effect of choice". But Newton insisted that divine intervention would eventually be required to reform the system, due to the slow growth of instabilities. For this, Leibniz lampooned him: "God Almighty wants to wind up his watch from time to time: otherwise it would cease to move. He had not, it seems, sufficient foresight to make it a perpetual motion."

Newton's position was defended by his follower Samuel Clarke in a famous correspondence. A century later, Pierre-Simon Laplace's work Celestial Mechanics had a natural explanation for why the planet orbits do not require periodic divine intervention. The contrast between Laplace's mechanistic worldview and Newton's one is the most strident considering the famous answer which the French scientist gave Napoleon, who had criticised him for the absence of the Creator in the Mécanique céleste: "Sire, j'ai pu me passer de cette hypothèse" ("Sir, I can do without this hypothesis").

Scholars long debated whether Newton disputed the doctrine of the Trinity. His first biographer, David Brewster, who compiled his manuscripts, interpreted Newton as questioning the veracity of some passages used to support the Trinity, but never denying the doctrine of the Trinity as such. In the twentieth century, encrypted manuscripts written by Newton and bought by John Maynard Keynes (among others) were deciphered and it became known that Newton did indeed reject Trinitarianism.

Newton broadly endorsed the future restoration of the Jews to the Land of Israel as a component of biblical prophecy while refraining from assigning it a precise date. This view was widely shared among seventeenth- and early eighteenth-century theologians and natural philosophers, including figures connected to the Royal Society and the universities. For Newton and his contemporaries, such as Locke and Daniel Whitby, belief in a future restoration functioned less as a statement about contemporary Jewish communities than as a theological response to deist critiques, reinforcing the messianic claims of Christianity through appeals to fulfilled and anticipated prophecy.

=== Religious thought ===
Newton and Robert Boyle's approach to mechanical philosophy was promoted by rationalist pamphleteers as a viable alternative to pantheism and enthusiasm. It was accepted hesitantly by orthodox preachers as well as dissident preachers like the latitudinarians. The clarity and simplicity of science was seen as a way to combat the emotional and metaphysical superlatives of both superstitious enthusiasm and the threat of atheism, and at the same time, the second wave of English deists used Newton's discoveries to demonstrate the possibility of a "Natural Religion".

The attacks made against pre-Enlightenment "magical thinking", and the mystical elements of Christianity, were given their foundation with Boyle's mechanical conception of the universe. Newton gave Boyle's ideas their completion through mathematical proofs and was very successful in popularising them.

=== Historical studies ===
Newton devoted considerable attention to ancient history and chronology over the last four decades of his life. His investigations developed from his study of ancient mathematics and natural philosophy, expanding into the history of religion and the development of early civilizations. He sought to reconstruct universal history by reconciling biblical accounts with Greek, Egyptian, and other ancient traditions. Applying a methodology similar to that of his scientific research, Newton worked backward from comparatively well-established historical events to reconstruct earlier periods. He compared ancient historical accounts, genealogies, regnal lists, and myths, and employed demographic calculations and estimates of royal reigns to revise conventional chronologies. He also examined the historical development and textual transmission of Christianity, arguing that theological doctrines and biblical passages had undergone later corruption.

Newton also used astronomical observations, particularly the precession of the equinoxes, to establish dates for ancient events. His historical investigations culminated in The Chronology of Ancient Kingdoms Amended, published posthumously in 1728, which proposed a substantially revised chronology of the ancient world. The work attracted considerable scholarly attention and controversy. Historian Mordechai Feingold emphasizes Newton's ingenuity and extensive intellectual effort in reconstructing universal history, while noting his selective use of historical evidence and the limitations of his chronological conclusions.

== Alchemy ==
Newton was not the first of the age of reason. He was the last of the magicians, the last of the Babylonians and Sumerians, the last great mind which looked out on the visible and intellectual world with the same eyes as those who began to build our intellectual inheritance rather less than 10,000 years ago. Isaac Newton, a posthumous child born with no father on Christmas Day, 1642, was the last wonderchild to whom the Magi could do sincere and appropriate homage.

— John Maynard Keynes, "Newton, the Man"

Of an estimated ten million words of writing in Newton's papers, about one million deal with alchemy. Many of Newton's writings on alchemy are copies of other manuscripts, with his own annotations. Alchemical texts mix artisanal knowledge with philosophical speculation, often hidden behind layers of wordplay, allegory, and imagery to protect craft secrets. Some of the content contained in Newton's papers could have been considered heretical by the church.

In 1888, after spending sixteen years cataloguing Newton's papers, Cambridge University kept a small number and returned the rest to the Earl of Portsmouth. In 1936, a descendant offered the papers for sale at Sotheby's. The collection was broken up and sold for a total of about £9,000. John Maynard Keynes was one of about three dozen bidders who obtained part of the collection at auction. Keynes went on to reassemble an estimated half of Newton's collection of papers on alchemy before donating his collection to Cambridge University in 1946.

All of Newton's known writings on alchemy are currently being put online in a project undertaken by Indiana University: "The Chymistry of Isaac Newton" and has been summarised in a book.

Newton's fundamental contributions to science include the quantification of gravitational attraction, the discovery that white light is actually a mixture of immutable spectral colors, and the formulation of the calculus. Yet there is another, more mysterious side to Newton that is imperfectly known, a realm of activity that spanned some thirty years of his life, although he kept it largely hidden from his contemporaries and colleagues. We refer to Newton's involvement in the discipline of alchemy, or as it was often called in seventeenth-century England, "chymistry."

In June 2020, two unpublished pages of Newton's notes on Jan Baptist van Helmont's book on plague, De Peste, were being auctioned online by Bonhams. Newton's analysis of this book, which he made in Cambridge while protecting himself from London's 1665–66 epidemic of the bubonic plague, is the most substantial written statement he is known to have made about the plague, according to Bonhams. As far as the therapy is concerned, Newton writes that "the best is a toad suspended by the legs in a chimney for three days, which at last vomited up earth with various insects in it, on to a dish of yellow wax, and shortly after died. Combining powdered toad with the excretions and serum made into lozenges and worn about the affected area drove away the contagion and drew out the poison".

== Legacy ==
=== Recognition ===
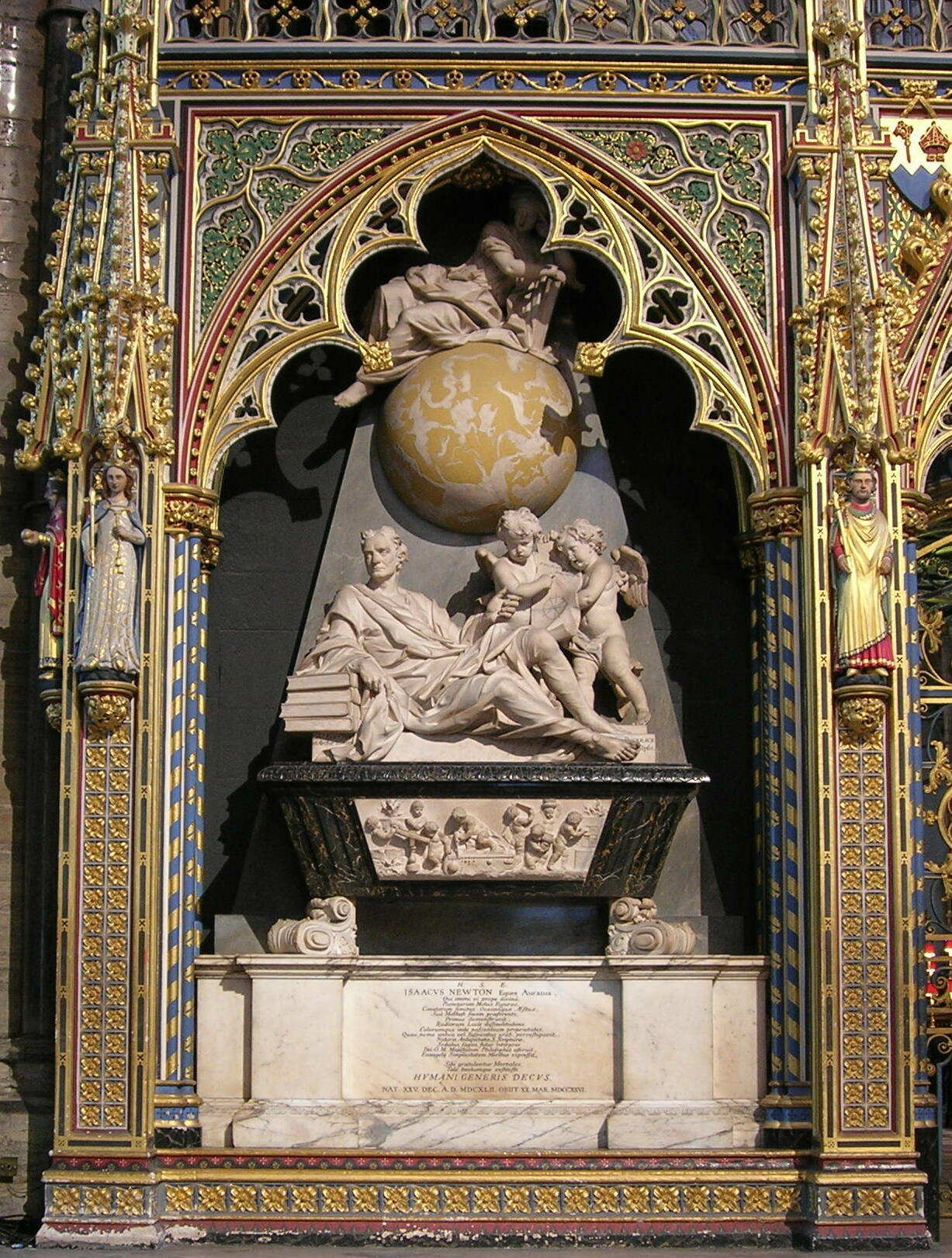
Newton's tomb monument in Westminster Abbey by John Michael Rysbrack

The mathematician and physicist Joseph-Louis Lagrange frequently asserted that Newton was the greatest genius who ever lived, and once added that Newton was also "the most fortunate, for we cannot find more than once a system of the world to establish." The English poet Alexander Pope wrote the famous epitaph:

Nature, and Nature's laws lay hid in night.
God said, Let Newton be! and all was light.

But this was not allowed to be inscribed in Newton's monument at Westminster. The epitaph added is as follows:

H. S. E. ISAACUS NEWTON Eques Auratus, / Qui, animi vi prope divinâ, / Planetarum Motus, Figuras, / Cometarum semitas, Oceanique Aestus. Suâ Mathesi facem praeferente / Primus demonstravit: / Radiorum Lucis dissimilitudines, / Colorumque inde nascentium proprietates, / Quas nemo antea vel suspicatus erat, pervestigavit. / Naturae, Antiquitatis, S. Scripturae, / Sedulus, sagax, fidus Interpres / Dei O. M. Majestatem Philosophiâ asseruit, / Evangelij Simplicitatem Moribus expressit. / Sibi gratulentur Mortales, / Tale tantumque exstitisse / HUMANI GENERIS DECUS. / NAT. XXV DEC. A.D. MDCXLII. OBIIT. XX. MAR. MDCCXXVI,

which can be translated as follows:

Here is buried Isaac Newton, Knight, who by a strength of mind almost divine, and mathematical principles peculiarly his own, explored the course and figures of the planets, the paths of comets, the tides of the sea, the dissimilarities in rays of light, and, what no other scholar has previously imagined, the properties of the colours thus produced. Diligent, sagacious and faithful, in his expositions of nature, antiquity and the holy Scriptures, he vindicated by his philosophy the majesty of God mighty and good, and expressed the simplicity of the Gospel in his manners. Mortals rejoice that there has existed such and so great an ornament of the human race! He was born on 25th December 1642, and died on 20th March 1726.

Science writer John G. Simmons ranked Newton first in The Scientific 100, based on a qualitative assessment in which he ordered the scientists according to overall influence, and described him as "the most influential figure in the history of Western science". Physicist Peter Rowlands described him as "the central figure in the history of science", who "more than anyone else is the source of our great confidence in the power of science." New Scientist called Newton "the supreme genius and most enigmatic character in the history of science". The philosopher and historian David Hume also declared that Newton was "the greatest and rarest genius that ever arose for the ornament and instruction of the species". In his home of Monticello, Thomas Jefferson, a Founding Father and President of the United States, kept portraits of John Locke, Sir Francis Bacon, and Newton, whom he described as "the three greatest men that have ever lived, without any exception", and who he credited with laying "the foundation of those superstructures which have been raised in the Physical and Moral sciences". The writer and philosopher Voltaire wrote of Newton that "If all the geniuses of the universe were assembled, Newton should lead the band". The neurologist and psychoanalyst Ernest Jones wrote of Newton as "the greatest genius of all times". The mathematician Guillaume de l'Hôpital had a mythical reverence for Newton, which he expressed with a profound question and statement: "Does Mr. Newton eat, or drink, or sleep like other men? I represent him to myself as a celestial genius, entirely disengaged from matter."

Newton has further been called "the towering figure of the Scientific Revolution" and that "In a period rich with outstanding thinkers, Newton was simply the most outstanding." The polymath Johann Wolfgang von Goethe labelled the year in which Galileo Galilei died and Newton was born, 1642, as the "Christmas of the modern age". In the polymath Vilfredo Pareto's estimation, Newton was the greatest human being who ever lived. On the bicentennial of Newton's death in 1927, the astronomer James Jeans stated that he "was certainly the greatest man of science, and perhaps the greatest intellect, the human race has seen". The physicist Peter Rowlands also notes that Newton was "possibly possessed of the most powerful intellect in the whole of human history". Newton conceived four revolutions—in optics, mathematics, mechanics, and gravity—but also foresaw a fifth in electricity, though he lacked the time and energy in old age to fully accomplish it. Newton's work is considered the most influential in bringing forth science.

The historian of science James Gleick noted that Newton "discovered more of the essential core of human knowledge than anyone before or after", and wrote further:

He was chief architect of the modern world. He answered the ancient philosophical riddles of light and motion, and he effectively discovered gravity. He showed how to predict the courses of heavenly bodies and so established our place in the cosmos. He made knowledge a thing of substance: quantitative and exact. He established principles, and they are called his laws.

The physicist Ludwig Boltzmann called Newton's Principia "the first and greatest work ever written about theoretical physics". Physicist Stephen Hawking similarly called Principia "probably the most important single work ever published in the physical sciences". The mathematician and physicist Joseph-Louis Lagrange called Principia "the greatest production of the human mind", and noted that "he felt dazed at such an illustration of what man's intellect might be capable".

Physicist Edward Andrade stated that Newton "was capable of greater sustained mental effort than any man, before or since". He also noted the place of Newton in history, stating:

From time to time in the history of mankind a man arises who is of universal significance, whose work changes the current of human thought or of human experience, so that all that comes after him bears evidence of his spirit. Such a man was Shakespeare, such a man was Beethoven, such a man was Newton, and, of the three, his kingdom is the most widespread.

The French physicist and mathematician Jean-Baptiste Biot praised Newton's genius, stating that:

Never was the supremacy of intellect so justly established and so fully confessed . . . In mathematical and in experimental science without an equal and without an example; combining the genius for both in its highest degree.

Despite his rivalry with Gottfried Wilhelm Leibniz, Leibniz still praised the work of Newton, with him responding to a question at a dinner in 1701 from Sophia Charlotte, the Queen of Prussia, about his view of Newton with:

Taking mathematics from the beginning of the world to the time of when Newton lived, what he had done was much the better half.

The mathematician E.T. Bell ranked Newton alongside Carl Friedrich Gauss and Archimedes as the three greatest mathematicians of all time, with the mathematician Donald M. Davis also noting that Newton is generally ranked with the other two as the greatest mathematicians ever. In his 1962 paper from the journal The Mathematics Teacher, the mathematician Walter Crosby Eells attempted a quantitative ranking of mathematicians based on the amount of space devoted to them in reference works; Newton was ranked first out of a list of the top 100, a position that remained first even after probable error was taken into account in the study. In his book Wonders of Numbers in 2001, the science editor and author Clifford A. Pickover ranked his top ten most influential mathematicians that ever lived, placing Newton first in the list. In The Cambridge Companion to Isaac Newton (2016), he is described as being "from a very young age, an extraordinary problem-solver, as good, it would appear, as humanity has ever produced". He is ultimately ranked among the top two or three greatest theoretical scientists ever, alongside James Clerk Maxwell and Albert Einstein, the greatest mathematician ever alongside Carl F. Gauss, and in the first rank of experimentalists, thereby putting "Newton in a class by himself among empirical scientists, for one has trouble in thinking of any other candidate who was in the first rank of even two of these categories." Also noted is "At least in comparison to subsequent scientists, Newton was also exceptional in his ability to put his scientific effort in much wider perspective". Gauss himself had Archimedes and Newton as his heroes, and used terms such as clarissimus or magnus to describe other intellectuals such as great mathematicians and philosophers, but reserved summus for Newton only, and once realising the immense influence of Newton's work on scientists such as Lagrange and Pierre-Simon Laplace, Gauss then exclaimed that "Newton remains forever the master of all masters!"

In his book Great Physicists, the chemist William H. Cropper highlighted the unparalleled genius of Newton, stating:

On one assessment there should be no doubt: Newton was the greatest creative genius physics has ever seen. None of the other candidates for the superlative (Einstein, Maxwell, Boltzmann, Gibbs, and Feynman) has matched Newton's combined achievements as theoretician, experimentalist, and mathematician.

Albert Einstein kept a picture of Newton on his study wall alongside ones of Michael Faraday and of James Clerk Maxwell. Einstein stated that Newton's creation of calculus in relation to his laws of motion was "perhaps the greatest advance in thought that a single individual was ever privileged to make." He also noted the influence of Newton, stating that:

The whole evolution of our ideas about the processes of nature, with which we have been concerned so far, might be regarded as an organic development of Newton's ideas.

In 1999, an opinion poll of 100 of the day's leading physicists voted Einstein the "greatest physicist ever," with Newton the runner-up, while a parallel survey of rank-and-file physicists ranked Newton as the greatest. In 2005, a dual survey of the public and members of Britain's Royal Society asked two questions: who made the bigger overall contributions to science and who made the bigger positive contributions to humankind, with the candidates being Newton or Einstein. In both groups, and for both questions, the consensus was that Newton had made the greater overall contributions.

In 1999 Time magazine named Newton the Person of the Century for the 17th century. Newton placed sixth in the 100 Greatest Britons poll conducted by BBC in 2002. However, in 2003, he was voted as the greatest Briton in a poll conducted by BBC World, with Winston Churchill second. He was voted as the greatest Cantabrigian by University of Cambridge students in 2009.

The physicist Lev Landau ranked physicists on a logarithmic scale of productivity and genius ranging from 0 to 5. The highest ranking, 0, was assigned to Newton. Einstein was ranked 0.5. A rank of 1 was awarded to the fathers of quantum mechanics, such as Werner Heisenberg and Paul Dirac. Landau, a Nobel prize winner and the discoverer of superfluidity, ranked himself as 2.

The SI derived unit of force is named the newton in his honour.

Most of Newton's surviving scientific and technical papers are kept at Cambridge University. Cambridge University Library has the largest collection and there are also papers in Kings College, Trinity College, and the Fitzwilliam Museum. There is an archive of theological and alchemical papers in the National Library of Israel, and smaller collections at the Smithsonian Institution, Stanford University Library, and the Huntington Library. The Royal Society in London also has some manuscripts. The Israel collection was inscribed by UNESCO on its Memory of the World International Register in 2015, recognising the global significance of the documents. The Cambridge and Royal Society collections were added to this inscription in 2017.

=== Apple story ===
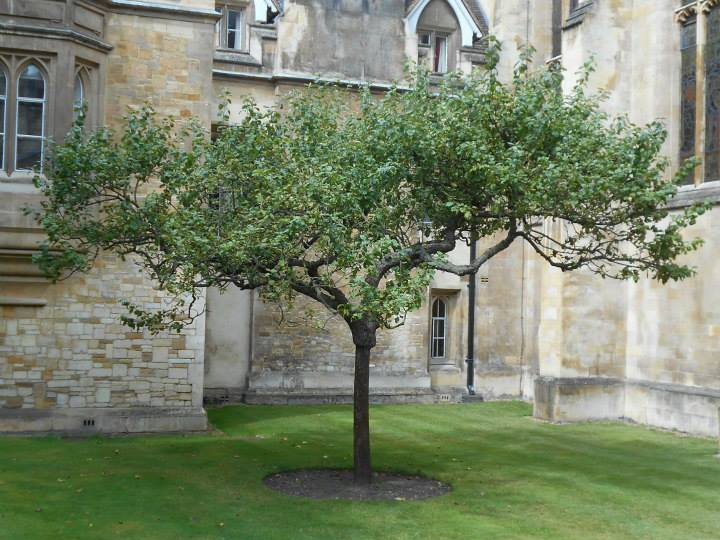
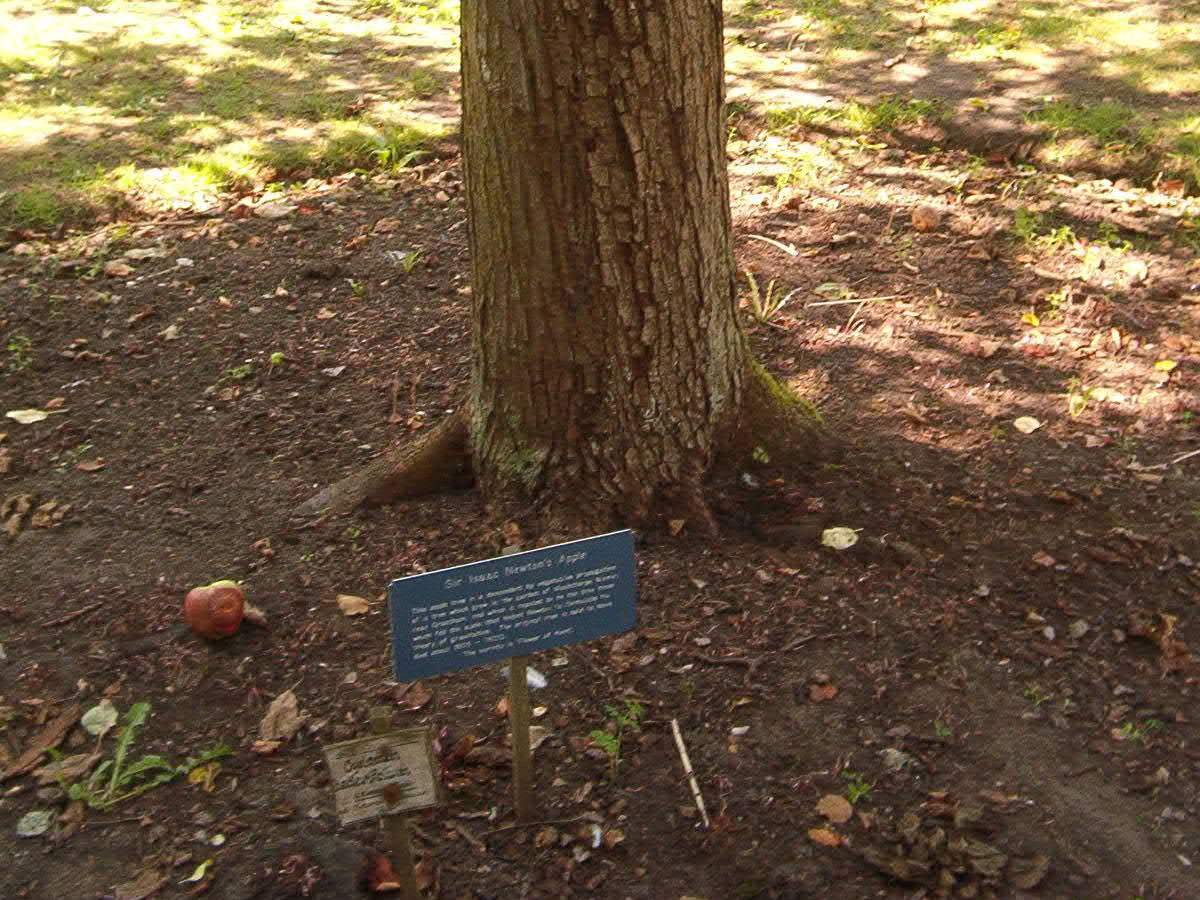

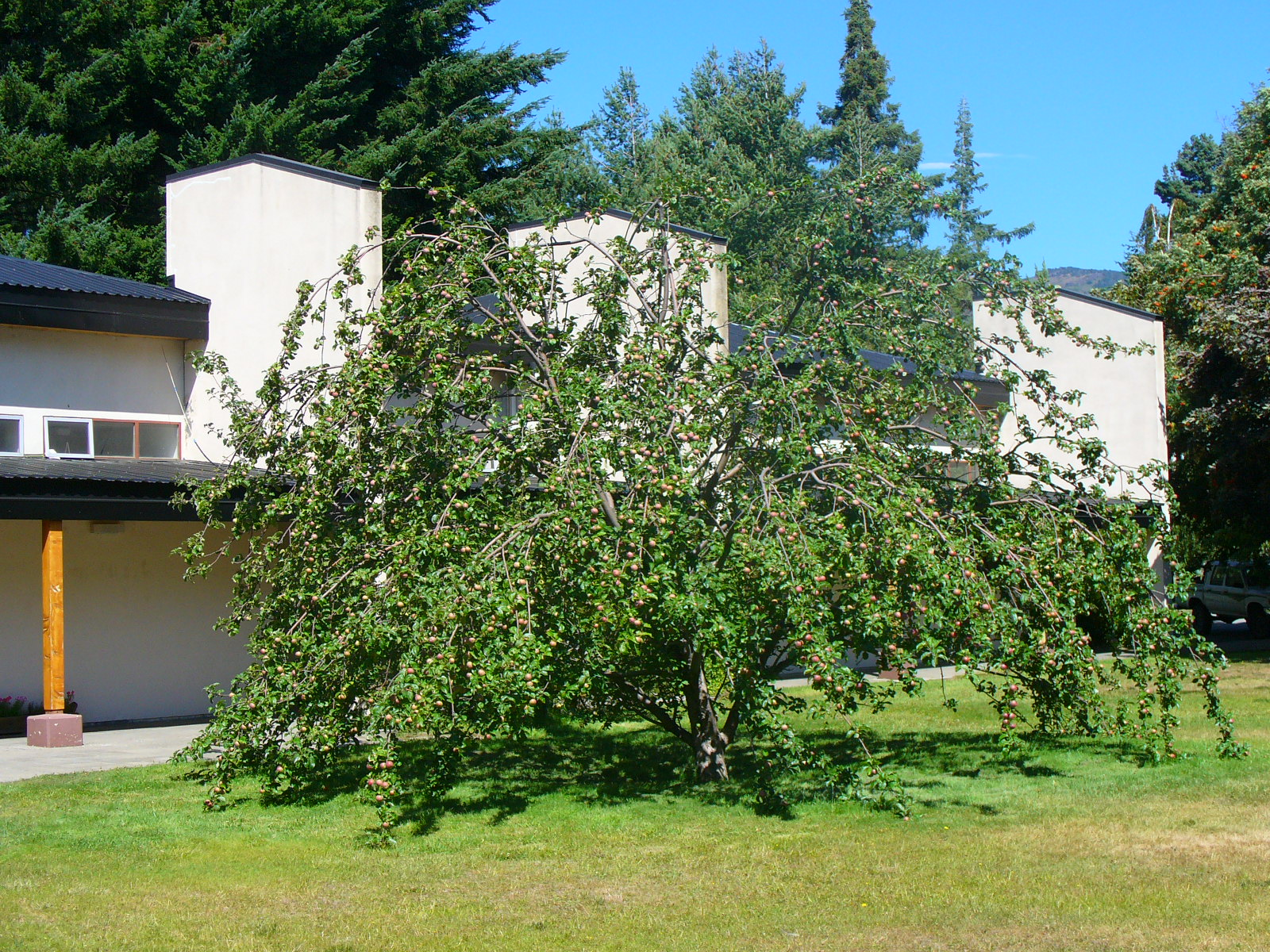
Reputed descendants of Newton's apple tree at (from top to bottom): Trinity College, Cambridge, the Cambridge University Botanic Garden, and the Instituto Balseiro library garden in Argentina

Newton often told the story that he was inspired to formulate his theory of gravitation by watching the fall of an apple from a tree. The story is believed to have passed into popular knowledge after being related by Catherine Barton, Newton's niece, to Voltaire. Voltaire then wrote in his Essay on Epic Poetry (1727), "Sir Isaac Newton walking in his gardens, had the first thought of his system of gravitation, upon seeing an apple falling from a tree."

Although some question the veracity of the apple story, acquaintances of Newton attribute the story to Newton himself, though not the apocryphal version that the apple actually hit Newton's head. William Stukeley, whose manuscript account of 1752 has been made available by the Royal Society, recorded a conversation with Newton in Kensington on 15 April 1726:

we went into the garden, & drank thea under the shade of some appletrees, only he, & myself. amidst other discourse, he told me, he was just in the same situation, as when formerly, the notion of gravitation came into his mind. "why should that apple always descend perpendicularly to the ground," thought he to him self: occasion'd by the fall of an apple, as he sat in a comtemplative mood: "why should it not go sideways, or upwards? but constantly to the earths centre? assuredly, the reason is, that the earth draws it. there must be a drawing power in matter. & the sum of the drawing power in the matter of the earth must be in the earths center, not in any side of the earth. therefore dos this apple fall perpendicularly, or toward the center. if matter thus draws matter; it must be in proportion of its quantity. therefore the apple draws the earth, as well as the earth draws the apple."

John Conduitt, Newton's assistant at the Royal Mint and husband of Newton's niece, also described the event when he wrote about Newton's life:

In the year 1666 he retired again from Cambridge to his mother in Lincolnshire. Whilst he was pensively meandering in a garden it came into his thought that the power of gravity (which brought an apple from a tree to the ground) was not limited to a certain distance from earth, but that this power must extend much further than was usually thought. Why not as high as the Moon said he to himself & if so, that must influence her motion & perhaps retain her in her orbit, whereupon he fell a calculating what would be the effect of that supposition.

It is known from his notebooks that Newton was grappling in the late 1660s with the idea that terrestrial gravity extends, in an inverse-square proportion, to the Moon, as other scientists had already conjectured. Around 1665, Newton made quantitative analysis, considering the period and distance of the Moon's orbit and considering the timing of objects falling on Earth. Newton did not publish these results at the time because he could not prove that the Earth's gravity acts as if all its mass were concentrated at its center. That proof took him twenty years.

Detailed analysis of historical accounts backed up by dendrochronology and DNA analysis indicate that the sole apple tree in a garden at Woolsthorpe Manor was the tree Newton described. The tree blew over in at storm sometime around 1816, regrew from its roots, and continues as a tourist attraction under the care of the National Trust.

A descendant of the original tree can be seen growing outside the main gate of Trinity College, Cambridge, below the room Newton lived in when he studied there. The National Fruit Collection at Brogdale in Kent can supply grafts from their tree, which appears identical to Flower of Kent, a coarse-fleshed cooking variety.

=== Commemorations ===
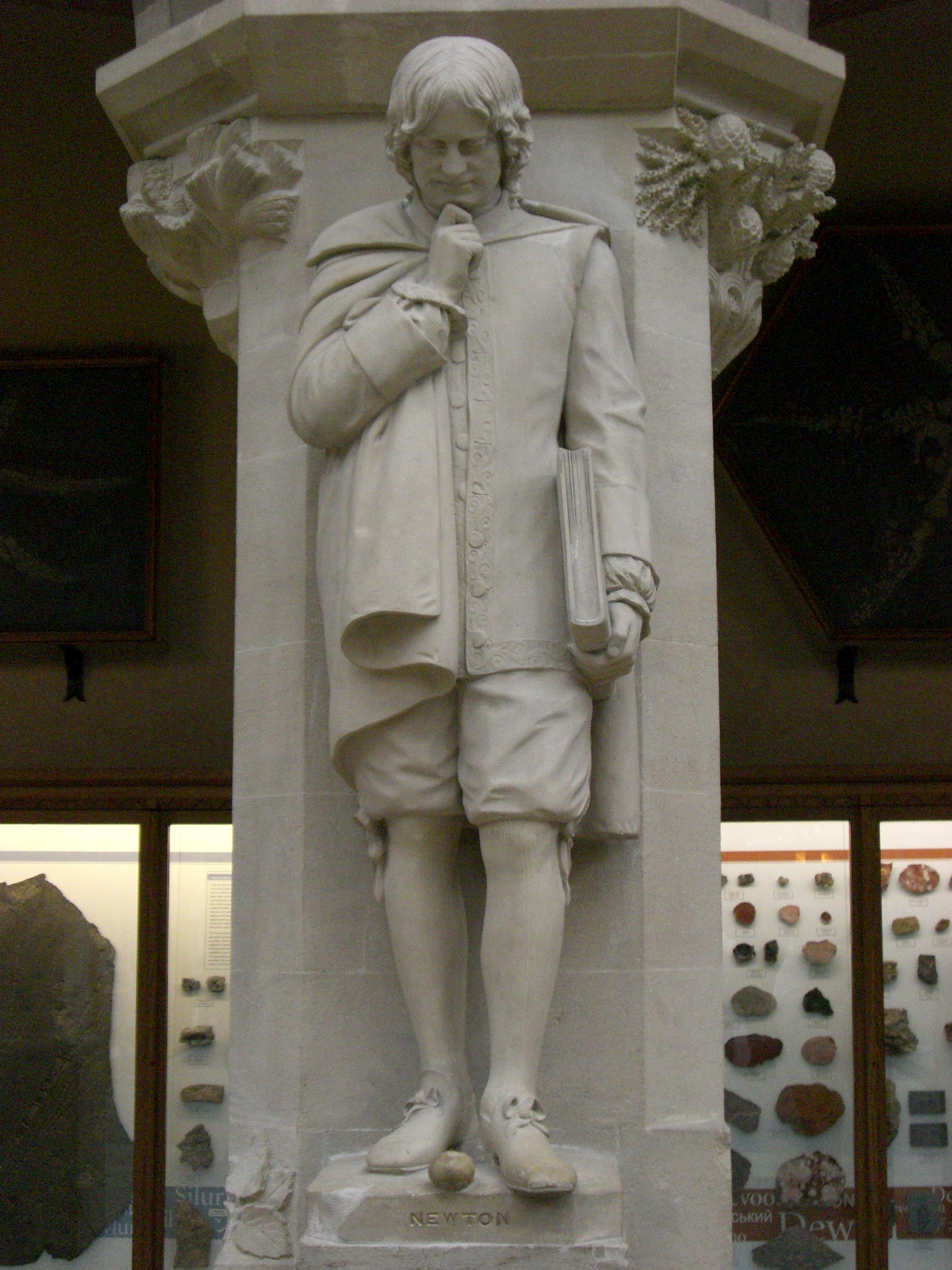
Newton statue on display at the Oxford University Museum of Natural History portrays him contemplating the fallen apple.

Newton's monument (1731) can be seen in Westminster Abbey, at the north of the entrance to the choir against the choir screen, near his tomb. It was executed by the sculptor Michael Rysbrack (1694–1770) in white and grey marble with design by the architect William Kent. The monument features a figure of Newton reclining on top of a sarcophagus, his right elbow resting on several of his great books and his left hand pointing to a scroll with a mathematical design. Above him is a pyramid and a celestial globe showing the signs of the Zodiac and the path of the comet of 1680. A relief panel depicts putti using instruments such as a telescope and prism.

From 1978 until 1988, an image of Newton designed by Harry Ecclestone appeared on Series D £1 banknotes issued by the Bank of England (the last £1 notes to be issued by the Bank of England). Newton was shown on the reverse of the notes holding a book and accompanied by a telescope, a prism and a map of the Solar System.

A statue of Isaac Newton, looking at an apple at his feet, can be seen at the Oxford University Museum of Natural History. A large bronze statue, Newton, after William Blake, by Eduardo Paolozzi, dated 1995 and inspired by William Blake's etching, dominates the piazza of the British Library in London. A bronze statue of Newton was erected in 1858 in the centre of Grantham where he went to school, prominently standing in front of Grantham Guildhall.

The manor house at Woolsthorpe is a Grade I listed building by Historic England through being his birthplace and "where he discovered gravity and developed his theories regarding the refraction of light".

The Isaac Newton Institute for Mathematical Sciences, an international research institute for mathematics and its applications at the University of Cambridge, is named in Newton's honour.

The Institute of Physics, or IOP, has its highest and most prestigious award, the Isaac Newton Medal, named after Newton, which is given for world-leading contributions to physics. It was first awarded in 2008.

== The Enlightenment ==
It is held by European philosophers of the Enlightenment and by historians of the Enlightenment that Newton's publication of the Principia was a turning point in the Scientific Revolution and started the Enlightenment. It was Newton's conception of the universe based upon natural and rationally understandable laws that became one of the seeds for Enlightenment ideology. John Locke and Voltaire applied concepts of natural law to political systems advocating intrinsic rights; the physiocrats and Adam Smith applied natural conceptions of psychology and self-interest to economic systems; and sociologists criticised the current social order for trying to fit history into natural models of progress. James Burnett, Lord Monboddo and Samuel Clarke resisted elements of Newton's work, but eventually rationalised it to conform with their strong religious views of nature.

== Works ==
=== Published in his lifetime ===
- De analysi per aequationes numero terminorum infinitas (1669, published 1711)
- Of Natures Obvious Laws & Processes in Vegetation (unpublished, c. 1671–75)
- De motu corporum in gyrum (1684)
- Philosophiæ Naturalis Principia Mathematica (1687)
- Scala graduum Caloris. Calorum Descriptiones & signa (1701)
- Opticks (1704)
- Reports as Master of the Mint (1701–1725)
- Arithmetica Universalis (1707)

=== Published posthumously ===
- De mundi systemate (The System of the World) (1728)
- Optical Lectures (1728)
- The Chronology of Ancient Kingdoms Amended (1728)
- Observations on Daniel and The Apocalypse of St. John (1733)
- Method of Fluxions (1671, published 1736)
- An Historical Account of Two Notable Corruptions of Scripture (1754)

== See also ==
- Elements of the Philosophy of Newton, a book by Voltaire
- List of multiple discoveries: seventeenth century
- List of presidents of the Royal Society
- List of things named after Isaac Newton

Academic offices
Preceded by Isaac Barrow	Lucasian Professor of Mathematics at the University of Cambridge; 1669–1702	Succeeded by William Whiston
Preceded by The Lord Somers	President of the Royal Society; 1703–1727	Succeeded by Hans Sloane
Parliament of England
Preceded by Robert Brady	Member of Parliament for Cambridge University; 1689–1690; With: Robert Sawyer	Succeeded by Edward Finch
Preceded by Anthony Hammond	Member of Parliament for Cambridge University; 1701–1702; With: The Lord Carleton	Succeeded by The Earl of Anglesey
Government offices
Preceded by Benjamin Overton	Warden of the Mint; 1696–1700	Succeeded by John Stanley
Preceded by Thomas Neale	Master of the Mint; 1700–1727	Succeeded by John Conduitt
