= List of fellows of the Royal Society elected in 1672 =

This is a list of fellows of the Royal Society elected in its 13th year, 1672.

== Fellows ==
- Jean Dominique Cassini (1625–1712)
- Sir Frescheville Holles (1642–1672)
- Henry Howard (1655–1701)
- Sir Isaac Newton (1642–1727)
- John Tillotson (1630–1694)
- Francis Vernon (1637–1677)
- Howard (unknown) (1655–1689)
