= De motu corporum in gyrum =

1684 document by Isaac Newton containing mathematical derivations of Kepler's laws

De motu corporum in gyrum (Note: The title of the document is only presumed because the original is now lost. Its contents are inferred from surviving documents, which are two contemporary copies and a draft. Only the draft has the title now used; both copies are without title.) (from Latin: "On the motion of bodies in an orbit"; abbreviated De Motu (Note: not to be confused with several other Newtonian papers carrying titles that start with these words)) is the presumed title of a manuscript by Isaac Newton sent to Edmond Halley in November 1684. The manuscript was prompted by a visit from Halley earlier that year when he had questioned Newton about problems then occupying the minds of Halley and his scientific circle in London, including Sir Christopher Wren and Robert Hooke.

This manuscript gave important mathematical derivations relating to the three relations now known as "Kepler's laws of planetary motion" (before Newton's work, these had not been generally regarded as scientific laws). Halley reported the communication from Newton to the Royal Society on 10 December 1684 (Old Style). After further encouragement from Halley, Newton developed the ideas outlined by De Motu into his book Philosophiæ Naturalis Principia Mathematica.

== Contents ==
Diagram illustrating centripetal force

One of the surviving copies of De Motu was made by being entered in the Royal Society's register book, and its (Latin) text is available online.

For ease of cross-reference to the contents of De Motu that appeared again in the Principia, there are online sources for the Principia in English translation, as well as in Latin.

De motu corporum in gyrum is short enough to set out here the contents of its different sections. It contains 11 propositions, labelled as 'theorems' and 'problems', some with corollaries. Before reaching this core subject-matter, Newton begins with some preliminaries:

- 3 Definitions:

1: 'Centripetal force' (Newton originated this term, and its first occurrence is in this document) impels or attracts a body to some point regarded as a center. (This reappears in Definition 5 of the Principia.)
2: 'Inherent force' of a body is defined in a way that prepares for the idea of inertia and of Newton's first law (in the absence of external force, a body continues in its state of motion either at rest or in uniform motion along a straight line). (Definition 3 of the Principia is to similar effect.)
3: 'Resistance': the property of a medium that regularly impedes motion.

- 4 Hypotheses:

1: Newton indicates that in the first 9 propositions below, resistance is assumed nil, then for the remaining (2) propositions, resistance is assumed proportional both to the speed of the body and to the density of the medium.
2: By its intrinsic force (alone) every body would progress uniformly in a straight line to infinity unless something external hinders that.

(Newton's later first law of motion is to similar effect, Law 1 in the Principia.)

3: Forces combine by a parallelogram rule. Newton treats them in effect as we now treat vectors. This point reappears in Corollaries 1 and 2 to the third law of motion, Law 3 in the Principia.
4: In the initial moments of effect of a centripetal force, the distance is proportional to the square of the time. (The context indicates that Newton was dealing here with infinitesimals or their limiting ratios.) This reappears in Book 1, Lemma 10 in the Principia.

Then follow two more preliminary points:

- 2 Lemmas:

1: Newton briefly sets out continued products of proportions involving differences:
if A/(A–B) = B/(B–C) = C/(C–D) etc., then A/B = B/C = C/D etc.
2: All parallelograms touching a given ellipse (to be understood: at the endpoints of conjugate diameters) are equal in area.

Then follows Newton's main subject-matter, labelled as theorems, problems, corollaries and scholia:

=== Theorem 1 ===
Theorem 1 demonstrates that where an orbiting body is subject only to a centripetal force, it follows that a radius vector, drawn from the body to the attracting center, sweeps out equal areas in equal times (no matter how the centripetal force varies with distance). (Newton uses for this derivation – as he does in later proofs in this De Motu, as well as in many parts of the later Principia – a limit argument of infinitesimal calculus in geometric form, in which the area swept out by the radius vector is divided into triangle-sectors. They are of small and decreasing size considered to tend towards zero individually, while their number increases without limit.) This theorem appears again, with expanded explanation, as Proposition 1, Theorem 1, of the Principia.

=== Theorem 2 ===
Theorem 2 considers a body moving uniformly in a circular orbit, and shows that for any given time-segment, the centripetal force (directed towards the center of the circle, treated here as a center of attraction) is proportional to the square of the arc-length traversed, and inversely proportional to the radius. (This subject reappears as Proposition 4, Theorem 4 in the Principia, and the corollaries here reappear also.)

Corollary 1 then points out that the centripetal force is proportional to V^{2}/R, where V is the orbital speed and R the circular radius.

Corollary 2 shows that, putting this in another way, the centripetal force is proportional to (1/P^{2}) * R where P is the orbital period.

Corollary 3 shows that if P^{2} is proportional to R, then the centripetal force would be independent of R.

Corollary 4 shows that if P^{2} is proportional to R^{2}, then the centripetal force would be proportional to 1/R.

Corollary 5 shows that if P^{2} is proportional to R^{3}, then the centripetal force would be proportional to 1/(R^{2}).

A scholium then points out that the Corollary 5 relation (square of orbital period proportional to cube of orbital size) is observed to apply to the planets in their orbits around the Sun, and to the Galilean satellites orbiting Jupiter.

=== Theorem 3 ===
Theorem 3 now evaluates the centripetal force in a non-circular orbit, using another geometrical limit argument, involving ratios of vanishingly small line-segments. The demonstration comes down to evaluating the curvature of the orbit as if it were made of infinitesimal arcs, and the centripetal force at any point is evaluated from the speed and the curvature of the local infinitesimal arc. This subject reappears in the Principia as Proposition 6 of Book 1.

A corollary then points out how it is possible in this way to determine the centripetal force for any given shape of orbit and center.

Problem 1 then explores the case of a circular orbit, assuming the center of attraction is on the circumference of the circle. A scholium points out that if the orbiting body were to reach such a center, it would then depart along the tangent. (Proposition 7 in the Principia.)

Problem 2 explores the case of an ellipse, where the center of attraction is at its center, and finds that the centripetal force to produce motion in that configuration would be directly proportional to the radius vector. (This material becomes Proposition 10, Problem 5 in the Principia.)

Problem 3 again explores the ellipse, but now treats the further case where the center of attraction is at one of its foci. "A body orbits in an ellipse: there is required the law of centripetal force tending to a focus of the ellipse." Here Newton finds the centripetal force to produce motion in this configuration would be inversely proportional to the square of the radius vector. (Translation: 'Therefore, the centripetal force is reciprocally as L X SP², that is, (reciprocally) in the doubled ratio [i.e., square] of the distance ... .') This becomes Proposition 11 in the Principia.

A scholium then points out that this Problem 3 proves that the planetary orbits are ellipses with the Sun at one focus. (Translation: 'The major planets orbit, therefore, in ellipses having a focus at the center of the Sun, and with their radii (vectores) drawn to the Sun describe areas proportional to the times, altogether (Latin: 'omnino') as Kepler supposed.') (This conclusion is reached after taking as initial fact the observed proportionality between square of orbital period and cube of orbital size, considered in corollary 5 to Theorem 1.) (A controversy over the cogency of the conclusion is described below.) The subject of Problem 3 becomes Proposition 11, Problem 6, in the Principia.

=== Theorem 4 ===
Theorem 4 shows that with a centripetal force inversely proportional to the square of the radius vector, the time of revolution of a body in an elliptical orbit with a given major axis is the same as it would be for the body in a circular orbit with the same diameter as that major axis. (Proposition 15 in the Principia.)

A scholium points out how this enables determining the planetary ellipses and the locations of their foci by indirect measurements.

Problem 4 then explores, for the case of an inverse-square law of centripetal force, how to determine the orbital ellipse for a given starting position, speed, and direction of the orbiting body. Newton points out here, that if the speed is high enough, the orbit is no longer an ellipse, but is instead a parabola or hyperbola. He also identifies a geometrical criterion for distinguishing between the elliptical case and the others, based on the calculated size of the latus rectum, as a proportion to the distance the orbiting body at closest approach to the center. (Proposition 17 in the Principia.)

A scholium then remarks that a bonus of this demonstration is that it allows definition of the orbits of comets and enables an estimation of their periods and returns where the orbits are elliptical. Some practical difficulties of implementing this are also discussed.

Finally in the series of propositions based on zero resistance from any medium, Problem 5 discusses the case of a degenerate elliptical orbit, amounting to a straight-line fall towards or ejection from the attracting center. (Proposition 32 in the Principia.)

A scholium points out how problems 4 and 5 would apply to projectiles in the atmosphere and to the fall of heavy bodies, if the atmospheric resistance could be assumed nil.

Lastly, Newton attempts to extend the results to the case where there is atmospheric resistance, considering first (Problem 6) the effects of resistance on inertial motion in a straight line, and then (Problem 7) the combined effects of resistance and a uniform centripetal force on motion towards/away from the center in a homogeneous medium. Both problems are addressed geometrically using hyperbolic constructions. These last two 'Problems' reappear in Book 2 of the Principia as Propositions 2 and 3.

Then a final scholium points out how problems 6 and 7 apply to the horizontal and vertical components of the motion of projectiles in the atmosphere (in this case neglecting earth curvature).

== Commentaries on the contents ==
At some points in 'De Motu', Newton depends on matters proved being used in practice as a basis for regarding their converses as also proved. This has been seen as especially so in regard to 'Problem 3'. Newton's style of demonstration in all his writings was rather brief in places; he appeared to assume that certain steps would be found self-evident or obvious. In 'De Motu', as in the first edition of the Principia, Newton did not specifically state a basis for extending the proofs to the converse. The proof of the converse here depends on its being apparent that there is a unique relation, i.e., that in any given setup, only one orbit corresponds to one given and specified set of force/velocity/starting position. Newton added a mention of this kind into the second edition of the Principia, as a Corollary to Propositions 11–13, in response to criticism of this sort made during his lifetime.

A significant scholarly controversy has existed over the question whether and how far these extensions to the converse, and the associated uniqueness statements, are self-evident and obvious or not. (There is no suggestion that the converses are not true, or that they were not stated by Newton, the argument has been over whether Newton's proofs were satisfactory or not.)

== Halley's question ==
The details of Edmund Halley's visit to Newton in 1684 are known to us only from reminiscences of thirty to forty years later. According to one of these reminiscences, Halley asked Newton, "what he thought the Curve would be that would be described by the Planets supposing the force of attraction towards the Sun to be reciprocal to the square of their distance from it."

Another version of the question was given by Newton himself, but also about thirty years after the event: he wrote that Halley, asking him "if I knew what figure the Planets described in their Orbs about the Sun was very desirous to have my Demonstration" In light of these differing reports, both produced from old memories, it is hard to know exactly what words Halley used.

== Role of Robert Hooke ==
Newton acknowledged in 1686 that an initial stimulus on him in 1679/80 to extend his investigations of the movements of heavenly bodies had arisen from correspondence with Robert Hooke in 1679/80.

Hooke had started an exchange of correspondence in November 1679 by writing to Newton, to tell Newton that Hooke had been appointed to manage the Royal Society's correspondence. Hooke therefore wanted to hear from members about their researches, or their views about the researches of others; and as if to whet Newton's interest, he asked what Newton thought about various matters, and then gave a whole list, mentioning "compounding the celestial motions of the planetts of a direct motion by the tangent and an attractive motion towards the central body", and "my hypothesis of the lawes or causes of springinesse", and then a new hypothesis from Paris about planetary motions (which Hooke described at length), and then efforts to carry out or improve national surveys, the difference of latitude between London and Cambridge, and other items. Newton replied with "a fansy of my own" about determining the Earth's motion, using a falling body. Hooke disagreed with Newton's idea of how the falling body would move, and a short correspondence developed.

Later, in 1686, when Newton's Principia had been presented to the Royal Society, Hooke claimed from this correspondence the credit for some of Newton's content in the Principia, and said Newton owed the idea of an inverse-square law of attraction to him – although at the same time, Hooke disclaimed any credit for the curves and trajectories that Newton had demonstrated on the basis of the inverse square law.

Newton, who heard of this from Halley, rebutted Hooke's claim in letters to Halley, acknowledging only an occasion of reawakened interest. Newton did acknowledge some prior work of others, including the French priest and astronomer Ismaël Bullialdus, who suggested (but without demonstration) that there was an attractive force from the Sun in the inverse square proportion to the distance, and Giovanni Alfonso Borelli, who suggested (again without demonstration) that there was a tendency towards the Sun like gravity or magnetism that would make the planets move in ellipses; but that the elements Hooke claimed were due either to Newton himself, or to other predecessors of them both such as Bullialdus and Borelli, but not Hooke. Wren and Halley were both skeptical of Hooke's claims, recalling an occasion when Hooke had claimed to have a derivation of planetary motions under an inverse square law, but had failed to produce it even under the incentive of a prize.

There has been scholarly controversy over exactly what if anything Newton really gained from Hooke, apart from the stimulus that Newton acknowledged.

About thirty years after Newton's death in 1727, Alexis Clairaut, one of Newton's early and eminent successors in the field of gravitational studies, wrote after reviewing Hooke's work that it showed "what a distance there is between a truth that is glimpsed and a truth that is demonstrated".

== See also ==
- Galileo, Descartes, and Christiaan Huygens
- Classical mechanics

== Bibliography ==
- Never at rest: a biography of Isaac Newton, by R. S. Westfall, Cambridge University Press, 1980 ISBN 0-521-23143-4
- The Mathematical Papers of Isaac Newton, Vol. 6, pp. 30–91, ed. by D. T. Whiteside, Cambridge University Press, 1974 ISBN 0-521-08719-8
