= Index of Christianity-related articles =

Christianity is an Abrahamic monotheistic religion based on the life and teachings of Jesus (often referred to as Jesus Christ) as interpreted in the Bible. It is the largest religion in the world, with 2.4 billion people, known as Christians, that adhere to the religion.

The following are articles on Wikipedia related to Christianity:

== 0–9 ==
- 1 Esdras
- 1 Maccabees
- 17th-century denominations in England
- 2 Baruch
- 2 Esdras
- 2 Maccabees
- 3 Maccabees
- 4 Baruch
- 4 Maccabees

== A ==
- Abaddon
- Abbess
- Abbot
- Abdul Rahman Al Ghafiqi
- Abortion and Christianity
- Achaichus
- Action of Churches Together in Scotland
- Acts of the Apostles
- Additions to Daniel
- Adoration of the shepherds
- Advent
- Adventism
- Aeneas (biblical figure)
- Affinity (Christian organisation)
- African Methodist Episcopal Church
- African Methodist Episcopal Zion Church
- Agabus
- Agnus Dei
- Alexander (Ephesian)
- Alexander of Constantinople
- All Africa Conference of Churches
- Alliance of Baptists
- Alphaeus
- Alypius of Byzantium
- American-Canadian Macedonian Orthodox Diocese
- American Baptist Association
- American Baptist Churches USA
- Amish
- Anabaptism
- Ananias and Sapphira
- Ananias of Damascus
- Ananias son of Nedebaios
- Andrew the Apostle
- Andronicus of Pannonia
- Angel
- Anglican Church in North America
- Anglican Church of Australia
- Anglican Church of Canada
- Anglican Communion
- Anglicanism
- Anna the Prophetess
- Annas
- Anointing of Jesus
- Anselm of Canterbury
- Ante-Nicene Period
- Anti-Christian policies in the Roman Empire
- Antilegomena
- Antiochian Orthodox Archdiocese of Australia, New Zealand, and All Oceania
- Antiochian Orthodox Christian Archdiocese of North America
- Antipas of Pergamum
- Antonius Felix
- Antony I of Constantinople
- Antony II of Constantinople
- Apocalyptic literature
- Apollos
- Apostles
- Apostolic Age
- Apostolic Church of Pentecost
- Apostolic Fathers
- Archbishop
- Archbishop Atticus of Constantinople
- Archbishop Flavian of Constantinople
- Archbishop Maximianus of Constantinople
- Archbishop Maximus I of Constantinople
- Archbishop Nectarius of Constantinople
- Archbishop Sisinnius I of Constantinople
- Archdiocese of Thyateira and Great Britain
- Archippus
- Aretas IV Philopatris
- Arian controversy
- Arianism
- Aristarchus of Thessalonica
- Armenian Apostolic Church
- Arminianism
- Arrest of Jesus
- Arsacius of Tarsus
- Arsenios Autoreianos
- Ascension of Jesus
- Asia Pacific Baptist Federation
- Assemblies of God
- Assemblies of God in the United Kingdom
- Associated Presbyterian Churches
- Association of Baptist Churches in Ireland
- Association of Regular Baptist Churches
- Association of Vineyard Churches
- Assyrian Church of the East
- Athanasius of Alexandria
- Athenodorus of Byzantium
- Atonement in Christianity
- Augustine of Hippo
- Australian Christian Churches
- Australian Union Conference of Seventh-day Adventists
- Authorship of the Bible
- Avignon Papacy
- Azusa Street Revival

== B ==
- Baptism
- Baptism of Jesus
- Baptism of Poland
- Baptist
- Baptist Bible Fellowship International
- Baptist General Conference
- Baptist General Conference of Canada
- Baptist Missionary Association of America
- Baptist Union of Australia
- Baptist Union of Great Britain
- Baptist Union of Scotland
- Baptist Union of Wales
- Baptist World Alliance
- Baptists
- Barabbas
- Barnabas
- Bartholomew
- Bartholomew the Apostle
- Bartimaeus (Biblical character)
- Beatification
- Bel and the Dragon
- Bernard of Clairvaux
- Bible
- Bible chronology
- Bible prophecy
- Bible Student movement
- Bible translations into English
- Biblical apocrypha
- Biblical canon
- Biblical law in Christianity
- Biblical Magi
- Biblical manuscript
- Biblical studies
- Bishop
- Blastus
- Blind man of Bethsaida
- Bonaventure
- Book of Amos
- Book of Baruch
- Book of Common Prayer
- Book of Concord
- Book of Daniel
- Book of Deuteronomy
- Book of Enoch
- Book of Esther
- Book of Exodus
- Book of Ezekiel
- Book of Ezra
- Book of Genesis
- Book of Habakkuk
- Book of Haggai
- Book of Hosea
- Book of Isaiah
- Book of Jeremiah
- Book of Job
- Book of Joel
- Book of Jonah
- Book of Joshua
- Book of Judges
- Book of Judith
- Book of Lamentations
- Book of Leviticus
- Book of Malachi
- Book of Micah
- Book of Mormon
- Book of Nahum
- Book of Nehemiah
- Book of Numbers
- Book of Obadiah
- Book of Odes (Bible)
- Book of Proverbs
- Book of Revelation
- Book of Ruth
- Book of Tobit
- Book of Wisdom
- Book of Zechariah
- Book of Zephaniah
- Books of Chronicles
- Books of Kings
- Books of Samuel
- Books of the Bible
- Brethren in Christ Church
- Britain Yearly Meeting
- British Methodist Episcopal Church
- British New Church Movement
- British Orthodox Church
- Buddhism and Christianity
- Burial of Jesus
- Byzantine–Ottoman Wars
- Byzantine Empire
- Byzantine Iconoclasm
- Byzantium

== C ==
- Caiaphas
- Calendar of saints
- Calendar of saints (Anglican Church of Australia)
- Calendar of saints (Anglican Church of Canada)
- Calendar of saints (Anglican Church of Korea)
- Calendar of saints (Anglican Church of Southern Africa)
- Calendar of saints (Armenian Apostolic Church)
- Calendar of saints (Church of England)
- Calendar of saints (Episcopal Church)
- Calendar of saints (Hong Kong Sheng Kung Hui)
- Calendar of saints (Lutheran)
- Calendar of saints (Scottish Episcopal Church)
- Calvinism
- Camp meeting
- Canadian and American Reformed Churches
- Canadian Baptist Ministries
- Canadian Conference of Mennonite Brethren Churches
- Canadian Convention of Southern Baptists
- Canadian Council of Churches
- Canadian Yearly Meeting
- Canon (priest)
- Canonization
- Cardinal (Catholic Church)
- Castinus of Byzantium
- Categories of New Testament manuscripts
- Catholic Church
- Catholic Church by country
- Catholic Church in Australia
- Catholic Church in Canada
- Catholic Church in England and Wales
- Catholic Church in Ireland
- Catholic Church in Scotland
- Catholic Church in the United Kingdom
- Catholic Church in the United States
- Catholic Mariavite Church
- Catholicism
- Catholicos
- Celtic Christianity
- Celtic Orthodox Church
- Chaplain
- Chapters and verses of the Bible
- Charismatic Movement
- Charles de Steuben
- Charles Martel
- Christ (title)
- Christadelphians
- Christendom
- Christian and Missionary Alliance
- Christian apologetics
- Christian art
- Christian Church
- Christian Church (Disciples of Christ)
- Christian churches and churches of Christ
- Christian City Churches
- Christian Conference of Asia
- Christian denomination
- Christian Holiness Partnership
- Christian liturgy
- Christian martyrs
- Christian Methodist Episcopal Church
- Christian mission
- Christian monasticism
- Christian music
- Christian Outreach Centre
- Christian pacifism
- Christian prayer
- Christian Reformed Church in North America
- Christian Reformed Churches of Australia
- Christian revival
- Christian right
- Christian school
- Christian symbolism
- Christian theology
- Christian tradition
- Christian views on alcohol
- Christian views on astrology
- Christian views on cloning
- Christian views on contraception
- Christian views on marriage
- Christian views on sin
- Christian Zionism
- Christianity
- Christianity among the Mongols
- Christianity and antisemitism
- Christianity and divorce
- Christianity and domestic violence
- Christianity and environmentalism
- Christianity and Freemasonry
- Christianity and Hinduism
- Christianity and homosexuality
- Christianity and Islam
- Christianity and Judaism
- Christianity and multiculturalism
- Christianity and Neoplatonism
- Christianity and other religions
- Christianity and Paganism
- Christianity and politics
- Christianity and slavery
- Christianity by country
- Christianity in Abkhazia
- Christianity in Afghanistan
- Christianity in Africa
- Christianity in Albania
- Christianity in Algeria
- Christianity in Angola
- Christianity in Argentina
- Christianity in Armenia
- Christianity in Asia
- Christianity in Australia
- Christianity in Azerbaijan
- Christianity in Bahrain
- Christianity in Bangladesh
- Christianity in Belarus
- Christianity in Benin
- Christianity in Bhutan
- Christianity in Botswana
- Christianity in Brunei
- Christianity in Burkina Faso
- Christianity in Burma
- Christianity in Burundi
- Christianity in Cambodia
- Christianity in Canada
- Christianity in Cape Verde
- Christianity in China
- Christianity in Colombia
- Christianity in Comoros
- Christianity in Cuba
- Christianity in Cyprus
- Christianity in Denmark
- Christianity in Djibouti
- Christianity in East Timor
- Christianity in Eastern Arabia
- Christianity in Egypt
- Christianity in England
- Christianity in Eritrea
- Christianity in Ethiopia
- Christianity in Europe
- Christianity in France
- Christianity in Georgia (country)
- Christianity in Germany
- Christianity in Ghana
- Christianity in Guinea-Bissau
- Christianity in Haiti
- Christianity in Hong Kong
- Christianity in India
- Christianity in Indonesia
- Christianity in Iran
- Christianity in Iraq
- Christianity in Ireland
- Christianity in Israel
- Christianity in Italy
- Christianity in Jamaica
- Christianity in Japan
- Christianity in Jordan
- Christianity in Kazakhstan
- Christianity in Korea
- Christianity in Kosovo
- Christianity in Kuwait
- Christianity in Kyrgyzstan
- Christianity in Laos
- Christianity in Lebanon
- Christianity in Libya
- Christianity in Lithuania
- Christianity in Macau
- Christianity in Malaysia
- Christianity in Malta
- Christianity in Mauritania
- Christianity in Mauritius
- Christianity in Mongolia
- Christianity in Montenegro
- Christianity in Morocco
- Christianity in Nepal
- Christianity in New Zealand
- Christianity in Niger
- Christianity in Nigeria
- Christianity in North Korea
- Christianity in North Macedonia
- Christianity in Norway
- Christianity in Oman
- Christianity in Pakistan
- Christianity in Palestine
- Christianity in Panama
- Christianity in Poland
- Christianity in Portugal
- Christianity in Qatar
- Christianity in Russia
- Christianity in Samoa
- Christianity in Saudi Arabia
- Christianity in Scotland
- Christianity in Serbia
- Christianity in Singapore
- Christianity in Somalia
- Christianity in Somaliland
- Christianity in South Korea
- Christianity in Sri Lanka
- Christianity in Sudan
- Christianity in Switzerland
- Christianity in Syria
- Christianity in Taiwan
- Christianity in Tajikistan
- Christianity in Tanzania
- Christianity in Thailand
- Christianity in the 10th century
- Christianity in the 11th century
- Christianity in the 12th century
- Christianity in the 13th century
- Christianity in the 14th century
- Christianity in the 15th century
- Christianity in the 16th century
- Christianity in the 17th century
- Christianity in the 18th century
- Christianity in the 19th century
- Christianity in the 1st century
- Christianity in the 20th century
- Christianity in the 21st century
- Christianity in the 2nd century
- Christianity in the 3rd century
- Christianity in the 4th century
- Christianity in the 5th century
- Christianity in the 6th century
- Christianity in the 7th century
- Christianity in the 8th century
- Christianity in the 9th century
- Christianity in the Democratic Republic of the Congo
- Christianity in the Gambia
- Christianity in the Maldives
- Christianity in the Middle East
- Christianity in the Philippines
- Christianity in the United Arab Emirates
- Christianity in the United Kingdom
- Christianity in the United States
- Christianity in Tokelau
- Christianity in Tunisia
- Christianity in Turkey
- Christianity in Turkmenistan
- Christianity in Ukraine
- Christianity in Uzbekistan
- Christianity in Vatican City
- Christianity in Vietnam
- Christianity in Wales
- Christianity in Western Sahara
- Christianity in Yemen
- Christianity in Zambia
- Christianity in Zimbabwe
- Christianization of Bulgaria
- Christianization of Hungary
- Christianization of Iceland
- Christianization of Kievan Rus'
- Christianization of Lithuania
- Christianization of Pomerania
- Christianization of Scandinavia
- Christians
- Christmas
- Christmastide
- Christodoulos (Greek Orthodox patriarch of Alexandria)
- Christology
- Chronological list of saints and blesseds
- Chronological list of saints and blesseds in the 11th century
- Chronological list of saints and blesseds in the 12th century
- Chronological list of saints and blesseds in the 13th century
- Chronological list of saints and blesseds in the 14th century
- Chronological list of saints and blesseds in the 15th century
- Chronological list of saints and blesseds in the 16th century
- Chronological list of saints and blesseds in the 17th century
- Chronological list of saints and blesseds in the 18th century
- Chronological list of saints and blesseds in the 19th century
- Chronological list of saints and blesseds in the 20th century
- Chronological list of saints in the 10th century
- Chronological list of saints in the 1st century
- Chronological list of saints in the 2nd century
- Chronological list of saints in the 3rd century
- Chronological list of saints in the 4th century
- Chronological list of saints in the 5th century
- Chronological list of saints in the 6th century
- Chronological list of saints in the 7th century
- Chronological list of saints in the 8th century
- Chronological list of saints in the 9th century
- Chronology of Jesus
- Church Fathers
- Church in Wales
- Church of Christ (Latter Day Saints)
- Church of Christ, Scientist
- Church of England
- Church of God (Anderson, Indiana)
- Church of God (Cleveland, Tennessee)
- Church of God in Christ
- Church of God of Prophecy
- Church of Ireland
- Church of Scotland
- Church of the Brethren
- Church of the East
- Church of the Nazarene
- Church on the Rock International
- Church usher
- Churches of Christ
- Churches of Christ in Australia
- Churches Together in Britain and Ireland
- Churches Together in England
- Churches Uniting in Christ
- Churchwarden
- Circuit rider (religious)
- Claudius Lysias
- Cleansing of the Temple
- Cleopas
- Clopas
- Commissioning of the Twelve Apostles
- Communion of saints
- Community of Christ
- Conciliarism
- Conference of European Churches
- Confessional Evangelical Lutheran Conference
- Confessor of the Faith
- Congregation for the Causes of Saints
- Congregational church
- Congregational Federation
- Conrad Grebel
- Conservative Baptist Association of America
- Conservative Congregational Christian Conference
- Constantine I
- Constantine Leichoudes
- Constantine the Great
- Constantinople
- Continuing Anglican movement
- Coptic calendar
- Coptic history
- Coptic Orthodox Church in Australia
- Coptic Orthodox Church in Canada
- Coptic Orthodox Church of Alexandria
- Coptic versions of the Bible
- Cornelius the Centurion
- Council of Chalcedon
- Council of Ephesus
- Council of Jerusalem
- Council of Trent
- Counter-Reformation
- CRC Churches International
- Creed
- Crescens
- Criticism of Christianity
- Crown of thorns
- Crucifixion of Jesus
- Crusades
- Cumberland Presbyterian Church
- Curate
- Cursing the fig tree
- Cyriacus I of Byzantium
- Cyril Lucaris
- Cyril of Alexandria
- Cyrus of Alexandria
- Cytûn

== D ==
- Daughter of Jairus
- Deacon
- Deaconesses
- Dead Sea Scrolls
- Dean (Christianity)
- Demetrius (biblical figure)
- Demophilus of Constantinople
- Dependent territory
- Desert Fathers
- Desiderius Erasmus
- Deuterocanonical books
- Development of the Christian biblical canon
- Development of the New Testament canon
- Development of the Old Testament canon
- Devil in Christianity
- Diatessaron
- Diet of Worms
- Diogenes of Byzantium
- Dionysius the Areopagite
- Diotrephes
- Disciple (Christianity)
- Disciple whom Jesus loved
- Dissolution of the Monasteries
- Doctors of the Church
- Dometius of Byzantium
- Dorcas
- Drusilla (daughter of Herod Agrippa)

== E ==
- Early Christianity
- East–West Schism
- Easter
- Easter Triduum
- Eastern Catholic Churches
- Eastern Christianity
- Eastern Orthodox Church
- Eastern Orthodox Church organization
- Eastern Orthodox liturgical calendar
- Eastern Orthodoxy in Greece
- Ecclesiastes
- Ecumenical council
- Ecumenical Patriarch Bartholomew I of Constantinople
- Ecumenical Patriarch Callinicus III of Constantinople
- Ecumenical Patriarch Clement of Constantinople
- Ecumenical Patriarch Demetrios I of Constantinople
- Ecumenical Patriarch Dionysius IV of Constantinople
- Ecumenical Patriarch Methodius III of Constantinople
- Ecumenical Patriarch of Constantinople
- Ecumenical Patriarch Serapheim II of Constantinople
- Ecumenism
- Église réformée du Québec
- Elder (Christianity)
- Eleutherius of Byzantium
- Elim Pentecostal Church
- Elizabeth (biblical figure)
- Elizabethan Religious Settlement
- Elymas
- Emerging church
- Empire of Nicaea
- Empty tomb
- English Civil War
- English Reformation
- Epaphras
- Epaphroditus
- Episcopal Church (United States)
- Epistle
- Epistle of James
- Epistle of Jude
- Epistle to Philemon
- Epistle to the Colossians
- Epistle to the Ephesians
- Epistle to the Galatians
- Epistle to the Hebrews
- Epistle to the Philippians
- Epistle to the Romans
- Epistle to Titus
- Erastus of Corinth
- Ethiopian eunuch
- Ethiopian Orthodox Tewahedo Church
- Eucharistic theology
- Eudoxius of Antioch
- Eulogius of Alexandria
- Euodia and Syntyche
- European Baptist Federation
- European wars of religion
- Eusebius of Nicomedia
- Eustratius Garidas
- Eutychus
- Euzois of Byzantium
- Evagrius of Constantinople
- Evangelical Alliance
- Evangelical Christian Church in Canada
- Evangelical Covenant Church
- Evangelical Free Church of America
- Evangelical Free Church of Canada
- Evangelical Friends Church International
- Evangelical Lutheran Church in America
- Evangelical Lutheran Church in Canada
- Evangelical Lutheran Church of England
- Evangelical Movement of Wales
- Evangelical Presbyterian Church (United States)
- Evangelical Presbyterian Church in England and Wales
- Evangelicalism
- Evangelism
- Exarch

== F ==
- Faith in Christianity
- Felix of Byzantium
- Fellowship of Congregational Churches
- Fellowship of Evangelical Baptist Churches in Canada
- Fellowship of Grace Brethren Churches
- Fellowship of Independent Evangelical Churches
- First Council of Constantinople
- First Council of Nicaea
- First Epistle of John
- First Epistle of Peter
- First Epistle to the Corinthians
- First Epistle to the Thessalonians
- First Epistle to Timothy
- First Great Awakening
- First seven Ecumenical Councils
- First Vatican Council
- Five solae
- Flagellation of Christ
- Four Evangelists
- Four Horsemen of the Apocalypse
- Fourth Council of the Lateran
- Fourth Great Awakening
- Foxe's Book of Martyrs
- Francis of Assisi
- Francis Xavier
- Free Church of England
- Free Church of Scotland (Continuing)
- Free Church of Scotland (since 1900)
- Free Methodist
- Free Methodist Church
- Free Methodist Church in Canada
- Free Presbyterian Church of Scotland
- Free Presbyterian Church of Ulster
- Friar
- Friends General Conference
- Friends United Meeting
- Friends World Committee for Consultation

== G ==
- Gabriel
- Gamaliel
- Genealogies in the Bible
- General Association of Regular Baptist Churches
- General Council of the Assemblies of God in the United States of America
- General epistles
- General Roman Calendar
- General Roman Calendar of 1954
- General Roman Calendar of 1960
- General Roman Calendar of 1969
- General Roman Calendar of Pope Pius XII
- General Superintendent (Church of the Nazarene)
- Gennadius of Constantinople
- Gennadius Scholarius
- Germanic Christianity
- Gnosticism and the New Testament
- God-fearer
- God in Christianity
- God the Father
- God the Son
- Good Friday
- Gospel
- Gospel harmony
- Gospel of John
- Gospel of Luke
- Gospel of Mark
- Gospel of Matthew
- Gothic Christianity
- Great Commission
- Greek Orthodox Archdiocese of America
- Greek Orthodox Archdiocese of Australia
- Gregory of Nazianzus

== H ==
- Hagiography
- Henry VIII of England
- Herod Agrippa
- Herod Agrippa II
- Herod Antipas
- Herod Archelaus
- Herod the Great
- Herodian dynasty
- Herodians
- Herodias
- Historical background of the New Testament
- Historical development of the doctrine of papal primacy
- Historical Jesus
- Historicity of the Bible
- History of Arab Christians
- History of Calvinism
- History of Christian theology
- History of Christianity
- History of Christianity during the Middle Ages
- History of Christianity in Romania
- History of Christianity in Scotland
- History of Christianity in the United States
- History of Christianity in Ukraine
- History of early Christianity
- History of Eastern Christianity
- History of Jehovah's Witnesses
- History of late ancient Christianity
- History of modern Christianity
- History of Oriental Orthodoxy
- History of Protestantism
- History of the Anglican Communion
- History of the Calvinist–Arminian debate
- History of the Catholic Church
- History of the Church of England
- History of the Eastern Orthodox Church under the Ottoman Empire
- History of the Latter Day Saint movement
- History of the Eastern Orthodox Church
- History of the papacy
- History of the Puritans
- History of the Quakers
- History of the Russian Orthodox Church
- History of the Seventh-day Adventist Church
- Holiness movement
- Holy Chalice
- Holy Saturday
- Holy Spirit
- Holy Spirit in Christianity
- Hutterite
- Hymenaeus (biblical figure)

== I ==
- Ichthus Christian Fellowship
- Iglesia ni Cristo
- Ignatius of Antioch
- Impenitent thief
- Independent Catholic churches
- Independent Fundamental Churches of America
- Inquisition
- Intercession of saints
- International Church of the Foursquare Gospel
- International Churches of Christ
- International Conference of Reformed Churches
- International Council of Community Churches
- International Lutheran Council
- International Pentecostal Holiness Church
- Investiture Controversy
- Ireland Yearly Meeting
- Irenaeus

== J ==
- James, brother of Jesus
- James, son of Alphaeus
- James, son of Zebedee
- Jan Hus
- Jansenism
- Jason of Tarsus
- Jehovah's Witnesses
- Jerome
- Jesuits
- Jesus
- Jesus in Christianity
- Jesus Justus
- Jesus movement
- Joachim
- Joanna, wife of Chuza
- Johannine epistles
- John Calvin
- John Chrysostom
- John Knox
- John Mark
- John of Cappadocia
- John of Patmos
- John Scholasticus
- John Smyth (Baptist minister)
- John the Apostle
- John the Baptist
- John the Evangelist
- John the Merciful
- John VI of Constantinople
- John Wycliffe
- John X of Constantinople
- Joseph Barsabbas
- Joseph of Arimathea
- Joses
- Jubilees
- Judas Barsabbas
- Judas Iscariot
- Judas of Galilee
- Judas the Zealot
- Jude the Apostle
- Jude, brother of Jesus
- Junia
- Junius Annaeus Gallio
- Justin Martyr

== K ==
- Kingship and kingdom of God
- Korean Presbyterian Church in America
- Kyros of Constantinople

== L ==
- Last Supper
- Latter Day Saint movement
- Laurence of Byzantium
- Lazarus of Bethany
- Legion (demons)
- Letter of Jeremiah
- Liberation Theology
- Life of Jesus in the New Testament
- List of Abunas of Ethiopia
- List of Anglican Church calendars
- List of Anglicans
- List of Armenian Patriarchs of Constantinople
- List of artifacts significant to the Bible
- List of Assemblies of God people
- List of Australian Presbyterians
- List of Baptists
- List of bishops and patriarchs of Aquileia
- List of burial places of biblical figures
- List of Catholicoi of Armenia
- List of Catholicos of the East
- List of Christian denominations
- List of Christian martyrs
- List of Christian movements
- List of Church Fathers
- List of Coptic Catholic Patriarchs of Alexandria
- List of Coptic Orthodox Popes of Alexandria
- List of current patriarchs
- List of early Christian saints
- List of early Christian writers
- List of Eastern Orthodox Christians
- List of Ecumenical Patriarchs of Constantinople
- List of English Bible translations
- List of evangelical Christians
- List of Greek Orthodox Patriarchs of Alexandria
- List of Greek Orthodox Patriarchs of Antioch
- List of Irish Presbyterians
- List of Latter Day Saints
- List of Lutheran clergy
- List of Lutheran denominations
- List of Maronite Patriarchs
- List of Melkite Greek Catholic Patriarchs of Antioch
- List of members of the Assyrian Church of the East
- List of Mennonites
- List of Methodists
- List of metropolitans and patriarchs of Moscow
- List of patriarchs of Alexandria
- List of patriarchs of Antioch
- List of patriarchs of the Bulgarian Orthodox Church
- List of patriarchs of the Church of the East
- List of popes
- List of Presbyterian denominations in Australia
- List of Protestant Reformers
- List of Puritans
- List of Reformed denominations
- List of saints
- List of Seventh-day Adventists
- List of Syriac Orthodox Patriarchs of Antioch
- Lists of Christians
- Lists of Roman Catholics
- Liturgical year
- Lucius of Cyrene
- Luke Chrysoberges
- Luke the Evangelist
- Lutheran Church–Canada
- Lutheran Church–Missouri Synod
- Lutheran Church in Great Britain
- Lutheran Church of Australia
- Lutheran orthodoxy
- Lutheran World Federation
- Lutheranism
- Lydia of Thyatira
- Lysanias

== M ==
- Macedonius I of Constantinople
- Mainline Protestant
- Major prophet
- Malankara Orthodox Syrian Church
- Malchus
- Manahen
- Marcionism
- Marcus I of Byzantium
- Mariavite Church
- Mark the Evangelist
- Martha
- Martin Luther
- Martyr
- Martyrs' Synod
- Mary Magdalene
- Mary of Bethany
- Mary of Clopas
- Mary of Rome
- Mary, mother of James
- Mary, mother of Jesus
- Mary, mother of John Mark
- Masoretic Text
- Matthew the Apostle
- Matthew the Evangelist
- Menno Simons
- Mennonite
- Mennonite Church Canada
- Mennonite Church USA
- Mennonite World Conference
- Meqabyan
- Messiah
- Messianic Jewish Alliance of America
- Methodios I of Constantinople
- Methodism
- Methodist Church in Ireland
- Methodist Church of Great Britain
- Metrophanes of Byzantium
- Michael (archangel)
- Michael I Cerularius
- Middle Ages
- Middle East Council of Churches
- Millerism
- Minister (Christianity)
- Ministry of Jesus
- Minor prophet
- Miracles of Jesus
- Missionary
- Modernism in the Catholic Church
- Monk
- Monotheism
- Montanism
- Moravian Church
- Mormonism and Christianity
- Muratorian fragment
- Myrrhbearers

== N ==
- National Association of Congregational Christian Churches
- National Association of Evangelicals
- National Association of Free Will Baptists
- National Baptist Convention of America, Inc.
- National Baptist Convention, USA, Inc.
- National Council of Churches
- National Council of Churches in Australia
- National Missionary Baptist Convention of America
- National Primitive Baptist Convention of the U.S.A.
- Nativity of Jesus
- Neoplatonism Christian
- Neo-Lutheranism
- Nestorianism
- Nestorius
- New Covenant
- New Testament
- Newfrontiers
- Nicene Creed
- Nicholas Mystikos
- Nicholas the Deacon
- Nicodemus
- Nicodemus ben Gurion
- Nikephoros I of Constantinople
- Ninety-five Theses
- Non-canonical books referenced in the Bible
- Non-subscribing Presbyterian Church of Ireland
- Nondenominational Christianity
- Nontrinitarianism
- North American Baptist Conference
- North American Presbyterian and Reformed Council
- Nymphas

== O ==
- Old Baptist Union
- Old Catholic Church
- Old Lutherans
- Old Testament
- Olympianus of Byzantium
- Oneness Pentecostalism
- Onesimus
- Open Brethren
- Oriental Orthodoxy
- Origen
- Origen of Alexandria
- Orthodox Church in America
- Orthodox Tewahedo biblical canon
- Ottoman Empire
- Our Lady of Guadalupe
- Outline of Christian theology
- Outline of religion
- Outline of spirituality

== P ==
- Pacific Conference of Churches
- Palm Sunday
- Parables of Jesus
- Paraclete
- Passion bearer
- Passion of Jesus
- Passover (Christian holiday)
- Pastor
- Pastoral epistles
- Patriarch
- Patriarch Acacius of Constantinople
- Patriarch Alexander II of Alexandria
- Patriarch Alexius of Constantinople
- Patriarch Anastasius of Constantinople
- Patriarch Anatolius of Constantinople
- Patriarch Anthimus I of Constantinople
- Patriarch Anthimus II of Constantinople
- Patriarch Anthimus IV of Constantinople
- Patriarch Anthimus V of Constantinople
- Patriarch Anthimus VI of Constantinople
- Patriarch Anthimus VII of Constantinople
- Patriarch Antony III of Constantinople
- Patriarch Antony IV of Constantinople
- Patriarch Apollinarius of Alexandria
- Patriarch Arsenius of Alexandria
- Patriarch Artemius of Alexandria
- Patriarch Athanasius I of Constantinople
- Patriarch Athanasius III of Alexandria
- Patriarch Athanasius IV of Alexandria
- Patriarch Athenagoras I of Constantinople
- Patriarch Basil I of Constantinople
- Patriarch Basil II of Constantinople
- Patriarch Basil III of Constantinople
- Patriarch Benjamin I of Constantinople
- Patriarch Callinicus I of Constantinople
- Patriarch Callinicus IV of Constantinople
- Patriarch Callinicus of Alexandria
- Patriarch Callistus I of Constantinople
- Patriarch Christopher I of Alexandria
- Patriarch Christopher II of Alexandria
- Patriarch Constantine I of Constantinople
- Patriarch Constantine II of Constantinople
- Patriarch Constantine V of Constantinople
- Patriarch Constantine VI of Constantinople
- Patriarch Cosmas I of Alexandria
- Patriarch Cosmas I of Constantinople
- Patriarch Cosmas II of Constantinople
- Patriarch Cosmas III of Alexandria
- Patriarch Cosmas III of Constantinople
- Patriarch Cyprian of Alexandria
- Patriarch Cyriacus II of Constantinople
- Patriarch Cyril II of Alexandria
- Patriarch Cyril III of Constantinople
- Patriarch Cyril V of Constantinople
- Patriarch Cyril VII of Constantinople
- Patriarch Dionysius I of Constantinople
- Patriarch Dionysius II of Constantinople
- Patriarch Dionysius V of Constantinople
- Patriarch Eleutherius of Alexandria
- Patriarch Elias I of Alexandria
- Patriarch Elias II of Alexandria
- Patriarch Epiphanius of Constantinople
- Patriarch Eugenius II of Constantinople
- Patriarch Euphemius of Constantinople
- Patriarch Eustathius of Constantinople
- Patriarch Eustatius of Alexandria
- Patriarch Euthymius I of Constantinople
- Patriarch Eutychius of Alexandria
- Patriarch Eutychius of Constantinople
- Patriarch Fravitta of Constantinople
- Patriarch Gabriel II of Constantinople
- Patriarch Gabriel III of Constantinople
- Patriarch George I of Alexandria
- Patriarch George I of Constantinople
- Patriarch George II of Alexandria
- Patriarch George II of Constantinople
- Patriarch Gerasimus I of Alexandria
- Patriarch Gerasimus I of Constantinople
- Patriarch Gerasimus II of Alexandria
- Patriarch Gerasimus III of Alexandria
- Patriarch Germanus I of Constantinople
- Patriarch Germanus II of Constantinople
- Patriarch Germanus IV of Constantinople
- Patriarch Germanus V of Constantinople
- Patriarch Gregory I of Alexandria
- Patriarch Gregory II of Alexandria
- Patriarch Gregory II of Constantinople
- Patriarch Gregory III of Alexandria
- Patriarch Gregory III of Constantinople
- Patriarch Gregory IV of Alexandria
- Patriarch Gregory IV of Constantinople
- Patriarch Gregory V of Alexandria
- Patriarch Gregory V of Constantinople
- Patriarch Gregory VII of Constantinople
- Patriarch Hierotheus I of Alexandria
- Patriarch Hierotheus II of Alexandria
- Patriarch Ignatius of Constantinople
- Patriarch Isaac of Alexandria
- Patriarch Isaias of Constantinople
- Patriarch Isidore I of Constantinople
- Patriarch Isidore II of Constantinople
- Patriarch Jacob of Alexandria
- Patriarch Jeremias I of Constantinople
- Patriarch Jeremias II of Constantinople
- Patriarch Jeremias III of Constantinople
- Patriarch Joachim I of Constantinople
- Patriarch Joachim II of Constantinople
- Patriarch Joachim III of Constantinople
- Patriarch Joachim IV of Constantinople
- Patriarch Joachim of Alexandria
- Patriarch Joannicius I of Constantinople
- Patriarch Joannicius II of Constantinople
- Patriarch Joannicius III of Constantinople
- Patriarch Joannicius of Alexandria
- Patriarch Joasaph I of Constantinople
- Patriarch Joasaph II of Constantinople
- Patriarch Job of Alexandria
- Patriarch John I of Alexandria
- Patriarch John IV of Alexandria
- Patriarch John IV of Constantinople
- Patriarch John IX of Constantinople
- Patriarch John V of Constantinople
- Patriarch John VI of Alexandria
- Patriarch John VII of Constantinople
- Patriarch John VIII of Constantinople
- Patriarch John XI of Constantinople
- Patriarch John XII of Constantinople
- Patriarch John XIII of Constantinople
- Patriarch John XIV of Constantinople
- Patriarch Joseph II of Constantinople
- Patriarch Leo of Constantinople
- Patriarch Leontius of Alexandria
- Patriarch Macedonius II of Constantinople
- Patriarch Manuel I of Constantinople
- Patriarch Manuel II of Constantinople
- Patriarch Mark II of Constantinople
- Patriarch Mark III of Alexandria
- Patriarch Mark IV of Alexandria
- Patriarch Mark V of Alexandria
- Patriarch Mark VI of Alexandria
- Patriarch Matthew II of Constantinople
- Patriarch Matthew of Alexandria
- Patriarch Maximus II of Constantinople
- Patriarch Maximus III of Constantinople
- Patriarch Maximus IV of Constantinople
- Patriarch Maximus V of Constantinople
- Patriarch Meletius I Pegas
- Patriarch Meletius III of Constantinople
- Patriarch Meletius IV of Constantinople
- Patriarch Menas of Constantinople
- Patriarch Metrophanes II of Constantinople
- Patriarch Metrophanes III of Constantinople
- Patriarch Metrophanes of Alexandria
- Patriarch Michael I of Alexandria
- Patriarch Michael II of Alexandria
- Patriarch Michael II of Constantinople
- Patriarch Michael IV of Constantinople
- Patriarch Neophytus V of Constantinople
- Patriarch Neophytus VI of Constantinople
- Patriarch Neophytus VIII of Constantinople
- Patriarch Nephon I of Constantinople
- Patriarch Nephon II of Constantinople
- Patriarch Nicanor of Alexandria
- Patriarch Nicephorus of Alexandria
- Patriarch Nicetas I of Constantinople
- Patriarch Nicholas I of Alexandria
- Patriarch Nicholas II of Alexandria
- Patriarch Nicholas II of Constantinople
- Patriarch Nicholas III of Alexandria
- Patriarch Nicholas III of Constantinople
- Patriarch Nicholas IV of Alexandria
- Patriarch Nicholas IV of Constantinople
- Patriarch Nicholas V of Alexandria
- Patriarch Nicholas VI of Alexandria
- Patriarch Nilus of Constantinople
- Patriarch Niphon of Alexandria
- Patriarch of Alexandria
- Patriarch Pachomius I of Constantinople
- Patriarch Pachomius II of Constantinople
- Patriarch Paisius II of Constantinople
- Patriarch Paisius of Alexandria
- Patriarch Parthenius I of Alexandria
- Patriarch Parthenius II of Alexandria
- Patriarch Parthenius III of Alexandria
- Patriarch Parthenius III of Constantinople
- Patriarch Paul II of Constantinople
- Patriarch Paul III of Constantinople
- Patriarch Paul IV of Constantinople
- Patriarch Paul of Alexandria
- Patriarch Peter IV of Alexandria
- Patriarch Peter of Constantinople
- Patriarch Peter V of Alexandria
- Patriarch Peter VI of Alexandria
- Patriarch Peter VII of Alexandria
- Patriarch Photios II of Constantinople
- Patriarch Photius of Alexandria
- Patriarch Politianus of Alexandria
- Patriarch Polyeuctus of Constantinople
- Patriarch Pyrrhus of Constantinople
- Patriarch Raphael I of Constantinople
- Patriarch Raphael II of Constantinople
- Patriarch Sabbas of Alexandria
- Patriarch Samuel of Alexandria
- Patriarch Sergius II of Constantinople
- Patriarch Silvester of Alexandria
- Patriarch Sisinnius II of Constantinople
- Patriarch Sophronius I of Alexandria
- Patriarch Sophronius I of Constantinople
- Patriarch Sophronius II of Alexandria
- Patriarch Sophronius III of Alexandria
- Patriarch Sophronius III of Constantinople
- Patriarch Stephen II of Constantinople
- Patriarch Symeon I of Constantinople
- Patriarch Tarasios of Constantinople
- Patriarch Theodore I of Alexandria
- Patriarch Theodore I of Constantinople
- Patriarch Theodore II of Alexandria
- Patriarch Theodosius I of Constantinople
- Patriarch Theoleptus I of Constantinople
- Patriarch Theoleptus II of Constantinople
- Patriarch Theophilus III of Alexandria
- Patriarch Theophilus II of Alexandria
- Patriarch Theophylact of Constantinople
- Patriarch Thomas I of Constantinople
- Patriarch Thomas II of Constantinople
- Patriarch Timothy I of Constantinople
- Patriarch Timothy II of Constantinople
- Patriarch Timothy III of Alexandria
- Patriarch Tryphon of Constantinople
- Patriarch Zoilus of Alexandria
- Patristics
- Patron saint
- Paul I of Constantinople
- Paul the Apostle
- Pauline epistles
- Pelagianism
- Penitent thief
- Pentateuch
- Pentecostal Assemblies of Canada
- Pentecostal Assemblies of the World
- Pentecostal Church of God
- Pentecostal World Conference
- Pentecostalism
- Pertinax of Byzantium
- Peshitta
- Peter Abelard
- Pharisees
- Philadelphus of Byzantium
- Philetus (biblical figure)
- Philip the Apostle
- Philip the Evangelist
- Philip the Tetrarch
- Philipp Melanchthon
- Philotheos (Coptic patriarch of Alexandria)
- Philotheos (Greek patriarch of Alexandria)
- Philotheus I of Constantinople
- Phoebe (biblical figure)
- Photios I of Constantinople
- Pietism
- Pietist
- Pilate's court
- Plutarch of Byzantium
- Plymouth Brethren
- Polish National Catholic Church
- Polycarpus I of Byzantium
- Polycarpus II of Byzantium
- Pontius Pilate
- Pontius Pilate's wife
- Pope
- Pope Abraham of Alexandria
- Pope Achillas of Alexandria
- Pope Adeodatus I
- Pope Adeodatus II
- Pope Adrian I
- Pope Adrian II
- Pope Adrian III
- Pope Adrian IV
- Pope Adrian V
- Pope Adrian VI
- Pope Agapetus I
- Pope Agapetus II
- Pope Agatho
- Pope Agatho of Alexandria
- Pope Agrippinus of Alexandria
- Pope Alexander I
- Pope Alexander I of Alexandria
- Pope Alexander II
- Pope Alexander II of Alexandria
- Pope Alexander III
- Pope Alexander IV
- Pope Alexander VI
- Pope Alexander VII
- Pope Alexander VIII
- Pope Anacletus
- Pope Anastasius I
- Pope Anastasius II
- Pope Anastasius III
- Pope Anastasius IV
- Pope Anastasius of Alexandria
- Pope Andronicus of Alexandria
- Pope Anianus of Alexandria
- Pope Anicetus
- Pope Anterus
- Pope Athanasius II of Alexandria
- Pope Athanasius III of Alexandria
- Pope Avilius of Alexandria
- Pope Benedict I
- Pope Benedict II
- Pope Benedict III
- Pope Benedict IV
- Pope Benedict IX
- Pope Benedict V
- Pope Benedict VI
- Pope Benedict VII
- Pope Benedict VIII
- Pope Benedict XI
- Pope Benedict XII
- Pope Benedict XIII
- Pope Benedict XIV
- Pope Benedict XV
- Pope Benedict XVI
- Pope Benjamin I of Alexandria
- Pope Benjamin II of Alexandria
- Pope Boniface I
- Pope Boniface II
- Pope Boniface III
- Pope Boniface IV
- Pope Boniface IX
- Pope Boniface V
- Pope Boniface VI
- Pope Boniface VIII
- Pope Caius
- Pope Callixtus I
- Pope Callixtus II
- Pope Callixtus III
- Pope Celadion of Alexandria
- Pope Celestine I
- Pope Celestine II
- Pope Celestine III
- Pope Celestine IV
- Pope Celestine V
- Pope Christodolos of Alexandria
- Pope Clement I
- Pope Clement II
- Pope Clement III
- Pope Clement IV
- Pope Clement IX
- Pope Clement V
- Pope Clement VI
- Pope Clement VII
- Pope Clement VIII
- Pope Clement X
- Pope Clement XI
- Pope Clement XII
- Pope Clement XIII
- Pope Clement XIV
- Pope Conon
- Pope Constantine
- Pope Cornelius
- Pope Cosmas I of Alexandria
- Pope Cosmas II of Alexandria
- Pope Cosmas III of Alexandria
- Pope Cyril II of Alexandria
- Pope Cyril III of Alexandria
- Pope Cyril IV of Alexandria
- Pope Cyril V of Alexandria
- Pope Cyril VI of Alexandria
- Pope Damasus I
- Pope Damasus II
- Pope Damian of Alexandria
- Pope Demetrius I of Alexandria
- Pope Demetrius II of Alexandria
- Pope Dionysius
- Pope Dionysius of Alexandria
- Pope Dioscorus I of Alexandria
- Pope Dioscorus II of Alexandria
- Pope Donus
- Pope Eleuterus
- Pope Eugene I
- Pope Eugene II
- Pope Eugene III
- Pope Eugene IV
- Pope Eumenes of Alexandria
- Pope Eusebius
- Pope Eutychian
- Pope Evaristus
- Pope Fabian
- Pope Felix I
- Pope Felix III
- Pope Felix IV
- Pope Formosus
- Pope Gabriel I of Alexandria
- Pope Gabriel II of Alexandria
- Pope Gabriel III of Alexandria
- Pope Gabriel IV of Alexandria
- Pope Gabriel V of Alexandria
- Pope Gabriel VI of Alexandria
- Pope Gabriel VII of Alexandria
- Pope Gabriel VIII of Alexandria
- Pope Gelasius I
- Pope Gelasius II
- Pope Gregory I
- Pope Gregory II
- Pope Gregory III
- Pope Gregory IV
- Pope Gregory IX
- Pope Gregory V
- Pope Gregory VI
- Pope Gregory VII
- Pope Gregory VIII
- Pope Gregory X
- Pope Gregory XI
- Pope Gregory XII
- Pope Gregory XIII
- Pope Gregory XIV
- Pope Gregory XV
- Pope Gregory XVI
- Pope Heraclas of Alexandria
- Pope Hilarius
- Pope Honorius I
- Pope Honorius II
- Pope Honorius III
- Pope Honorius IV
- Pope Hormisdas
- Pope Hyginus
- Pope Innocent I
- Pope Innocent II
- Pope Innocent III
- Pope Innocent IV
- Pope Innocent IX
- Pope Innocent V
- Pope Innocent VI
- Pope Innocent VII
- Pope Innocent VIII
- Pope Innocent X
- Pope Innocent XI
- Pope Innocent XII
- Pope Innocent XIII
- Pope Isaac of Alexandria
- Pope Jacob of Alexandria
- Pope John I
- Pope John I (II) of Alexandria
- Pope John II
- Pope John II (III) of Alexandria
- Pope John III
- Pope John III of Alexandria
- Pope John IV
- Pope John IV of Alexandria
- Pope John IX
- Pope John IX of Alexandria
- Pope John Paul I
- Pope John Paul II
- Pope John V
- Pope John V of Alexandria
- Pope John VI
- Pope John VI of Alexandria
- Pope John VII
- Pope John VII of Alexandria
- Pope John VIII
- Pope John VIII of Alexandria
- Pope John X
- Pope John X of Alexandria
- Pope John XI
- Pope John XI of Alexandria
- Pope John XII
- Pope John XII of Alexandria
- Pope John XIII
- Pope John XIII of Alexandria
- Pope John XIV
- Pope John XIV of Alexandria
- Pope John XIX
- Pope John XIX of Alexandria
- Pope John XV
- Pope John XV of Alexandria
- Pope John XVI of Alexandria
- Pope John XVII
- Pope John XVII of Alexandria
- Pope John XVIII
- Pope John XVIII of Alexandria
- Pope John XXI
- Pope John XXII
- Pope John XXIII
- Pope Joseph I of Alexandria
- Pope Joseph II of Alexandria
- Pope Julian of Alexandria
- Pope Julius I
- Pope Julius II
- Pope Julius III
- Pope Justus of Alexandria
- Pope Kedron of Alexandria
- Pope Lando
- Pope Leo I
- Pope Leo II
- Pope Leo III
- Pope Leo IV
- Pope Leo IX
- Pope Leo V
- Pope Leo VI
- Pope Leo VII
- Pope Leo VIII
- Pope Leo X
- Pope Leo XI
- Pope Leo XII
- Pope Leo XIII
- Pope Liberius
- Pope Linus
- Pope Lucius I
- Pope Lucius II
- Pope Lucius III
- Pope Macarius I of Alexandria
- Pope Macarius II of Alexandria
- Pope Macarius III of Alexandria
- Pope Marcellinus
- Pope Marcellus I
- Pope Marcellus II
- Pope Marinus I
- Pope Marinus II
- Pope Mark
- Pope Mark II of Alexandria
- Pope Mark III of Alexandria
- Pope Mark IV of Alexandria
- Pope Mark V of Alexandria
- Pope Mark VI of Alexandria
- Pope Mark VII of Alexandria
- Pope Mark VIII of Alexandria
- Pope Markianos of Alexandria
- Pope Martin I
- Pope Martin IV
- Pope Martin V
- Pope Matthew I of Alexandria
- Pope Matthew II of Alexandria
- Pope Matthew III of Alexandria
- Pope Matthew IV of Alexandria
- Pope Maximus of Alexandria
- Pope Michael I of Alexandria
- Pope Michael II of Alexandria
- Pope Michael III of Alexandria
- Pope Michael IV of Alexandria
- Pope Michael V of Alexandria
- Pope Michael VI of Alexandria
- Pope Miltiades
- Pope Mina I of Alexandria
- Pope Mina II of Alexandria
- Pope Nicholas I
- Pope Nicholas II
- Pope Nicholas III
- Pope Nicholas IV
- Pope Nicholas V
- Pope Paschal I
- Pope Paschal II
- Pope Paul I
- Pope Paul II
- Pope Paul III
- Pope Paul IV
- Pope Paul V
- Pope Paul VI
- Pope Pelagius I
- Pope Pelagius II
- Pope Peter I of Alexandria
- Pope Peter II of Alexandria
- Pope Peter III of Alexandria
- Pope Peter IV of Alexandria
- Pope Peter V of Alexandria
- Pope Peter VI of Alexandria
- Pope Peter VII of Alexandria
- Pope Pius I
- Pope Pius II
- Pope Pius III
- Pope Pius IV
- Pope Pius IX
- Pope Pius V
- Pope Pius VI
- Pope Pius VII
- Pope Pius VIII
- Pope Pius X
- Pope Pius XI
- Pope Pius XII
- Pope Pontian
- Pope Primus of Alexandria
- Pope Romanus
- Pope Sabinian
- Pope Sergius I
- Pope Sergius II
- Pope Sergius III
- Pope Sergius IV
- Pope Severinus
- Pope Shenouda I of Alexandria
- Pope Shenouda II of Alexandria
- Pope Shenouda III of Alexandria
- Pope Silverius
- Pope Simeon I of Alexandria
- Pope Simeon II of Alexandria
- Pope Simplicius
- Pope Siricius
- Pope Sisinnius
- Pope Sixtus I
- Pope Sixtus II
- Pope Sixtus III
- Pope Sixtus IV
- Pope Sixtus V
- Pope Soter
- Pope Stephen I
- Pope Stephen II
- Pope Stephen III
- Pope Stephen IV
- Pope Stephen IX
- Pope Stephen V
- Pope Stephen VI
- Pope Stephen VII
- Pope Stephen VIII
- Pope Sylvester I
- Pope Sylvester II
- Pope Sylvester III
- Pope Symmachus
- Pope Telesphorus
- Pope Theodore I
- Pope Theodore II
- Pope Theodosius I of Alexandria
- Pope Theodosius II of Alexandria
- Pope Theodosius III of Alexandria
- Pope Theonas of Alexandria
- Pope Theophilus II of Alexandria
- Pope Theophilus of Alexandria
- Pope Timothy I of Alexandria
- Pope Timothy II of Alexandria
- Pope Timothy III of Alexandria
- Pope Urban I
- Pope Urban II
- Pope Urban III
- Pope Urban IV
- Pope Urban V
- Pope Urban VI
- Pope Urban VII
- Pope Urban VIII
- Pope Valentine
- Pope Victor I
- Pope Victor II
- Pope Victor III
- Pope Vigilius
- Pope Vitalian
- Pope Zacharias of Alexandria
- Pope Zachary
- Pope Zephyrinus
- Pope Zosimus
- Porcius Festus
- Post-resurrection appearances of Jesus
- Prayer of Manasseh
- Preacher
- Presbyter
- Presbyterian Church (USA)
- Presbyterian Church in America
- Presbyterian Church in Canada
- Presbyterian Church in Ireland
- Presbyterian Church of Australia
- Presbyterian Church of Wales
- Presbyterianism
- Priest
- Primate (bishop)
- Priscilla and Aquila
- Proclus of Constantinople
- Progressive National Baptist Convention
- Proselyte
- Proterius of Alexandria
- Protestantism
- Protestantism and Islam
- Protestantism by country
- Protocanonical books
- Psalm 151
- Psalms
- Puritans

== Q ==
- Quakers
- Quirinius

== R ==
- Radical Reformation
- Raising of the son of the widow of Nain
- Raphael
- Rector (ecclesiastical)
- Reformation
- Reformation in Switzerland
- Reformed Church in America
- Reformed Ecumenical Council
- Reformed Presbyterian churches
- Rejection of Jesus
- Relations between Eastern Orthodoxy and Judaism
- Religion in Albania
- Religion in Antigua and Barbuda
- Religion in Austria
- Religion in Azerbaijan
- Religion in Belgium
- Religion in Bosnia and Herzegovina
- Religion in Brazil
- Religion in Bulgaria
- Religion in Cameroon
- Religion in Canada
- Religion in Cape Verde
- Religion in Chad
- Religion in Chile
- Religion in Costa Rica
- Religion in Côte d'Ivoire
- Religion in Cyprus
- Religion in Denmark
- Religion in East Timor
- Religion in Ecuador
- Religion in El Salvador
- Religion in Eritrea
- Religion in Fiji
- Religion in Finland
- Religion in Gabon
- Religion in Germany
- Religion in Greece
- Religion in Guinea-Bissau
- Religion in Guyana
- Religion in Iceland
- Religion in Jersey
- Religion in Kenya
- Religion in Kiribati
- Religion in Lesotho
- Religion in Liberia
- Religion in Lithuania
- Religion in Luxembourg
- Religion in Mali
- Religion in Mexico
- Religion in Moldova
- Religion in Mozambique
- Religion in Namibia
- Religion in Nauru
- Religion in Nicaragua
- Religion in Niger
- Religion in North Korea
- Religion in North Macedonia
- Religion in Palau
- Religion in Papua New Guinea
- Religion in Paraguay
- Religion in Peru
- Religion in Poland
- Religion in Portugal
- Religion in Romania
- Religion in Samoa
- Religion in Serbia
- Religion in Tanzania
- Religion in the Dominican Republic
- Religion in the Federated States of Micronesia
- Religion in the Maldives
- Religion in the Marshall Islands
- Religion in the Netherlands
- Religion in the United Kingdom
- Religion in Tonga
- Religion in Tuvalu
- Religion in Vanuatu
- Restoration Movement
- Resurrection of Jesus
- Reverend
- Revival Centres International
- Rhoda (biblical figure)
- Roman citizenship
- Russian Orthodox Church Outside Russia
- Russian Orthodox Diocese of Sourozh

== S ==
- Sacramental union
- Sadducees
- Saint
- Saint Dominic
- Saint Joseph
- Saint Longinus
- Saint Matthias
- Saint Peter
- Saint Philemon
- Saint Publius
- Saint Stephen
- Saint symbolism
- Saint Timothy
- Saint Titus
- Salome
- Salome (disciple)
- Salvation
- Salvation Army
- Samaritan Pentateuch
- Samaritan woman at the well
- Samaritans
- Sanctuary of Sorrow
- Sanhedrin
- Sanhedrin Trial of Jesus
- Sceva
- Scholasticism
- Schwarzenau Brethren
- Scottish Episcopal Church
- Scottish Reformation
- Second Coming
- Second Epistle of John
- Second Epistle of Peter
- Second Epistle to the Corinthians
- Second Epistle to the Thessalonians
- Second Epistle to Timothy
- Second Great Awakening
- Second Vatican Council
- Sedecion of Byzantium
- Septuagint
- Serbian Orthodox Church
- Sergius I of Constantinople
- Sergius Paulus
- Sermon
- Sermon on the Mount
- Servant of God
- Seven Deacons
- Seventh-day Adventist Church
- Seventy disciples
- Sexton (office)
- Silas
- Silvanus of the Seventy
- Simeon (Gospel of Luke)
- Simeon Niger
- Simon Magus
- Simon of Cyrene
- Simon the Leper
- Simon the Zealot
- Simon, brother of Jesus
- Sirach
- Society of Jesus
- Sofer
- Son of God
- Son of God (Christianity)
- Song of Songs
- Sopater.
- Southern Baptist Convention
- Split of early Christianity and Judaism
- Stachys the Apostle
- Standing Conference of Orthodox Bishops in America
- Standing Conference of the Canonical Orthodox Bishops in the Americas
- Stephen I of Constantinople
- Superintendent (ecclesiastical)
- Susanna (Book of Daniel)
- Susanna (disciple)
- Swiss Brethren
- Synod of Dort
- Synod of Hippo
- Synoptic Gospels
- Syriac Christianity
- Syriac Orthodox Church
- Syriac versions of the Bible

== T ==
- Targum
- Temptation of Christ
- Teresa of Ávila
- Tertius of Iconium
- Tertullian
- Textual criticism
- The Beast (Revelation)
- The Brethren Church
- The Church of Jesus Christ of Latter-day Saints
- The Church of Jesus Christ of Latter-day Saints in Australia
- The Church of Jesus Christ of Latter-day Saints in Canada
- The gospel
- The Prayer of Azariah and Song of the Three Holy Children
- The Venerable
- Theo. I of Constantinople
- Theology of Huldrych Zwingli
- Theophilus (biblical)
- Theudas.
- Third Epistle of John
- Third Great Awakening
- Thirty-nine Articles
- Thomas Aquinas
- Thomas Cranmer
- Thomas More
- Thomas Müntzer was a radical German preacher and theologian in the early 16th century, known for his role in the German Peasants' War and his opposition to both the Catholic Church and Martin Luther.
- Thomas the Apostle
- Three Angels' Messages
- Tiberius
- Timeline of Christian missions
- Timeline of Christianity
- Timeline of Eastern Orthodoxy in America
- Timeline of the Catholic Church
- Timeline of the English Reformation
- Transfiguration of Jesus
- Tridentine calendar
- Trinitarianism
- Trinity
- Trophimus was a close companion of the Apostle Paul, mentioned in the New Testament as one of his travel partners and a supporter in spreading the message of Christianity.
- Twelve Apostles
- Two witnesses
- Tychicus

== U ==
- U.S. Conference of Mennonite Brethren Churches
- Ukrainian Orthodox Church of Canada
- Union of Utrecht (Old Catholic)
- Unitarianism
- United Church of Canada
- United Church of Christ
- United Free Church of Scotland
- United Methodist Church
- United Pentecostal Church International
- United Reformed Church
- Uniting Church in Australia

== V ==
- Varghese Payyappilly Palakkappilly
- Veneration
- Verger
- Vestryman
- Latin in its classical form
- Vexillum
- Vicar
- Virgin birth of Jesus

== W ==
- Wesleyan Church
- Wesleyan Holiness Church
- Wesleyan Methodist Church of Australia
- Wesleyan Reform Union
- Wesleyanism
- Western Christianity
- Western Schism
- Westminster Assembly
- Whore of Babylon
- Wisconsin Evangelical Lutheran Synod
- Wisdom literature
- Woman of the Apocalypse
- Women in Christianity
- World Communion of Reformed Churches
- World Convention of Churches of Christ
- World Council of Churches
- World Evangelical Alliance
- World Methodist Council
- World Reformed Fellowship
- Worldwide Church of God

== Y ==
- Young Earth creationism
- Youth ministry

== Z ==
- Zacchaeus
- Zealotry
- Zebedee
- Zechariah (priest)
- Zwinglianism is a branch of Protestant Christianity based on the teachings of Huldrych Zwingli, emphasizing scripture as the sole authority in faith and practice, and rejecting many traditional Catholic rituals.

== See also ==
- Outline of religion
  - Outline of Christianity
- Index of Catholic Church articles
- Index of Eastern Christianity-related articles
- Index of Protestantism-related articles
