= Outline of Christianity =

Abrahamic monotheistic religion

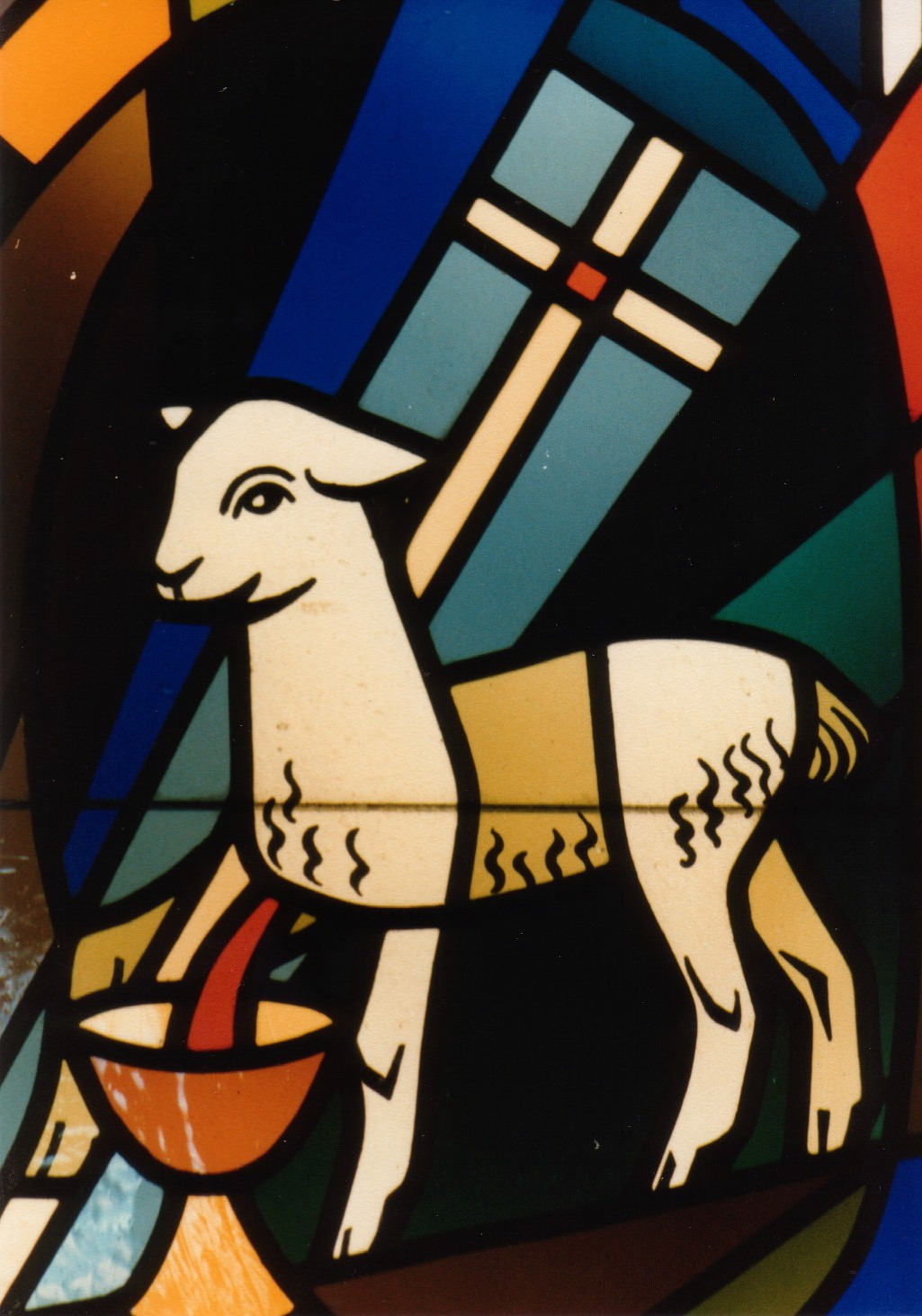
The Lamb of God with a vexillum and chalice in stained glass, a symbol of Christ as the perfect sacrifice

The following outline is provided as an overview of and topical guide to Christianity:

Christianity is a monotheistic religion centered on the life and teachings of Jesus of Nazareth as presented in the New Testament (see Jesus in Christianity). The Christian faith is essentially faith in Jesus as the Christ (or Messiah), the Son of God, the Savior, and, according to Trinitarianism, God the Son, part of the Trinity with God the Father and the Holy Spirit.

== Main article ==
- Christianity

== Branches of Christianity ==
=== Denominational families ===
==== Catholic denominational families ====
- Catholicism – broad term for the body of the Catholic faith, its theologies and doctrines, its liturgical, ethical, spiritual, and behavioral characteristics, as well as a religious people as a whole.

- Catholic Church – also known as the Roman Catholic Church; the world's largest Christian church, with more than 1.3 billion members.
  - Eastern Catholic Churches – autonomous, self-governing (in Latin, sui iuris) particular churches in full communion with the Bishop of Rome, the Pope.
  - Latin Church – Western and largest autonomous Catholic Church
- Independent Catholic Churches – Catholic congregations that are not in communion with Rome or any other churches whose sacraments are recognized by the Roman Catholic Church (such as the Eastern Orthodox and some Oriental Orthodox churches).
- Old Catholic Church – number of Ultrajectine Christian churches that originated with groups that split from the Roman Catholic Church over certain doctrines, most importantly that of papal infallibility.

==== Eastern denominational families ====
- Eastern Christianity – Christian traditions and churches that developed in the Balkans, Eastern Europe, Asia Minor, the Middle East, Horn of Africa, India and parts of the Far East over several centuries of religious antiquity.

- Eastern Orthodox Church – officially called the Orthodox Catholic Church and commonly referred to as the Eastern Orthodox Church is the second largest Christian church in the world, with an estimated 300 million adherents mainly in the countries of Belarus, Bulgaria, Cyprus, Georgia, Greece, Moldova, Montenegro, North Macedonia, Romania, Russia, Serbia, and Ukraine, all of which are majority Eastern Orthodox.
- Eastern Catholic Churches – see section above on "Catholic denominational families".
- Oriental Orthodoxy – faith of those Eastern Christian Churches that recognize only three ecumenical councils—the First Council of Nicaea, the First Council of Constantinople and the First Council of Ephesus.
- Syriac Christianity – Syriac-speaking Christians of Mesopotamia, comprises multiple Christian traditions of Eastern Christianity.

==== Protestant denominational families ====
- Protestantism – one of the major groupings within Christianity, and has been defined as "any Western Christian who is not an adherent of a Catholic, Anglican, or Eastern Church," though many consider Anglicanism to be Protestant as well.

- Anglicanism – the largest Protestant grouping with 85 million adherents in 165 countries. This tradition within Christianity comprises churches with historical connections to the Church of England or similar beliefs, worship and church structures. Most Anglicans today are part of the Anglican Communion. Anglicanism defies itself as 'both catholic and reformed'.

- Continuing Anglican movement – number of Christian churches in various countries that profess Anglicanism while remaining outside the Anglican Communion.

- Adventism – Christian movement which began in the 19th century, in the context of the Second Great Awakening revival in the United States.

- Seventh-day Adventists – largest Adventist movement with Millerite roots. Devoted to propagating the Second Coming (Advent) of Jesus Christ. Established in the 1840s after the Great Disappointment. The church views the Bible as its source of inspiration, mediated by the writings of cofounder Ellen G. White.

- Anabaptist – Protestant Christians of the Radical Reformation of 16th-century Europe, although some consider Anabaptism to be a distinct movement from Protestantism. Anabaptists practice adult baptism as well as a belief in pacifism.

- Mennonites – an ethno-religious group based around the church communities of the Christian Anabaptist denominations named after the Frisian Menno Simons (1496–1561), who, through his writings, articulated and thereby formalized the teachings of earlier Swiss founders.

- Amish – Amish, sometimes referred to as Amish Mennonites, are a group of Christian church fellowships that form a subgroup of the Mennonite churches.

- Hutterite – communal branch of Anabaptists who, like the Amish and Mennonites, trace their roots to the Radical Reformation of the 16th century.

- Schwarzenau Brethren – originating in Germany, the outcome of the Radical Pietist ferment of the late 17th and early 18th century.

- Baptist – Christians who comprise a group of churches that subscribe to a doctrine that baptism should be performed only for professing believers (believer's baptism, as opposed to infant baptism), and that it must be done by immersion (as opposed to affusion or sprinkling).

- Calvinism – Protestant theological system and an approach to the Christian life, named for the 16th-century reformer John Calvin. See the list of Reformed churches.

- Presbyterianism – branch of Protestant Christianity that adheres to the Calvinist theological tradition and whose congregations are organized according to a Presbyterian polity. See the list of Presbyterian denominations in Australia

- Evangelicalism – interdenominational movement within Protestant Christianity that began in the 17th century and became organized with the emergence around 1730 of the Methodists in England and the Pietists among Lutherans in Germany and Scandinavia. See the National Association of Evangelicals.

- Lutheranism – major branch of Protestant Christianity that identifies with the theology of Martin Luther, a German reformer. See the list of Lutheran denominations.

- Methodism – movement of Protestant Christianity represented by a number of denominations, claiming a total of approximately seventy million adherents worldwide. The movement traces its roots to John Wesley's evangelical revival movement.

- Wesleyanism – movement of Protestant Christians who emphasize holiness and seek to follow the methods of the eighteenth-century evangelical reformers, John Wesley and his brother Charles Wesley.

- Holiness movement – set of beliefs and practices emerging from the Methodist Christian church in the mid 19th century. See the Christian Holiness Partnership

- Pentecostalism – renewal movement within Christianity that places special emphasis on a direct personal experience of God through the baptism in the Holy Spirit. See the Pentecostal World Conference.

- Restoration Movement – Christian movement that began on the American frontier during the Second Great Awakening of the early 19th century.

- Christian Church (Disciples of Christ) – mainline Protestant Christian denomination in North America.

- Churches of Christ – autonomous Christian congregations associated with one another, seeking to base doctrine and practice on the Bible alone, and seeking to be New Testament congregations as originally established by the authority of Christ.

- Christian churches and churches of Christ – part of the Restoration Movement and share historical roots with the Christian Church (Disciples of Christ) and the a cappella Churches of Christ.

==== Nontrinitarian denominational families ====
Note that these grouping may not subscribe to the ancient creeds by which Christianity is defined, so might be considered heterodox or non-Christian groups by mainstream Christianity.

- Nontrinitarian – Nontrinitarianism (or antitrinitarianism) refers to monotheistic belief systems, primarily within Christianity, which reject the Christian doctrine of the Trinity, namely, the teaching that God is three distinct hypostases or persons and yet co-eternal, co-equal, and indivisibly united in one essence or ousia.

- Latter Day Saint movement – Latter Day Saint movement (also called the LDS movement) is the collection of independent church groups that trace their origins to a Christian primitivist movement founded by Joseph Smith in 1830. Most members of the movement today are part of the Church of Jesus Christ of Latter-day Saints, but a fraction of Latter Day Saint sects, most notably the Community of Christ, the second largest Latter Day Saint denomination, and those sects that split from the Community of Christ, follow a traditional Protestant trinitarian theology.
- Oneness Pentecostalism – Oneness Pentecostalism (also known as Apostolic Pentecostalism or One God Pentecostalism) refers to a grouping of denominations and believers within Pentecostal Christianity, all of whom subscribe to the nontrinitarian theological doctrine of Oneness.
- Bible Student movement – Bible Student movement is the name adopted by a Restorationist Christian movement that emerged from the teachings and ministry of Charles Taze Russell, also known as Pastor Russell.

=== Lists of individuals by denominational groups ===
- Catholics

- Lists of Roman Catholics

- Eastern Christians

- List of Eastern Orthodox Christians
- List of members of the Assyrian Church of the East

- Nontrinitarians

- List of Latter Day Saints

- Protestants

- List of Protestant Reformers
- List of Anglicans
- List of Assemblies of God people
- List of Baptists
- List of evangelical Christians
- List of Lutheran clergy
- List of Mennonites
- List of Methodists
- List of Australian Presbyterians
- List of Irish Presbyterians
- List of Puritans
- List of Seventh-day Adventists

== Christianity by location ==
- Catholic Church by country
- Eastern Orthodoxy by country
- Oriental Orthodoxy by country
- Protestantism by country
See also

== History of Christianity ==
=== Overview topics in the History of Christianity ===
- History of Christian theology – an overview of various ideas in the development of Christian theology.
- History of late ancient Christianity – traces Christianity during the Christian Roman Empire – the period from the rise of Christianity under Emperor Constantine (c. 313), until the fall of the Roman Empire in the West (c. 476).
- Timeline of Christian missions – chronicles the global expansion of Christianity through a listing of the most important missionary outreach events.
- List of Christian martyrs – Since its earliest days, hundreds of thousands of Christians have been killed for their faith. As such, this list can never be fully complete, and includes only the most notable martyrs.
- Outline of the Catholic ecumenical councils – When problems or issues arise for the Catholic Church, she gathers her bishops to an ecumenical council and together they choose the best course of action. Not all Christian sects agree with all the decisions of all the ecumenical councils.
- Role of the Christian Church in civilization – Christianity has played a prominent role in the shaping of Western civilization.
- Crusading movement – the ideology and institutions that supported Christian warfare

=== History of Christianity by century ===
- Christianity in the 1st century – Jesus, Acts of the Apostles, development of Scripture and liturgy, split with Judaism, Apostolic Fathers, persecution
- Christianity in the 2nd century – Apostolic fathers, early Christian fathers, development of worship, various heresies, spread of Christianity, persecution
- Christianity in the 3rd century – defining Scripture, development of monasticism, ante-Nicene fathers, various heresies, spread of Christianity, persecution
- Christianity in the 4th century – Constantine, council of Nicaea, Nicene and post-Nicene fathers, Scripture, Bishops, controversies, heresies, spread of Christianity, persecutions begin to end
- Christianity in the 5th century – Ecumenical councils, schisms, post-Nicene fathers, pentarchy, Papacy, monasticism, spread of Christianity
- Christianity in the 6th century – Second council of Constantinople, Eastern church develops, Western theology before Charlemagne splinters, Gregory the Great, monasticism, spread of Christianity
- Christianity in the 7th century – Ecumenical councils, tensions between east and west, Western theology, monasticism, spread of Christianity, Byzantine and Muslim conflict
- Christianity in the 8th century – 2nd Nicene council, John of Damascus, spread of Christianity, Christianity and Islam
- Christianity in the 9th century – Carolingian Renaissance, Western theology preserved, spread of Christianity, tensions between east and west
- Christianity in the 10th century – pre-scholastic theology, spread of Christianity, tensions continues towards Great Schism
- Christianity in the 11th century – Great Schism, controversies, monasticism, knighthood, the foundation of the Crusading movement
- Christianity in the 12th century – Crusading movement, Inquisition, universities, scholasticism, monasticism
- Christianity in the 13th century – Religious orders, Crusading movement, 2nd Council of Lyon, Russian Orthodox Church
- Christianity in the 14th century – Inquisition, Crusading movement end, monasticism continues, Western or Papal schism
- Christianity in the 15th century – Eastern Orthodoxy, fall of Constantinople, Western schism continues, Protestant precursors
- Christianity in the 16th century – Protestant Reformation, the Catholic counter-reformation, Eastern Orthodox church
- Christianity in the 17th century – Changing attitudes, trial of Galileo, English Civil War
- Christianity in the 18th century – 1st great awakening, revivalism, America, French Revolution
- Christianity in the 19th century – Modernism, 2nd great awakening, Oxford movement, 1st Vatican Council
- Christianity in the 20th century – Soviet Union, Third Reich, Evangelicalism, Pentecostalism, Fundamentalism, 2nd Vatican Council
- Christianity in the 21st century – Benedix XVI, Catholic-Orthodox dialogue

=== History of Christianity by era ===
==== 33 – 1517 ====
- Lifetime of Jesus
  - Jesus – central figure of Christianity
  - Cultural and historical background of Jesus – 1st century Galilee and Roman Judea, and the traditions of Second Temple Judaism.
  - Chronology of Jesus – gospels do not provide enough details regarding exact dates, yet it is possible to draw from them a general picture of the life story of Jesus.
  - Ministry of Jesus – begins with his baptism in the countryside of Judea, near the river Jordan and ends in Jerusalem, following the Last Supper with his disciples
  - Good News – message of Jesus, the Christ or Messiah—God's ruler promised by the Scriptures—specifically, the coming Kingdom of God, his death on the cross and resurrection to restore people's relationship with God, the descent of the Holy Spirit on believers as the helper, the resulting promise and hope of being saved for any who believe and follow Jesus, and through this, a healing of the brokenness of the entire created universe.
  - Crucifixion of Jesus – an event that occurred during the 1st century AD. Jesus, who Christians believe is the Son of God as well as the Messiah, was arrested, tried, and sentenced by Pontius Pilate to be scourged, and finally executed on a cross.
  - Resurrection of Jesus – Christian religious belief that Jesus Christ returned to bodily life on the Sunday following the Friday on which he was executed by crucifixion.
- Apostolic Age – period of the Twelve Apostles, dating from the Crucifixion of Jesus (c. 30–33) and the Great Commission in Jerusalem until the death of John the Apostle (c. 115) in Anatolia.
  - Holy Spirit – third person of the Holy Trinity—Father, Son, and Holy Spirit, and is Almighty God.
  - Gospels – four gospels came to be accepted as part of the New Testament
  - Acts of the Apostles – outlines the history of the Apostolic Age.
  - Twelve Apostles – Jesus chose 12 disciples and appointed them as apostles or missionaries.
    - Paul the Apostle – perhaps the most influential early Christian missionary.
  - Council of Jerusalem – an Early Christian council that was held in Jerusalem and dated to around the year 50.

===== Ante-Nicene Church, 100 AD – 313 AD =====
History of early Christianity

- Justin Martyr – an early Christian apologist, and is regarded as the foremost interpreter of the theory of the Logos in the 2nd century.
- Ignatius of Antioch – third Bishop of Antioch, and was a student of John the Apostle.
- Persecution of early Christians in the Roman Empire – began during the Ministry of Jesus and continued intermittently over a period of about three centuries until the time of Constantine when Christianity was legalized.
- Church Fathers – early and influential theologians, eminent Christian teachers and great bishops.
- Irenaeus of Lyons – an early church father and apologist, and his writings were formative in the early development of Christian theology.
- Marcionism – an Early Christian dualist belief system that originated in the teachings of Marcion of Sinope at Rome around the year 144; see also Christianity in the 2nd century.
- Development of the New Testament canon – set of books Christians regard as divinely inspired and constituting the New Testament of the Christian Bible.
- Tertullian – prolific early Christian author from Carthage in the Roman province of Africa.
- Montanism – an early Christian movement of the late 2nd century, later referred to by the name of its founder, Montanus, but originally known by its adherents as the New Prophecy.
- Origen of Alexandria – an early Christian Alexandrian scholar and theologian, and one of the most distinguished writers of the early Church.

===== Christian Empire (313 AD – 590 AD) =====
- Constantine – first Roman emperor to convert to Christianity
- Christian monasticism – practice which began to develop early in the history of the Christian Church, modeled upon scriptural examples and ideals, including those in the Old Testament, but not mandated as an institution in the scriptures.
- First seven Ecumenical Councils – first seven Ecumenical Councils, from the First Council of Nicaea (325) to the Second Council of Nicaea (787)
  - First Council of Nicaea – council of Christian bishops convened in Nicaea in Bithynia (present-day İznik in Turkey) by the Roman Emperor Constantine I in AD 325.
- Nicene Creed – creed or profession of faith that is most widely used in Christian liturgy.
- Athanasius of Alexandria – 20th bishop of Alexandria.
- Arian controversy – several controversies between the Christian Church fathers Arius and Athanasius related to Christology which divided the Christian church from before the Council of Nicaea in 325 to after the Council of Constantinople in 381.
- Jerome – Roman Christian priest, confessor, theologian and historian, and who became a Doctor of the Church.
- Augustine of Hippo – was Bishop of Hippo Regius (present-day Annaba, Algeria).
- First Council of Constantinople – first Ecumenical Council held in Constantinople and was called by Theodosius I in 381.
- First Council of Ephesus – third ecumenical council of the early Christian Church, held in 431 at the Church of Mary in Ephesus, Asia Minor.
- Council of Chalcedon – church council held from October 8 to November 1, 451 AD, at Chalcedon (a city of Bithynia in Asia Minor), on the Asian side of the Bosporus.

===== 590 AD – 1517 AD =====
- Middle Ages – period of European history encompassing the 5th to the 15th centuries.
  - Pelagianism – belief that original sin did not taint human nature and that mortal will is still capable of choosing good or evil without special Divine aid.
  - Pope Gregory I – (c. 540 – 12 March 604), better known in English as Gregory the Great, was pope from 3 September 590 until his death.
  - Christendom – In a historical or geopolitical sense the term usually refers collectively to Christian majority countries or countries in which Christianity dominates or nations in which Christianity is the established religion.
  - Celtic Christianity – refers to certain features of Christianity that are held to have been common, across the Celtic-speaking world during the Early Middle Ages.
  - Germanic Christianity – Germanic people underwent gradual Christianization in the course of Late Antiquity and the Early Middle Ages.
  - Christianization of Scandinavia – Christianization of Scandinavia took place between the 8th and the 12th centuries.
  - Investiture Controversy – was a conflict over whether secular authorities such as kings, counts, or dukes, had any legitimate role in appointments to ecclesiastical offices such as bishoprics.
  - Anselm of Canterbury – Benedictine monk, a philosopher, and a prelate of the Church who held the office of Archbishop of Canterbury from 1093 to 1109.
  - Peter Abelard – medieval French scholastic philosopher, theologian and preeminent logician.
  - Bernard of Clairvaux – French abbot and the primary builder of the reforming Cistercian order.
  - Crusading movement – the ideology and institutions that enabled religious warfare blessed by the Pope and the Catholic Church, with the stated goal of restoring Christian access to the holy places in and near Jerusalem.
  - Inquisition – "fight against heretics" by several institutions within the justice system of the Roman Catholic Church.
  - Scholasticism – method of critical thought which dominated teaching by the academics (scholastics, or schoolmen) of medieval universities in Europe from about 1100–1500
  - Dominic –
  - Francis of Assisi – an Italian Catholic friar and preacher. He founded the men's Franciscan Order, the women's Order of St. Clare, and the lay Third Order of Saint Francis.
  - Bonaventure – an Italian medieval scholastic theologian and philosopher.
  - Thomas Aquinas – an Italian Dominican priest of the Roman Catholic Church, and an immensely influential philosopher and theologian in the tradition of scholasticism
  - John Wycliffe – an English Scholastic philosopher, theologian, lay preacher,[1] translator, reformer and university teacher at Oxford in England, who was known as an early dissident in the Roman Catholic Church during the 14th century.
  - Avignon Papacy – period from 1309 to 1376 during which seven popes resided in Avignon, in modern-day France.
  - Western Schism or Papal Schism – split within the Catholic Church from 1378 to 1417. Two men simultaneously claimed to be the true pope.
  - Jan Hus – Czech priest, philosopher, reformer, and master at Charles University in Prague; a key predecessor to the Protestant movement of the sixteenth century.
  - Conciliarism – reform movement in the 14th-, 15th- and 16th-century Roman Catholic Church which held that final authority in spiritual matters resided with the Roman Church as a corporation of Christians, embodied by a general church council, not with the pope.

==== 1517 – present ====
===== The Roman Catholic Church =====
- History of the Roman Catholic Church – Catholic doctrine teaches that the Catholic Church was founded by Jesus Christ at the Confession of Peter.
  - Historical development of the doctrine of Papal Primacy – doctrines of primacy of Simon Peter and primacy of the Roman pontiff are perhaps the most contentiously disputed in the history of Christianity.
  - History of the Papacy – spans from the time of Saint Peter to present day.
  - Timeline of the Roman Catholic Church – As the oldest branch of Christianity, along with Eastern Orthodoxy, the history of the Catholic Church plays an integral part of the History of Christianity as a whole. This article covers a period of just under 2,000 years.
  - Fourth Council of the Lateran – convoked by Pope Innocent III with the papal bull of April 19, 1213, and the Council gathered at Rome's Lateran Palace beginning November 11, 1215.
  - Council of Trent – 16th-century Ecumenical Council of the Roman Catholic Church.
  - Counter-Reformation – period of Catholic revival beginning with the Council of Trent (1545–1563) and ending at the close of the Thirty Years' War, 1648 as a response to the Protestant Reformation.
  - Thomas More – an English lawyer, social philosopher, author, statesman, and noted Renaissance humanist.
  - Pope Leo X – Pope from 1513 to his death in 1521. He was the last non-priest (only a deacon) to be elected Pope.
  - Our Lady of Guadalupe – Virgin of Guadalupe (Virgen de Guadalupe) is a Roman Catholic icon of the Virgin Mary.
  - Jesuits – Christian male religious order that follows the teachings of the Catholic Church.
  - Francis Xavier – pioneering Roman Catholic missionary born in the Kingdom of Navarre (now part of Spain) and co-founder of the Society of Jesus.
  - Dissolution of the Monasteries – set of administrative and legal processes between 1536 and 1541 by which Henry VIII disbanded monasteries, priories, convents and friaries in England, Wales and Ireland; appropriated their income, disposed of their assets, and provided for their former members.
  - European wars of religion – series of wars waged in Europe from ca. 1524 to 1648, following the onset of the Protestant Reformation in Western and Northern Europe.
  - Teresa of Avila – prominent Spanish mystic, Roman Catholic saint, Carmelite nun, and writer of the Counter Reformation, and theologian of contemplative life through mental prayer.
  - First Vatican Council – convoked by Pope Pius IX on 29 June 1868, after a period of planning and preparation that began on 6 December 1864.
  - Second Vatican Council – addressed relations between the Roman Catholic Church and the modern world. It was the twenty-first Ecumenical Council of the Catholic Church and the second to be held at St. Peter's Basilica in the Vatican.
  - Modernism (Roman Catholicism) – refers to theological opinions expressed during the late 19th and early 20th centuries, but with influence reaching into the 21st century, which are characterized by a break with the past.

===== Other churches =====
====== 1517 AD – 1648 AD ======
- Protestant Reformation – 16th-century schism within Western Christianity initiated by Martin Luther, John Calvin and other early Protestants sparked by the 1517 posting of Luther's Ninety-five theses.
  - History of Protestantism – summary of the history of Protestantism
    - Desiderius Erasmus – Dutch Renaissance humanist, Catholic priest, social critic, teacher, and theologian.
    - Five Solas – five Latin phrases that emerged during the Protestant Reformation and summarize the Reformers' basic theological beliefs in contradistinction to the teaching of the Roman Catholic Church of the day.
    - Eucharistic theologies contrasted – views of a number of churches regarding Eucharistic theology, contrasted.
    - History of Calvinist-Arminian debate – dispute between Dutch Protestants in the early seventeenth century.
    - Arminianism – school of soteriological thought within Protestant Christianity based on the theological ideas of the Dutch Reformed theologian Jacobus Arminius (1560–1609) and his historic followers, the Remonstrants.
    - Synod of Dort – National Synod held in Dordrecht in 1618–1619, by the Dutch Reformed Church, to settle a divisive controversy initiated by the rise of Arminianism.
    - European wars of religion – series of wars waged in Europe from ca. 1524 to 1648, following the onset of the Protestant Reformation in Western and Northern Europe.
  - Lutheranism – major branch of Western Christianity that identifies with the theology of Martin Luther, a German reformer.
    - Martin Luther – German monk, priest, professor of theology and iconic figure of the Protestant Reformation.
    - The Ninety-Five Theses – On the eve of All Saint's Day, October 31, 1517, Luther posted the ninety-five theses, which he had composed in Latin, on the door of the Castle Church of Wittenberg, according to university custom.
    - Diet of Worms – diet (a formal deliberative assembly, specifically an Imperial Diet) that took place in Worms, Germany, and is most memorable for the Edict of Worms (Wormser Edikt), which addressed Martin Luther and the effects of the Protestant Reformation.
    - Philipp Melanchthon – German reformer, collaborator with Martin Luther, the first systematic theologian of the Protestant Reformation, intellectual leader of the Lutheran Reformation, and an influential designer of educational systems.
    - Lutheran Orthodoxy – an era in the history of Lutheranism, which began in 1580 from the writing of the Book of Concord and ended at the Age of Enlightenment.
    - Sacramental union – Lutheran theological doctrine of the Real Presence of the body and blood of Christ in the Christian Eucharist.
    - Book of Concord – historic doctrinal standard of the Lutheran Church, consisting of ten credal documents recognized as authoritative in Lutheranism since the 16th century.
  - Reformed churches – group of Protestant denominations characterized by Calvinist doctrines.
    - Theology of Huldrych Zwingli – based on the Bible, taking scripture as the inspired word of God and placing its authority higher than human sources such as the Ecumenical councils and the church fathers.
    - Reformation in Switzerland – promoted initially by Huldrych Zwingli, who gained the support of the magistrate (Mark Reust) and population of Zürich in the 1520s.
    - John Calvin – an influential French theologian and pastor during the Protestant Reformation.
      - Calvinism – Protestant theological system and an approach to the Christian life.
      - History of Calvinism – Calvinism began as part of the Magisterial Reformation branch of the Protestant Reformation.
    - Scottish Reformation – was Scotland's formal break with the Papacy in 1560, and the events surrounding this.
    - John Knox – Scottish clergyman and a leader of the Protestant Reformation who brought reformation to the church in Scotland.
    - TULIP – five points of Calvinism, also called the doctrines of grace, which are a point-by-point response to the five points of the Arminian Remonstrance
    - Synod of Dort – National Synod held in Dordrecht in 1618–1619, by the Dutch Reformed Church, to settle a divisive controversy initiated by the rise of Arminianism.
  - English Reformation – series of events in 16th-century England by which the Church of England broke away from the authority of the Pope and the Roman Catholic Church.
    - Timeline of the English Reformation – This is a timeline of the Protestant Reformation in England.
    - Henry VIII of England – was King of England from 21 April 1509 until his death.
    - Thomas Cranmer – leader of the English Reformation and Archbishop of Canterbury during the reigns of Henry VIII, Edward VI and, for a short time, Mary I.
    - Elizabethan Religious Settlement – was Elizabeth I's response to the religious divisions created over the reigns of Henry VIII, Edward VI and Mary I.
    - Thirty-Nine Articles – historically defining statements of doctrines of the Church of England with respect to the controversies of the English Reformation.
    - Book of Common Prayer – short title of a number of related prayer books used in the Anglican Communion, as well as by the Continuing Anglican, "Anglican realignment" and other Anglican churches.
    - Puritanism – significant grouping of English Protestants in the 16th and 17th centuries, including, but not limited to, English Calvinists.
    - English Civil War – series of armed conflicts and political machinations between Parliamentarians (Roundheads) and Royalists (Cavaliers).
    - Westminster Assembly – was appointed by the Long Parliament to restructure the Church of England.
  - Anabaptism – are Protestant Christians of the Radical Reformation of 16th-century Europe, although some consider Anabaptism to be a distinct movement from Protestantism.
    - Radical Reformation – 16th century response to what was believed to be both the corruption in the Roman Catholic Church and the expanding Magisterial Protestant movement led by Martin Luther and many others.
    - Conrad Grebel – son of a prominent Swiss merchant and councilman, was a co-founder of the Swiss Brethren movement and is often called the "Father of Anabaptists".
    - Swiss Brethren – branch of Anabaptism that started in Zürich, spread to nearby cities and towns, and then was exported to neighboring countries
    - Müntzer – an early Reformation-era German theologian, who became a rebel leader during the Peasants' War.
    - Martyrs' Synod – took place in Augsburg, Germany, from 20 to 24 August 1527.
    - Menno Simons – an Anabaptist religious leader from the Friesland region of the Low Countries.
    - John Smyth (Baptist minister) – an early Baptist minister of England and a defender of the principle of religious liberty.

====== 1648 AD – 1789 AD ======
- Christian revival – term that generally refers to a specific period of increased spiritual interest or renewal in the life of a church congregation or many churches, either regionally or globally.
  - 17th century denominations in England – large number of religious denominations emerged during the early-to-mid-17th century in England.
  - Baptists – Christians who comprise a group of denominations and churches that subscribe to a doctrine that baptism should be performed only for professing believers (believer's baptism, as opposed to infant baptism), and that it must be done by immersion (as opposed to affusion or sprinkling).
  - Congregational church – Protestant Christian churches practicing Congregationalist church governance, in which each congregation independently and autonomously runs its own affairs.
  - First Great Awakening – Christian revitalization movement that swept Protestant Europe and British America, and especially the American colonies in the 1730s and 1740s, leaving a permanent impact on American religion.
  - Methodism – movement of Anglican Christianity represented by a number of denominations and organizations, claiming a total of approximately seventy million adherents worldwide.
  - Millerites – followers of the teachings of William Miller who, in 1833, first shared publicly his belief in the coming Second Advent of Jesus Christ in roughly the year 1843.
  - Pietism – movement within Lutheranism, lasting from the late 17th century to the mid-18th century and later.
  - Neo-Lutheranism – 19th century revival movement within Lutheranism which began with the Pietist driven Erweckung, or Awakening, and developed in reaction against theological rationalism and pietism.
  - Old Lutherans – those German Lutherans who refused to join the Prussian Union (Evangelical Christian Church) in the 1830s and 1840s.
  - Restoration Movement – Christian movement that began on the American frontier during the Second Great Awakening of the early 19th century.
  - History of Jehovah's Witnesses – had its origins in the Bible Student movement, which developed in the United States in the 1870s among followers of Christian Restorationist minister Charles Taze Russell.
  - History of the Latter Day Saint movement – religious movement within Christianity that arose during the Second Great Awakening in the early 19th century
  - History of the Seventh-day Adventist Church – had its roots in the Millerite movement of the 1830s and 1840s

====== 1789 AD – 1914 AD ======
- Industrial Revolution – period from 1750 to 1850 where changes in agriculture, manufacturing, mining, transportation, and technology had a profound effect on the social, economic and cultural conditions of the times.
  - Camp meeting – form of Protestant Christian religious service originating in Britain and once common in some parts of the United States, wherein people would travel from a large area to a particular site to camp out, listen to itinerant preachers, and pray.
  - Holiness movement – set of beliefs and practices emerging from the Methodist Christian church in the mid 19th century.
  - Independent Catholic Churches – are Catholic congregations that are not in communion with the Roman Catholic Church or any other churches whose sacraments are recognized by the Roman Catholic Church (such as the Eastern Orthodox and some Oriental Orthodox churches)
  - Second Great Awakening – Christian revival movement during the early 19th century in the United States. The movement began around 1800, had begun to gain momentum by 1820, and was in decline by 1870.

====== 1914 AD – present ======
Age of Ideologies

- Azusa Street Revival – historic Pentecostal revival meeting that took place in Los Angeles, California and is the origin of the Pentecostal movement.
- Ecumenism – mainly refers to initiatives aimed at greater Christian unity or cooperation.
- Evangelicalism – Protestant Christian movement which began in the 17th century and became an organized movement with the emergence around 1730 of the Methodists in England and the Pietists among Lutherans in Germany and Scandinavia.
- Jesus movement – movement in Christianity beginning on the West Coast of the United States in the late 1960s and early 1970s and spreading primarily through North America and Europe, before dying out by the early 1980s.
- Mainline (Protestant) – are certain Protestant churches in the United States that comprised a majority of Americans from the colonial era until the early 20th century.
- Pentecostalism – renewal movement within Christianity that places special emphasis on a direct personal experience of God through the baptism in the Holy Spirit.
- Charismatic movement – an ongoing international, cross-denominational/non-denominational Christian movement in which individual, historically mainstream congregations adopt beliefs and practices similar to Pentecostals.
- Emerging church – Christian movement of the late 20th and early 21st century that crosses a number of theological boundaries

=== History of Christianity by denomination ===
These articles contain histories of the denominations they reference.

- History of the Anglican Communion
- History of Calvinism
- History of Calvinist-Arminian debate
- History of the Eastern Orthodox Church
  - History of the Eastern Orthodox Church under the Ottoman Empire
  - History of Eastern Orthodox Churches in the 20th century
  - History of the Russian Orthodox Church
- History of Oriental Orthodoxy
- History of Protestantism
- History of the Puritans
- History of the Quakers
- History of the Roman Catholic Church
- History of the Seventh-day Adventist Church

=== History of Christianity by region ===
These articles detail the history of Christianity in the regions they reference.

- History of Arab Christians
- History of the Church of England
- Baptism of Poland
- Christianization of Hungary
- Germanic Christianity
- Gothic Christianity
- History of Christianity in the United States
- History of Church activities in Zambia
- History of Eastern Christianity
  - History of Eastern Christianity in Asia
- Christianisation of Iceland
- Christianization of Lithuania
- Christianity among the Mongols
- Christianity in Eastern Arabia
- History of Christianity in Romania
- History of Christianity in Scotland
- Conversion of Pomerania
- Christianization of Kievan Rus'
- Christianization of Scandinavia
- History of Christianity in Ukraine
- History of Christianity in the United States

== Texts ==
- Bible – any one of the collections of the primary religious texts of Judaism and Christianity.

- Old Testament – Christian term for the religious writings of ancient Israel held sacred and inspired by Christians, and which overlaps with the 24-book canon of the Masoretic Text of Judaism.

- Law– first five books of the Hebrew Bible.
- Writings – third and final section of the Hebrew Bible.
- Prophets – second of the three major sections in the Hebrew Bible.
- Deuterocanonical books – term used since the sixteenth century in the Catholic Church and Eastern Christianity to describe certain books and passages of the Christian Old Testament that are not part of the Hebrew Bible.

- New Testament – second major division of the Christian biblical canon, the first division being the Old Testament.

- Gospels – an account, often written, that describes the life of Jesus of Nazareth.
- Epistles – writing directed or sent to a person or group of people, usually an elegant and formal didactic letter.
- Bible prophecy – prediction of future events based on the action, function, or faculty of a prophet.

- Antilegomena – written texts whose authenticity or value is disputed
  - Book of Mormon – sacred text of the Latter Day Saint movement that adherents believe contains writings of ancient prophets who lived on the American continent from approximately 2200 BC to AD 421.
- Notha – works rejected by the early Church.

- Gospel of Thomas – well preserved early Christian, non-canonical sayings-gospel discovered near Nag Hammadi, Egypt, in December 1945, in one of a group of books known as the Nag Hammadi library.

- Authors of the Bible – Few biblical books are regarded by scholars as the product of a single individual; all have been edited and revised to produce the work we read today.
- The Bible and history – Bible from a historical perspective, includes numerous fields of study, ranging from archeology and astronomy to linguistics and methods of comparative literature.
- Bible chronology – Bible (Tanakh / Old Testament) measures the passage of time and thus gives a chronological framework to biblical history from the Creation until the kingdoms of Israel and Judah through various genealogies, generations, reign-periods, and other means.
- Coptic versions of the Bible – There have been many Coptic versions of the Bible, including some of the earliest translations into any language.
- Genealogy of the Bible – There are various genealogies described in the Bible.
- History of the English Bible – Partial translations of the Bible into languages of the English people can be traced back to the end of the 7th century, including translations into Old English and Middle English.
- List of burial places of biblical figures – list of burial places attributed to Biblical personalities according to various religious and local traditions.
- List of artifacts significant to the Bible – list of artifacts, objects created or modified by human culture, that are significant to the historicity of the Bible.
- Syriac versions of the Bible – Syria played an important or even predominant role in the beginning of Christianity.

== Jesus ==
- Jesus – central figure in Christianity
  - Christian views of Jesus – are based on the teachings and beliefs outlined in the Canonical gospels, New Testament letters, and the Christian creeds; they outline the key beliefs held by Christians about Jesus, including his divinity, humanity, and earthly life.
  - Historical Jesus – scholarly reconstructions of the 1st-century figure Jesus of Nazareth
  - New Testament view on Jesus' life – four canonical gospels of the New Testament are the primary sources of information for the doctrinal Christian narrative of the life of Jesus.
    - Gospel – an account, often written, that describes the life of Jesus of Nazareth.
    - Gospel harmony – an attempt to merge or harmonize the canonical gospels of the Four Evangelists into a single gospel account.
  - Ministry of Jesus – begins with his baptism in the countryside of Judea, near the river Jordan and ends in Jerusalem, following the Last Supper with his disciples.
  - Miracles attributed to Jesus – supernatural deeds of Jesus, as recorded in Gospels, in the course of his ministry.
  - Parables of Jesus – found in all the Canonical gospels as well as in some of the non-canonical gospels but are located mainly within the three synoptic gospels.

=== Major events in Jesus' life from the Gospels ===
==== From birth to the Passion ====
- Nativity of Jesus – accounts of the birth of Jesus, primarily based on the two accounts in the gospels of Luke and Matthew, and secondarily on some apocryphal texts.
- Baptism of Jesus – marks the beginning of Jesus Christ's public ministry.
- Temptation of Christ – detailed in the Gospels of Matthew, Mark, and Luke.
- Ministry of Jesus – begins with his baptism in the countryside of Judea, near the river Jordan and ends in Jerusalem
- Commissioning the twelve apostles – an episode in the life of Jesus that appears in all three Synoptic Gospels
- Sermon on the Mount – collection of sayings and teachings of Jesus
- Rejection of Jesus – Canonical Gospels of the New Testament include some accounts of the rejection of Jesus in the course of his ministry.
- Transfiguration of Jesus – an event reported in the New Testament in which Jesus is transfigured (or metamorphosed) and becomes radiant upon a mountain.
- Great Commandment – Jesus' commentary on two commandments taken from the Law of Moses of the Old Testament which are commonly seen as important to Christian ethics.
- Palm Sunday – Christian moveable feast that falls on the Sunday before Easter.
- Cursing the fig tree – Jesus curses a fig tree for being barren; ... the next day, the tree has withered
- Cleansing of the Temple – he expels the money changers from the Temple
- Second Coming – anticipated return of Jesus Christ from Heaven
- Anointing of Jesus – an event reported by each of the Canonical gospels, in which a woman pours the entire contents of an alabastron of very expensive perfume over the head (according to Mark and Matthew) or feet (according to John and Luke) of Jesus.
- Last Supper – final meal that, according to Christian belief, Jesus shared with His Apostles in Jerusalem before his crucifixion.
- Paraclete – means advocate or helper. In Christianity, the term most commonly refers to the Holy Spirit.

==== The Passion ====
Main article: Passion (Christianity)

This is the Christian term used for the events and suffering of Jesus in the hours before and including his trial and execution by crucifixion.

- Arrest of Jesus – pivotal event recorded in the Canonical gospels.
- Sanhedrin Trial of Jesus – trial of Jesus before a Jewish Council following his arrest in Jerusalem and prior to his dispensation by Pontius Pilate.
- Pilate's court – trial of Jesus in praetorium before Pontius Pilate, preceded by the Sanhedrin preliminary hearing.
- Flagellation of Christ – scene from the Passion of Christ very frequently shown in Christian art
- Crown of thorns – one of the instruments of the Passion, was woven of thorn branches and placed on Jesus Christ before his crucifixion.
- Crucifixion of Jesus – an event that occurred during the 1st century AD.
- Entombment of Christ – occurred after his death by crucifixion, when, according to the gospel accounts, he was placed in a new tomb belonging to Joseph of Arimathea.

==== Resurrection and Ascension ====
- Resurrection of Jesus – Christian religious belief that Jesus Christ returned to bodily life on the Sunday following the Friday on which he was executed by crucifixion.
- Empty tomb – tomb of Jesus which was found to be empty by the women who were present at Jesus' crucifixion.
- Resurrection appearances of Jesus – are reported to have occurred after his death, burial and resurrection, but prior to his Ascension.
- Great Commission – instruction of the resurrected Jesus Christ to his disciples that they spread his teachings to all the nations of the world.
- Ascension of Jesus – Christian teaching found in the New Testament that the resurrected Jesus was taken up to heaven in his resurrected body, in the presence of eleven of his apostles, occurring 40 days after the resurrection.

== Christian people by type ==
- Lists of Christians

=== Apostles (the Twelve) ===
- Saint Andrew – considered the founder and the first bishop of the Church of Byzantium and is consequently the patron saint of the Ecumenical Patriarchate of Constantinople.
- Bartholomew the Apostle – one of the Twelve Apostles of Jesus, and is usually identified as Nathaniel
- James, son of Alphaeus – one of the Twelve Apostles of Jesus Christ
- James, son of Zebedee – only apostle whose martyrdom is recorded in the New Testament.
- John the Apostle – Christian tradition holds that he outlived the remaining apostles—all of whom suffered martyrdom (except Judas Iscariot)—and ultimately died of natural causes "in great old age in Ephesus" at the beginning of the second century.
- Judas Iscariot – infamously known for his kiss and betrayal of Jesus to the hands of the chief Sanhedrin priests for a ransom of 30 pieces of silver.
- Jude the Apostle – generally identified with Thaddeus, and is also variously called Jude of James, Jude Thaddaeus, Judas Thaddaeus or Lebbaeus.
- Matthew the Evangelist – one of the twelve Apostles of Jesus and one of the four Evangelists.
- Saint Peter – an early Christian leader; one of the twelve apostles of Jesus; venerated as a saint; regarded as the first Pope by the Catholic Church.
- Philip the Apostle – one of the Twelve Apostles of Jesus. Later Christian traditions describe Philip as the apostle who preached in Greece, Syria, and Phrygia.
- Simon the Zealot – one of the most obscure among the apostles of Jesus. Little is recorded of him aside from his name.
- Thomas the Apostle – one of the Twelve Apostles of Jesus; perhaps the only Apostle who went outside the Roman Empire to preach the Gospel.

=== New Testament people (other than the Twelve) ===
==== In the gospels ====
===== Individuals =====
- Alphaeus – Alphaeus is mentioned in the New Testament as the father of two of the Twelve Apostles – James and John.
- Anna (Bible) – Anna or Anna the Prophetess was a biblical figure mentioned only in the Gospel of Luke.
- Annas – Annas was appointed by the Roman legate Quirinius as the first High Priest of the newly formed Roman province of Iudaea in 6 AD; just after the Romans had deposed Archelaus, Ethnarch of Judaea, thereby putting Judaea directly under Roman rule.
- Barabbas – Barabbas or Jesus Barabbas is a figure in the Christian narrative of the Passion of Jesus, in which he is the insurrectionary whom Pontius Pilate freed at the Passover feast in Jerusalem.
- Bartimaeus (Biblical character) – Each of the three synoptic gospels tells of Jesus healing the blind near Jericho, as he passed through that town, shortly before his passion.
- Blind man of Bethsaida – The Blind Man of Bethsaida is the subject of one of the miracles of Jesus in the Gospels.
- Caiaphas – Joseph, son of Caiaphas, known as Caiaphas, was the Roman-appointed Jewish high priest who is said to have organized the plot to kill Jesus.
- Cleopas – Cleopas was a figure of early Christianity, one of the two disciples who encountered Jesus during the Road to Emmaus appearance in the Gospel of Luke 24:13-32.
- Clopas – Clopas is a figure of early Christianity.
- Christian teaching about the Devil – In mainstream Christianity, the Devil is named Satan, and sometimes Lucifer.
- Penitent thief – The Penitent thief, also known as the Thief on the Cross or the Good Thief, is an unnamed character mentioned in the Gospel of Luke who was crucified alongside Jesus and asked Jesus to remember him in his kingdom, unlike his companion the Impenitent thief.
- Elizabeth (biblical figure) –
- Gabriel – In Abrahamic religions, Gabriel is an Archangel who typically serves as a messenger to humans from God.
- Impenitent thief – The impenitent thief was one of the two thieves who was crucified alongside Jesus.
- Daughter of Jairus – The record of the daughter of Jairus is a combination of miracles of Jesus in the Gospels.
- Joachim – Saint Joachim was the husband of Saint Anne and the father of Mary, the mother of Jesus in the Roman Catholic, Orthodox, and Anglican traditions.
- Saint Joanna – Saint Joanna was one of the women associated with the ministry of Jesus of Nazareth, often considered to be one of the disciples who later became an apostle (Rom 16:7).
- John the Baptist – John the Baptist was an itinerant preacher and a major religious figure mentioned in the Canonical gospels.
- Saint Joseph –
- Joseph of Arimathea – Joseph of Arimathea was, according to the Gospels, the man who donated his own prepared tomb for the burial of Jesus after Jesus' Crucifixion.
- Joses – Saint Joses (or Joseph or Joset) is the second of the "brothers of Jesus" appearing in the New Testament.
- Jude, brother of Jesus – Jude (alternatively Judas or Judah) was a brother of Jesus, according to the New Testament.
- Lazarus of Bethany – Lazarus of Bethany, also known as Saint Lazarus or Lazarus of the Four Days, is the subject of a prominent miracle attributed to Jesus in the Gospel of John, in which Jesus restores him to life four days after his death.
- Legion (demon) – Legion is a group of demons referred to in the Christian Bible.
- Luke the Evangelist – Luke the Evangelist was an Early Christian writer whom Church Fathers such as Jerome and Eusebius said was the author of the Gospel of Luke and the Acts of the Apostles.
- Lysanias – Lysanias was the ruler of a small realm on the western slopes of Mount Hermon, attested to by the Jewish writer Josephus and in coins from circa 40 BC.
- Malchus – In the Gospel of John in the New Testament of the Bible, Malchus is the servant of the Jewish High Priest, Caiaphas, who participated in the arrest of Jesus.
- Mark the Evangelist – Mark the Evangelist is the traditional author of the Gospel of Mark.
- Martha – Martha of Bethany is a biblical figure described in the Gospels of Luke and John.
- Mary Magdalene –
- Mary, mother of James – Mary is identified in the synoptic gospels as one of the women who went to Jesus' tomb after he was buried, and, along with Joanna and Salome, is recognized as one of the three "Myrrhbearers" by the Lutheran Church – Missouri Synod, being commemorated in the Calendar of Saints on August 3.
- Mary, mother of Jesus – Mary, called by various titles, styles, and honorifics in Christianity and called Maryam, mother of 'Isa, in Islam, was a Jewish woman of Nazareth in Galilee who lived in the late 1st century BC and early 1st century AD
- Mary of Bethany – Mary of Bethany is a biblical figure described in the Gospels of John and Luke in the Christian New Testament.
- Mary of Clopas – Mary of Clopas (or of Cleopas), the wife of Clopas, was one of various Marys named in the New Testament.
- The Young Man from Nain – The young man from Nain was the widow's son who Christ raised from the dead.
- Nicodemus (Nicodemus ben Gurion) –
- Salome (disciple) – Salome, sometimes venerated as Mary Salome, was a follower of Jesus who appears briefly in the canonical gospels and in more detail in apocryphal writings.
- Samaritan woman at the well – The Samaritan woman at the well is an episode in the life of Jesus that appears only in the Gospel of John, in John 4:4-26.
- Simeon (Gospel of Luke) – Simeon at the temple is the "just and devout" man of Jerusalem who, according to Luke 2:25-35, met the Virgin Mary, Joseph, and Jesus as they entered the Temple to fulfill the requirements of the Law of Moses on the 40th day from Jesus' birth at the presentation of Jesus at the Temple.
- Simon (brother of Jesus) – Simon was the brother of Jesus in the New Testament.
- Simon of Cyrene – Simon of Cyrene was the man compelled by the Romans to carry the cross of Jesus as Jesus was taken to his crucifixion, according to all three Synoptic Gospels.
- Simon the Leper – Simon the Leper is a biblical figure mentioned by the Gospels according to Matthew (26:6-13) and Mark (14:3-9).
- Susanna (disciple) – Susanna is one of the women associated with the ministry of Jesus of Nazareth.
- Theophilus (biblical) – Theophilus is the name or honorary title of the person to whom the Gospel of Luke and the Acts of the Apostles are addressed (Luke 1:3, Acts 1:1).
- Zacchaeus –
- Zebedee – Zebedee, according to all four Canonical gospels, was the father of James and John, two disciples of Jesus.
- Zechariah (priest) – In the Bible, Zechariah, is the father of John the Baptist, a priest of the sons of Aaron, a prophet in Luke 1:67–79, and the husband of Elisabeth who is the cousin of Mary the mother of Jesus.

===== Groups =====
- Angel#Christian beliefs – Angels, in a variety of religions, are regarded as spirits.
- Disciple (Christianity) – In Christianity, the disciples were the students of Jesus during his ministry.
- Four Evangelists – In Christian tradition the Four Evangelists are Matthew, Mark, Luke, and John.
- Godfearers – A God-fearer or Godfearer was a class of non-Jewish (gentile) sympathizer to Second Temple Judaism mentioned in the Christian New Testament and other contemporary sources such as synagogue inscriptions in Diaspora Hellenistic Judaism.
- Herodians – The Herodians were a sect or party mentioned in the New Testament as having on two occasions—once in Galilee, and again in Jerusalem—manifested an unfriendly disposition towards Jesus (Mark 3:6, 12:13; Matthew 22:16; cf. also Mark 8:15, Luke 13:31-32, Acts 4:27).
- Biblical Magi – The Magi, also referred to as the (Three) Wise Men, (Three) Kings, or Kings from the East, were, according to Christian Scripture, a group of distinguished foreigners who visited Jesus after his birth, bearing gifts of gold, frankincense and myrrh.
- Myrrhbearers – In Eastern Orthodoxy the Myrrhbearers are the individuals mentioned in the New Testament who were directly involved in the burial or who discovered the empty tomb following the resurrection of Jesus.
- Pharisees – The Pharisees were at various times a political party, a social movement, and a school of thought among Jews during the Second Temple period beginning under the Hasmonean dynasty (140–37 BCE) in the wake of the Maccabean Revolt.
- Proselytes – The biblical term "Proselyte" is an anglicization of the Koine Greek term προσήλυτος/proselytos, as used in the Greek Old Testament for "stranger".
- Sadducees – The Sadducees were a sect or group of Jews that were active in Ancient Israel during the Second Temple period, starting from the second century BC through the destruction of the Temple in 70 AD.
- Samaritans – The Samaritans are an ethnoreligious group of the Levant.
- Sanhedrin – The Sanhedrin was an assembly of twenty-three judges appointed in every city in the Biblical Land of Israel.
- Seventy disciples – The seventy disciples or seventy-two disciples (known in the Eastern Christian tradition as the seventy apostles) were early followers of Jesus mentioned in the Gospel of Luke 10:1–24.
- Sofer – A Sofer is a Jewish scribe who can transcribe Torah scrolls, Tefillin and Mezuzot, and other religious writings.
- Adoration of the shepherds – The Adoration of the shepherds, in the Nativity of Jesus in art, is a scene in which shepherds are near witnesses to the birth of Jesus in Bethlehem.
- Zealotry – Zealotry was originally a political movement in 1st century Second Temple Judaism which sought to incite the people of Iudaea Province to rebel against the Roman Empire and expel it from the Holy land by force of arms, most notably during the First Jewish–Roman War (66–70).

==== In the Acts of the Apostles ====
- Peter
- Paul
- Aeneas (Bible) –
- Agabus – Saint Agabus or Saint Agabo was an early follower of Christianity mentioned in the Acts of the Apostles as a prophet.
- Ananias and Sapphira – Ananias and his wife Sapphira were, according to the Acts of the Apostles, members of the Early Christian church in Jerusalem.
- Ananias of Damascus – Ananias, was a disciple of Jesus at Damascus mentioned in the Acts of the Apostles in the Bible, which describes how he was sent by Jesus to restore the sight of "Saul, of Tarsus" (known later as Paul the Apostle) and provide him with additional instruction in the way of the Lord.
- Ananias son of Nedebaios – Ananias son of Nedebaios, called "Ananias ben Nebedeus" in the Book of Acts, was a high priest who presided during the trial of Paul at Jerusalem and Caesarea.
- Apollos – Saint Apollos is an apostle who is also a 1st-century Alexandrian Jewish Christian mentioned several times in the New Testament.
- Priscilla and Aquila –
- Aristarchus of Thessalonica – Aristarchus or Aristarch, "a Greek Macedonian of Thessalonica" (Acts 27:2), was an early Christian mentioned in a few passages of the New Testament.
- Elymas – Elymas, also known as Bar-Jesus, was a Jewish magician who appears in the New Testament in the Acts of the Apostles, chapter 13.
- Barnabas – Barnabas, born Joseph, was an Early Christian, one of the earliest Christian disciples in Jerusalem.
- Blastus – Blastus was the chamberlain of Herod Agrippa (Acts 12:20), and a mediator for the Sidonians and Tyrians.
- Cornelius the Centurion – Cornelius was a Roman centurion who is considered by Christians to be the first Gentile to convert to the faith, as related in Acts of the Apostles.
- Demetrius (Bible) – The name Demetrius occurs in two places in the Bible, both in the New Testament:
- Dionysius the Areopagite – Dionysius the Areopagite was a judge of the Areopagus who, as related in the Acts of the Apostles, (Acts 17:34), was converted to Christianity by the preaching of the Apostle Paul during the Areopagus sermon.
- Dorcas – Dorcas was a disciple who lived in Joppa, referenced in the Book of Acts 9:36–42 of the Bible. Acts recounts that when she died, she was mourned by "all the widows ... crying and showing (Peter) the robes and other clothing that Dorcas had made while she was still with them."
- Ethiopian eunuch –
- Eutychus – Eutychus was a young man of Troas tended to by St. Paul.
- Gamaliel – Gamaliel the Elder was a leading authority in the Sanhedrin in the mid 1st century CE.
- James the Just – James, first Bishop of Jerusalem, who died in 62 or 69, was an important figure in Early Christianity.
- Jason of Tarsus – Jason of Tarsus is numbered among the Seventy Disciples.
- Joseph Barsabbas – In the Christian New Testament, Joseph Justus (also known as Barsabbas) figures momentarily in the casting of lots among the 120 or so gathered together after the Ascension of Jesus, to replace Judas Iscariot and bring the Apostles again to the number twelve.
- Judas Barsabbas – Judas Barsabbas is a minor character in the New Testament.
- Judas of Galilee – Judas of Galilee or Judas of Gamala led a violent resistance to the census imposed for Roman tax purposes by Quirinius in Iudaea Province around AD 6.
- Lucius of Cyrene – Lucius of Cyrene was, according to the Book of Acts, one of the founders of the Christian Church in Antioch, then part of Roman Syria.
- Luke the Evangelist – Luke the Evangelist was an Early Christian writer whom Church Fathers such as Jerome and Eusebius said was the author of the Gospel of Luke and the Acts of the Apostles.
- Lydia of Thyatira – Lydia of Thyatira is a character in the New Testament.
- Manahen – Saint Manahen was a teacher of the Church of Antioch and the foster brother of Herod Antipas.
- John Mark – John Mark is a character in the New Testament.
- Mary, mother of John Mark – Mary, mother of John Mark is a character in the Bible.
- Saint Matthias – Matthias (d. 80), according to the Acts of the Apostles, was the apostle chosen by the remaining eleven apostles to replace Judas Iscariot following Judas' betrayal of Jesus and his suicide.
- Nicholas the Deacon – Nicolaism (also Nicholaism, Nicolationism, or Nicolaitanism) is a Christian heresy, first mentioned (twice) in the Book of Revelation of the New Testament, whose adherents were called Nicolaitans, Nicolaitanes, or Nicolaites.
- Paul the Apostle –
- Philip the Evangelist – Saint Philip the Evangelist appears several times in the Acts of the Apostles.
- Priscilla and Aquila –
- Saint Publius –
- Rhoda (Bible) – Rhoda is a minor character in the New Testament. She appears only in Acts 12:12-15.
- Ananias and Sapphira – Ananias and his wife Sapphira were, according to the Acts of the Apostles, members of the Early Christian church in Jerusalem.
- Sceva – Sceva, or Scevas, apparently related to the Greek word skeuos meaning a vessel or implement, a Jew called a "chief priest" (archiereus in Greek) in Acts 19:14.
- Seven Deacons – The Seven Deacons were leaders elected by the Early Christian church to minister to the people of Jerusalem.
- Silas/Silvanus of the Seventy – Saint Silas or Saint Silvanus was a leading member of the Early Christian community, who later accompanied Paul in some of his missionary journeys.
- Simeon Niger – Simeon Niger is a person in the Book of Acts in the New Testament.
- Simon Magus – Simon the Sorcerer or Simon the Magician, in Latin Simon Magus, was a Samaritan magus or religious figure and a convert to Christianity, baptised by Philip the Evangelist, whose later confrontation with Peter is recorded in Acts 8:9-24.
- Sopater – Sopater was the son of Pyrhus, a man from the city of Berea.
- Saint Stephen – Saint Stephen, the protomartyr of Christianity, is venerated as a saint in the Roman Catholic, Anglican, Lutheran, Oriental Orthodox and Eastern Orthodox Churches.
- Theudas – Theudas (died c. 46 AD) was a Jewish rebel of the 1st century AD.
- Saint Timothy – Timothy was a first-century Christian bishop who died around the year 80.
- Titus (biblical) – Titus was an early Christian leader, a companion of Saint Paul, mentioned in several of the Pauline epistles.
- Trophimus – Trophimus the Ephesian was a Christian who accompanied Paul during a part of his third missionary journey (Acts 20:4; 21:29).
- Tychicus – Tychicus is one of Paul's companions in the New Testament.

==== In the Epistles ====
See also Epistles

- Achaichus – Achaichus was one of the members of the church of Corinth who, with Fortunatus and Stephanas, visited Paul while he was at Ephesus, for the purpose of consulting him on the affairs of the church (I Corinthians 16:17).
- Alexander (Ephesian) – Alexander (fl. 50–65) was an early Christian, one of two heretical teachers at Ephesus—the other being Hymenaeus—against whom Paul warns Timothy.
- Andronicus of Pannonia – Andronicus of Pannonia was a 1st-century Christian mentioned by the Apostle Paul:
- Archippus – Archippus (Greek for "master of the horse") was an early Christian believer mentioned briefly in the New Testament epistles of Philemon and Colossians.
- Aretas IV Philopatris – Aretas IV Philopatris was the King of the Nabataeans from roughly 9 BC to AD 40.
- Crescens – Crescens was an individual who appears in the New Testament.
- Diotrephes – Diotrephes was a man mentioned in the (Third Epistle of John, verses 9–11).
- Epaphras – Epaphras was a Christian preacher who spread the Gospel to his fellow Colossian citizens (Col. 1:7; 4:12).
- Epaphroditus – Epaphroditus is a New Testament figure appearing as an envoy of the Philippian church to assist the Apostle Paul (Phil. 2.25-30).
- Erastus of Corinth – According to the Epistle to the Romans, Erastus was Corinth's οἰκονόμος (oikonomos), a position of high status.
- Euodia and Syntyche – Euodia and Syntyche were female members of the church in Philippi, and according to the text of Philippians 4: 2–3, they were involved in a disagreement together.
- Hymenaeus (Ephesian) – Hymenaeus (fl. 50–65) was an early Christian from Ephesus, an opponent of the apostle Paul, who associates him with Alexander and Philetus.
- Jesus Justus – Jesus Justus is referred to by the Apostle Paul of Tarsus in Colossians 4:11.
- Junia – Junia or Junias was a 1st-century Christian highly regarded and complimented by the apostle Paul:
- Mary (Romans 16:6) – The Apostle Paul's Epistle to the Romans (16:6) mentions a Mary.
- Michael (archangel) – Michael is an archangel in Jewish, Christian, and Islamic teachings.
- Nymphas – A man or a woman, depending on accenting of the Greek text, in the New Testament saluted by Paul of Tarsus in his Epistle to the Colossians as a member of the church of Laodicea (Colossians 4:15).
- Onesimus – Saint Onesimus (d. ca. 68 AD) was a slave to Philemon of Colossae, a man of Christian faith.
- Philemon (New Testament person) – Philemon was an early Christian in Asia Minor who was the recipient of a private letter from Paul of Tarsus.
- Philetus (Ephesian) – Philetus (fl. 50–65) was an early Christian mentioned by Paul, who warns Timothy against him as well as against his associate in error, Hymenaeus.
- Phoebe (Bible) – Phoebe was a Christian woman mentioned by the Apostle Paul in Romans 16:1.
- Tertius of Iconium – Tertius of Iconium acted as an amanuensis for the Apostle Paul, writing down his letter to the Romans.

==== In the Book of Revelation ====
See also Book of Revelation

- Antipas of Pergamum – Saint Antipas is referred to in the Book of Revelation (Revelation 2:13) as the "faithful martyr" of Pergamon, "where Satan dwells".
- Four Horsemen of the Apocalypse –
- Abaddon – The Hebrew term Abaddon, is an intensive form of the word "destruction," which appears as a place of destruction in the Hebrew Bible.
- Two witnesses – The two witnesses are two of God's prophets who are seen in a vision by John of Patmos, who appear during the Second woe in the Book of Revelation 11:1-14.
- Woman of the Apocalypse – The Woman of the Apocalypse is a figure from the Book of Revelation, chapter 12. Her identity has been the subject of a wide variety of interpretations.
- The Beast (Bible) – The Beast may refer to two beasts described in the Book of Revelation.
- Three Angels' Messages –
- Whore of Babylon – The Whore of Babylon or "Babylon the Great" is a Christian allegorical figure of evil mentioned in the Book of Revelation in the Bible.

==== Romans & 'Herod's family ====
===== In the Gospels =====
- Herod Antipas – Herod Antipater (born before 20 BC – died after 39 AD), known by the nickname Antipas, was a 1st-century AD ruler of Galilee and Perea, who bore the title of tetrarch ("ruler of a quarter").
- Herod Archelaus – Herod Archelaus (23 BC – c. 18 AD) was the ethnarch of Samaria, Judea, and Idumea (biblical Edom) from 4 BC to 6 AD.
- Philip – Philip the Tetrarch (sometimes called Herod Philip II by modern writers) was son of Herod the Great and his fifth wife Cleopatra of Jerusalem and half-brother of Herod Antipas and Herod Archelaus (not to be confused with Herod II, whom some writers call Herod Philip I.)
- Herod the Great – Herod Archelaus, Herod Antipas
- Herodias – Herodias (c. 15 BC-after 39 AD) was a Jewish princess of the Herodian Dynasty.
- Saint Longinus – Longinus is the name given in medieval and some modern Christian traditions to the Roman soldier who pierced Jesus in his side with a lance, the "Holy Lance" (lancea, in the Latin Vulgate) while he was on the Cross.
- Pontius Pilate – Pontius Pilatus, known in the English-speaking world as Pontius Pilate, was the fifth Prefect of the Roman province of Judaea, from AD 26–36.
- Pontius Pilate's wife – Pontius Pilate's wife is unnamed in the New Testament, where she appears a single time in the Gospel of Matthew.
- Quirinius – Publius Sulpicius Quirinius (c. 51 BC – AD 21) was a Roman aristocrat.
- Salome – daughter of Herod II and Herodias, stepdaughter of Herod Antipas, who demanded and received the head of John the Baptist
- Tiberius – Tiberius (16 November 42 BC – 16 March 37 AD), was Roman Emperor from 14 AD to 37 AD.

===== In the Acts of the Apostles =====
- Cornelius the Centurion – Cornelius was a Roman centurion who is considered by Christians to be the first Gentile to convert to the faith, as related in Acts of the Apostles.
- Agrippa I – Agrippa I, also known as Herod Agrippa or simply Herod (10 BCE – 44 CE), was a King of the Jews during the 1st century AD.
- Agrippa II – Agrippa II (born AD 27/28), son of Agrippa I, and like him originally named Marcus Julius Agrippa, was the seventh and last king of the family of Herod the Great, thus last of the Herodians.
- Drusilla (daughter of Herod Agrippa I) – Drusilla (born 38, died August 25, AD 79) was a daughter of Herod Agrippa I and thus sister to Berenice, Mariamne and Herod Agrippa II.
- Antonius Felix – Marcus Antonius Felix was the Roman procurator of Iudaea Province 52–58, in succession to Ventidius Cumanus.
- Claudius Lysias – Claudius Lysias is a figure mentioned in the New Testament book of the Acts of the Apostles.
- Lucius Iunius Gallio Annaeanus – Lucius Iunius Gallio Annaeanus (originally Lucius Annaeus Novatus), son of the rhetorician Seneca the Elder and the elder brother of Seneca the Younger, was born at Corduba (Cordova) about the beginning of the Christian era.
- Porcius Festus – Porcius Festus was procurator of Judea from about AD 59 to 62, succeeding Antonius Felix.
- Sergius Paulus –

=== Church Fathers ===
- Church Fathers – early and influential theologians, eminent Christian teachers and great bishops.
- List of Church Fathers – list of Christian Church Fathers.
- Apostolic Fathers – small number of Early Christian authors who lived and wrote in the second half of the first century and the first half of the second century.
- Desert Fathers – were hermits, ascetics, and monks who lived mainly in the Scetes desert of Egypt beginning around the third century AD.
- Doctors of the Church – title given by a variety of Christian churches to individuals whom they recognize as having been of particular importance, particularly regarding their contribution to theology or doctrine.
- List of early Christian writers – wrote gospels and other books, some of which were canonized as the New Testament canon developed.
- Patristics – study of Early Christian writers, known as the Church Fathers.

=== Saints ===
- List of early Christian saints, up to 450 AD
- List of saints, incomplete, those since 450 AD

=== Martyrs ===
- Christian martyrs – person who is killed for following Christianity, through stoning, crucifixion, burning at the stake or other forms of torture and capital punishment.
- List of Christian martyrs – hundreds of thousands of Christians have been killed for their faith.
- Foxe's Book of Martyrs – celebrated work of church history and martyrology, first published in English in 1563 by John Day.

=== Popes and patriarchs ===
- List of current patriarchs
- List of Alexandrian patriarchs, early
- List of Alexandrian Popes, Coptic Orthodox
- List of Alexandrian patriarchs, Greek Orthodox
- List of Alexandrian patriarchs, Coptic Catholic
- List of Antiochan patriarchs, early
- List of Antiochan patriarchs, Greek Orthodox
- List of Antiochan patriarchs, Melkite Greek Catholic
- List of Antiochan patriarchs, Syriac Orthodox
- List of Aquileian bishops and patriarchs
- List of Armenian catholicoi
- List of patriarchs of the Church of the East
- List of Bulgarian patriarchs of the Orthodox Church
- List of catholicos of the East
- List of Ethiopian Abunas
- List of Constantinople patriarchs, Ecumenical
- List of Constantinople patriarchs, Armenian
- List of Maronite patriarchs
- List of Moscow Metropolitans and patriarchs
- List of Roman Popes, Catholic

=== By profession ===
- List of Roman Catholic Church artists
- List of Catholic authors
- List of Catholic scientists
- List of Roman Catholic cleric–scientists
- List of Jesuit scientists
- List of Protestant authors
- List of Knights Templar
- List of Christian missionaries
- List of Protestant missionaries in China
- List of Roman Catholic Church musicians
- List of Christian thinkers in science
- List of Christian Nobel laureates
- List of Catholic philosophers and theologians
- List of Christian theologians
- List of people who converted to Christianity
- List of members of Opus Dei
- Quakers in science

== Titles of Christian leaders ==
- Abbess – female superior, or mother superior, of a community of nuns, often an abbey
- Abbot – title given to the head of a monastery in various traditions, including Christianity
- Apostle – An apostle is one who is sent out to preach the good news of the Gospel of Jesus Christ.
- Archbishop – bishop of higher rank, but not of higher sacramental order above that of the three orders of deacon, priest (presbyter), and bishop.
- Bishop – an ordained or consecrated member of the Christian clergy who is generally entrusted with a position of authority and oversight.
- Canon (priest) – priest or minister who is a member of certain bodies of the Christian clergy subject to an ecclesiastical rule (canon).
- Cardinal (Catholicism) – senior ecclesiastical official, usually an ordained bishop, and ecclesiastical prince of the Catholic Church.
- Catholicos – title used for the head of certain churches in some Eastern Christian traditions.
- Chaplain – minister in a specialized setting such as a priest, pastor, rabbi, imam, humanist chaplain or lay representative of a world view attached to a secular institution such as a hospital, prison, military unit, police department, university, or private chapel.
- Circuit rider (religious) – popular term referring to clergy in the earliest years of the United States who were assigned to travel around specific geographic territories to minister to settlers and organize congregations.
- Church Father – early and influential theologians, eminent Christian teachers and great bishops.
- Churchwarden – lay official in a parish church or congregation of the Anglican Communion, usually working as a part-time volunteer.
- Curate – person who is invested with the care or cure (cura) of souls of a parish.
- Deacon – ministry in the Christian Church that is generally associated with service of some kind, but which varies among theological and denominational traditions.
- Deaconesses – non-clerical order in some Christian denominations which sees to the care of women in the community.
- Dean (religion) – cleric holding certain positions of authority within a religious hierarchy.
- Elder (Christianity) – person valued for his wisdom who accordingly holds a particular position of responsibility in a Christian group.
- Evangelism – practice of relaying information about a particular set of beliefs to others who do not hold those beliefs.
- Exarch – metropolitan (a bishop) with jurisdiction not only for the area that was his as a metropolitan, but also over other metropolitans.
- Friar – member of one of the mendicant orders.
- Minister (Christianity) – someone who is authorized by a church or religious organization to perform functions such as teaching of beliefs; leading services such as weddings, baptisms or funerals; or otherwise providing spiritual guidance to the community.
- Missionary – member of a religious group sent into an area to do evangelism or ministries of service
- Monk – person who practices religious asceticism
- Pastor – an ordained leader of a Christian congregation.
- Patriarch – highest-ranking bishops in Eastern Orthodoxy, Oriental Orthodoxy, the Roman Catholic Church (above Major Archbishop and Primate), and the Assyrian Church of the East are termed Patriarchs.
- Pope – Bishop of Rome and the leader of the worldwide Catholic Church
- Preacher – term for someone who preaches sermons or gives homilies.
- Presbyter – leader in local Christian congregations
- Priest – term used in Catholicism, Eastern Orthodoxy, Anglicanism, and some branches of Lutheranism to refer to men and women who have been ordained to a ministerial position through receiving the sacrament of Holy Orders.
- Primate – title or rank bestowed on some bishops in certain Christian churches.
- Rector – there are several usages of the word Rector in Christian parlance, depending on denomination.
- Reverend – style most often used as a prefix to the names of Christian clergy and ministers.
- Sexton – church, congregation, or synagogue officer charged with the maintenance of its buildings and/or the surrounding graveyard.
- Superintendent – head of an administrative division of a Protestant church, largely historical but still in use in Germany.
- Usher – Church usher is the first official representative seen when entering the church.
- Verger – person, usually a layman, who assists in the ordering of religious services, particularly in Anglican churches.
- Vestryman – member of his local church's vestry, or leading body. He is not a member of the clergy.
- Vicar – there are several usages of the term vicar in Christian parlance, depending on denomination.

== Celebrated days ==
- Liturgical year – cycle of liturgical seasons in Christian churches which determines when feast days, including celebrations of saints, are to be observed, and which portions of Scripture are to be read either in an annual cycle or in a cycle of several years.

- Advent – season observed in many Western Christian churches, a time of expectant waiting and preparation for the celebration of the Nativity of Jesus at Christmas.
- Christmas – an annual commemoration of the birth of Jesus Christ

- Christmastide – period from Christmas Eve to Epiphany

- Lent – an observance in the liturgical year of many Christian denominations, lasting for a period of approximately six weeks leading up to Easter.
- Easter Triduum – three-day period from the evening of Maundy Thursday (excluding most of Thursday) to the evening of Resurrection Sunday

- Good Friday – religious holiday observed primarily by Christians commemorating the crucifixion of Jesus Christ and his death at Calvary
- Holy Saturday – day after Good Friday, the last day of Holy Week in which Christians prepare for Easter. It commemorates the day that Jesus Christ's body laid in the tomb.
- Easter – Christian festival and holiday celebrating the resurrection of Jesus Christ on the third day after his crucifixion at Calvary as described in the New Testament

- Passover – Some Christians observe a form of the Jewish holiday of Passover.

== Christianity and other beliefs ==
- Christianity and other religions – some elements appear to be shared between Christianity and other religions
- Christianity and astrology – are seen as incompatible by modern orthodox Christian doctrine.
- Christianity and Buddhism – there is speculation concerning a possible connection between Gautama Buddha and Jesus Christ, and between Buddhism and Christianity, because of perceived similarities.
- Christianity and Druze – There is a historical and traditional connection between Christianity and the Druze faith.
- Christianity and Freemasonry – While the majority of Christian denominations are either supportive of Freemasonry or take no stance on it, there are several that are outwardly opposed to it, and either discourage or outright prohibit their members from joining the fraternity.
- Gnosticism and the New Testament – connection between the Christian sects described by Irenaeus (c.180), and other writers, as gnostikos
- Christianity and Hinduism – it is well known that a number of Indian sages visited Constantinople in Classical Antiquity, claims of significant influence in either direction failed to gain wide acceptance.
- Christianity and Islam – There is a historical and traditional connection between Christianity and Islam.

- Protestantism and Islam – entered into contact during the 16th century, at a time when Protestant movements in northern Europe coincided with the expansion of the Ottoman Empire in southern Europe.

- Christianity and Judaism – these two religions diverged profoundly in the first centuries CE.

- Eastern Orthodoxy and Judaism – Relations between Eastern Orthodoxy and Judaism are thought to have a better history than those relations with Catholic or Protestant Christianity.

- Mormonism and Christianity – have a complex theological, historical, and sociological relationship.
- Christianity and Neoplatonism – was a major influence on Christian theology throughout Late Antiquity and the Middle Ages in the West
- Christianity and Paganism – it has been argued that Christianity was influenced by pagan rituals, pagan solistice/equinox festivals and mystery religions, in a number of ways

== Christianity and society ==
- Ablution in Christianity – Is a prescribed washing of part or all of the body or of possessions, such as clothing or ceremonial objects, with the intent of purification or dedication.
- Christianity and abortion – long and complex history though there is no mention of abortion in the Christian Bible.
- Christianity and alcohol – Christian views on alcohol are varied.
- Christianity and antisemitism – Christian attitudes to Judaism and to the Jewish people developed from numerous factors
- Biblical law in Christianity – Christian views of the Bible's Old Covenant are central to Christian theology, ethics, and practice.
- Christian views on cloning – Christians take multiple different positions.
- Christian views on contraception – historically, contraception was generally condemned by all the major branches of Christianity including the major reformers like Martin Luther and John Calvin.
- Christianity and divorce – Most Christian churches treat divorce negatively; however, Christian denominations vary in their toleration of it.
- Christianity and domestic violence – correlation between Christianity and domestic violence is subject to debate, partly because there have been few studies to correlate the two, and complicated by a culture of silence and acceptance among abuse victims.
- Christianity and environmentalism – variety of views exist among different Christians and Christian denominations regarding the correct relationship between Christianity and environmentalism.
- Christianity and homosexuality – Christian denominations hold a variety of views on the issues of sexual orientation and homosexuality, ranging from outright condemnation to complete acceptance.
- Christian views of marriage – Christians typically regard marriage as instituted and ordained by God for the lifelong relationship between one man as husband and one woman as wife.
- Christianity and multiculturalism – Multiculturalism and Christianity have a long historical association.
- Christianity and politics – historically complex subject and a frequent source of disagreement throughout Church history, and in modern politics between the Christian right and Christian left.
- Christian school – school run on Christian principles or by a Christian organization.
- Christian pacifism – theological and ethical position that any form of violence is incompatible with the Christian faith.
- Christian views of sin – Christian hamartiology describes sin as an act of offence against God by despising his Person and his commandments, and by injuring others
- Sectarian violence among Christians – violence between different sects or denominations of Christianity.
- Christianity and slavery – are varied both regionally and historically.
- Women in Christianity – vary considerably today as they have during the last two millennia.

== See also ==
- Outline of Jesus
- Outline of religion
- Outline of spirituality
- Church (building)
