= Sanctuary of Sorrow =

Sanctuary of Sorrow is Goethe's name for the fold of Christ, wherein, according to His promise (Matt. v. 4) the "mourners" who might gather together there would find relief and be comforted, the path of sorrow leading up to the "porch" of the sanctuary.
