= Jesus Justus =

One of several Jewish Christians in the church at Rome

- Died: 1st century

Jesus Justus (Greek Ιησούς χω λεγόμενος Ιουστος Iesous khō legomenos Ioustos) was one of several Jewish Christians in the church at Rome mentioned by Paul the Apostle in the greetings at the end of the Epistle to the Colossians 4:10–11.

Aristarchus my fellow prisoner greets you, and Mark the cousin of Barnabas (concerning whom you have received instructions--if he comes to you, welcome him), and Jesus who is called Justus. These are the only men of the circumcision among my fellow workers for the kingdom of God, and they have been a comfort to me.

— Colossians 4:10-11

It is generally thought that Paul wrote Colossians while in prison in Rome most likely during AD 50s. Of those with Paul, Justus, Aristarchus, and Mark, the cousin of Barnabas, are said in the letter to be "of the circumcision", that is, Jewish and to have "proved a comfort to me."

The name Jesus was common among Jews in the time of Jesus of Nazareth, being a form of the Old Testament name Joshua (Yeshua ישוע). The extra name "Justus" was likely to distinguish him from his Master, Jesus Christ.

Jesus Justus is not mentioned in a similar passage in Philemon 1:23-24 whereas Aristarchus, Epaphras and Mark are again explicitly named by Paul.

Epaphras, my fellow prisoner in Christ Jesus, sends you greetings. And so do Mark, Aristarchus, Demas and Luke, my fellow workers.

— Philemon 23-24
