= Index of Protestantism-related articles =

Alphabetical list of Protestantism-related articles on English Wikipedia.

== A ==
- Agonoclita
- Amish
- Anabaptism
- Anglicanism
- Anti-Protestantism
- Arminianism

== B ==
- Baptists
- Beguines and Beghards
- Bible
- Bogomilism
- Bosnian Church
- Brethren of the Free Spirit

== C ==
- Calvinism
- Catharism
- Creationism
- Christendom

== D ==
- Diet of Nuremberg
- Donatism
- Dulcinian

== E ==
- Evangelicalism

== F ==
- Faith and rationality

== G ==
- Great Awakenings
- God
- Gospel

== H ==
- History of Protestantism
- Hubmaier, Balthasar
- Hussites

== I ==
- Iconoclasm

== J ==
- Judeo-Christian

== L ==
- Left Behind
- List of Protestant authors
- List of the largest Protestant churches of the world
- Lollardy
- Lord's Prayer
- Lutheranism

== M ==
- Melanchthon, Philip
- Methodism

== N ==
- Nestorianism
- New Testament
- Nicene Creed

== O ==
- Old Testament

== P ==
- Pentecostalism
- Presbyterianism
- Protestant culture

== Q ==
- Quakers

== R ==
- Radical Reformation
- Reformation
- Restorationism

== S ==
- Salvation Army, The
- Shakers

== T ==
- ten Boom, Corrie
- Trinity

== U ==
- Utraquists

== V ==
- Voegelin, Eric

== W ==
- Wesley, Charles
- Wesley, John

== Y ==
- Yehowists

== Z ==
- Zwingli, Huldrych
