= History of the Puritans =

The history of the Puritans can be traced back to the first Vestments Controversy in the reign of Edward VI, the formation of an identifiable Puritan movement in the 1560s and ends in a decline in the mid-18th century. The status of the Puritans as a religious group in England changed frequently as a result of both political shifts in their relationship to the state and the Church of England, and of changing views of Puritans. It is not typically summarised as a whole, since the political events of the 1640s, sometimes called the Puritan Revolution, have complex roots, not any more than the term "Puritan" can be given a useful and precise definition outside the particular historical context. The Puritan's main purpose was to purify the Church of England and to make England a more Christian country.

- History of the Puritans under Elizabeth I, 1558–1603
- History of the Puritans under James I, 1603–1625
- History of the Puritans under Charles I, 1625–1649
- History of the Puritans from 1649
- History of the Puritans in North America
