= Sceva =

Jewish priest in the New Testament

Sceva /ˈsiːvə/ (Ancient Greek: Σκευᾶς, romanized: Skeuas) was a Jew called a "chief priest" in Acts 19:14, although whether he was a chief priest is disputed by some writers. Although there was no high priest in Jerusalem by this name, some scholars note that it was not uncommon for some members of the Zadokite clan (Sons of Zadok) to take on an unofficial high-priestly role, which may explain this moniker. However, it is more likely that he was an itinerant exorcist based on the use of the Greek term (Ancient Greek: περιερχομένων, romanized: perierchomenōn) "going from place to place" used in Acts 19:13 in relation to his so-called "sons".

According to the book of Acts of the Apostles, he had seven sons who attempted to exorcise a demon from a man in the town of Ephesus by using the name of Jesus as an invocation. This practice is similar to the Jewish practice, originating in the Testament of Solomon, of invoking Angels to cast out demons. Because of the emphasis on healing and spiritual authority in the ministry of Sceva, it may be accurate to think of him as a Shaman figure for the Jewish communities in which he worked.
