= Multiculturalism and Christianity =

Spread of Christianity to 325 AD Spread of Christianity to 600 AD

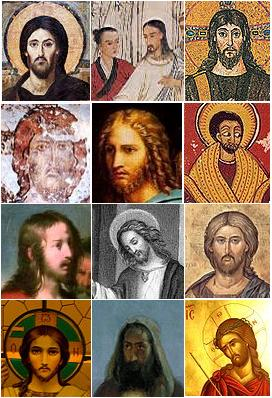
The race and appearance of Jesus has been influenced by cultural settings.

Multiculturalism and Christianity have a long historical association. Christianity originated as a sect of Judaism in the Middle East, as Jesus, the founder and central figure of Christianity, lived and held his ministry in the Middle East. Paul the Apostle, an ethnic Jew who was born and lived in the Middle East, holds such importance to Christianity that some call him the religion's "Second Founder". The greatest influence on Christianity after Paul, Augustine of Hippo, a Church Father, a Doctor of the Church, and an eminent theologian, was North African. Under the influence of Paul, Christianity soon spread widely among non-Jews (Gentiles) of the Roman Empire.

== Roman Empire ==
The Roman Emperor Galerius issued an edict permitting the practice of the Christian religion under his rule in April 311. In 313 Constantine I and Licinius announced toleration of Christianity in the Edict of Milan. Constantine would become the first Christian emperor. By 391, under the reign of Theodosius I, Christianity had become the state religion. Constantine I, the first emperor to embrace Christianity, was also the first emperor to openly promote the newly legalized religion. As the political boundaries of the Western Roman Empire diminished and then collapsed, Christianity spread beyond the old borders of the Empire and into lands that never had been Romanized.

== Age of Discovery ==
During the Age of Discovery, the Roman Catholic Church established a number of Christian mission in the Americas and other colonies in order to spread Christianity in the New World and to convert the indigenous peoples. At the same time, missionaries such as Francis Xavier as well as other Jesuits, Augustinians, Franciscans and Dominicans were moving into Asia and the Far East. The Portuguese sent missions into Africa. While some of these missions were associated with imperialism and oppression, others (notably Matteo Ricci's Jesuit mission to China) were relatively peaceful and focused on integration rather than cultural imperialism.

The most famous colonization by Protestants in the New World was that of English Puritans in North America. Unlike the Spanish or French, the English colonists made surprisingly little effort to evangelize the native peoples. The Puritans, or Pilgrims, left England so that they could live in an area with Puritanism established as the exclusive civic religion.

== World Christianity in the Modern Era ==
Christianity by country

Christianity is a religion open to all humanity that counts one out of every three people on earth among its members. The Christian world encompasses a greater area of land than that of any other religious territory. In terms of both population and geography, Christianity is the world's largest religion. As such, Christianity contains a great diversity, and has followers from a wide range of ethnicities, nationalities, and cultures. Both Europeans and non-Hispanic Whites are shrinking minorities in the Church.

=== Europe ===
In his book Enlarging the Story: Perspectives on Writing World Christian History, Richard Fox Young views the connection between Christianity and Eurocentrism as tenuous, and points to the postcolonial and non-European nature of the emerging Church and its impact on the development of World Christianity. In the postcolonial world, Christianity has lost its association with the West.

=== Outside Europe and North America ===
At the turn of the millennium, 60% of the world's two billion Christians lived in Africa, Latin America, or Asia, and by 2025, those demographics will shift to an estimated 67% of the world's three billion Christians. The rise of Christianity in the southern hemisphere, especially Africa and Latin America, in the late 20th and early 21st centuries is a "grassroots movement" that has generated new forms of Christian theology and worship, and shifted the cultural and geographic focal point of the Church away from the West. The prominence of the southern hemisphere's Christianity has brought with it a cultural and intellectual diversity to World Christianity, and contributed such ideas as Liberation theology. Immigrating minorities such as the Waldensians increased multiculturalism in areas of the United States.

== See also ==
- Christian culture
- Christianity and colonialism
- Christianity#Demographics
- Inculturation
- Major religious groups
- Missiology
- Multiculturalism
- Race and appearance of Jesus
