= Blastus =

Biblical character

According to the Bible, Blastus was the chamberlain of Herod Agrippa (Acts 12:20), a mediator for the Sidonians and Tyrians, and was believed to be involved in the events that led to Herod's death.

== Biblical account ==
According to Acts 12:20, Herod was displeased with the people of Tyre and Sidon, and forbade the export of food to them. As they were dependent on delivery of food from Judea, and Judea was affected by famine, the Sidonians and Tyrians made Blastus "their friend" (possibly through bribery). Blastus helped them obtain an audience with Herod.

Acts 12:23 states that Herod was struck dead by God when the people of Sidon and Tyre offered him worship.

== Other contemporary accounts ==
The story of Herod's death is partly corroborated by the contemporary historian Josephus. However, Josephus does not mention any involvement of Blastus.

== See also ==
- 1st century in Lebanon
- List of Biblical names starting with B
- Virgilius Maro Grammaticus
