= Mary of Rome =

Woman mentioned in the New Testament

Mary of Rome was a 1st century Christian woman mentioned in Paul the Apostle's Epistle to the Romans (16:6). She is said to have treated Paul with special kindness, and to have "laboured much among" the early Christian community.

Although it has been conjectured that she is the same person as the Mary, mother of John Mark, this is generally considered to be unproven. Most traditions hold that there is nothing more known about her.

There is also a suggestion from the Russian Orthodox tradition that Mary of Rome, is actually Mary Magdalene. Paul is not so formal as to use "of Magdalene".

Louis de Montfort - writing in his book The Secret of the Rosary - suggests that this Mary can be interpreted with Mary, mother of Jesus, when he writes:

[6] Greet Mary, who bestowed much labour on us.

KJV Romans 16:6.

== See also ==
- Mary (given name), for other notable people named Mary.
- New Testament people named Mary, for other people named Mary mentioned in the New Testament.
