= Demetrius (biblical figure) =

Name of two different Biblical characters

The name Demetrius occurs in two places in the New Testament:

- a Diana-worshipping silversmith who incited a riot against the Apostle Paul in the city of Ephesus.
- a disciple commended in 3 John 1:12. Possibly the bearer of the letters of 1, 2 and 3 John, Demetrius is commended to the early Christian leader Gaius (3 John 1:11) as one who upholds the truth of the Gospel, and as such should be welcomed and provided for.

== See also ==
- Demetrius
