= Nicodemus ben Gurion =

Figure in the Talmud and the New Testament

Nicodemus ben Gurion (Hebrew: נַקְדִּימוֹן בֶּן־גּוּרְיוֹן, romanized: Naqdīmōn ben-Gūriōn), also called Buni (Hebrew: בּוּנִי, romanized: Būnī) was a wealthy Jewish man who lived in Jerusalem in the 1st century AD. He is believed by some scholars to be the Nicodemus mentioned in the Gospel of John. Elsewhere he is discussed in Josephus' history, The Jewish War, and later, rabbinic works: Lamentations Rabbah, Ecclesiastes Rabbah, the Babylonian Talmud, and Avot of Rabbi Natan.

== Name ==
Ben Gurion means "son of Gurion", the Hebrew patronymic, his personal name was apparently either Buni or Bunai. He acquired the nickname Nicodemus, meaning "victory of the people" (from νίκη and δῆμος), or alternate Semitic etymology Naqdimon, signifying "to break through" (from Hebrew: קדר or נקד) because of a miraculous answer to a prayer he made ("the sun broke through for him"). or by some editions and later rabbis, came before or stood (קדם), in relation to the sun, And since it's closer to the name and appears in relation to the miracle directly after the previous explanation, and in another passage relating to this miracle, this is the one used the most. Some argue the name Nicodemus in the Bible to be a Hellenization of the Hebrew and Aramaic name Naqdimon, while others consider the latter to be of a folk etymology.

== Biography ==
Nicodemus appears to have been a wealthy and respected figure, known for his holiness and generosity. He was an opponent of the Zealots and of the Jewish rebellion against the Roman Empire. When Vespasian became emperor, Nicodemus sought peace with the emperor's son Titus, who was conducting the war. He agitated against the prosecution of the war by the Zealots. In retaliation, they destroyed the stores of provisions that he and his friends had accumulated for the use of pilgrims.
