= Epaphras =

Observer of the apostle Paul

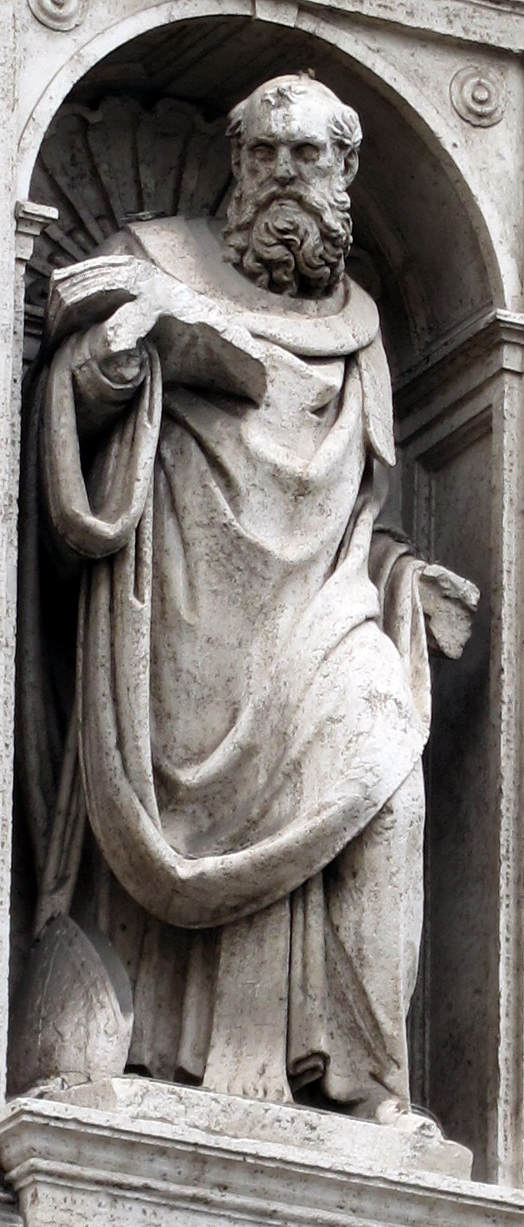
- Epaphras
- Attributes: Christian Martyrdom

Epaphras (Greek: Ἐπαφρᾶς) was an observer of the Apostle Paul mentioned twice in the New Testament epistle of Colossians and once in the New Testament letter to Philemon.

== Analysis ==
Douglas Moo, in his commentary on Colossians, writes this about Epaphras: "Little is known about him, though we can infer that he was a native of Colossae and that he was perhaps converted by Paul himself during the apostle's ministry in Ephesus. The mention of a co-worker at this point in a Pauline epistle is unusual, and the strength of Paul's endorsement of him is also striking (note also 4:12-13)."
