= Coronation of the Byzantine emperor =

Symbolic act of accession to the throne

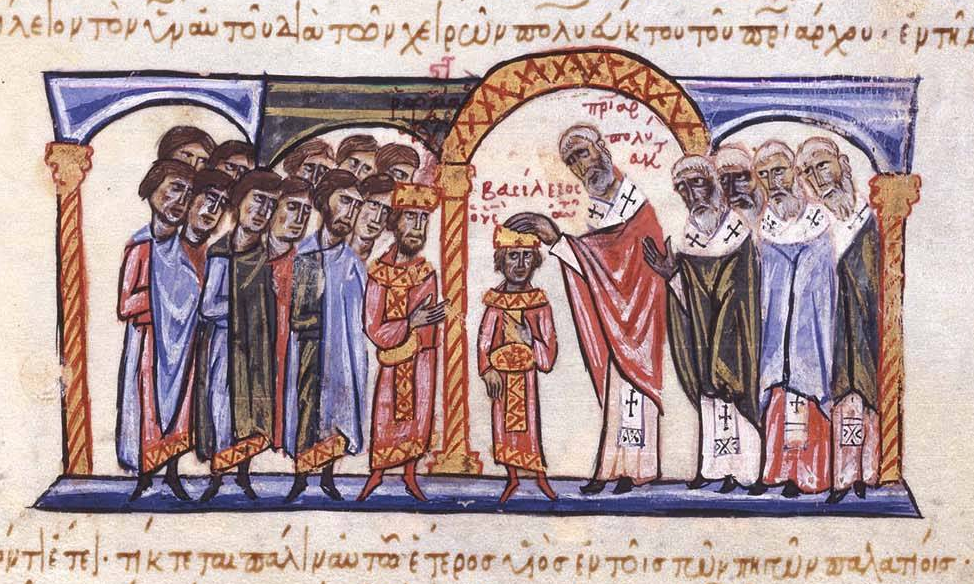
Miniature from the Madrid Skylitzes showing the coronation of Basil II as co-emperor by his father, Romanos II and Patriarch Polyeuktos (who puts on the crown), in the presence of the clergy (right) and the court dignitaries (left).

The coronation (Greek: στέψιμον, romanized: stépsimon, or στεφάνωσις, stephánosis) was the main symbolic act of accession to the throne of a Byzantine emperor, co-emperor, or empress. Founded on Roman traditions of election by the Senate or acclamation by the army, the ceremony evolved over time from a relatively simple, ad hoc affair to a complex ritual.

In the 5th–6th centuries the coronation became gradually standardized, with the new emperor appearing before the people and army at the Hippodrome of Constantinople, where he was crowned and acclaimed. During the same time, religious elements, notably the presence of the patriarch of Constantinople, became prominent in what was previously a purely military or civilian ceremony. From the early 7th century on, the coronation ceremony usually took place in a church, chiefly the Hagia Sophia, the patriarchal cathedral of Constantinople. The association of the coronation ceremony with Constantinople and the Hagia Sophia became so close that even emperors who had been proclaimed, and crowned, outside the capital as military rebels or usurpers, usually repeated their coronation in the capital once they had won power.

The ritual was apparently standardized by the end of the 8th century, and changed little afterwards. It involved the homage of the Senate, a procession to the Hagia Sophia and the distribution of largess to the people. A special coronation service was held, for which the emperor or empress to be crowned changed into coronation dress inside the church. The act of coronation was carried out by the patriarch, except when a ruling emperor crowned a co-ruler or his wife. Either before or after the act of coronation, the emperors received the acclamation of the dignitaries, the troops and the people. The main change in the ceremony was the addition of the emperor's unction in the early 13th century, likely under Western European influence, although this is disputed by scholars; and the revival of the late antique practice of carrying the emperor on a shield in the 1250s. The Byzantine coronation ritual influenced other Eastern Orthodox states, notably Russia, and is a frequent subject of Byzantine art, where rulers are shown as receiving their crown directly from Christ, the Theotokos, or angels.

== History of the Byzantine coronation ceremonial ==
=== Theory and practice of imperial accessions ===
In the Roman Empire, accession to the throne was never regulated in a formal manner. In theory, current since the time of Augustus and later formalized in aspects of the Byzantine coronation ceremony, the office of Roman emperor was elective, and the emperor was chosen by the Roman people, the Senate, and the army. The aim was to choose the "best man", but the reality of imperial accessions rarely fitted the idealized theory; as a result, irregular accessions to the throne were retroactively justified as a manifestation of divine favour.

The idea of selecting the "best man" was espoused especially by the Senate, and the continuing Republican tradition of the senatorial aristocracy demanded that a new emperor be chosen by the Senate at Rome. The foundation of the Roman imperial power, however, was the supreme command over the army, embodied in the title of imperator, originally given to the triumphant generals of the Republic. As such, the emperors were frequently chosen by the army in the provinces, with the Senate deprived of any role in the process. Senatorial consent was still required as a matter of form, however, and many emperors who had been proclaimed in the provinces visited Rome to receive it.

Already from the earliest days of the Roman Empire, during the Principate, several ruling emperors were able to designate their own successors, usually a close relative by blood or adoption, but the principle of a dynastic succession was never enshrined in law. The road always remained open for usurpers to successfully claim the throne, provided they were acclaimed by the common people or the army, which signalled their consent. The fact that a usurper—usually an army officer—could successfully install himself on the throne and become accepted as a legitimate emperor led modern historians to describe the government of the later Roman Empire as "absolutism tempered by the right of revolution", in the words of Byzantinist Peter Charanis.

This pattern continued in the Eastern Roman or Byzantine Empire. During the early Byzantine period (324–610), the army provided 12 emperors, while only nine came from the ruling imperial family. This began to change during the social transformations of the so-called "Byzantine Dark Ages" of the 7th–8th centuries, which enhanced the principle of dynastic legitimacy, exemplified by the creation of the highly prestigious epithet porphyrogennetos (lit. 'purple-born') for children born to reigning emperors. Dynastic succession became more and more common, until it prevailed completely under the Komnenos and Palaiologos dynasties of the late Byzantine era.

=== Election and acclamation ceremonies in the Roman Empire ===
Due to the irregular nature of imperial accessions, no fixed ceremonial emerged during the Roman Empire. The only constant part of any imperial accession was the acclamation by the Senate, people and the army, which signalled the consent of the ruled; during the Principate, this ritual act of consent was often repeated annually by vows (vota) taken to the emperor on the anniversary (natalis) of his accession. Over the centuries the act of acclamation became increasingly formalized and scripted, but remained a key symbol of popular consent, and hence of an emperor's legitimacy.

During the Principate, apart from the actual act of the election or acclamation, the ceremony of accession only included the conferment of the usual imperial insignia, chiefly the general's cloak (paludamentum or chlamys) of imperial purple, which hearkened back to the traditions of the triumphant imperator. Starting with Claudius (r. 41–54), the accession was followed by the issuing of a donative to the soldiers, either as a reward for their loyalty, or as an outright bribe for their support. From the time of Constantine the Great (r. 306–337) on, following ancient Near Eastern tradition, a diadem was adopted as a sign of the openly monarchical power the imperial office had assumed during the Dominate. However, unlike the ancient Near Eastern monarchies, no coronation ceremony appears to have been adopted at this point. During the Dominate, the ceremony of the arrival (adventus) of a victorious emperor was sometimes employed as a symbol of an imperial accession, although it was an occasion celebrated throughout an emperor's reign as well.

The first evidence of a coronation ceremony is recorded during the acclamation of Julian in 361: the soldiers raised the new emperor on a shield, proclaimed him Augustus, and crowned him with a standard-bearer's neck torc in lieu of a diadem, since he had none. The custom of raising on a shield, borrowed from the Germanic peoples, remained frequent for military usurpers until Phocas (r. 602–610), but fell out of use thereafter. A more formalized version of the same procedure was observed for the coronation of Valentinian at Ancyra in 364. After he was elected by the army's leaders, Valentinian mounted a tribunal in front of the assembled troops, was clad in the imperial vestments and diadem, and proclaimed by the soldiers as Augustus. He then addressed the troops, promising them a donative. A similar procedure was followed in 367, when Valentinian crowned his son, Gratian, as co-emperor.

=== Early period, 5th–6th centuries ===
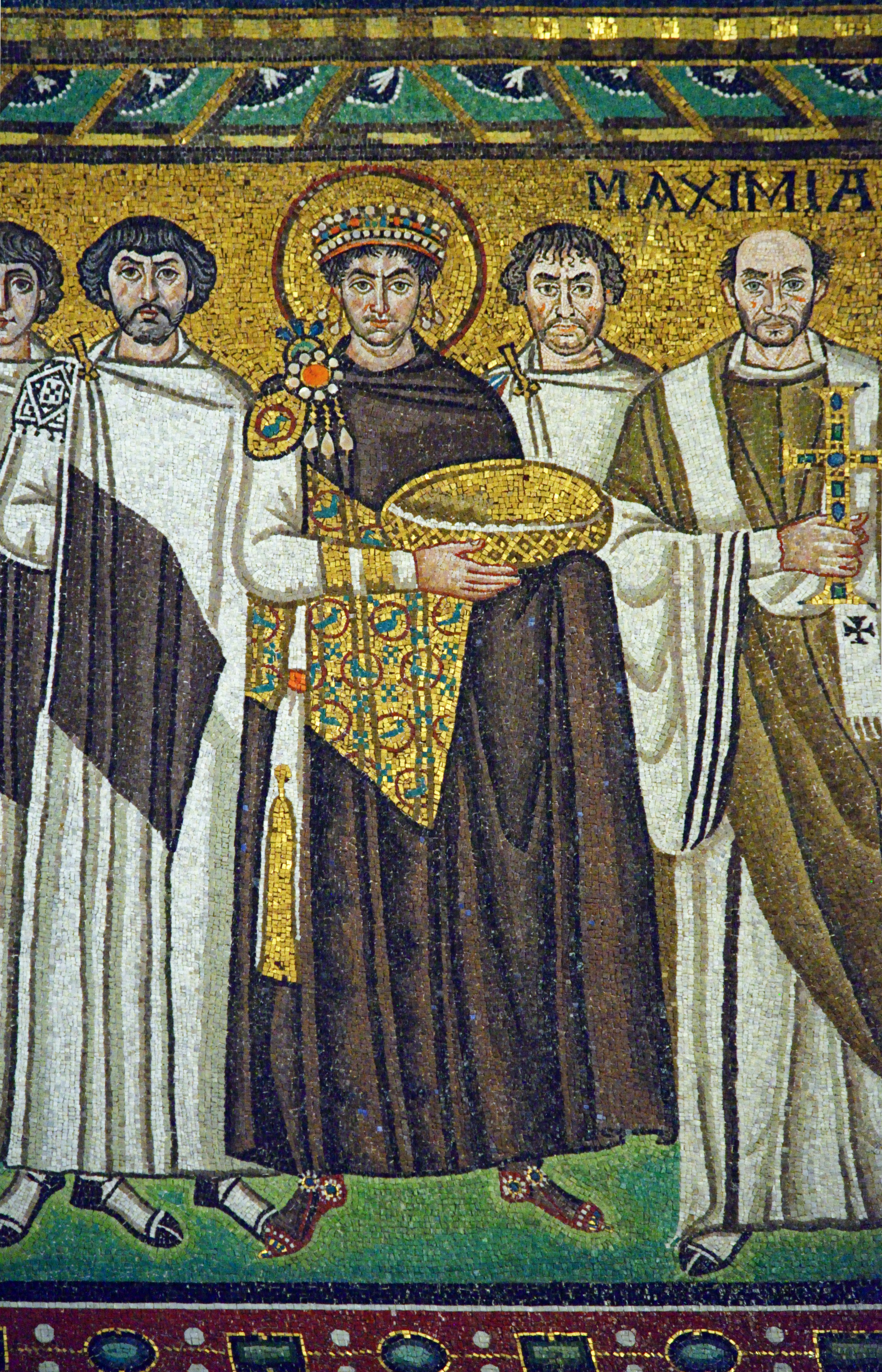
Mosaic of Emperor Justinian I in coronation dress, Basilica of San Vitale, Ravenna

Marcian was proclaimed by the army at the Hebdomon in 450. The next coronation ceremony recorded is that of Leo I the Thracian, in 457. The coronations of Leo I, Leo II (473), Anastasius I Dicorus (491), Justin I (518) and Justinian I (525) are described in the 10th-century De Ceremoniis by Emperor Constantine VII Porphyrogennetos (r. 913–959), copied from an earlier work ascribed to the 6th-century official Peter the Patrician; in addition, the ceremony for Justin II (565) is recounted in considerable detail in Corippus' laudatory poem De laudibus Iustini minoris.

When an emperor was chosen for a vacant throne, the selection of the new ruler fell to the senior court officials (such as the magister officiorum and the comes excubitorum) and the Senate, which comprised the most senior dignitaries and ex-officials, those with the highest senatorial rank of vir illustris. After the death of Zeno in 491, the officials delegated their authority to the reigning empress-dowager, the Augusta Ariadne, who chose Anastasius I. Their choice had to be assented to by the soldiers of the palace regiments, and was finally approved by acclamation by the populace of Constantinople at the public coronation ceremony in the Hippodrome of Constantinople. Whereas emperors raised to a vacant throne were thus elected by the Senate and the army, with the sanction of the people, co-emperors were selected by the reigning emperor, and although the Senate may have been consulted, the choice was ultimately the ruling sovereign's. Although this was in effect a dynastic choice, the new emperor's right to the throne derived not from his birth, but by the will of his predecessor.

==== Coronation of Leo I ====
The coronation of Leo I took place in Campus Martius in Hebdomon, a suburb of Constantinople outside the city walls. It was otherwise nearly identical to the ceremony used by Valentinian: Leo mounted a tribunal and as crowned with a torc by the army's drill master (campiductor); the standards were raised and Leo was acclaimed by the soldiers as God-crowned Augustus; he donned the imperial cloak and diadem, and took a lance and a shield; the officials came to pay homage (proskynesis) according to their rank; and an official addressed the troops on the new emperor's behalf, promising them the customary donative.

In stark contrast to the purely military affair of Valentinian's acclamation, the coronation of Leo I was a civilian matter: the Senate ratified his nomination, and the new emperor received the crown. The Patriarch of Constantinople, Anatolius, was present, but did not play any role in the proceedings, in contrast to his successors. Julian's coronation with the torc, originally an ad hoc necessity, had now been revived and institutionalized as a deliberate act, which was followed in subsequent coronations as well.

Following his coronation, Leo prayed at the Church of the Papilion and the Church of St. John the Baptist, where he offered his crown at the altar. After he put the crown back on his head, he proceeded to Constantinople on horseback. At the Helenianai Palace, he was enrobed in the imperial garbs and rode in a chariot across the city. A "foremost patrician", likely Aspar, accompanied him in the chariot. They got off the vehicle at the Forum of Constantine where a "leading senator", also probably Aspar, offered Leo a golden crown. When Leo visited the patriarchal cathedral of Hagia Sophia, he deposited his crown upon the altar, and as he left the church, the patriarch placed the crown on his head.

At the Great Palace, he was met by the senators and the comites of the palace guards. There, he granted financial favors to the senators and was escorted by patricians into his quarters.

==== Ceremonial of the 5th–6th centuries ====
After Leo I, the ceremonies described in the sources took place at the Hippodrome, except for Justinian I and Justin II. Justinian was crowned and acclaimed entirely in the Delphax hall of the Great Palace. Justin II was also crowned and acclaimed inside the palace, largely in the presence of the senate rather than the army, but performed another acclamation in the Hippodrome in front of the populace.

The ceremonies of the period shared broad similarities:

===== Arrival at the Hippodrome =====
Once the election was affirmed by the Senate, the new emperor proceeded from the Great Palace directly to the imperial box (kathisma) in the adjacent Hippodrome via a covered passage, in the company of the patriarch and other high dignitaries. In case of the coronation of a co-emperor (Leo II and Justinian I), the emperor then called for the magister officiorum and the patrikioi to bring the new co-emperor. When this was done, the new co-emperor was seated on the reigning emperor's left, and the patriarch on his right. The new emperor was dressed in a knee-length white tunic (divetesion) with gold clavi, girded with a gold and gem-encrusted belt (zonarin); purple stockings and gaiters (touvia); and the crimson imperial buskins (kampagia), embroidered with gold and decorated with rosettes.

===== Raising on a shield =====
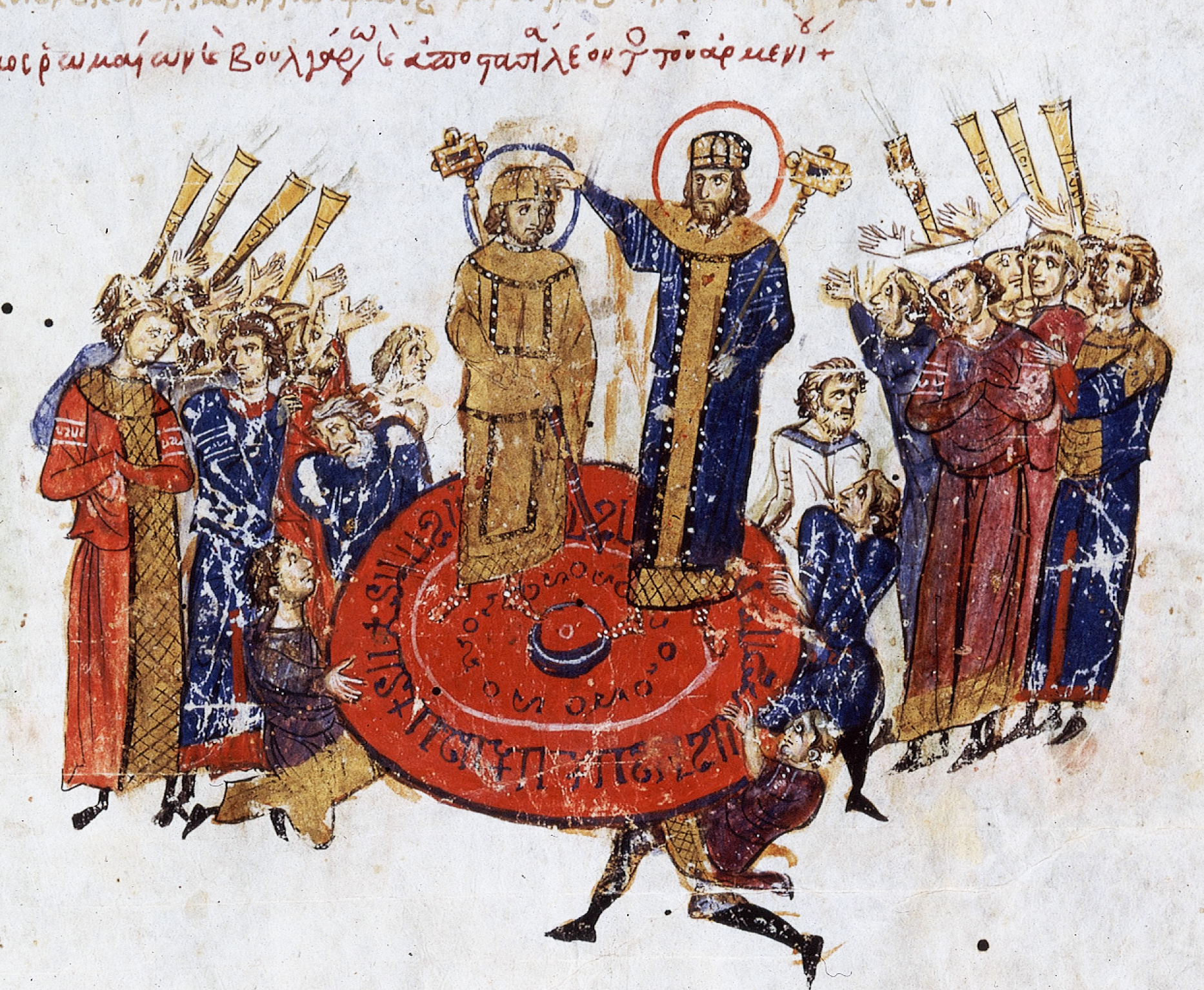
Anachronistic depiction of a coronation by being raised on a shield, from the Madrid Skylitzes. The crowned figure is meant to be Michael I Rhangabe, although there is some debate concerning the identity of the two figures, as the scene appears to be drawn from a lost original source. It has been proposed that the image depicts the coronation of a co-emperor (left) by a senior emperor (right).

Emperors acceding to a vacant throne were raised on a shield and crowned with a torc by a campiductor, whereupon the military standards were raised and the emperor acclaimed. The raising on the shield was not used in Leo I's accession, but was performed for the emperor Anastasius I in 491, the usurper Hypatius during the Nika Riots, and emperor Justin II in 565. In addition, this ritual featured in the succession dispute following the death of Anastasius, and before Justin I emerged as the preferred candidate. The imperial bodyguard of the Excubitors raised a tribune named John on a shield, but he was opposed by the Blues faction and stoned; likewise, the Scholae Palatinae troops tried to raise their own candidate, a magister militum, to the throne and proclaimed him atop a table in the palace, before they were attacked by the Excubitors and their candidate killed.

===== Coronation with the diadem =====
After the acclamation, the new emperor assumed the remainder of the imperial garb, namely the purple, ankle-length cloak, decorated with a golden square (tablion) and fastened by a bejeweled fibula clasp. The patriarch said a prayer, and the emperor was crowned with the diadem, which by the 6th century had evolved to an elaborate gem-encrusted circlet. This type of dress is exemplified by the well-known mosaic of Justinian I at the Basilica of San Vitale in Ravenna. When co-emperors were crowned by a reigning emperor, as in the case of Leo II, the diadem was emplaced by the latter; otherwise it was the patriarch who placed the diadem on the new emperor. In the case of the coronation of Anastasius I, he retired from the Hippodrome to a nearby hall in the Great Palace for this part of the ceremony, while Leo I and Justin I were crowned with the diadem in the Hippodrome, but covered by the soldiers' shields.

===== Acclamation and imperial address =====
The newly crowned emperor returned to the kathisma, and, bearing a shield and lance, was acclaimed by the people as Augustus. Unlike Leo I, the later emperors were hailed as Augustus only after the formal coronation by the patriarch, rather than after the first acclamation following the raising on the shield.

A secretary (libellensis) then addressed the assembled people and army in the name of the new emperor, a speech which included the promise of a donative. Invariably, that was the same amount as Julian had promised: five gold pieces and a pound of silver to each man.

===== Aftermath =====
Anastasius' coronation also records that he immediately went to the Hagia Sophia, where he took off his diadem in the metatorion (a chamber or series of chambers in the cathedral's upper story) and gave it to the praepositus sacri cubiculi. The latter then returned the diadem to the emperor, who deposited it in the church's altar, and made rich gifts to the church. While the post-coronation stop at Hagia Sophia is only explicitly mentioned for Tiberius II amongst other emperors of the period, the practice was probably continued until the coronation itself began to be performed in the Hagia Sophia.

=== Middle period, 7th–12th centuries ===
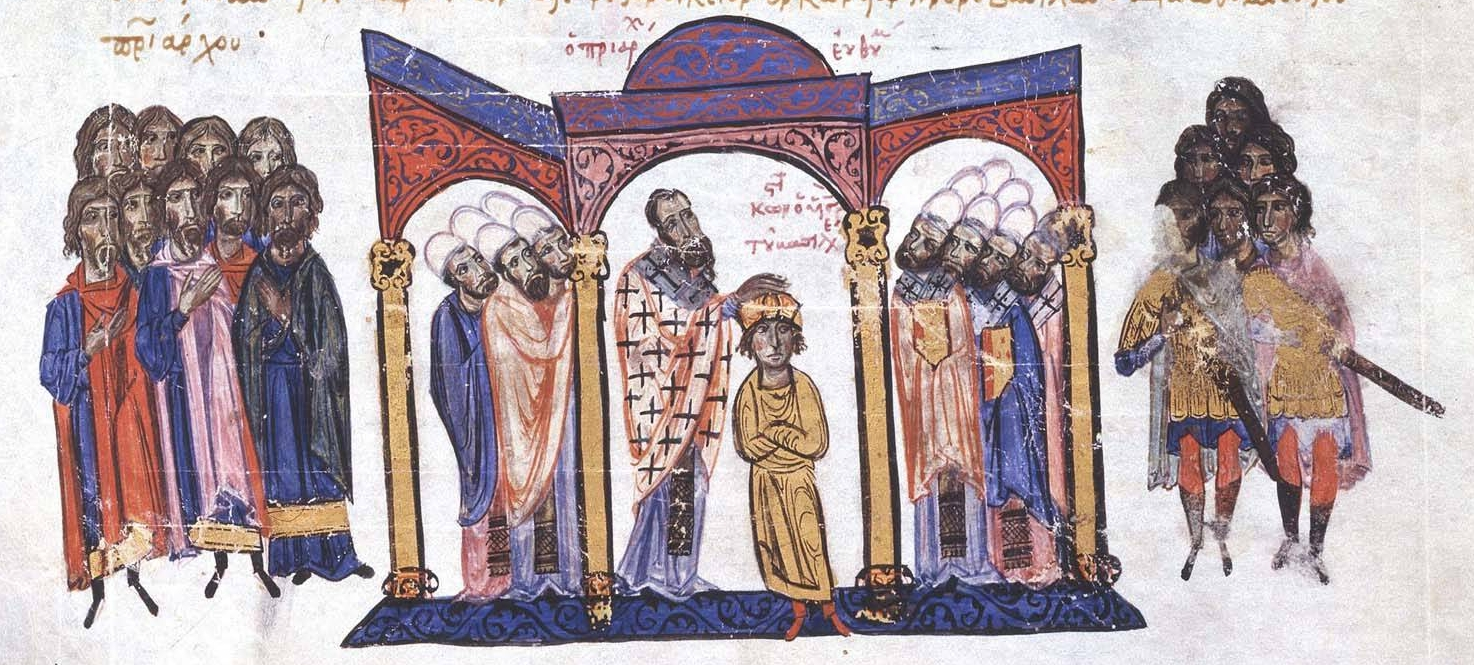
The coronation of the young Constantine VII Porphyrogennetos as Byzantine co-emperor in 908. Miniature from the Madrid Skylitzes chronicle. c. 12th–13th century

The middle period is characterized by the move of the coronation to churches, and the gradual formalization and definition of the ceremony and the associated ecclesiastical rite. Coronations in churches were inaugurated with Phocas in 602, who was crowned by Patriarch Cyriacus at the church of St. John at Hebdomon, on the outskirts of Constantinople. In 610, Heraclius was crowned by the Patriarch Sergius I at the church of St. Philip in the palace precinct, and in 638, Heraclius crowned his son Heraklonas co-emperor at the church of St. Stephen in the Daphne Palace. From Constans II in 641 on, however, most senior emperors were crowned in the Hagia Sophia. The only exceptions were co-emperors, who were sometimes crowned in the Great Palace (Constantine V in 720) or the Hippodrome (Constantine VI in 776). Empresses were often crowned during the same ceremony as their husbands, or had been crowned along with their fathers; otherwise they were usually crowned in one of the halls of the Great Palace, or at the church of St. Stephen of Daphne.

The ceremonial of the 7th and 8th centuries is unknown, as no detailed description of a coronation has survived. However, by the late 8th century, a specific ecclesiastical rite had emerged. First recorded in the patriarchal euchologion (liturgical book) of c. 795, the liturgy appears to have remained unaltered until the 12th century. In addition to the church liturgy, Constantine VII's De Ceremoniis (I.38–50) contains detailed information about the coronation ceremony itself, though not the entire inauguration ceremony (ἀναγόρευσις).

At the same time, the raising on a shield appears to have been abandoned. Phocas was raised on the shield by the Danube army when they mutinied and proclaimed him emperor, but not as part of his actual coronation in Constantinople. The practice is no longer mentioned thereafter, and is notably missing in both the De Ceremoniis and the euchologia. Constantine VII only writes of the practice as a custom of the Khazars. The only exceptions to this, until the 13th century when the practice was revived, were the 11th-century rebels Peter Delyan and Leo Tornikios.

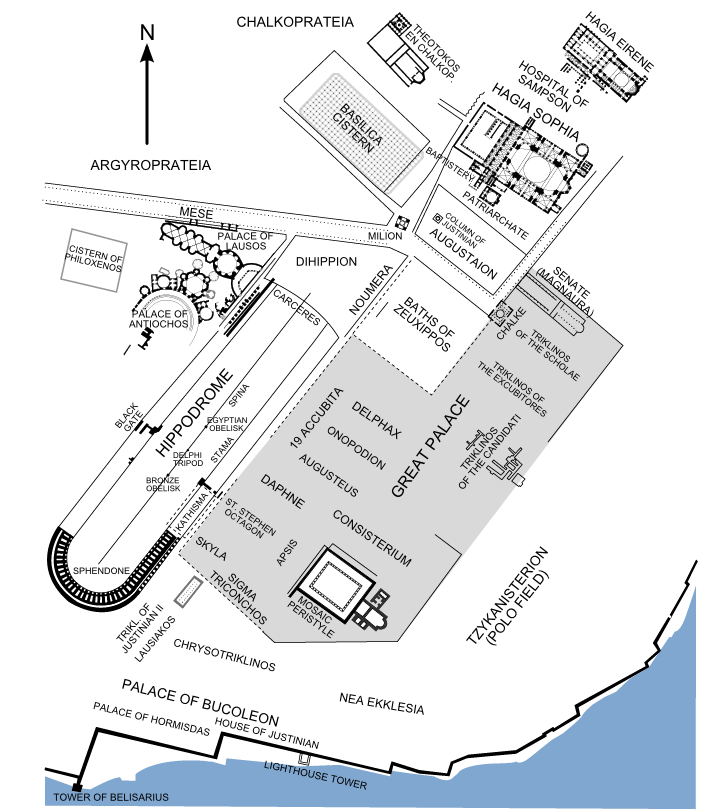
Map of the ceremonial heart of Constantinople: the Great Palace complex, the Hippodrome, and the Hagia Sophia. The structures of the Great Palace are shown in their approximate position as derived from literary sources. Surviving structures are in black.

==== Procession through the Great Palace and homage of the Senate ====
The emperor, dressed in the skaramangion tunic and the sagion cloak, began his coronation procession at the Hall of the Augusteus in the Great Palace, escorted by the eunuch officials of the privy chamber, the kouboukleion, headed by the praipositoi. At the Onopodion hall, the assembled patrikioi awaited him and wished him 'many and good years'. They then proceeded to the hall of the Grand Consistory, where the rest of the senators were assembled. There the patrikioi and the rest of the senators performed the proskynesis to the emperors, and again wished them 'many and good years'. Passing through the hall of the Scholae, where the racing factions, dressed in ceremonial dress, stood and made the sign of the cross.

==== Distribution of coins ====
The imperial procession then exited the Great Palace and crossed the Augustaion square to the Hagia Sophia in a formal procession, scattering coins to the crowd, perhaps an evolution of the donative. This does not appear in Constantine VII's work.

==== Donning the coronation dress ====
Arriving at the Horologion hall of the Hagia Sophia, the emperor changed clothes, putting on the divetesion tunic (now a much more richly embroidered and stiff tunic than its late antique namesake) and the tzitzakion mantle, and re-donning the sagion over them.

Accompanied by the patriarch, he entered the main church via the Silver Doors, lighting tapers on the way, proceeded to the holy doors of the sanctuary, where he made his devotions and lighted more tapers.

==== Coronation ====
The emperor, again accompanied by the patriarch, mounted the ambo, where the crown and the imperial purple cloak (chlamys) had been deposited.

The emperor bowed his head, while the deacon of the Hagia Sophia recited a litany (ektenia). At the same time, the patriarch silently performed the Prayer over the chlamys. After ending the prayer, the patriarch took the chlamys, handing it and the fibula clasp over to the members of the kouboukleion, who proceeded to dress the emperor with it. In case of the coronation of a co-emperor or an empress, the patriarch instead gave the chlamys to the emperor, who invested them with the help of the praipositoi.

The patriarch then recited the Prayer over the crown, before taking the crown in both hands and crowning the emperor with it, while proclaiming 'In the name of the Father, and of the Son, and of the Holy Ghost'. The assembled audience responded with 'Holy, holy, holy' and 'Glory to God in the highest and on earth peace' thrice. In the case of a co-emperor's or empress' coronation, the patriarch took a second crown, gave it to the emperor, who then crowned the new co-ruler, while the choirs shouted 'worthy!'.

==== Acclamations and homage of the dignitaries ====
The emperor (and co-emperors) then received the sacraments from the patriarch, after which the various military standards, standing on either side, were lowered, and the senators and choirs, bow in adoration of the emperors.

A series of ritualized laudatory acclamations followed, praising God and the emperor(s). These included the polychronion ('Many years to so-and-so, great emperor and sovereign!').

The emperor, wearing the crown, then moved to sit on the throne (sella), and the various dignitaries came and paid homage to him by performing the proskynesis and kissing his knees, in groups of twelve, by order of precedence: first the magistroi, then the patrikioi and strategoi, then the protospatharioi, and so on down to the subaltern officers of the tagmata regiments and the Imperial Fleet.

Constantine VII's description is at odds with the euchologia, since he implies that a regular mass "according to the custom of festivals" followed after the homage, rather than before, but this may simply be the result of his assuming that the coronation ceremony takes place on a religious festival, whereas the euchologia do not. Indeed, while most new emperors were crowned as soon as possible, festival or no, the coronations of co-emperors or empresses, a specific festival day was chosen.

In case an empress was crowned separately from her husband, almost the identical ceremony was followed, but the crown was imposed on her head by the patriarch rather than the emperor.

=== Late period, 13th–15th centuries ===
This period is characterized by the addition of the unction of the new emperor. This was a feature of coronation rituals in Western Europe from the 7th century, but is not explicitly recorded in Byzantine sources until after 1204. Another feature of the period was the revival of the ancient practice of raising the emperor on a shield as part of the ceremony. First mentioned under Theodore I's grandson, Theodore II Laskaris (r. 1254–1258), it is likely that it had been revived already by Theodore I. The practice was institutionalized for all subsequent coronations, with the new emperor—sitting, rather than standing, on the shield—being raised on a shield held by the patriarch and other dignitaries before he entered the Hagia Sophia to be anointed and crowned. Under the Empire of Nicaea, co-emperors were not crowned, but this was resumed by the Palaiologos dynasty.

The Hagia Sophia cathedral in Constantinople (modern Istanbul) was the main coronation church of the Byzantine emperors, from the mid-7th century to the end of the Empire

Chapter VII of Pseudo-Kodinos' work provides a full description of the Palaiologan-era coronation ritual. A less detailed description is also included in the History (I.41) of John VI Kantakouzenos, while the De Sacro Templo of Symeon of Thessalonica discusses the religious elements of the ceremony from a theological point of view. Unlike for the middle Byzantine period, no source survives for the actual prayers and hymns used during the ceremony, but it can be assumed that the prayers at least had not changed much from the previous era.

According to Pseudo-Kodinos, the person to be crowned spent the night prior to the coronation at the Great Palace, along with his familiars and the court dignitaries. This is exceptional, since the Great Palace at the time was no longer the main residence of the emperors, which had moved to the Palace of Blachernae in the northwestern corner of the city in the late 11th century; the Great Palace does not otherwise figure among the ceremonies in Pseudo-Kodinos' work. At dawn on the next day, the imperial relatives, aristocracy, and officials assembled at the Augustaion, the square between the Great Palace and the Hagia Sophia, along with the populace of Constantinople and the army.

==== Coronation oath ====
At the "second hour" (mid-way between dawn and mid-morning) of the coronation day, the emperor went to the Hagia Sophia, where he handed over to the patriarch a hand-written coronation oath. It began with a pledge of adherence to the Orthodox doctrine and canon law (Pseudo-Kodinos provides a full text, including the Nicene Creed), a promise to respect the privileges of the Church, and to govern with justice and benevolence. The same was repeated orally before the patriarch.

==== Distribution of largesse ====
At the same time, a specially chosen senator—i.e., a holder of a court title or office —mounted the steps of the Augustaion square and began distributing coins to the assembled populace, in the form of small packages (epikombia) with three gold, three silver, and three bronze coins.

==== Raising on a shield and acclamation ====
After delivering the pledge to the patriarch, the emperor left the Hagia Sophia and went to the hall (triklinos) known as the Thomaites, one of the sections of the patriarchal palace which extended along the eastern side of the Augustaion and was connected to the south gallery of the Hagia Sophia. There he was raised on a shield and thus displayed to those assembled in the Augustaion. The front of the shield was carried by the senior emperor (in case of a co-emperor's coronation) and the patriarch, and behind them were imperial relatives or high officials, from the despots down. Following the acclamations of people and army, the new emperor was lowered and returned to the Hagia Sophia.

==== Donning the coronation dress ====
Upon entering the cathedral, the emperor changed his clothes in a specially constructed small wooden chamber (equivalent to the earlier metatorion), donning the imperial tunic (sakkos) and the loros, after they were first blessed by bishops. His head was left bare, but he could wear a simplified circlet (stephanos) or "anything else he might think fit".

After exiting the chamber, the new emperor (and his father, the senior emperor, depending on the occasion) mounted a wooden platform, constructed next to the chamber and covered in red silk, whereupon a set of special gold thrones of particular height was erected. The emperors sat on the thrones along with their wives. If the empresses had already been crowned, they wore their crown, otherwise the new empress also wore a stephanos.

==== Unction ====
In the meantime, the patriarch conducted the liturgy. Before the trisagion hymn, he and other church dignitaries mounted the ambo. Then the liturgy was interrupted and the church fell silent, whereupon the patriarch summoned the emperors to him. The emperor ascended the ambo from the western side, i.e., towards the patriarch recited the prayers for the unction of the emperor. On completion of the prayer, the new emperor removed his headdress, immediately followed by the entire congregation, which stood up. The patriarch proceeded to anoint the new emperor, shouting "holy!", which is echoed thrice by the congregation.

==== Coronation ====
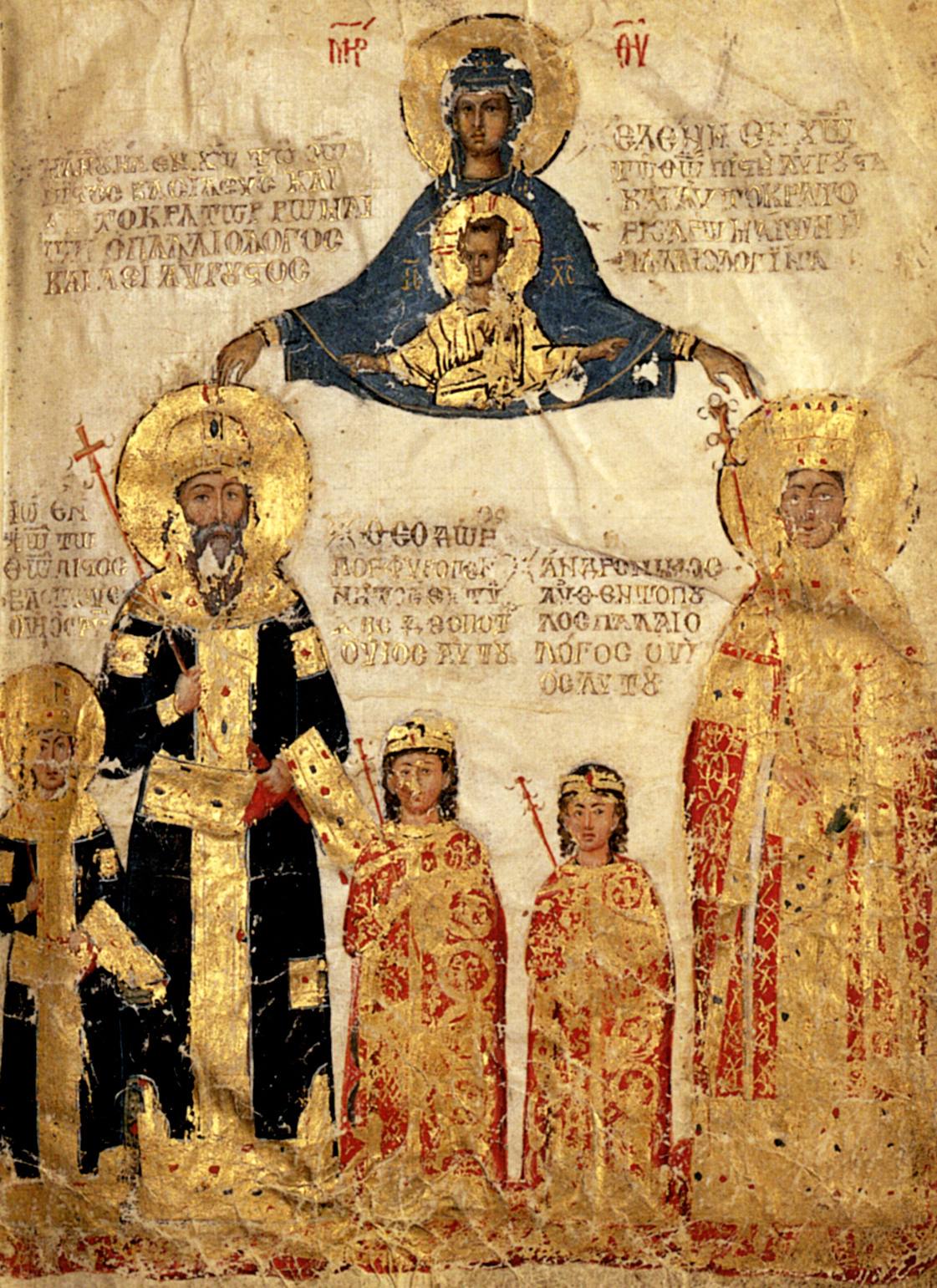
Miniature of Manuel II Palaiologos, Empress Helena Dragash, and their sons—the co-emperor John VIII, the despot Theodore, and the despot Andronikos—in coronation dress

The crown, which until that point in the ceremony was kept in the sanctuary by the deacons, was then brought to the ambo. The patriarch took it in his hands and placed it on the head of the new emperor, proclaiming him 'worthy' (axios), which again is echoed thrice by the congregation. The patriarch recited another prayer, and the new emperor descended the ambo from the eastern staircase (towards the sanctuary).

If the new emperor had a consort, she was crowned at this point. The consort stood up from the platform, where the imperial family sat, and went to the soleas, a walkway connecting the ambo to the sanctuary. She was held on either side by two close relatives or, failing that, two court eunuchs. After being himself crowned, the new emperor took the empress' crown—likewise held by two relatives or eunuchs, and blessed by the patriarch—from the patriarch's hands, descended the stairs, and crowned her. The new empress immediately performed the proskynesis in sign of submission, and the patriarch read another prayer for the imperial couple and their subjects. Otherwise, if a consort married an already crowned emperor, she was crowned during the marriage ceremony in a similar procedure.

==== Great Entrance ====
After the coronation, both emperor and empress mounted the imperial platform and sat on their thrones, the emperor holding a cross and the empress a baion (a gilded staff decorated with pearls and gems in the shape of a palm branch). The imperial couple remained seated in the rest of the liturgy, except when the trisagion was sung or the Epistles and Gospels read.

When the hymns to the Great Entrance began, the senior deacons summoned the emperor and brought him to the prothesis. There he put a golden mantle (mandyas) over his other clothing, and on his left hand he took a staff (the narthex), while on the right he still held the cross. Both the golden mantle and the staff signified his ecclesiastical rank as depotatos. Thus dressed, the emperor led the Great Entrance procession around the nave, flanked on either side by a hundred "axe-bearing Varangians" and a hundred young armed noblemen, and followed by the clergy carrying the sacred ornaments and offerings. The procession ended when the emperor arrived at the soleas. While the others remained behind, the emperor alone went on to meet the patriarch at the holy doors. The two bowed their heads in greeting, whereupon the second deacon, with the censer in his right hand and the patriarchal omophorion in the other, censed the emperor, and, while the latter bowed his head, exclaimed, "May the Lord God remember in his kingdom the reign of your Majesty, always, now and forever and unto the ages of ages. Amen", echoed by all the other deacons and priests. The same was repeated for the patriarch, and then the emperor removed the golden mantle, assisted by the referendarios (the patriarch's messenger to the emperor), and returned to the platform with the rest of his family.

==== Communion ====
The emperor remained at the platform, seated except for the recitations of the Nicene Creed, the Lord's Prayer, and the Elevation. Following the Elevation, if the emperor was not prepared to commune, he sat down until the end of the liturgy.

If the emperor wanted to partake of the communion, the principal deacons summoned him to the sanctuary. Taking a censer, he censed the altar crosswise, and then censed the patriarch. The latter saluted the emperor, took the censer, and in turn censed the emperor. Then the emperor removed his crown and handed it to the deacons.

The communion of the emperor took place in the manner reserved for the clergy: at some point in the 13th/14th centuries, the practice was established that the laity began receiving the communion (consecrated bread and wine) mixed together in a chalice from a spoon, but the emperor and clergy retained the older practice of receiving the bread and wine separately. The patriarch, after communicating himself, communicated the emperor, delivering a piece of the bread into his hands; and after communicating in the chalice, the patriarch likewise communicated the emperor, holding the chalice while the emperor drank from it. The emperor then put on his crown again and exited the sanctuary.

==== Departure and aftermath ====
At the end of the liturgy, the emperor received the bread known as antidoron with the rest of the congregation. He was then blessed by the patriarch and the bishops, kissed their hands, and went to the gallery reserved for the catechumens, where a wooden platform was erected, with "ordinary" thrones and hidden from view with gold curtains. The new emperor and empress (and, if living, the emperor's father and mother) ascended the platform while hidden from view. The cantors then cried "raise, raise" ("anateilate, anateilate"), and the curtains were raised, showing the imperial party to those assembled in the gallery of the catechumens, who acclaim the emperors.

After the acclamation was finished, the imperial party descended from the platform, and led the procession to the Great Palace. The emperors and empresses, wearing their crowns, were mounted, while the rest of the dignitaries proceeded on foot. Pseudo-Kodinos notes that the emperors' horses used to be decorated with covers around the neck and hind quarters (chaiomata), and red silk streamers above their fetlocks (toubia), but that in Pseudo-Kodinos' time, the former were no longer used. The imperial party was preceded by lances with wooden rings, decorated with red and white silk streamers, whose bearers were singing as they went. During the coronation liturgy, three of these lances were located on either side of the two choir platforms erected on either side of the nave of the Hagia Sophia.

At the Great Palace, the coronation banquet took place, for the imperial family only, while the lower court dignitaries attended, but did not dine. The megas domestikos was responsible for serving the emperors, or, if he was not available, one of the despots, sebastokratores, or kaisares. On the following day, the emperors left for the main imperial residence, the Palace of Blachernae. There another senator distributed epikombia to the people, while the new emperor himself threw gold coins to the court dignitaries and their sons, assembled in the palace courtyard. Festivities at the palace continued for several days thereafter—according to Pseudo-Kodinos, ten, unless otherwise specified by the emperor—with banquets at which all court dignitaries dined.

== Religious elements ==
Starting in the 5th and 6th centuries, the coronation ceremonies were infused more and more with Christian religious symbolism: apart from the presence of the patriarch, the emperor's speech and the responses of the crowd came to feature religious invocations.

=== Role of the Patriarch of Constantinople ===
The act of imposition of the crown by the Patriarch of Constantinople was introduced at the coronation of Emperor Leo I the Thracian in 457—and not, as asserted in later Byzantine tradition and still repeated in older scholarship, at the coronation of Marcian in 450. The Patriarch of Constantinople's role in the ceremony, and its possible constitutional significance, has been the subject of considerable scholarly speculation.

Examining the 5th-century coronations, the German legal historian Wilhelm Sickel considered that the patriarch was acting as a state functionary, namely as the foremost non-imperial personage of the capital, and that the act of conferring the crown by a cleric was preferred as less likely to arouse jealousies than if a secular official had done the same. Even though it is generally acknowledged that the Byzantines conceived of imperial power as a "gift from God", many modern scholars follow Sickel's opinion, and stress that although coronation by the patriarch granted prestige and legitimacy, from a constitutional point of view, it was not strictly necessary. This view was summarized by the historian Wilhelm Ensslin in his chapter on the Byzantine government in The Cambridge Medieval History: the acclamation was the "decisive act in appointing an emperor", but unlike the Pope's role in coronations in the Holy Roman Empire, "in the East the Patriarch at first acted as the representative not of the Church but of the electors, and his participation was not regarded as an essential element in making an imperial election constitutionally valid". Even so, Ensslin conceded that over time, the coronation ceremony "took on an increasingly ecclesiastical complexion," and that the patriarch's role "came increasingly to be regarded as a usage sanctified by custom".

Other scholars, such as J. B. Bury (who notably vacillated in his views), Gavro Manojlović, George Ostrogorsky, André Grabar, and Peter Charanis, have voiced the different opinion that the patriarch's participation had a constitutional significance, to the effect that the new ruler had to be a Christian, and that the conferment of the crown signalled the Church's acceptance of him. The common view remains that the patriarch's participation reflected "the church's prestige and individual patriarchs' political stature", but Charanis has pointed out that throughout Byzantine history there are numerous indications that a patriarchal coronation alone conferred full legitimacy to an emperor. Thus in 1143, Manuel I Komnenos, although already crowned by his father, John II Komnenos, in the field, repeated the coronation upon his return to Constantinople. After the Fourth Crusade, Theodore I Laskaris, founder of the Empire of Nicaea, was unable to be crowned emperor until he had filled the vacant position of Patriarch of Constantinople; in 1261, the coronation of Michael VIII Palaiologos in Constantinople gave him enough legitimacy for the removal of the rightful dynastic emperor, John IV Laskaris, from power; in the civil war of 1341–1347, John VI Kantakouzenos crowned himself emperor in 1341 in the presence of the Patriarch of Jerusalem, but had to repeat the ceremony after his victory in the war, in Constantinople, after installing a willing patriarch there; and a few years later, the coronation of John VI's son Matthew Kantakouzenos as co-emperor had also to be postponed until a new, more pliable patriarch was found. Another significant case demonstrating the leverage afforded a patriarch due to the necessity of a patriarchal coronation was the refusal of Patriarch Polyeuktos to crown the usurper John I Tzimiskes, who came to the throne by assassinating Nikephoros II Phokas in 969. Polyeuktos demanded that he cast off Phokas' empress, Theophano, who had conspired with Tzimiskes, reveal the name of the assassin, and repeal Phokas' laws restricting the autonomy of the Church, before consenting to crown Tzimiskes emperor.

The last Byzantine emperor, Constantine XI Palaiologos (r. 1449–1453), was not crowned in Constantinople. He was proclaimed emperor in Mystras in the Peloponnese, where he ruled the local Byzantine province. Despite a later tradition that he was crowned there by the Metropolitan of Lacedaemonia, this appears to be inaccurate, although the local populace and garrison likely filled in the roles prescribed by the ceremonial for their Constantinopolitan counterparts. A regular coronation ceremony was not repeated in Constantinople, as Patriarch Gregory III Mammas was shunned by the local populace due to his pro-Unionist stance with regards to the Catholic Church, and Constantine himself was, at least publicly, also a supporter of the Union. The contemporary historian Doukas for instance considered Constantine's predecessor, John VIII Palaiologos, as the last legitimate 'Emperor of the Romans' as a result.

The perception of patriarchal participation being a prerequisite for an imperial coronation also carried over into the states influenced by Byzantium. In 913, in an attempt to prevent him from attacking Constantinople, Patriarch Nicholas I Mystikos performed a type of coronation on the Bulgarian ruler, Simeon, at Hebdomon. Although the exact nature of that coronation is disputed, the location of the ceremony, which had previously been used for Byzantine imperial coronations, and the fact that the Patriarch of Constantinople performed it, signalled the conferment of the title of emperor (or tsar) on Simeon. Indeed, both Simeon and the later Second Bulgarian Empire felt compelled to create their own, Bulgarian patriarchs, as an integral part of their imperial aspirations. Likewise, when the Serbian king Stefan Dushan wanted to declare himself emperor in 1346, he first appointed a Serbian patriarch, who then performed the imperial coronation at Skopje.

Apart from the act of coronation itself, the patriarch played another important role through the coronation oath demanded of a new emperor. The oath is first recorded in the coronation of Anastasius I in 491, when Patriarch Euphemius required of Anastasius a written oath that he would maintain the Church and the Orthodox faith. This act was clearly exceptional, arising from the well-known Monophysite beliefs of Anastasius, and Euphemius' opposition to his candidacy. Similar oaths are sometimes attested in later centuries (for Phocas in 602, Leo III the Isaurian in 717, Michael I Rhangabe in 811, and Leo V the Armenian in 815), but the oath was not regularized until the late Byzantine period, and is attested as late as the ceremony for Constantine XI Palaiologos, in 1449. This oath was not only a safeguard of religious orthodoxy, but also contained guarantees of the Church and its privileges and promises to rule with justice; according to Charanis, it was the "nearest Byzantine document to a constitutional charter".

Charanis points to the acceptance by emperors of terms set by the patriarchs, as a clear sign that they regarded a coronation by the patriarch "an act necessary for the completion of [their] enthronement", and argues that "it is difficult to draw any other inference than that the coronation of a newly designated emperor was an ecclesiastical act essential for the completion of his enthronement and was performed by the patriarch in his role of the highest official of the church". Charanis also argues that the papal coronation of Charlemagne as emperor in 800 is another piece of evidence in supporting the view that the coronation ceremony was both religious and necessary for the conferment of the imperial dignity, since the Pope was evidently following Byzantine precedent.

=== Introduction of the unction ===
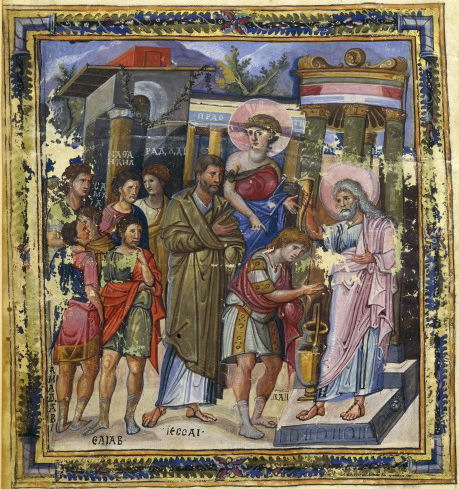
The Anointing of David, miniature from the 10th-century Byzantine Paris Psalter

The act of unction during a coronation followed well-known Biblical tradition, namely the anointing of David. A number of middle Byzantine sources make references to anointing of emperors, for example for Basil I the Macedonian, but this usage is metaphorical and inspired by the Biblical example; the act of unction is not mentioned either by Constantine VII or by the euchologia. The earliest possible dates to actual unctions are references by the historian Niketas Choniates to Manuel I Komnenos being anointed in 1143, and Alexios III Angelos entering the Hagia Sophia "to be anointed emperor according to custom" in 1195. It is impossible to say with certainty whether these cases are meant literally, or are also metaphors derived from Biblical tradition. The first Byzantine ruler known with certainty (also through accounts written by Choniates) to have been anointed as well as crowned was Theodore I Laskaris, the founder of the Empire of Nicaea, in 1208.

While the mention of an unction for Manuel I Komnenos is generally regarded as a metaphor or word-play, this is less certain for Alexios III. Nevertheless, Ostrogorsky firmly argued in favour of a post-1204 innovation at the court of Nicaea, in imitation of the ritual used at the coronation of the Latin Emperor Baldwin I, and has been followed by other scholars since, such as Dimiter Angelov, who placed its adoption in the context of the rising importance and influence of the Church vis-à-vis the imperial office in the final centuries of the Byzantine Empire's existence. However, Donald M. Nicol pointed out that Theodore I Laskaris, being intent on restoring Byzantine traditions, was unlikely to have copied a ritual from the Latins occupying Constantinople, and that when writing about the coronation of Laskaris' rival, Theodore Komnenos Doukas, as emperor in Thessalonica in 1225, the contemporary sources seem to consider the unction as a normal, time-honoured and fixed part of a new emperor's accession, along with the acclamation and the coronation. According to Nicol, this indicated that the practice was possibly introduced in the late 12th century, although still under Latin influence.

The substance used in the unction was also debated: in the 1220s, the Archbishop of Ohrid, Demetrios Chomatenos, who crowned Theodore Komnenos Doukas, was also engaged in a dispute with the Patriarch of Constantinople (in exile at the Nicaean court) over whether the emperor was to be anointed with oil (elaion)—according to Chomatenos, this was the traditional way—or chrism (myron) such as used during baptism, and used in the coronation of Theodore I Laskaris. The use of chrism was definitely adopted by the end of the 13th century. Unlike Western practice, where the body was anointed with chrism and the head with oil, the Byzantine unction of the emperor consisted simply of the patriarch tracing the sign of the cross on the emperor's head. According to the Byzantine authors, this signified the emperor's status as the "anointed of Christ" and head of all Christendom. The act sanctified the emperor, highlighted by the repeated exclamation 'holy!' (hagios!) by the patriarch and the people during the coronation ceremony.

== Representation of coronations in art ==
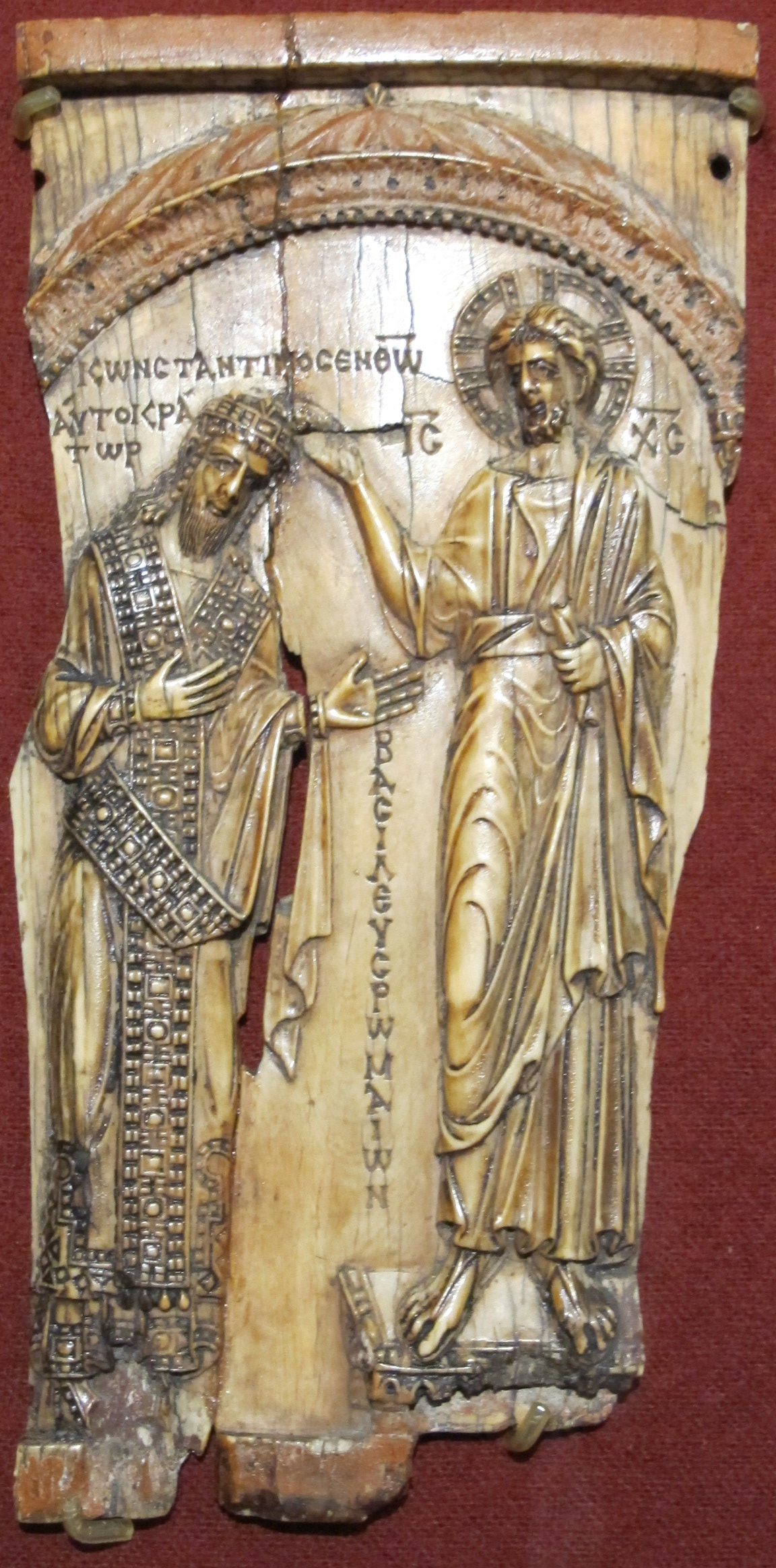
Ivory plaque showing Constantine VII being crowned by Christ, 945 CE

Imperial coronations are often found in Byzantine art, across a wide range of objects, from paintings and manuscript miniatures to ivory carvings and coins. In most cases, and especially in coins and ivory plaques meant to commemorate the coronation (and possibly handed out as gifts by the emperor), the emperor or imperial couple are shown being crowned by Christ, the Theotokos, or an archangel. This is meant to symbolize the special connection between the emperor and God, and the notion of the emperor being chosen by God. In contrast, the coronation scenes in the illuminated manuscript of the Madrid Skylitzes are meant to illustrate the narrative, and show the event in a historical setting, with the Patriarch of Constantinople performing the coronation.

== Influence ==
In the Empire of Trebizond (1204–1461), one of the Byzantine successor states established after the Fourth Crusade, which also claimed the Byzantine imperial inheritance, a largely similar ceremony was used, although not many details are known. The raising on a shield is not mentioned, nor is the unction, although if the latter was part of 12th-century ceremonies, it is possible it was included. The other differences arose from the use of the churches of Panagia Chrysokephalos and Saint Eugenios rather than the Hagia Sophia in Trebizond, and the city's different geography, which precluded the kind of procession and ceremonial from palace to church as carried out in Constantinople.

The coronation of Dmitry Ivanovich as heir-apparent by his grandfather, Ivan III of Russia, in 1498, was inspired by Byzantine rituals, such as those described in De Ceremoniis for the imperial coronation, as well as for the creation of a Caesar, a rank which often was given to Byzantine heirs-apparent at the time. When Grand Prince Ivan the Terrible was crowned as the tsar of all Russia on 16 January 1547, the 1498 ceremony was drawn upon, as well as a description of Manuel II Palaiologos' coronation in 1392 by the archdeacon Ignatius of Smolensk, as well as other 14th-century Byzantine sources. The religious part of the ceremony and the regalia used—a purple robe, a mantle, sceptre, etc.—were copied almost exactly. Some elements, namely the acclamation by the people and the raising on a shield, were omitted, while the distribution of largess was misinterpreted and the newly crowned ruler instead showered with coins.

== Sources ==
- Angelov, Dimiter (2007). Imperial Ideology and Political Thought in Byzantium, 1204–1330. Cambridge and New York: Cambridge University Press. ISBN 978-0-521-85703-1.
- Bardashova, Tatiana (2016). Imperial Coronation in the Empire of Trebizond (1204-1461). 23rd International Congress of Byzantine Studies, Belgrade, 22–27 August 2016. Round Table: Gesture and Performance in Byzantium. pp. 3–6.
- Boak, A. E. R. (1919). "Imperial Coronation Ceremonies of the Fifth and Sixth Centuries". Harvard Studies in Classical Philology. 30: 37–47. doi:10.2307/310612. JSTOR 310612.
- Brightman, F. E. (April 1901). "Byzantine Imperial Coronations". The Journal of Theological Studies. 2 (7): 359–392. doi:10.1093/jts/os-II.7.359. JSTOR 23949289.
- Burgess, R. W. (1993–1994). "The Accession of Marcian in the Light of Chalcedonian Apologetic and Monophysite Polemic". Byzantinische Zeitschrift. 86/87: 47–68.
- Charanis, Peter (1941). "Coronation and Its Constitutional Significance in the Later Roman Empire". Byzantion. 15: 49–66. JSTOR 44168516.
- Charanis, Peter (1974). "Church-State Relations in the Byzantine Empire as Reflected in the Role of the Patriarch in the Coronation of the Byzantine Emperor". In Blane, Andrew; Bird, Thomas E. (eds.). Russia and Orthodoxy: Essays in Honor of Georges Florovsky, Vol. 3: The Ecumenical World of Orthodox Civilisation. The Hague and Paris: Mouton. pp. 77–90.
- Charanis, Peter (1976). "Imperial Coronation in Byzantium: Some New Evidence". Byzantina. 8: 37–46. ISSN 1105-0772.
- Constantine Porphyrogennetos: The Book of Ceremonies. Byzantina Australiensia. Translated by Ann Moffatt and Maxeme Tall. Leiden and Boston: Brill. 2017. ISBN 978-18-76-50342-0.
- Flavius Cresconius Corippus; Cameron, Averil (1976). In Laudem Iustini Augusti Minoris, Libri IV. Translated by Averil Cameron. Bloomsbury. ISBN 978-04-85-11157-6.
- Croke, Brian (2005). "Dynasty and Ethnicity: Emperor Leo I and the Eclipse of Aspar". Chiron. 35: 147–204. doi:10.34780/8691-wdvt. S2CID 194950295.
- Ensslin, W. (1942). "Zur Frage nach der ersten Kaiserkrönung durch den Patriarchen und zur Bedeutung dieses Aktes im Wahlzeremoniell". Byzantinische Zeitschrift (in German). 42: 101–115. doi:10.1515/byzs.1942.42.1.101. S2CID 194042002.
- Guilland, Rodolphe (1967). "Titres des eunuques". Recherches sur les institutions byzantines [Studies on the Byzantine Institutions]. Berliner byzantinische Arbeiten 35 (in French). Vol. I. Berlin and Amsterdam: Akademie-Verlag & Adolf M. Hakkert. pp. 266–299. OCLC 878894516.
- Hupchick, Dennis P. (2017). The Bulgarian-Byzantine Wars for Early Medieval Balkan Hegemony. Silver-Lined Skulls and Blinded Armies. Palgrave Macmillan. ISBN 978-3-319-56205-6.
- Kazhdan, Alexander, ed. (1991). The Oxford Dictionary of Byzantium. Oxford and New York: Oxford University Press. ISBN 0-19-504652-8.
- MacCormack, Sabine G. (1981). Art and Ceremony in Late Antiquity. Berkeley, Los Angeles, and London: University of California Press. ISBN 0-520-03779-0.
- Macrides, Ruth (2011). "Ceremonies And The City: The Court In Fourteenth-Century Constantinople". In Duindam, Jeroen; Artan, Tülay; Kunt, Metin (eds.). Royal Courts in Dynastic States and Empires: A Global Perspective. Brill. pp. 217–235. doi:10.1163/ej.9789004206229.i-444.56. ISBN 978-90-04-20622-9. S2CID 187729379.
- Macrides, Ruth; Munitiz, J. A.; Angelov, Dimiter (2013). Pseudo-Kodinos and the Constantinopolitan Court: Offices and Ceremonies. Farnham, Surrey: Ashgate. ISBN 978-0-7546-6752-0.
- Majeska, George P. (1978). "The Moscow Coronation of 1498 Reconsidered". Jahrbücher für Geschichte Osteuropas. 26 (3): 353–361.
- Miller, David B. (1967). "The Coronation of Ivan IV of Moscow". Jahrbücher für Geschichte Osteuropas. 15 (4): 559–574. JSTOR 41045749.
- Nicol, Donald M. (1976). "Kaisersalbung. The Unction of Emperors in Late Byzantine Coronation Ritual". Byzantine and Modern Greek Studies. 2: 37–52. doi:10.1179/030701376790206234. S2CID 161949164.
- Nicol, Donald M. (1992). The Immortal Emperor: The Life and Legend of Constantine Palaiologos, Last Emperor of the Romans. Cambridge: Cambridge University Press. ISBN 978-0-511-58369-8.
- Ostrogorsky, George (1955). "Zur Kaisersalbung und Schilderhebung im spätbyzantinischen Krönungszeremoniell". Historia: Zeitschrift für Alte Geschichte (in German). IV (2/3): 246–256. JSTOR 4434456.
- Runciman, Steven (2009) [1980]. Lost Capital of Byzantium: The History of Mistra and the Peloponnese. Tauris Parke Paperbacks. ISBN 978-1-84511-895-2.
- Sickel, Wilhelm (1898). "Das byzantinische Krönungsrecht bis zum 10. Jarhundert". Byzantinische Zeitschrift (in German). 7 (3). Leipzig: 511–557. doi:10.1515/byzs.1898.7.3.511. S2CID 191571621.
- Soulis, George C. (1984). The Serbs and Byzantium During the Reign of Emperor Stephen Dušan (1331–1355) and his Successors. Dumbarton Oaks. ISBN 0-88402-137-8.
- Tsamakda, Vasiliki (2002). The Illustrated Chronicle of Ioannes Skylitzes in Madrid. Leiden: Alexandros. ISBN 978-9-0806-4762-6.
