= Eustathius I =

Eustathius I may refer to:

- Eustathius of Antioch, Patriarch in 324–337 or 360
- Patriarch Eustatius of Alexandria, Greek Patriarch of Alexandria in 813–817
- Eustathius of Constantinople, Ecumenical Patriarch in 1019–1025
- Jevstatije I, Serbian Archbishop in 1279–1286
