= Patriarch Sergius of Constantinople =

Patriarch Sergius of Constantinople may refer to:

- Sergius II of Constantinople, Ecumenical Patriarch in 1001–1019
- Sergius I of Constantinople, Ecumenical Patriarch in 610–638
