= Arsenius the Great =

Desert Father

Saint Arsenius
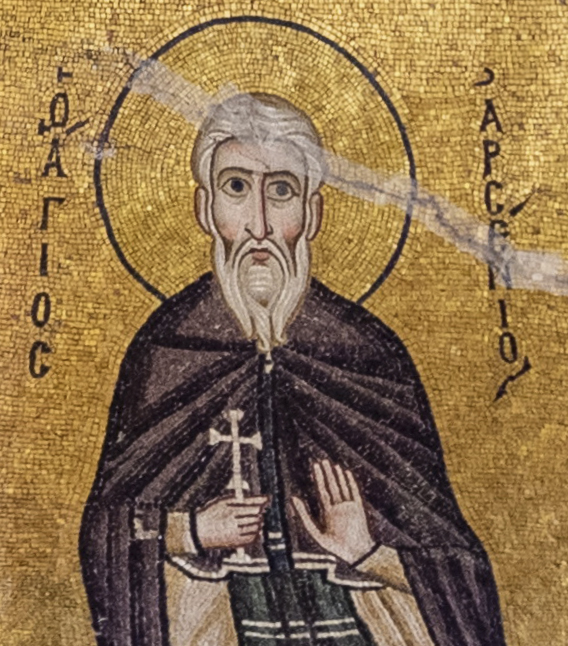
- Fresco at Hosios Loukas, 11th century

the Deacon, the Roman, the Great
- Born: c. 354; Rome, Italia, Roman Empire
- Died: c. 450; Troe, Egypt, Roman Empire
- Venerated in: Church of the East; Eastern Orthodox Church; Roman Catholic Church; Oriental Orthodox Churches
- Canonized: pre-congregation
- Feast: May 8 (Eastern Orthodox Church and Roman Catholic Church); 13 Pashons (Coptic Orthodox Church)

Arsenius the Deacon (c. 354 – 450), sometimes known as Arsenius of Scetis and Turah, Arsenius the Roman or Arsenius the Great, was a Roman imperial tutor who became an anchorite in Egypt, one of the most highly regarded of the Desert Fathers, whose teachings were greatly influential on the development of asceticism and the contemplative life.

His contemporaries so admired him as to surname him "the Great". His feast day is celebrated on May 8 in the Eastern Orthodox Church and in the Roman Catholic Church, though Roman Catholics kept his date on July 19 prior to the revision of the Roman Martyrology after the Second Vatican Council. He is celebrated on 13 Pashons in the Coptic Orthodox Church.

== Biography ==
He was born in 350 AD, in Rome to a Christian, Roman senatorial family. He received a fine education, studying rhetoric and philosophy, and mastered the Latin and Greek languages. Arsenius is said to have been made a deacon by Pope Damasus I who recommended him to Byzantine Emperor Theodosius I the Great, who had requested the Emperor Gratian and Pope Damasus around 383 to find him in the West a tutor for his sons (future emperors Arcadius and Honorius). Arsenius was chosen on the basis of being a man well read in Greek literature. He reached Constantinople in 383, and continued as tutor in the imperial family for eleven years, during the last three of which he also had charge of his original pupil Arcadius's brother, Honorius. Coming one day to see his sons at their studies, Theodosius found them sitting while Arsenius talked to them standing. This he would not tolerate, and caused the teacher to sit and the pupils to stand. On his arrival at court Arsenius had been given a splendid establishment, and probably because the Emperor so desired, he lived in great pomp. He lived a lavish life in the palace, but all the time felt a growing inclination to renounce the world. He left Constantinople and came by sea to Alexandria and fled into the wilderness. When he first presented himself to Macarius the Great, the father of the monks of Scetis, he recommended him to the care of John the Dwarf to try him.

Sometime around the year 400 he joined the desert monks at Scetes, Egypt, and asked to be admitted among the solitaries who dwelt there. John the Dwarf, to whose cell he was conducted, though previously warned of the quality of his visitor, took no notice of him and left him standing by himself while he invited the rest to sit down at table. When the repast was half finished he threw down some bread before him, bidding him with an air of indifference eat if he would. Arsenius meekly picked up the bread and ate, sitting on the ground. Satisfied with this proof of humility, John kept him under his direction and tonsured him into monasticism.

In 434 he was forced to leave due to raids on the monasteries and hermitages there by the Mazices (tribesmen from Libya). He relocated to Troe (near Memphis), and also spent some time on the island of Canopus (off Alexandria). He spent the next fifteen years wandering the desert wilderness before returning to Troe to die c. 445 at the age of around 95.

During the fifty-five years of his solitary life he was always the most meanly clad of all, thus punishing himself for his former seeming vanity in the world. In like manner, to atone for having used perfumes at court, he never changed the water in which he moistened the palm leaves of which he made mats, but only poured in fresh water upon it as it wasted, thus letting it become stenchy in the extreme. Even while engaged in manual labour he never relaxed in his application to prayer. At all times copious tears of devotion fell from his eyes. But what distinguished him most was his disinclination to all that might interrupt his union with God. When, after long search, his place of retreat was discovered, he not only refused to return to court and act as adviser to his former pupil, now Roman Emperor, Arcadius, but he would not even be his almoner to the poor and the monasteries of the neighbourhood. He invariably denied himself to visitors, no matter what their rank and condition and left to his disciples the care of entertaining them. A biography of Arsenius was written by Theodore the Studite.

Arsenius was a man who was very quiet and often silent, as evidenced by an adage of his: "Many times have I repented of having spoken, but never have I repented of having remained silent."

== Works ==
There are several writings that are attributed to him: a guideline for monastic life titled Διδασκαλία καὶ παραίνεσις (Instructions and Advice), and a short commentary on the Gospel of Luke titled Εἰς τὸν πειραστήν νομικόν (On the Temptation of the Law). The most important is a letter preserved in Georgian and published by G. Garitte, while its authenticity was acknowledged by Van Parys. Apart from this, many sayings of or about Arsenius are contained in the Apophthegmata Patrum. As there is no critical edition of the Greek text of the Apophthegmata, the primary reference is still Migne's Patrologia graeca, but there are several English translations (published by B. Ward, J. Wortley, R. Goodrich, and T. Vivian).

== Tura monastery ==
Despite his love of complete solitude, Saint Arsenius did have a few disciples: Alexander, Zoilus, and Daniel. His contacts with them were intermittent (Arsenius 32), but for the last two years of his life some of them lived in his vicinity, in Tura, at the Mokattam Mountain, about fifteen kilometers south of the Babylon Fortress (later Fusṭaṭ).

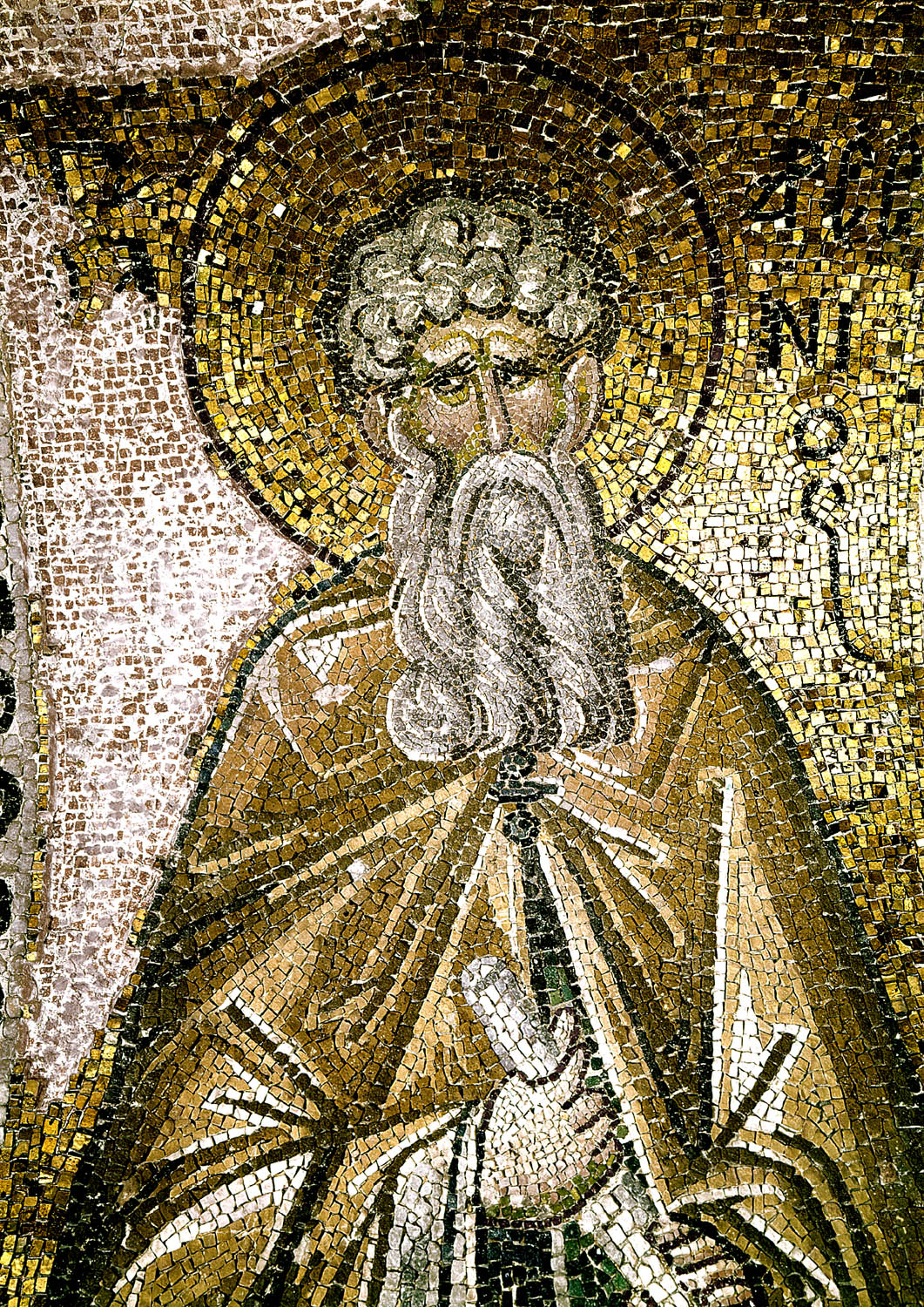
mosaic of Saint Arsenios from the Pammakaristos Church

In Arsenius 43 (in the Alphapbetical collection of the Apophthegmata Patrum) the placename is given as Τρώη; in other Greek sources, this place is known since the 3rd century BC as Τροία or Τρωία. In English, it is commonly transcribed as Troa or Troe. Its modern Arabic name is Ṭurā (also spelled as Turah or Tora).

The body of the anchorite was transferred from the mountain cave to a church, and buried under the altar, beneath the dome. According to the 10th-century Greek Orthodox Patriarch Eutychius of Alexandria (Nazm al-Jauhar / Eutychii Annales) and other medieval authors, the church (as well as the surrounding monastic cells) was built for the tomb of Arsenius by the Emperor Arcadius, whose tutor Arsenius had been. The Coptic Synaxarium relates another tradition - that this was done by Arcadius' son Theodosius II. The latter seems to have taken his body or at least some of his relics to Constantinople (which is also stated by Francesco Pipino in 1320).

The influential monastery that developed into one of the principal Chalcedonian (Eastern Orthodox) strongholds in the Lower Egypt (besides Canopus community of Metanoia) got many names through the centuries: Dayr Arsaniyus, Dayr al-Haraqal (Monastery of Heraclius, who perhaps renovated it and enclosed it with walls), Dayr al-Qusayr (Little Fortress Monastery), Dayr al-Yunan (Greek Monastery), and Dayr al-Baghl (Monastery of the Mule, as this animal was used to bring there water and other necessities).

The land around the monastery became the main burial ground for the Eastern Orthodox (the 'Chalcedonians' or the 'Melkites', as they were called) of the Babylon-Cairo region. Aside from the vast central cemetery, there was also a smaller one, next to the cave-church of St John the Baptist (possibly used for the monks).

According to Abu al-Makarim (d. 1209, History of Churches and Monasteries), Eustathius, who was the hegumen of this monastery and later became the Greek Orthodox Patriarch of Alexandria (813-817), built the church of Ss Peter and Paul and a hermitage for the visiting bishops.

As other Christian sites in Egypt, the monastery was regularly exposed to Muslim attacks. Together with all the other Christian locations of the Caliphate, the Tura community was ransacked and destroyed by the decree of al-Hakim in 1010, while the local Muslim population opened every single grave to seize the coffins or any other valuables, throwing all the bones out. Solomon IV, the bishop and hegumen of the monastery of Mount Sinai, presented a petition to the caliph for restitution of the property to the Greek Orthodox Patriarchate of Alexandria and permission to rebuild the monastery, which was granted in 1020.

The monastery was one of the major pilgrimage sites, as is attested in the 13th-century vita (by the monk Theodosius) of the first Serbian archbishop, St Sava, who visited the Egyptian holy places in 1234.

In 1320 the Dominican friar from Bologna, Francesco Pipino, visited the monastery. Apart from the Greek Chalcedonian monks, he found there also many Coptic Non-Chalcedonian hermits, living in the nearby cells.

In the period from 1250 to 1354, Egypt was the scene of eight episodes of large-scale violence, with the Muslim authorities and mobs destroying churches and killing innumerable Christians: around 300,000 Christians may have been killed during the Mamluk era. The Muslim chronicler and historian al-Maqrizi (1364–1442) describes the devastation and atrocities carried out in 1321. (An English translation of al-Maqrizi’s account of the events in 1321 can be found in The Churches and Monasteries of Egypt and some Neighbouring Countries by B. Evetts.)

According to him, the 1321 brutalities began when the sultan Al-Nasir Muhammad started his large construction projects, which included tearing down the church in the neighborhood of Kanatir as-Saba. Al-Maqrizi gives a mystical note to the whole event, claiming that the attacks were spontaneously done throughout Egypt at the same time (during the Friday prayers), being miraculously approved by several Islamic mystics in the state of trance. For instance, in the Al-Azhar Mosque:

...one of the fakirs [a mystical Islamic ascetic] fell into a sort of trembling, and when the hour of prayer was announced, before the preacher appeared, he stepped forward and said: “Destroy the churches of the enemies and unbelievers! God is great! God grant victory and help!” Then he began again to tremble, and cried out: “Down to the ground! Down to the ground!”

For al-Maqrizi, all this was inexplicable and even “wonderful”, and although designating the massacres as “terrible”, he cites an opinion that “it was a decree and ordinance of God, who knew the great corruption of the Christians and their increasing pride, so that that which had happened might serve as a punishment for them”.

In a short span of time, the Muslim mobs destroyed 11 churches in Cairo, and another 49 in other parts of the country. Soon after, a series of fires broke out in Cairo, aggravated by the strong winds. Three monks from the Monastery of the Mule (i.e. the Tura community) were caught and accused of revenge arson attacks on mosques, which they confessed to after torturing. The killing spree of Muslim mobs lasted for several weeks. Fourteen Chalcedonian monks of Arsenius' monastery were burned, and the monastery was ultimately abandoned. In the time of al-Maqrizi, there was only a single caretaker of the monastery grounds.

In 1941, the British soldiers, while clearing out a cavern in Tura, discovered nearly two thousand pages of papyrus belonging to eight codices, the so-called Tura Papyri, mostly works of Origen and Didymus the Blind. Some scholars suggest that they were hidden at the time of Origenist controversies and originated from Arsenius Monastery.

== See also ==
- Desert Fathers
- Saint Arsenius the Great, patron saint archive
- Or (monk)
- Scetes
- Daniel of Scetis, disciple and biographer of Arsenius

== Sources ==
- al-Maqrīzī, Taqi al-Din (1853). al-Mawāʻiẓ wa-al-Iʻtibār bi-Dhikr al-Khiṭaṭ wa-al-āthār. Vol. 2). Boulaq. pp. 512–517. [In Arabic]
- al-Maqrīzī, Taqi al-Din (1895). "Account of the Monasteries and Churches of the Christians of Egypt". In Evetts, Basil Thomas Alfred (ed.). The Churches and Monasteries of Egypt and Some Neighbouring Countries. Oxford: Clarendon Press. pp. 305–346.
- The Anonymous Sayings of the Desert Fathers: A Select Edition and Complete English Translation. Translated by John Wortley. Cambridge: Cambridge University Press. 2017. ISBN 978-1108439022.
- Attwater, Donald and Catherine Rachel John. The Penguin Dictionary of Saints, 3rd edition. New York: Penguin Books, 1993. ISBN 0-14-051312-4.
- The Book of the Elders: Sayings of the Desert Fathers: The Systematic Collection. Translated by John Wortley. Collegeville, Minnesota: Liturgical Press. 2012. ISBN 978-0879072018.
- Bumazhnov, Dmitrij F. (2010). "Revolution of the Solitaries, Arsenius the Great, and Socrates. An Early Theological Justification of the Radical Monastic Detachment from Society". Philologia Classica. 15 (1): 72–87. doi:10.21638/spbu20.2020.106.
- Anba Bishoy, Fr. Shenouda, ed. (1987–1995). Coptic Synaxarium (Vols. I-IV). Vol. 1–4. Chicago: Monee St George Coptic Orthodox church. Reprinted in one volume as: Coptic Synaxarium - Lives of Saints. London: Oxford Publishing House. 2006.
- Coquin, René-Georges; Martin, Maurice; Grossmann, Peter (1991). "Dayr Al-Qusayr". In Atiya, Aziz Suryal (ed.). Dayr Al-Qusayr – The Coptic encyclopedia. The Coptic encyclopedia, volume 3. Macmillan. pp. 853b–855b. ISBN 978-0028970370.
- Garitte, Gérard (1955). "Une "Lettre de S. Arsène" en géorgien". Le Muséon. 68: 259‒278.
- Give Me a Word: The Alphabetical Sayings of the Desert Fathers. Translated by John Wortley. Yonkers: St Vladimir's Seminary Press. 2014. ISBN 978-0881414974.
- This article incorporates text from a publication now in the public domain: Herbermann, Charles, ed. (1913). "St. Arsenius". Catholic Encyclopedia. New York: Robert Appleton Company.
- Johnstone, Patrick (17 January 2014). The Future of the Global Church: History, Trends and Possibilities. InterVarsity Press. p. 49. ISBN 978-0-8308-5712-8.
- Koenen, Ludwig; Müller-Wiener, Wolfgang (1968). "Zu den Papyri aus dem Arsenios-Kloster bei Tura". Zeitschrift für Papyrologie und Epigraphik. 2: 53–63.
- Konieczny, Peter (2016). "Cairo in 1321: How a City Burned from Religious Violence" (PDF). The Medieval Magazine. 2 (9): 17–21.
- Wortley, John, ed. (2023). More Sayings of the Desert Fathers: An English Translation and Notes. Cambridge: Cambridge University Press. ISBN 978-1108457071.
- Migne, Jacques-Paul, ed. (1857). Patrologiae cursus completus, series Graeca. Vol. 65. Paris: apud editorem.
- Migne, Jacques-Paul, ed. (1859). Patrologiae cursus completus, series Graeca. Vol. 66. Paris: apud editorem.
- Pipino, Francesco (1859). "Tractatulus de Locis Terrae Sanctae". In Tobler, Titus (ed.). Dritte Wanderung nach Palästina. Gotha: Verlag von Justus Perthes. pp. 399–412.
- Rāġib, Yūsuf (2010). "Les cimetières chrétiens et juifs de la région du Caire au Moyen age". Annales Islamologiques. 44: 169–194.
- Regnault, Lucien (1991). "Arsenius of Scetis and Turah, Saint". In Atiya, Aziz Suryal (ed.). Saint Arsenius of Scetis and Turah - The Coptic encyclopedia. The Coptic encyclopedia, volume 1. Macmillan. pp. 240a–241b. ISBN 978-0028970370.
- Saint Arsenius in Catholic Forum
- The Sayings and Stories of the Desert Fathers and Mothers: Volume 1: A–H (Êta). Translated by Tim Vivian. Collegeville Minnesota: Liturgical Press. 2021. ISBN 978-0879071097.
- The Sayings and Stories of the Desert Fathers and Mothers: Volume 2: Th–O (Theta–Oméga). Translated by Tim Vivian. Collegeville Minnesota: Liturgical Press. 2023. ISBN 978-0879072926.
- The Sayings of the Desert Fathers. The Alphabetical Collection. Translated by Benedicta Ward. Kalamazoo / Oxford: Cistercian Publications / A. R. Mowbray. 1975. ISBN 978-0879079598.
- The Teachings of the Desert Fathers. Translated by Richard Goodrich. New York / Mahwan: The Newman Press. 2020. ISBN 978-0809106455.
- Van Parys, Michel (1981). "La Lettre de saint Arsène". Irénikon. 54: 62–86.
- Teodosije (2016). Žitije svetoga Save. Banja Luka: Art print. ISBN 978-99955-97-56-6.
- "13 Pachans - The Departure of St. Arsanius The Tutor of the Emperor's Children - Coptic Synaxarium". St. Takla Haymanout Coptic Orthodox Website.
