= Sisinnius =

Sisinnius (Greek: Σισίννιος, Sisinnios, also Sissinnios) may refer to:

- Saint Sisinnius of Cyzicus (d. c. 325) - bishop
- Sisinnius I of Constantinople, Archbishop of Constantinople from 426 to 427
- Pope Sisinnius, Pope for about three weeks in 708
- Sisinnius II of Constantinople, Ecumenical Patriarch of Constantinople from 996 to 998
- Saint Sisinnius, one of the martyred missionaries sent by Saint Vigilius of Trent
- Saint Sisinnius of Parthia, depicted in "holy rider" charms of the Byzantine Period; see Gello
- Susenyos I, Emperor of Ethiopia from 1608 to 1632
- Susenyos II, Emperor of Ethiopia for about four months in 1770
