= Patriarch Basil I =

Patriarch Basil I may refer to:

- Basil I of Constantinople, Patriarch of Constantinople in 970–974
- Basil I of Bulgaria, Patriarch of Bulgaria c. 1186–c. 1232
- Vasilije, Serbian Patriarch in 1763–1765
