= Patriarch Basil of Constantinople =

Patriarch Basil of Constantinople may refer to:

- Basil I of Constantinople, Ecumenical Patriarch in 970–974
- Basil II of Constantinople, Ecumenical Patriarch in 1183–1186
- Basil III of Constantinople, Ecumenical Patriarch in 1925–1929
