= Patriarch Sophronius I =

Patriarch Sophronius I may refer to:

- Sophronius of Jerusalem, ruled in 634–638
- Patriarch Sophronius I of Alexandria, ruled in 841–860
- Sophronius I of Constantinople, ruled in 1463–1464
