= Patriarch Alexius =

Patriarch Alexius may refer to:

- Alexius of Constantinople, Ecumenical Patriarch in 1025–1043
- Patriarch Alexy I of Moscow, ruled in 1945–1970
- Patriarch Alexy II of Moscow, ruled in 1990–2008
