= Patriarch Nicholas of Constantinople =

Patriarch Nicholas of Alexandria may refer to:

- Nicholas I of Constantinople, Ecumenical Patriarch in 901–907 and 912–925
- Nicholas II of Constantinople, Ecumenical Patriarch in 984–996
- Nicholas III of Constantinople, Ecumenical Patriarch in 1084–1111
- Nicholas IV of Constantinople, Ecumenical Patriarch in 1147–1151
