= Christopher I =

Christopher I may refer to:

- Christopher I of Armenia, the Catholicos of Armenia 539 to 545
- Patriarch Christopher I of Alexandria, ruled in 817–841
- Christopher I of Denmark (1219–1259), King of Denmark from 1252 to 1259
- Christopher I, Margrave of Baden-Baden (1453–1527), Margrave of Baden-Baden from 1475 to 1515
- Christopher I, Burgrave and Count of Dohna-Schlodien (1665–1733)
