= Patriarch Anthony of Constantinople =

Patriarch Anthony of Constantinople may refer to:

- Anthony I of Constantinople, Ecumenical Patriarch in 821–837
- Anthony II of Constantinople, Ecumenical Patriarch in 893–901
- Anthony III of Constantinople, Ecumenical Patriarch in 974–979
- Anthony IV of Constantinople, Ecumenical Patriarch in 1389–1390 and 1391–1397
