= Alexius I (disambiguation) =

Alexius I or Alexios I Komnenos (1048–1118), was Byzantine Emperor.

Alexius I may also refer to:

- Alexius of Constantinople, Ecumenical Patriarch in 1025–1043
- Alexios I of Trebizond (c. 1182–1222), Emperor of Trapezunt
- Alexis of Russia (1629–1676), second Russian tsar of the Romanov dynasty
- Patriarch Alexy I of Moscow (1877–1970), 13th Patriarch of Moscow
