= Basil I (disambiguation) =

Basil I the Macedonian (c. 811–886) was a Byzantine emperor and founder of the Macedonian dynasty.

Basil I may also refer to:

- Basil I of Constantinople, surnamed Scamandrenus (d. 974), Patriarch of Constantinople 970–973
- Basil I, Patriarch of Bulgaria c. 1186–c. 1232
- Basil I of Russia (1371–1425), Grand Prince of Moscow and Vladimir 1389–1425
- Vasilije (1719–1772), Serbian Patriarch 1763–1765
