= Eukterion =

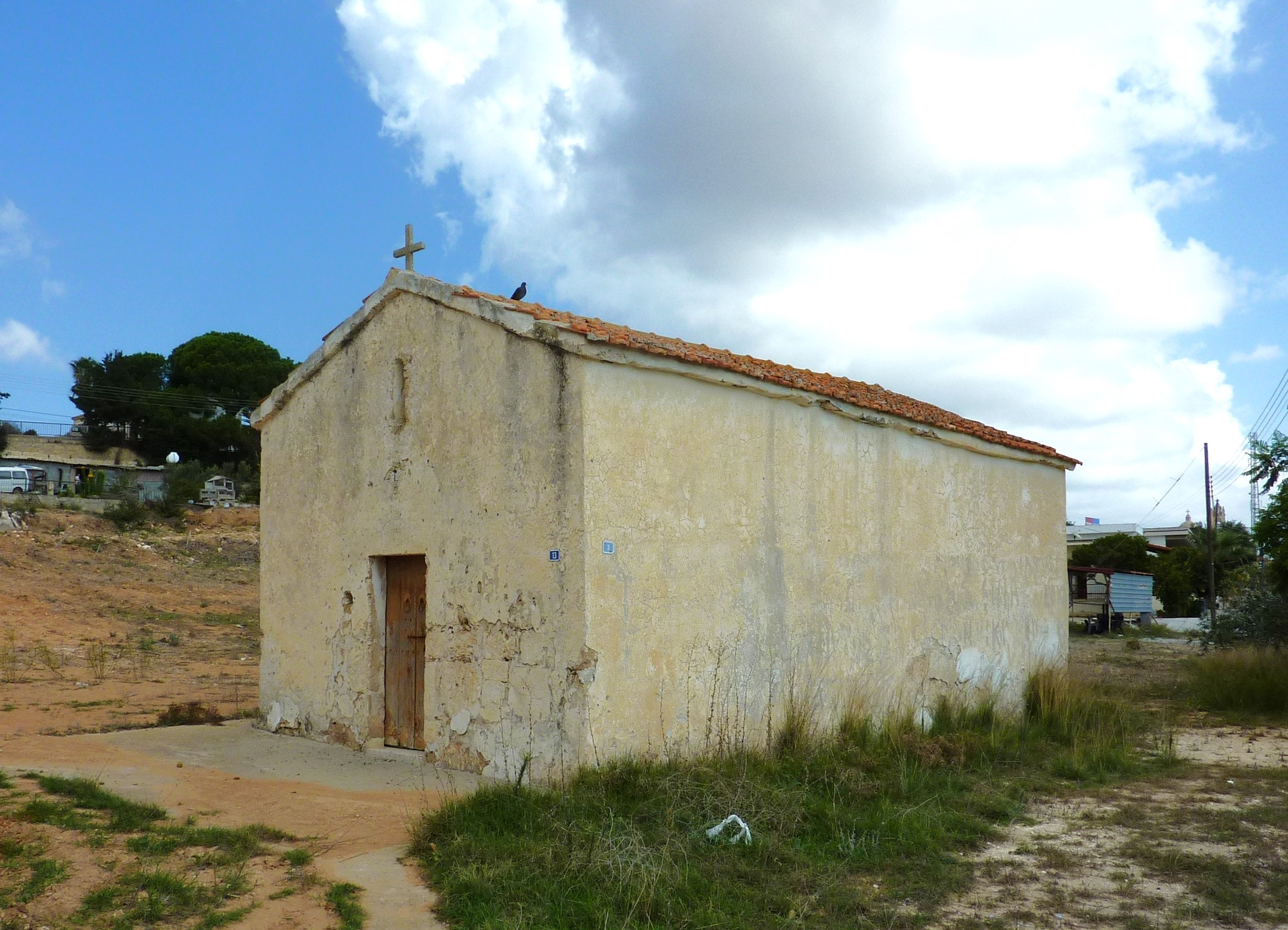
Eukterion or Orthodox Chapel in, Dipkarpaz, Northern Cyprus

Eukterion (Greek: εὑκτήριον), or eukterios oikos (εὑκτήριος οἰ̑κος), literally meaning "a house of prayer", was a term used in the Byzantine and some other Eastern Orthodox societies such as Georgia to refer to private churches—oratories and chapels—that were distinct from, or attached to, the main places of public worship (katholikai ekklesiai).

The legality of chapels in private houses was a controversial issue in the Byzantine law for centuries. In order to ensure that private eukteria remained separate and did not overburden the church's structure, as well as to prevent the dissemination of heresy, the emperor Justinian I (r. 527–565) introduced several preconditions for their construction and ordered some restrictions, including a ban on celebrating the liturgy in the oratories of private houses. The Council in Trullo in 692 extended the prohibition to baptism. Under Leo VI (r. 886–912), the restrictions were lifted, but the later patriarch Alexios Stoudites decided that this relaxation had led to many abuses and deprived bishops of much of control over the clergy and diocesan properties; in 1028, he forbade the use of eukteria for any service apart from the liturgy. Theodore Balsamon, the leading 12th-century Byzantine canonist, upheld the right of patrons to have regular liturgies and baptisms in their eukteria, but he was against the idea of anyone using a religious institution for his personal financial advantage. According to him, an eukterios oikos was a church that lacked consecration through chrismation, deposition of martyr relics, and enthronement of the officiating prelate.

== Gallery ==
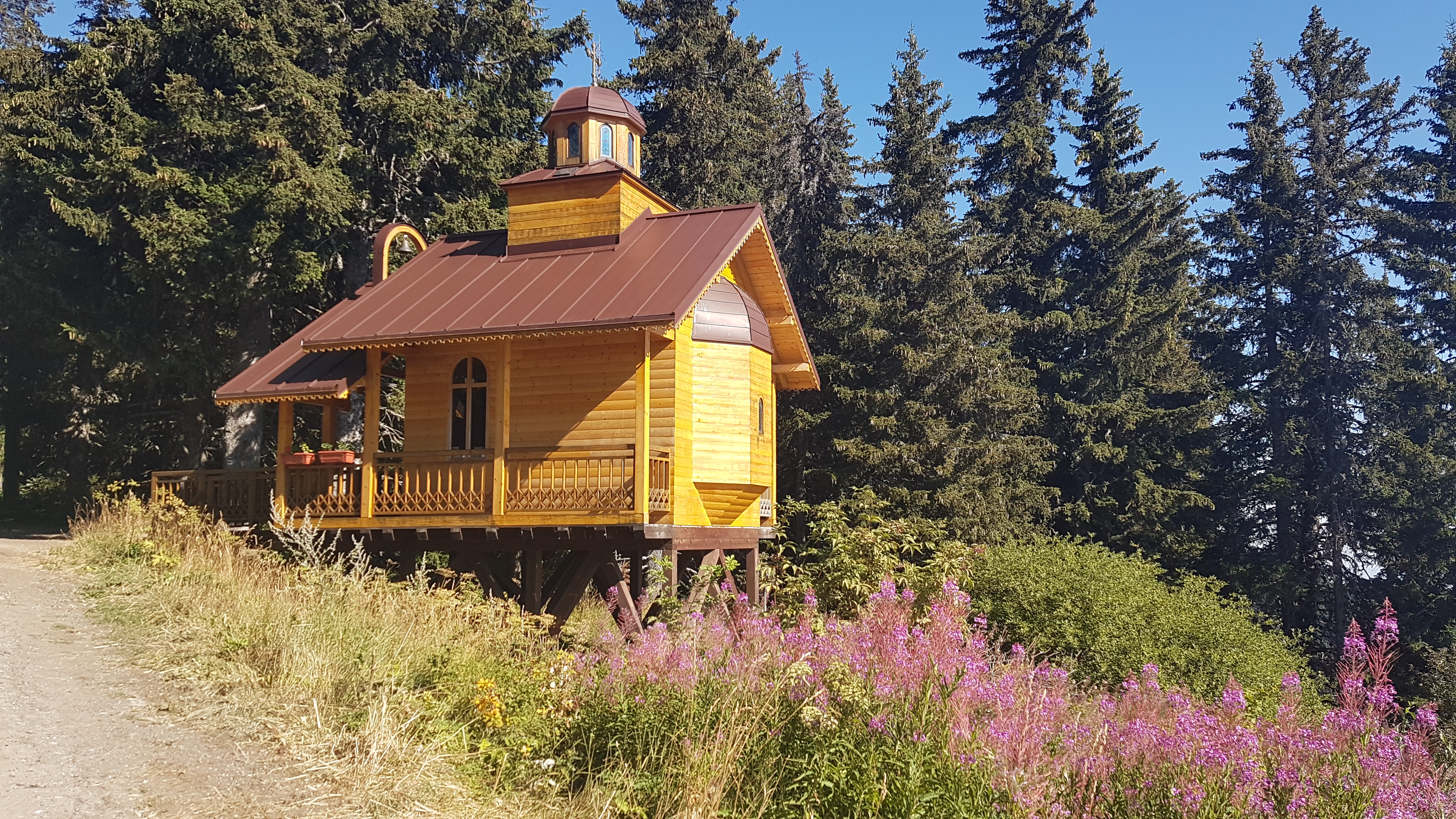
Eukterion in Bistritsa, Bulgaria

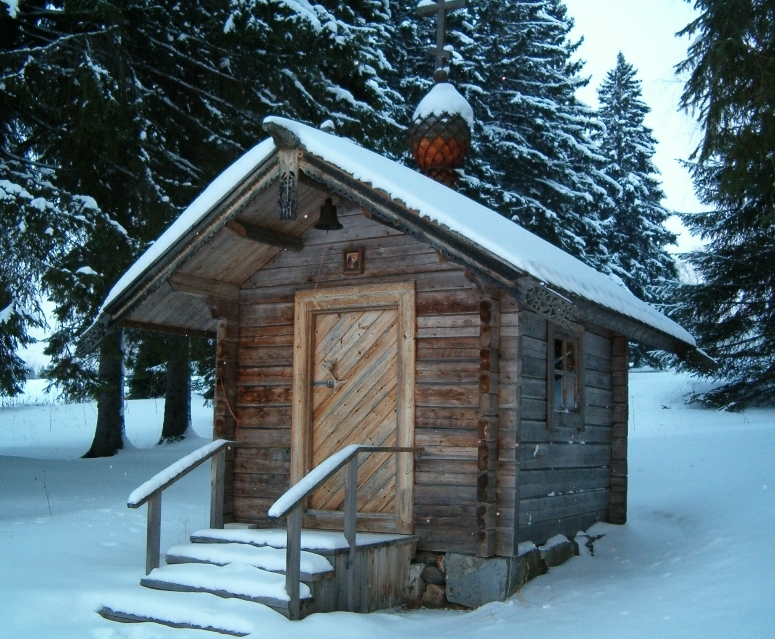
Eukterion of the New Valamo monastery in Heinävesi, Finland

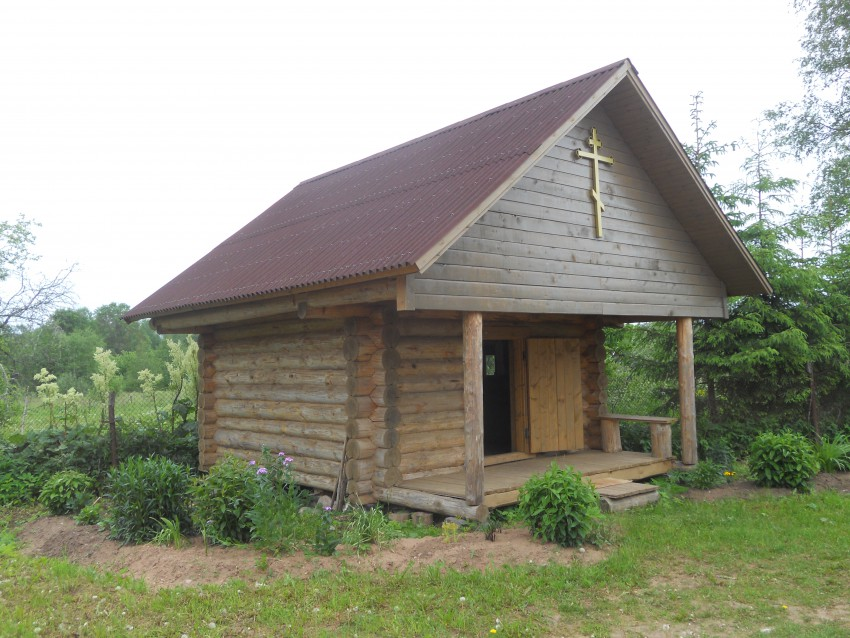
Eukterion in Luzhsky District, Russia

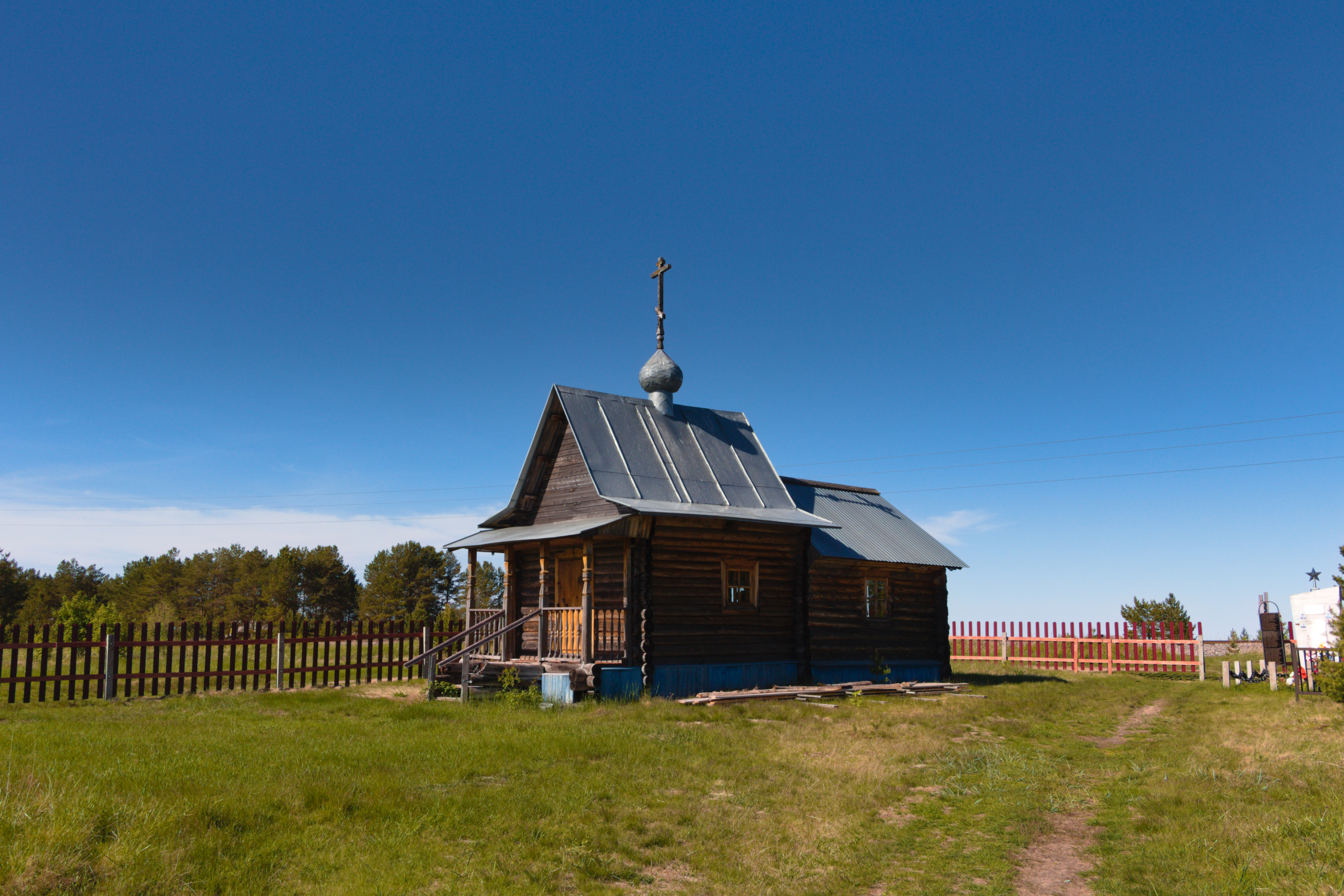
Eukterion in Solza, Russia
