= Patriarch Politianus of Alexandria =

8th-century Greek Patriarch of Alexandria

Politianus served partas Greek Patriarch of Alexandria between 768 and 813. According to Eutychius, Politianus was a physician by training, visited Baghdad and healed Hārūn al-Rašīd's concubine. He reportedly participated in the translation of Vindonius Anatolius of Berytus' "Collection of Agricultural Practices" from Greek into Arabic for Yahya ibn Khalid in 795 CE.

Preceded by Cosmas I	Greek Patriarch of Alexandria; 768–813	Succeeded by Eustatius
