= Skaramangion =

Ancient garment in the Byzantine Empire

The skaramangion (Ancient Greek: σκαραμάγγιον) was a caftan-like tunic in the Byzantine Empire.

The garment was likely of Persian origin, and took the form of a long-sleeved tunic, worn belted, with slits on front and back or the sides, indicating a likely origin as a rider's garment.

The garment was popular among Byzantine courtiers, and became the main everyday court uniform of the middle Byzantine period, along with the sagion cloak. The Byzantine emperors alone had the right to wear skaramangia of imperial purple, but red and golden variants were also worn by emperors. Surviving depictions show the garment made of silk, with gold armbands and a gold border along the hem and slits.

According to Liutprand of Cremona, skaramangia were used as diplomatic gifts by the emperors.

== Sources ==
- Parani, Maria G. (2003). Reconstructing the Reality of Images: Byzantine Material Culture and Religious Iconography (11th to 15th Centuries). Leiden, South Holland: Brill. ISBN 978-90-04-12462-2.
- Ševčenko, Nancy Patterson (1991). "Skaramangion". In Kazhdan, Alexander (ed.). The Oxford Dictionary of Byzantium. Oxford and New York: Oxford University Press. p. 1908. ISBN 0-19-504652-8.
