= Dimiter Angelov (academic) =

Bulgarian-American historian

- Occupation: Historian

Academic background
- Education: Wabash College (BA); Harvard University (PhD)

Academic work
- Discipline: History
- Sub-discipline: Byzantine history
- Institutions: University of Birmingham; Harvard University

Dimiter Angelov (born 1972) is a Bulgarian-American Byzantinist and professor of history at Harvard University, where he is the Dumbarton Oaks Professor of Byzantine History.

== Biography ==
Angelov was raised in Bulgaria and studied in the United States, earning his bachelor's degree from Wabash College, before attending Harvard University, where he earned his PhD in 2002. He became a professor at the University of Birmingham for ten years before joining the faculty at Harvard, where he became the Dumbarton Oaks Professor of Byzantine History.

His primary research focuses on Byzantine history and geography, and the role of the Byzantine Empire in the world. He is one of the leading experts on Theodore Laskaris, and is one of the first academics to translate Laskaris's writings. He has also written about the ritual importance of the Byzantine coronation, the Byzantine navy, and the Crusades.

== Books ==
=== As author ===
- Angelov, Dimiter (2007). Imperial Ideology and Political Thought in Byzantium, 1204–1330. Cambridge: Cambridge University Press. ISBN 978-0-521-85703-1.
- Macrides, Ruth; Munitiz, J. A.; Angelov, Dimiter (2013). Pseudo-Kodinos and the Constantinopolitan Court: Offices and Ceremonies. Farnham: Ashgate. ISBN 978-0-7546-6752-0.
- Angelov, Dimiter (2019). The Byzantine Hellene. The Life of Emperor Theodore Laskaris and Byzantium in the Thirteenth Century. Cambridge: Cambridge University Press. ISBN 978-1-108-48071-0.

=== As editor ===
- Angelov, Dimiter, ed. (2009). Church and Society in Late Byzantium. Kalamazoo: Medieval institute publications, Western Michigan university. ISBN 978-1-58044-142-1.
- Angelov, Dimiter; Saxby, Michael, eds. (2013). Power and Subversion in Byzantium: Papers from the 43rd Spring Symposium of Byzantine Studies, Birmingham, March 2010. Farham: Ashgate Variorum. ISBN 978-1-4724-1228-7.
- Bazzaz, Sahar; Batsaki, Yota; Angelov, Dimitir, eds. (2013). Imperial Geographies in Byzantine and Ottoman Space. Washington: Harvard University Press. ISBN 978-0-674-06662-5.
