= Leo of Synada =

Byzantine cleric

Leo of Synnada (Greek: Λεών Σύνναδας; c. 940 – after 1003) was a Byzantine cleric, diplomat and writer of the late 10th century.

== Life ==
=== Origin and family ===
Leo was born in c. 940, likely in 937. Leo and his life are known only through his letters, written during the reign of Basil II (r. 976–1025) and addressed to the emperor and various senior church and civil officials. Most of his letters have been dated to the 990s, but some may be later still.

The letters also provide some glimpses into his family: he had an uncle who was a bishop (probably also of Synnada), and a full brother. Leo had also an unnamed adoptive father, who died c. 998. This man's son, and Leo's "spiritual" brother, was the patrikios Methodios, with whom Leo evidently had a good relationship. Leo's letters reveal a good education, but not any details on how or where he got it. Likewise, his early life, including his entry into the clergy, are left unmentioned.

=== Bishop and synkellos ===
Leo became metropolitan bishop of Synada in Phrygia some time before 996, and no earlier than 976. By 996, he also served as synkellos of the Patriarch of Constantinople. The patriarchal see had been vacant since 991, but when the synod convened to elect a new patriarch in March/April 996, Leo was not present, not making it to the capital in time. Despite his protests to Emperor, the election went ahead, and Sisinnios II was chosen.

=== Diplomatic mission ===
In 996–998, he was sent on a long diplomatic mission to the West: In August–October 997 he crossed "Frankia" (the Holy Roman Empire under Otto III) to negotiate a marriage alliance with Constantinople, before beginning the return journey to Rome in November 997. He stayed in Rome in February–May 998, where he supported the antipope John Philagathos, despite his strong personal dislike of the man. He sailed from Otranto in mid-autumn 998 and returned to Constantinople.

=== Last years ===
He wrote his testament at the age of 66, i.e., in the year 1003. Nothing further is known about him after that. According to Alexander Kazhdan, "mild humor and sarcasm fill the letters and esp. Leo's will, written at the age of 66", where he "calculates the number of his sins at 48,180".

== Sources ==
- Kazhdan, Alexander (1991). "Leo of Synada". In Kazhdan, Alexander (ed.). The Oxford Dictionary of Byzantium. Oxford and New York: Oxford University Press. pp. 1215–1216. ISBN 0-19-504652-8.
- Lilie, Ralph-Johannes; Ludwig, Claudia; Pratsch, Thomas; Zielke, Beate (2013). Prosopographie der mittelbyzantinischen Zeit Online. Berlin-Brandenburgische Akademie der Wissenschaften. Nach Vorarbeiten F. Winkelmanns erstellt (in German). Berlin and Boston: De Gruyter.
