= Sisinnius II of Constantinople =

Ecumenical Patriarch of Constantinople from 996 to 998

- Ecumenical Patriarch of Constantinople
- Church: Church of Constantinople
- In office: 12 April 996
- Predecessor: Nicholas II of Constantinople
- Successor: Sergius II of Constantinople

Personal details
- Died: 24 August 998
- Denomination: Chalcedonian Christianity

Sisinnius II of Constantinople (Greek: Σισίννιος, romanized: Sisinnios; died 24 August 998) became Ecumenical Patriarch of Constantinople in 996 and held the post until his death in 998.

According to the histories of John Skylitzes and Joannes Zonaras, he was extremely well educated, particularly in medical matters, and had been honoured with the office of magistros. He was elected to the patriarchate on 12 April 996, after the see had remained vacant for more than four years, due to the preoccupation of Emperor Basil II with his wars against the Bulgarians.

On 21 February 997, he issued a tomos on prohibiting marriage between persons related to the fifth or sixth degree. These regulations are soon after attested in juridical decisions but appear to have also caused some opposition (Logos Antirrhetikos of Skribas Nikolaos, c. 1030–1040). Two other canons on prohibitions related to marriages are also attributed to him, but are considered as fake by modern scholars. A later note in John Skylitzes' account also reports that Sisinnius II managed to finally lay to rest the quarrels of the tetragamy affair of Leo VI the Wise (r. 886–912). In 997–998, he also issued a typikon concerning the provision of the Metropolitan of Alania in the patriarchal monastery of Epiphanios in Kerasus. Sisinnius II was also the recipient of three letters from Leo of Synada.

He died on 24 August 998. His successor was Sergius II of Constantinople, who was elected in 1001.

== Bibliography ==
- Official website of the Ecumenic Patriarchate of Constantinople
- Lilie, Ralph-Johannes; Ludwig, Claudia; Pratsch, Thomas; Zielke, Beate (2013). Prosopographie der mittelbyzantinischen Zeit Online. Berlin-Brandenburgische Akademie der Wissenschaften. Nach Vorarbeiten F. Winkelmanns erstellt (in German). Berlin and Boston: De Gruyter.

Titles of Chalcedonian Christianity
Preceded by Nicholas II	Ecumenical Patriarch of Constantinople; 996 – 998	Succeeded by Sergius II
