= Nicholas II of Constantinople =

Ecumenical Patriarch of Constantinople from 980 to 991

Saint Nicholas II of Constantinople
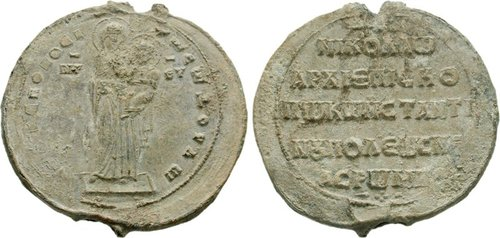
- Seal of Nicholas II of Constantinople

Ecumenical Patriarch of Constantinople
- Born: Nicholas Chrysoberges
- Died: 16 December 991; Constantinople
- Venerated in: Orthodox Church, Catholic Church
- Feast: 16 December

Saint Nicholas II of Constantinople
- Ecumenical Patriarch of Constantinople
- Installed: April 980
- Term ended: 16 December 991
- Predecessor: Anthony III of Constantinople
- Successor: Sisinnius II of Constantinople

Personal details
- Denomination: Eastern Orthodox, Chalcedonian Christianity

Nicholas II of Constantinople (Nicholas Chrysoberges Greek: Νικόλαος Χρυσοβέργης; (Note: Chrysoberges meaning "golden wand") died 16 December 991) was Ecumenical Patriarch of Constantinople from 980 to 991.

== Life ==
In 980, during the reign of Emperor Basil II, when Nicholas II was Ecumenical Patriarch, the Archangel Gabriel was believed to have appeared in the guise of a monk to the disciple of a certain monk at the Monastery of the Pantocrator in Mount Athos. The monk reported that the angel sang a new verse of the matins hymn, recorded on a slate still held at the monastery. Nicholas II received the relic in the cathedral of Hagia Sophia. The Axion Estin is still sung in Orthodox services.

Nicholas II's tenure also saw the completion of the Christianisation of Kievan Rus' and the appointment of the first metropolitan for Rus', Michael I of Kiev.

Patriarch Nicholas II was later canonised and is commemorated by both the Catholic Church and the Eastern Orthodox Church on 16 December.

== Notes and references ==
=== References ===
Titles of Chalcedonian Christianity
Preceded by Anthony III	Ecumenical Patriarch of Constantinople; 980 – 991	Succeeded by Sisinnius II
