= Antony III of Constantinople =

Ecumenical Patriarch of Constantinople from 973 to 978

- Ecumenical Patriarch of Constantinople
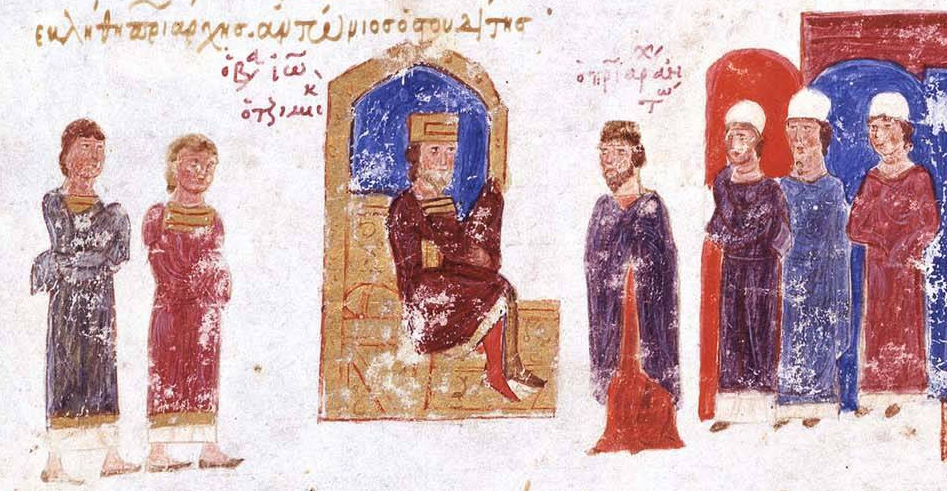
- Installed: December 973
- Term ended: June 978
- Predecessor: Basil I of Constantinople
- Successor: Nicholas II of Constantinople

Personal details
- Died: 983 Constantinople
- Denomination: Chalcedonian Christianity

Anthony III Stoudites (Greek: Ἀντώνιος Στουδίτης; died in 983) was a Greek monk member of the Monastery of Stoudios (founded 462), and the Ecumenical Patriarch of Constantinople from 973 to 978. He died in Constantinople in 983.

== Notes and references ==
Titles of Chalcedonian Christianity
Preceded by Basil I	Ecumenical Patriarch of Constantinople; 974 – 979	Succeeded by Nicholas II
