= Sergius II of Constantinople =

Ecumenical Patriarch of Constantinople from 1001 to 1019

- Ecumenical Patriarch of Constantinople
- Church: Church of Constantinople
- In office: June/July 1001
- Predecessor: Sisinnius II of Constantinople
- Successor: Eustathius of Constantinople

Personal details
- Died: July 1019
- Denomination: Chalcedonian Christianity

Sergius II of Constantinople (Greek: Σέργιος Β′; died July 1019) was the Ecumenical Patriarch of Constantinople from July 1001 to 1019.

According to the history of John Skylitzes, he was a relative of the celebrated 9th-century patriarch Photius I. In 1001, he was abbot of the Monastery of Manuel, which had been re-founded by Photius I, when he was elected to fill the patriarchal see (June/July 1001).

According to the later legend, Sergius II was in the conflict with the Pope Sergius IV.

According to John Skylitzes, he died in July 1019. His successor was Eustathius.

== Bibliography ==
- Official website of the Ecumenic Patriarchate of Constantinople.
- Lilie, Ralph-Johannes; Ludwig, Claudia; Pratsch, Thomas; Zielke, Beate (2013). Prosopographie der mittelbyzantinischen Zeit Online. Berlin-Brandenburgische Akademie der Wissenschaften. Nach Vorarbeiten F. Winkelmanns erstellt (in German). Berlin and Boston: De Gruyter.

Titles of Chalcedonian Christianity
Preceded by Sisinnius II	Ecumenical Patriarch of Constantinople; 1001 – 1019	Succeeded by Eustathius
