= Patriarch Christopher I of Alexandria =

9th-century Greek Patriarch of Alexandria

Christopher I served as Greek Patriarch of Alexandria between 817 and 841.

Preceded by Eustatius	Greek Patriarch of Alexandria; 817–841	Succeeded by Sophronius I
