= Polyeuctus of Constantinople =

Ecumenical Patriarch of Constantinople from 956 to 970

- Ecumenical Patriarch of Constantinople
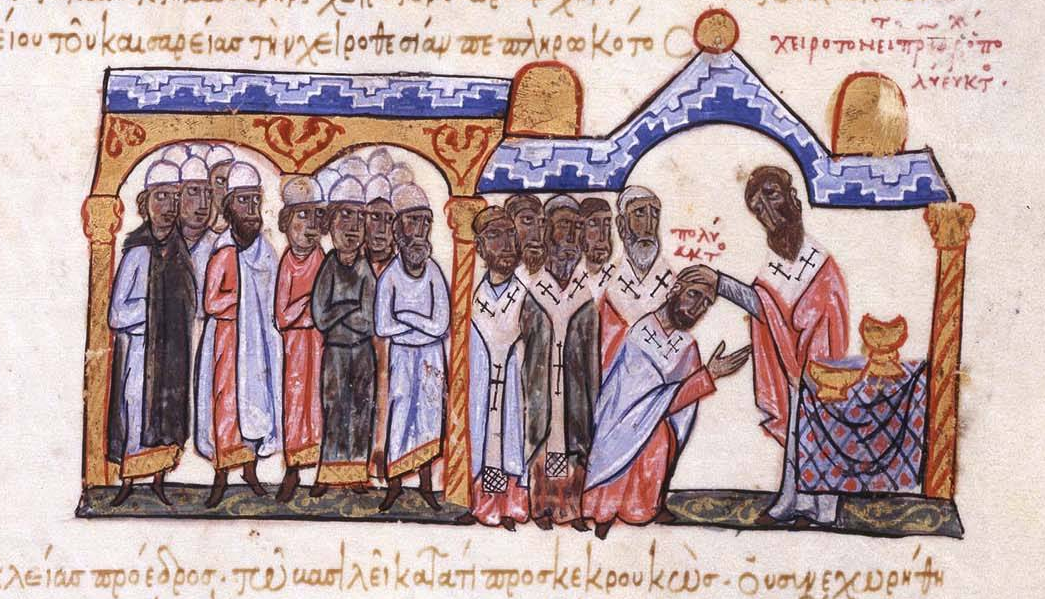
- Consecration of Polyeuctus, from the Madrid Skylitzes
- See: Constantinople
- Installed: 3 April 956
- Term ended: 5 February 970
- Predecessor: Theophylact of Constantinople
- Successor: Basil I of Constantinople

Personal details
- Died: 5 February 970
- Denomination: Chalcedonian Christianity

Polyeuctus of Constantinople (Greek: Πολύευκτος; died 5 February 970) was Ecumenical Patriarch of Constantinople (956–970). His orthodox feast is on 5 February.

== History ==
Polyeuctus was raised from being a simple monk to the Patriarchate in 956, as successor to the imperial prince Theophylact Lekapenos, and remained on the patriarchal throne in Constantinople until his death on 5 February 970. For his great mind, zeal for the Faith and power of oratory, he was called a "second Chrysostom".

Although he was given his position by Constantine VII, he did not show much loyalty to him. He began by questioning the legitimacy of Constantine's parents' marriage and then went as far as to restore the good name of Patriarch Euthymius I who had so vigorously opposed that union.

The Russian Princess Saint Olga came to Constantinople in the time of Patriarch Polyeuctus during the reign of Byzantine Emperor Constantine VII and was baptised there in 957. The Patriarch baptised her, and the Emperor stood godfather. St Polyeuctus prophesied: "Blessed are you among Russian women, for you have loved light and cast off darkness; the sons of Russia will bless you to the last generation."

He raised bishop Petrus of Otranto (958) to the dignity of metropolitan, with the obligation to establish the Greek Rite throughout the province; the Latin Rite was introduced again after the Norman conquest, but the Greek Rite remained in use in several towns of the archdiocese and of its suffragans, until the 16th century.

Although he had supported his rise to the throne, against the machinations of Joseph Bringas, Polyeuctus excommunicated Emperor Nikephoros II Phokas for having married Theophano on the grounds that he had been the godfather to one or more of her sons. He had previously refused Nikephoras communion for a whole year for the sin of having contracted a second marriage after the death of his first wife.

He excommunicated the assassins of the Emperor Nikephoros II Phokas and refused to crown the new Emperor John I Tzimiskes, nephew of the late Emperor (and one of the assassins) until he punished the assassins and exiled his lover Empress Theophano who allegedly organised her husband's assassination.

== Notes and references ==
Titles of Chalcedonian Christianity
Preceded by Theophylact	Ecumenical Patriarch of Constantinople; 956 – 970	Succeeded by Basil I
