= Ignaty Smolnyanin =

Russian pilgrim (fl. 1389 – c. 1405)

Ignaty or Ignatius Smolnyanin (also spelled as Smolyanin; (Note: Russian: Игнатий Смолянин.) Russian: Игнатий Смольнянин, lit. 'Ignaty of Smolensk'; fl. 1389 – c. 1405) was a Russian pilgrim from Smolensk. He wrote a description of his journey to the Holy Land.

== Life ==
Little is known about his life. Three works are attributed to Ignaty: Journey to Constantinople (1389), the Abbreviated Chronicle (c. 1402), and the Description of Thessaloniki and the Holy Mountain (c. 1405). The evidence suggests that he came from western Russia, specifically Smolensk, and traveled to Constantinople with Michael, the bishop of Smolensk, possibly remaining there until around 1392. It is not known whether he returned to Russia or stayed in the Balkans, as his Abbreviated Chronicle mentions the 1396 earthquake at Mount Athos and the 1404 fire at the Great Lavra. He also left an account of the Holy Edicule in Jerusalem, although it provides limited detail.

Although he has been referred to as a deacon or archdeacon, he was not ordained, or at least, not until his final years, as he referred to himself as a simple monk in his writings.

== Sources ==
- "Игнатий, древнерусский путешественник" . Brockhaus and Efron Encyclopedic Dictionary (in Russian). 1906.
- Grinevetsky, Sergei R.; Zonn, Igor S.; Zhiltsov, Sergei S.; Kosarev, Aleksey N.; Kostianoy, Andrey G., eds. (30 September 2014). "Black Sea, names". The Black Sea Encyclopedia. Springer. pp. 132–133. ISBN 978-3-642-55227-4.
- Kirillin, Vladimir M. (2022). "Гроб Господень глазами древнерусских паломников XII–XVII вв" [Holy Sepulchre through the Eyes of Old Russian Pilgrims of the 12th–17th Centuries]. Hermeneutics of Old Russian Literature. 21: 368–411. doi:10.22455/HORL.1607-6192-2022-21-368-411.
- Rautman, Marcus L. (1991). "Ignatius of Smolensk and the Late Byzantine Monasteries of Thessaloniki". Revue des études byzantines. 49 (1). Institut Français d'Études Byzantines: 143–169. doi:10.3406/rebyz.1991.1838.
- Turilov, A. A.; Fyodorova, I. V. (2009). "Игнатий Смольнянин". Православная энциклопедия. Т. XXI: Иверская икона Божией матери — Икиматарий (in Russian). Moscow: Православная энциклопедия. pp. 151–152. ISBN 978-5-89572-038-7.
