= Patriarch Sophronius I of Alexandria =

9th-century Greek Patriarch of Alexandria

Sophronius I (Greek: Σωφρόνιος, romanized: Sōphronios) served as Greek Patriarch of Alexandria between 841 and 860.

Preceded by Christopher I	Greek Patriarch of Alexandria; 841–860	Succeeded by Michael I
