= Eustathius of Constantinople =

Ecumenical Patriarch of Constantinople from 1019 to 1025

Saint Eustathius of Constantinople

Ecumenical Patriarch of Constantinople
- Venerated in: Eastern Orthodox Church
- Feast: 31 May

Saint Eustathius of Constantinople
- Ecumenical Patriarch of Constantinople
- Installed: July 1019
- Term ended: November 1025
- Predecessor: Sergius II of Constantinople
- Successor: Alexius of Constantinople

Personal details
- Born: 10th century
- Died: November 1025
- Denomination: Chalcedonian Christianity

Eustathius of Constantinople (Greek: Εὐστάθιος; died November 1025) was Ecumenical Patriarch of Constantinople from July 1019 to November 1025.

Eustathius was the protopresbyter of the imperial palace when he was raised to the Patriarchal throne by the Emperor Basil II, after the death of Sergius II. Eustathius participated in the efforts of the Byzantines in 1024 to come to an accommodation with the Latin Papacy concerning the widening gap between the Western and Eastern churches, which culminated in the Schism of 1054. At the time of Eustathius, the Papacy claimed dominion over the Christian world, not just primacy, a position which offended Constantinople, the effective spiritual guides of much of the East to include the Russians, Bulgarians and Serbs. Eustathius offered a compromise to Pope John XIX, suggesting that the Orthodox Patriarch would be ecumenic in its own sphere (in suo orbe) in the East as the Papacy was in the world (in universo). It is assumed this was Eustathius' effort to retain control over the Southern Italian churches. While the offer was rejected, there was an acceptance by Pope John XIX of the practice of the Byzantine Rite in the south of Italy in exchange for the establishment of Latin Rite churches in Constantinople.

His successor was Alexius of Constantinople.

== Bibliography ==
- Charles Previté-Orton, The Shorter Cambridge Medieval History, Vol. 1, Cambridge University Press, 1979.
- Steven Runciman, Byzantine Civilisation, London, University Paperback, 1961.
- Joan M. Hussey, The Orthodox Church in the Byzantine Empire, Oxford, Clarendon Press, 1986.

Titles of Chalcedonian Christianity
Preceded by Sergius II	Ecumenical Patriarch of Constantinople; 1019 – 1025	Succeeded by Alexius I
