= Sagum =

Roman military garment

Roman soldier wearing a sagum.

The sagum was a garment of note generally worn by members of the Roman military during both the Republic and early Empire. Regarded symbolically as a garment of war by the same tradition which embraced the toga as one of peace, it was slightly more practical, consisting of a simple rectangular segment of cloth fastened by a leather or metal clasp and worn on top of the armor. The fabric was unwashed wool, saturated with lanolin (which made it water-resistant); it was traditionally dyed bright red.
