= Patriarch Eustatius of Alexandria =

9th-century Greek Patriarch of Alexandria

Eustatius served as Greek Patriarch of Alexandria between 813 and 817.

Preceded by Politianus	Greek Patriarch of Alexandria; 813–817	Succeeded by Christopher I
