= Basil I of Constantinople =

Ecumenical Patriarch of Constantinople from 970 to 974

- Ecumenical Patriarch of Constantinople
- Installed: 13 February 970
- Term ended: October 973
- Predecessor: Polyeuctus of Constantinople
- Successor: Antony III of Constantinople

Personal details
- Died: March 974
- Denomination: Chalcedonian Christianity

Basil I of Constantinople, surnamed Scamandrenus or Skamandrenos (Greek: Βασίλειος Σκαμανδρηνός; died March 974), from the Skamandros Monastery, which he founded, was Ecumenical Patriarch of Constantinople from 970 to 974. Before his election as Patriarch, he was a monk in Olympus of Syria and continued his monastic life after his election. As a Patriarch, he was accused as a conspirator against the Emperor John I Tzimiskes and as a violator of holy rules, but he refused to appear in front of a royal court. He was exiled and went to the Skamandros Monastery, where he died.

During his patriarchate, the so-called Tragos, the first Charter of the monastical state of Mount Athos, was written and ratified. It was named after the animal whose skin was used for the parchment on which the text was written, namely a male goat.

== Notes and references ==
Titles of Chalcedonian Christianity
Preceded by Polyeuctus	Ecumenical Patriarch of Constantinople; 970 – 974	Succeeded by Antony III
