= Alexius of Constantinople =

Ecumenical Patriarch of Constantinople from 1025 to 1043

- Ecumenical Patriarch of Constantinople
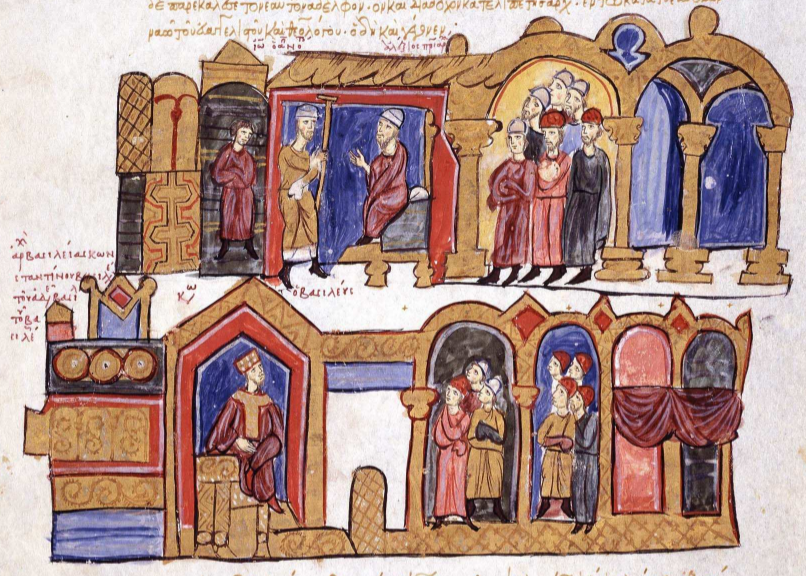
- Appointment of Alexius of Constantinople as patriarch (top) by Emperor Constantine VIII (below)
- Church: Church of Constantinople
- In office: 15 December 1025 – 20 February 1043
- Predecessor: Eustathius of Constantinople
- Successor: Michael I of Constantinople

Personal details
- Died: 20 February 1043
- Denomination: Chalcedonian Christianity

Alexius of Constantinople (Alexius Stoudites Greek: Ἀλέξιος ὁ Στουδίτης; died 20 February 1043), an ecumenical patriarch of Constantinople, was a member of the Monastery of Stoudios (founded 462), succeeded Eustathius of Constantinople as patriarch in 1025, the last of the patriarchs appointed by Emperor Basil II.

== Patriarchate ==
Alexius set out to reform the church institution of the charistike dorea (donation), which recent research dates to the period just after the Feast of Orthodoxy (843). Effectively, it involved the donation of monasteries to private individuals unrelated to the establishments founders, for a limited period of time. Ostensibly undertaken so that the monastery buildings could be repaired or conserved and the estate out to good use, while at the same time protecting and preserving its spiritual functions, in actuality it was widely abused by the landed gentry and so became a source of abused patronage by high church officials and a tool against the powerful monastic establishment. Alexius tried to temper the worst abused of the notorious charistike by appointing through Synodal legislation the patriarch's chancellor, the chartophylax, as the official to serve as the final point of approval for all grants under the system. Alexius also restricted the granting of charistike to nondiocesan monasteries and eukteria. The fact that Alexius sought reform over abolishment of the charistike dorea likely shows the inability of the Church to claim back many of these properties from the powerful land-owning elite who held them.

Alexius promoted the zealous actions of John of Melitene whose interest it was to limit the influence of the Syro Jacobite Church in the south east of the Byzantine Empire, especially in the newly conquered themes of Mesopotamia and Telouch. For this reason, the Syro-Jacobite Patriarch John VIII bar Abdoun was arrested and brought to trial in Constantinople and then forced into a monastery on Mount Ganos. In 1034 he crowned Emperor Michael IV the Paphlagonian, the favorite of the Byzantine Empress Zoë Porphyrogenita, who, to make way for him, procured the death of her husband, the Emperor Romanos III Argyros. He thwarted the attempts of John the Orphanotrophos (the emperor's brother) to gain the patriarchal see in 1036 and died in 1043.

== Typikon ==
Alexius also established a monastery for which he wrote the rule (typikon) which was then used as the rule for the Kyiv Monastery of the Caves.

Decrees of Alexius are still extant. He is noted for the elevated style employed in the numerous decrees of his which have survived.

== Synod decrees ==
The synod decrees are unusual for their number and the fact they are dated precisely:

- 1027 (Grumel 832)
- 1027 (Grumel 833)
- 1027–1030 (Grumel 834)
- 1028 (Grumel 835)
- 1030 (Grumel 839)
- 1038 (Grumel 840)
- 1034 (Grumel 841)
- 1037 (Grumel 842)
- 1038 (Grumel 844)
- 1038 (Grumel 845)
- 1039 (Grumel 846)
- 1030–1040 (Grumel 848)
- Undated (Grumel 847, 849, 850)

== Bibliography ==
- F. Lauritzen, Against the Enemies of Tradition, Alexios Studites and the Synodikon of Orthodoxy, in A. Rigo and P. Ermilov, Orthodoxy and Heresy in Byzantium, Roma, 2010.
- J. Thomas and A. Constantinides, Byzantine Monastic Foundation Documents, Washington, D.C., Dumbarton Oaks, 1998.
- A. Pentkovsky, Typikon Patriarxa Aleksija Studita v Vizantii i na Rusi, Moscow, 2001.

Titles of Chalcedonian Christianity
Preceded by Eustathius	Ecumenical Patriarch of Constantinople; 1025 – 1043	Succeeded by Michael I
