= March 30 (Eastern Orthodox liturgics) =

Day in the Eastern Orthodox liturgical calendar

Eastern Orthodox liturgical calendar
March 29	March 30	March 31
March 30 O.S. ≍ April 12 N.S. March 30 N.S ≍ March 17 O.S.

An Eastern Orthodox cross

March 30 in Eastern Orthodox liturgical calendars is a feast day and a day of commemoration of saints and martyrs. Although some Orthodox churches use the Revised Julian Calendar and others use the traditional Julian calendar, the fixed commemorations for their respective March 30 are broadly the same, no matter which calendar is used. (Note: Despite the dates being the same, the days to which they refer typically differ by 13 days. The notation Old Style or O.S. is sometimes used to indicate a date in the traditional Julian Calendar (the "Old Calendar"). The notation New Style or N.S. indicates a date in the Revised Julian calendar (the "New Calendar").)

== Saints ==
- Prophet Joad (III Kings 13:11), who dwelt in Bethel (10th century BC)
- Holy Apostles Sosthenes, Apollos, Cephas, Caesar, and Epaphroditus, of the Seventy (1st century) (see also: December 8 and January 4)
- Saint Eubula, mother of St. Panteleimon (304)
- Venerable John the Hermit of Cilicia (4th century) (Note: According to the Greek Synaxarion, the Venerable John fled to the Egyptian desert due to the persecution against the Christians. He lived in a dry well, where he was fed by the ascetics of the desert. He passed his life in prayer and fasting, and reposed in peace.)
- Saint John II, Patriarch of Jerusalem (5th century)
- Venerable John the Silent (John Hesychastes), Bishop of Colonia (Taxara) in Armenia, and later a monk of St. Sabbas Monastery (558) (see also: December 3)
- Venerable John Climacus of Sinai, author of The Ladder of Divine Ascent (615)
- Venerable Zosimas, Bishop of Syracuse (662) (Note: "At the age of seven he was taken to the monastery of Santa Lucia near Syracuse in Sicily. After thirty years as a monk, he was successively made abbot and bishop of the city. He reposed at the age of ninety.") (see also: January 21)

== Pre-Schism Western saints ==
- Saint Quirinus, the jailer of Pope Alexander I, martyr (c. 117) (Note: The jailer of Pope Alexander I, by whom he was converted with his daughter St Balbina. Shortly afterwards he was martyred in Rome under Hadrian.)
- Saint Regulus (Rieul), by tradition a Greek, he is honoured as the first Bishop of Senlis in France (c. 260)
- Saint Mamertinus of Auxerre, a monk and then Abbot of Sts Cosmas and Damian in Auxerre in France (c. 462)
- Saint Fergus, Bishop of Downpatrick in Ireland (6th century)
- Saint Pastor, Bishop of Orleans in France (6th century)
- Saint Tola of Clonard, Abbot and Bishop of Disert Tola in Meath in Ireland (c. 733)
- Saint Patto (Pacificus), Bishop of Werden in Germany (c. 788) (Note: Perhaps born in Ireland, he went to Saxony, became abbot of a monastery there and finally became Bishop of Werden in Germany.)
- Saint Clinius, a Greek monk of Monte Cassino, he became Abbot of St Peter's near Pontecorvo, where his relics were venerated.
- Saint Osburga of Coventry, Abbess and Virgin (c. 1015) (Note: First abbess of the convent founded by King Canute in Coventry in England.)

== Post-Schism Orthodox saints ==
- New Hieromartyr Zachariah, Metropolitan of Corinth (1684)
- Saint Sophronius, Bishop of Irkutsk (1771) (Note: See also: (in Russian) Софроний (Кристалевский). Википедии. (Russian Wikipedia).)
- Saint Gabriel (Bănulescu-Bodoni), Metropolitan of Kishinev and Khotin, Moldova (1821)

== Other commemorations ==
- The Meeting of the Mother of God and Saint Elizabeth (1st century)
- Translation of the relicts of the Martyr-King Edmund of East Anglia.
- Repose of Blessed Matrona (Mylnikova) the Barefoot, of St. Petersburg, Fool for Christ (1911) (Note: (in Russian) Матронушка-босоножка (Матрена Петровна Мыльникова)(1814 — † 30.03.1911).)

== Icon gallery ==
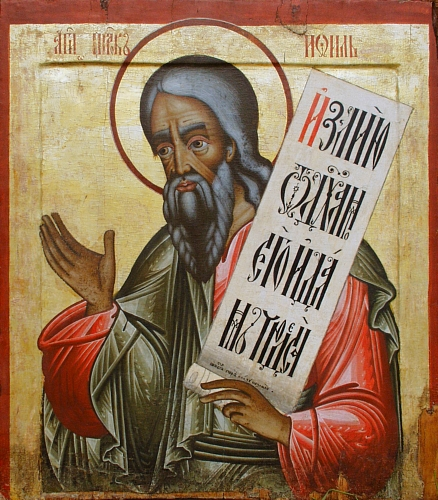
Prophet Joel, Russian icon, 18th century.

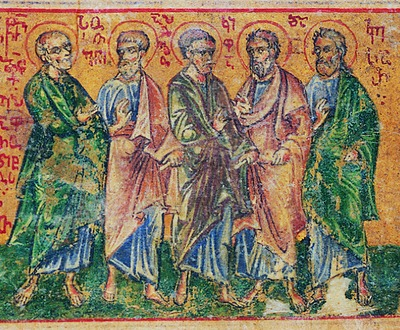
Apostles Sosthenes, Apollos, Cephas, Caesar, and Epaphroditus, of the Seventy.

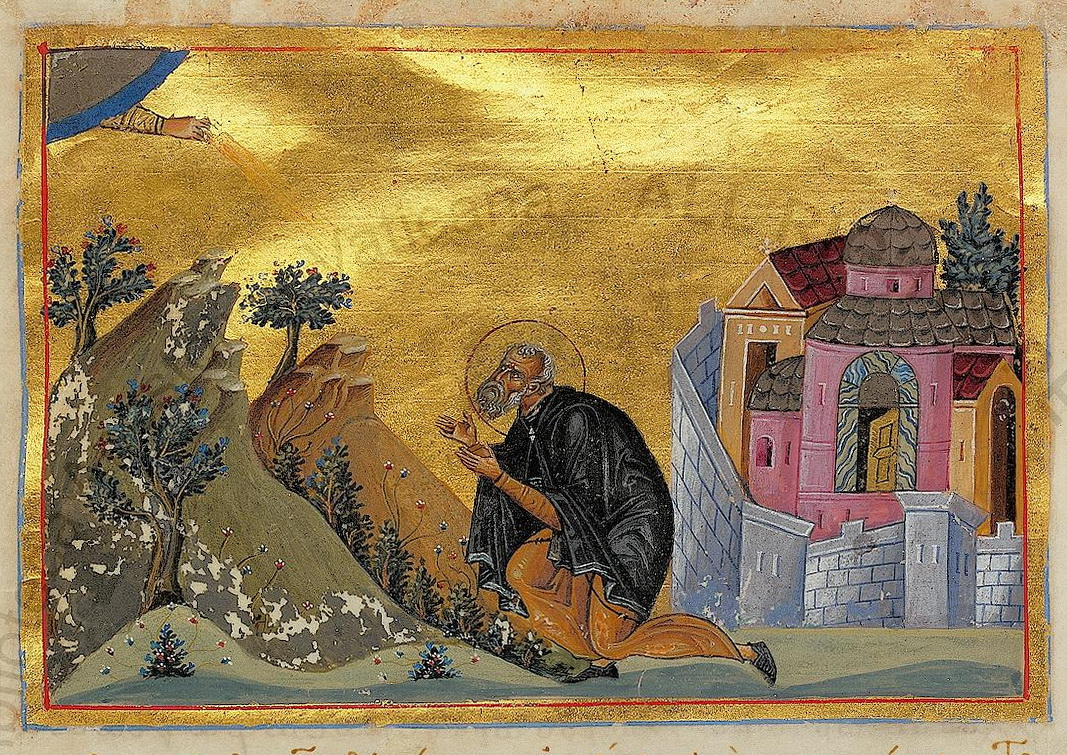
St. John the Silent, Menologion of Basil II.

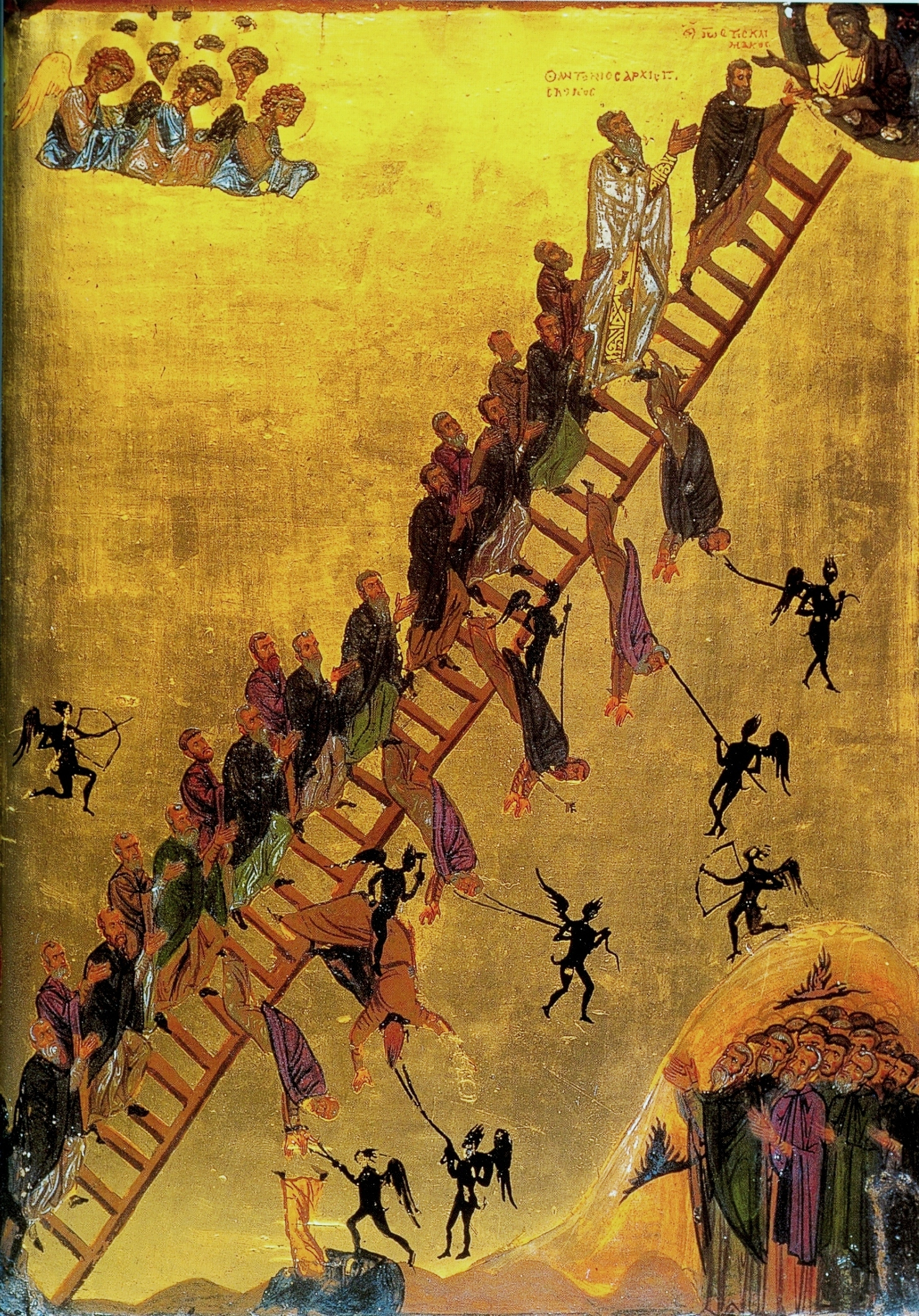
St. John Climacus is shown at the top of The Ladder of Divine Ascent, 12th-century icon.

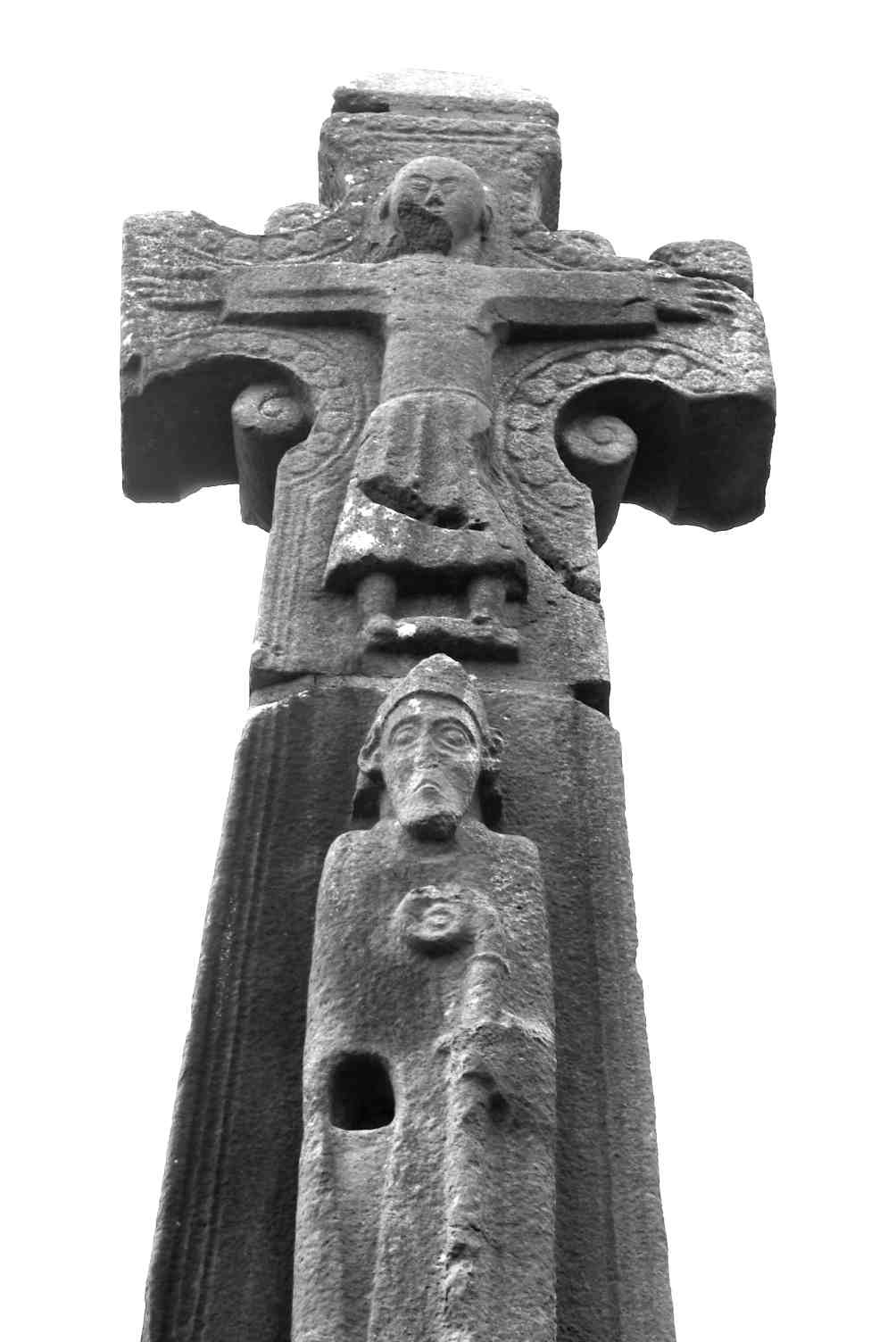
St. Tola's Cross at Dysert O'Dea Monastery.

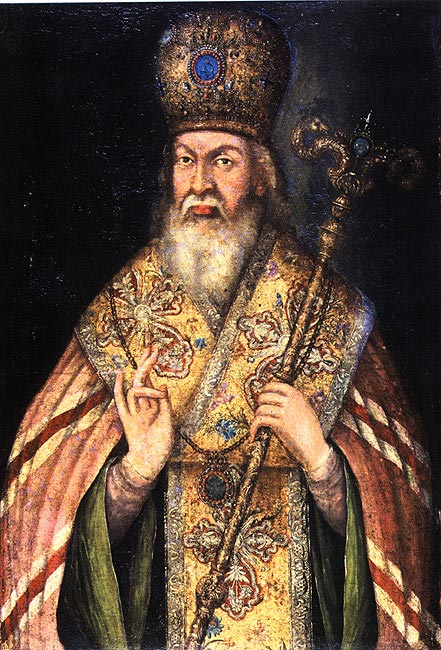
Saint Sophronius, Bishop of Irkutsk.

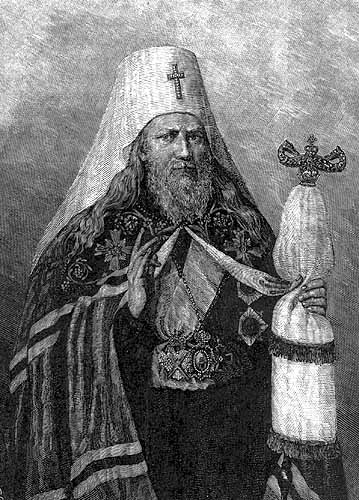
St Gabriel (Bănulescu-Bodoni).

== Sources ==
- March 30/April 12. Orthodox Calendar (PRAVOSLAVIE.RU).
- April 12 / March 30. HOLY TRINITY RUSSIAN ORTHODOX CHURCH (A parish of the Patriarchate of Moscow).
- March 30. OCA - The Lives of the Saints.
- The Autonomous Orthodox Metropolia of Western Europe and the Americas (ROCOR). St. Hilarion Calendar of Saints for the year of our Lord 2004. St. Hilarion Press (Austin, TX). p. 25.
- March 30. Latin Saints of the Orthodox Patriarchate of Rome.
- The Roman Martyrology. Transl. by the Archbishop of Baltimore. Last Edition, According to the Copy Printed at Rome in 1914. Revised Edition, with the Imprimatur of His Eminence Cardinal Gibbons. Baltimore: John Murphy Company, 1916. pp. 90–91.
- Rev. Richard Stanton. A Menology of England and Wales, or, Brief Memorials of the Ancient British and English Saints Arranged According to the Calendar, Together with the Martyrs of the 16th and 17th Centuries. London: Burns & Oates, 1892. p. 137.

Greek Sources

- Great Synaxaristes: (in Greek) 30 ΜΑΡΤΙΟΥ. ΜΕΓΑΣ ΣΥΝΑΞΑΡΙΣΤΗΣ.
- (in Greek) Συναξαριστής. 30 Μαρτίου. ECCLESIA.GR. (H ΕΚΚΛΗΣΙΑ ΤΗΣ ΕΛΛΑΔΟΣ).

Russian Sources

- (in Russian) April 12 (30 March). Православная Энциклопедия под редакцией Патриарха Московского и всея Руси Кирилла (электронная версия). (Orthodox Encyclopedia - Pravenc.ru).
- (in Russian) 30 марта (ст.ст.) 12 апреля 2013 (нов. ст.). Русская Православная Церковь Отдел внешних церковных связей. (DECR).
