= December 8 (Eastern Orthodox liturgics) =

Day in the Eastern Orthodox liturgical calendar

Eastern Orthodox liturgical calendar
December 7	December 8	December 9
December 8 O.S. ≍ December 21 N.S. December 8 N.S ≍ November 25 O.S.

An Eastern Orthodox cross

December 8 in Eastern Orthodox liturgical calendars is a feast day and a day of commemoration of saints and martyrs. Although some Orthodox churches use the Revised Julian Calendar and others use the traditional Julian calendar, the fixed commemorations for their respective December 8 are broadly the same, no matter which calendar is used. (Note: Despite the dates being the same, the days to which they refer typically differ by 13 days. The notation Old Style or O.S. is sometimes used to indicate a date in the traditional Julian Calendar (the "Old Calendar"). The notation New Style or N.S. indicates a date in the Revised Julian calendar (the "New Calendar").)

== Saints ==
- Holy Apostles of the Seventy (1st century):
  - Sosthenes, Apollos, Cephas, Tychicus, Epaphroditus, Caesar, and Onesiphorus. (Note: Saint Onesiphoros' celebration is only mentioned today in Slavic sources.)
- Holy Apostle Epaphras of the Seventy Disciples (1st century)
- Venerable Patapios (Patapius) of Thebes (4th or 7th century) (Note: The Monk Patapios was born at Thebes into a pious Christian family. Reaching the age of maturity, he had but scorn for the vanities of the world and so went off into the Egyptian wilderness. He became known for his ascetic deeds after the passing of many years. When people began to come to him for advice, he instead wished to dwell in silence. He went eventually to Constantinople, where he obtained a cell at the city wall, near the Blakhernae church. But here also he quickly became known. The sick began to throng about, and he having been vouchsafed the gift of healing, began to help all the needy.)
- Holy 362 Martyrs of Africa, martyred by the Arians (477): (Note: In the Greek Menaion these are celebrated on December 7.) (see also December 7)
  - 62 priests and 300 laymen martyred by the Arians. (Note: Martyred 62 Clergy and 300 Laymen: This occurred during the time of the Emperor Zenon (474‑491). The ruler of the Vandal kingdom in North Africa, Guneric, came under the influence of heretic Arian bishops and started up a fierce persecution against the Orthodox. When believers had gathered at one of the churches and secretly celebrated Divine Liturgy, barbarian soldiers burst into the church. Part of the worshippers fled, but 300 men – those most firm in the true faith – voluntarily gave themselves over to torture and were beheaded. Of the 62 clergy, two were burnt, and tongues were cut out from the rest. But by a miraculous Divine power they continued to preach and to oppose the Arian false-teachings.)
- Saint Victoria of Culusi (c. 484)
- Venerable Sophronius I, Bishop of Cyprus (6th century)
- Saint Damian, Bishop of Cyprus (6th-8th century)
- Venerable Aeros, Archbishop of the Church of Jerusalem. (Note: His memory is recorded in the Jerusalemitic Canonarion.)

== Pre-Schism Western saints ==
- Saint Eucharius, first Bishop of Trier in Germany (1st century or c. 250) (Note: "At Treves, St. Eucharius, disciple of the blessed apostle Peter, and first bishop of that city.")
- Saint Valerius of Trèves, second Bishop of Trier in Germany (c. 250)
- Saint Eutychian, Pope of Rome, venerated as a martyr (283) (Note: "At Rome, blessed Eutychian, pope, who with his own hands buried in various places three hundred and forty-two martyrs. Under the emperor Numerian he became their companion, being crowned with martyrdom and buried in the cemetery of Callistus.")
- Saint Valerian of Abbenza, Bishop, martyred by Vandals (457)
- Martyr Anthusa (Anthysa) at Rome (5th century) (Note: The Holy Martyress Anthysa, wife of a Roman official, was baptised by Sainted Ambrose of Mediolanum (Milan). She recoiled from the offer of the city-governor's wife Sunilda to accept Arian baptism, and so was committed to the fire.)
- Saint Budoc (Budock), Bishop of Dol and Plourin (6th century)
- Saint Romaricus, monk at Luxeuil Abbey, later founded the monastery of Habendum (Remiremont Abbey, Romarici Mons), and became the second abbot (653) (Note: "In the monastery of Luxeuil, St. Romaricus, abbot, who left the highest station at the court of king Theodobert, renounced the world, and surpassed others in the observance of monastic discipline.")
- Saint Gunthild, a nun from Wimborne in England, went to Germany and became Abbess of a convent in Thuringia (748)

== Post-Schism Orthodox saints ==
- Saint Martirius
- Saint Moskhian (10th-11th century)
- Saint Cyril, Founder and Abbot of Chelmogorsk (Chelma Hill) Monastery, Karelia, Enlightener of the Chudian People (1367) (Note: The Monk Kirill of Chelmogorsk, Enlightener of the Chudian People, was born at the city of Beloozero [White-Lake]. He took vows at the monastery of the Monk Antonii the Roman, where for 6 years he passed through various obediences. Then, after a three year wandering through the wilderness, he settled in a wild region of Kargopol'sk. And here, by a command from on high, he chose for his constant abode Mount Chelma. Many of the afflicted from among the Chud people came to check out the Monk Kirill, whose luminant ascetic life and kindly preachings moved many to an acceptance of holy Baptism. Towards the end of his life, the Monk Kirill established a monastery and church in honour of the Theophany (Bogoyavlenie) of the Lord. The monk dwelt upon Mount Chelma for 52 years and died at the advanced age of 82.)
- Saint Parthenios of Chios (1883)

=== New martyrs and confessors ===
- New Hieromartyr Michael Kiselev, Protopresbyter, of Perm (1918)
- New Hieromartyr Alexander Fedoseyev, Priest, of Perm (1918)
- New Hieromartyr John Kochurov, Priest (1918)
- New Hieromartyr Sergius Orlov (1937)

== Icon gallery ==
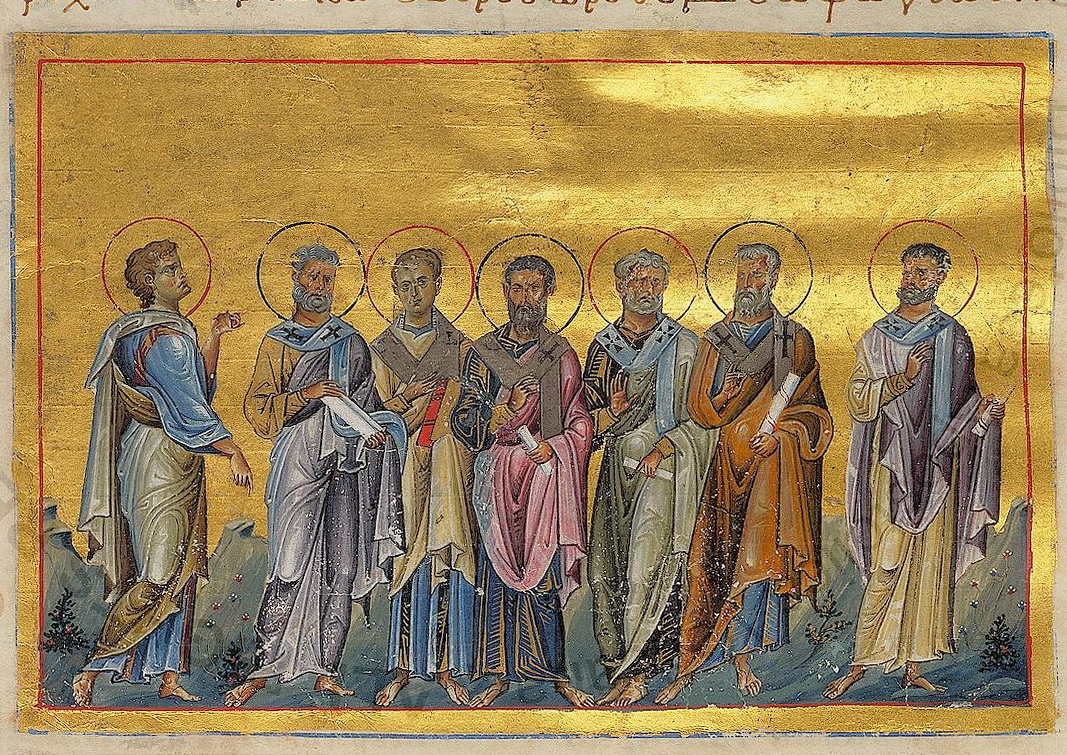
Holy Apostles of the Seventy: Sosthenes, Apollos, Cephas, Tychicus, Epaphroditus, Caesar, and Onesiphorus.
(Menologion of Basil II, 10th century).

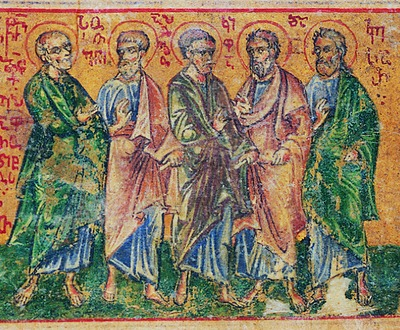
Holy Apostles Epaphroditus, Sosthenes, Apollos, Cephas and Caesar (15th-century).

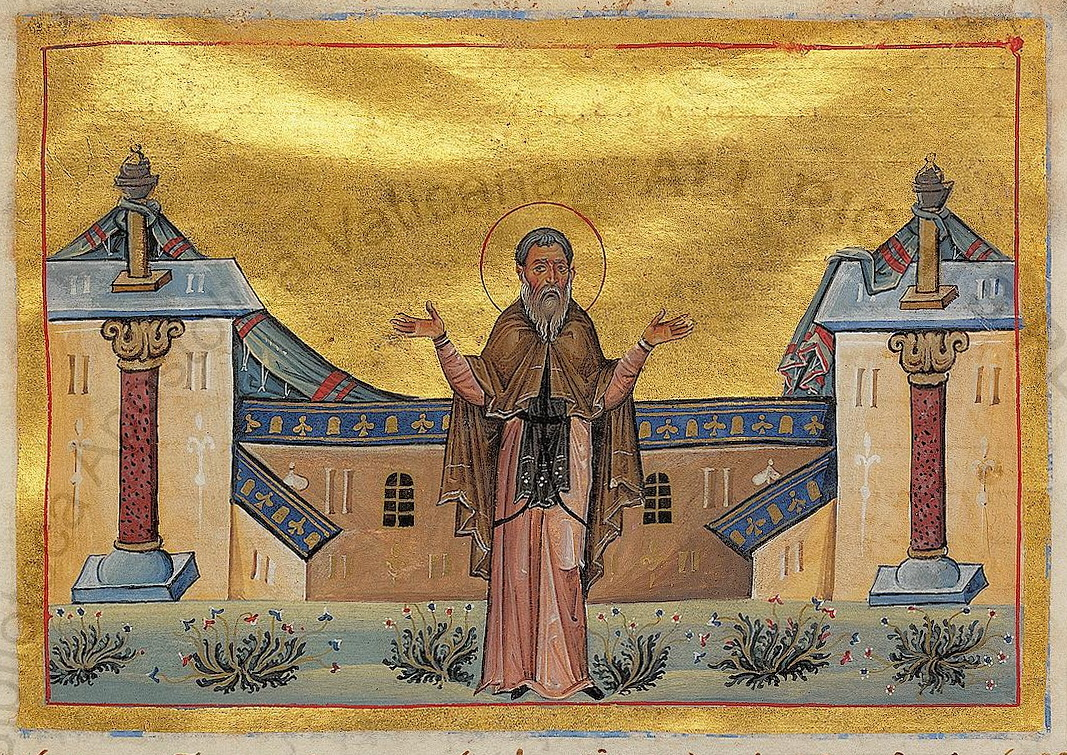
St. Patapius of Thebes.
(Menologion of Basil II, 10th century).

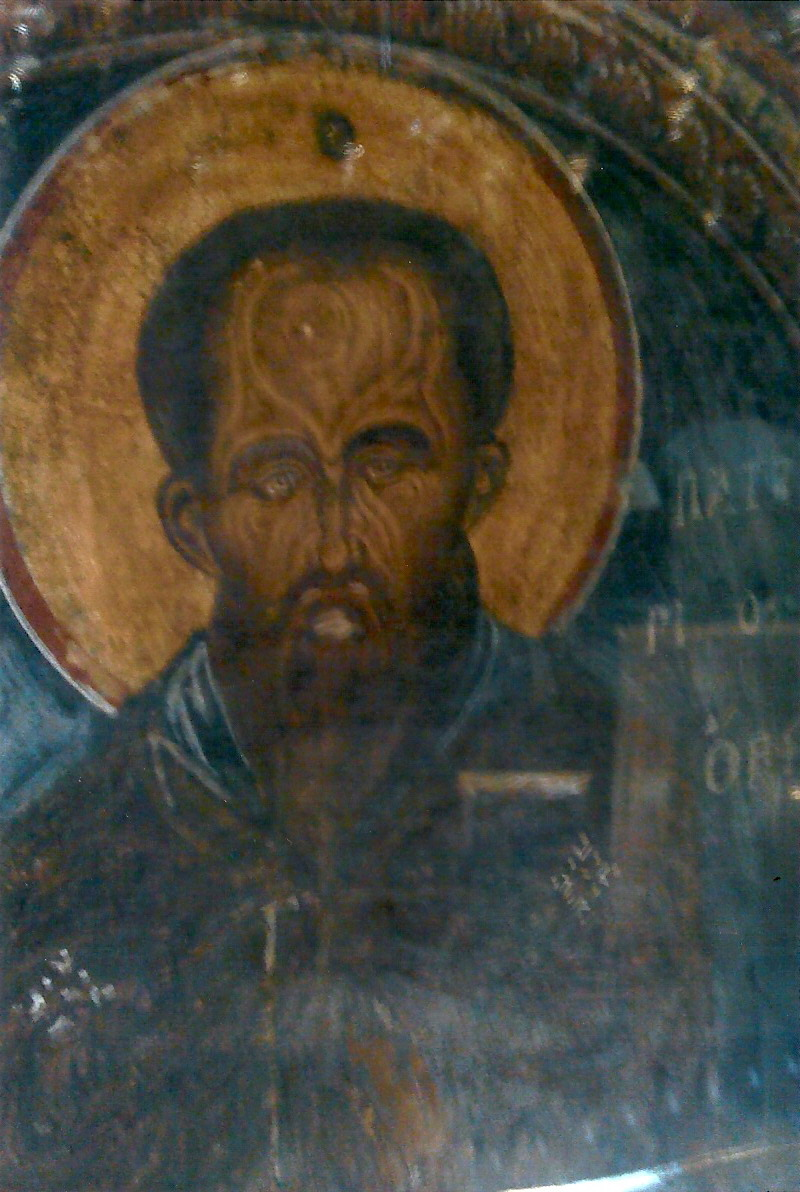
Byzantine Icon of St. Patapios found in his cave in Loutraki - Greece (15th century).

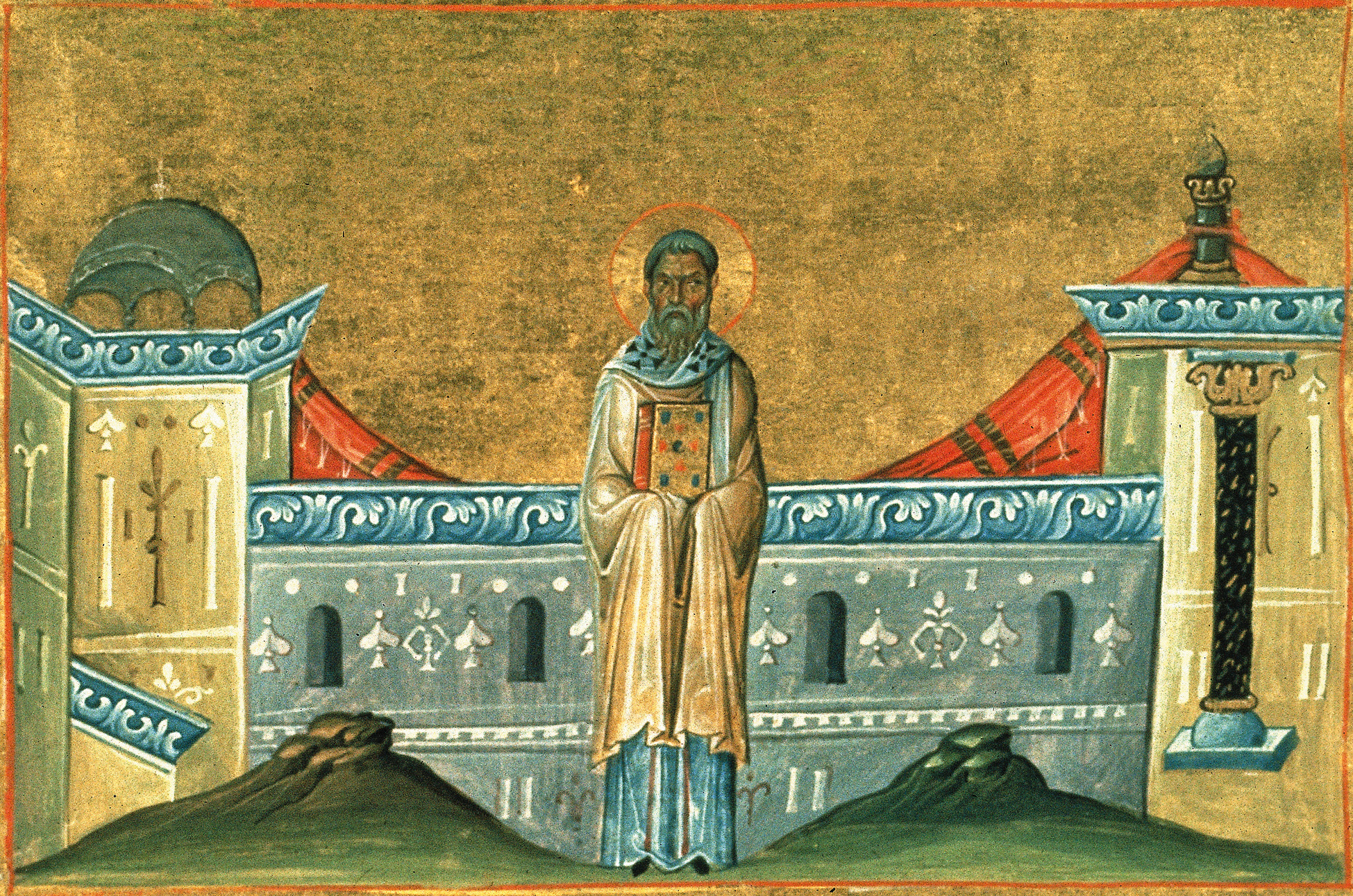
St. Sophronius, Archbishop of Cyprus.
(Menologion of Basil II, 10th century).

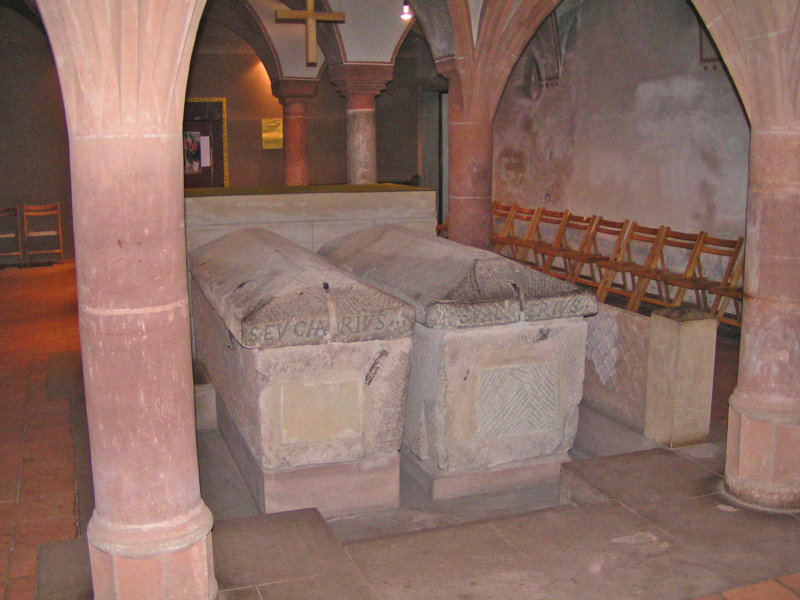
Tombs of Saints Eucharius and Valerius.
(St. Matthias Abbey, Trier).

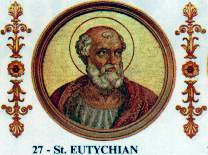
St. Eutychian, Pope of Rome.

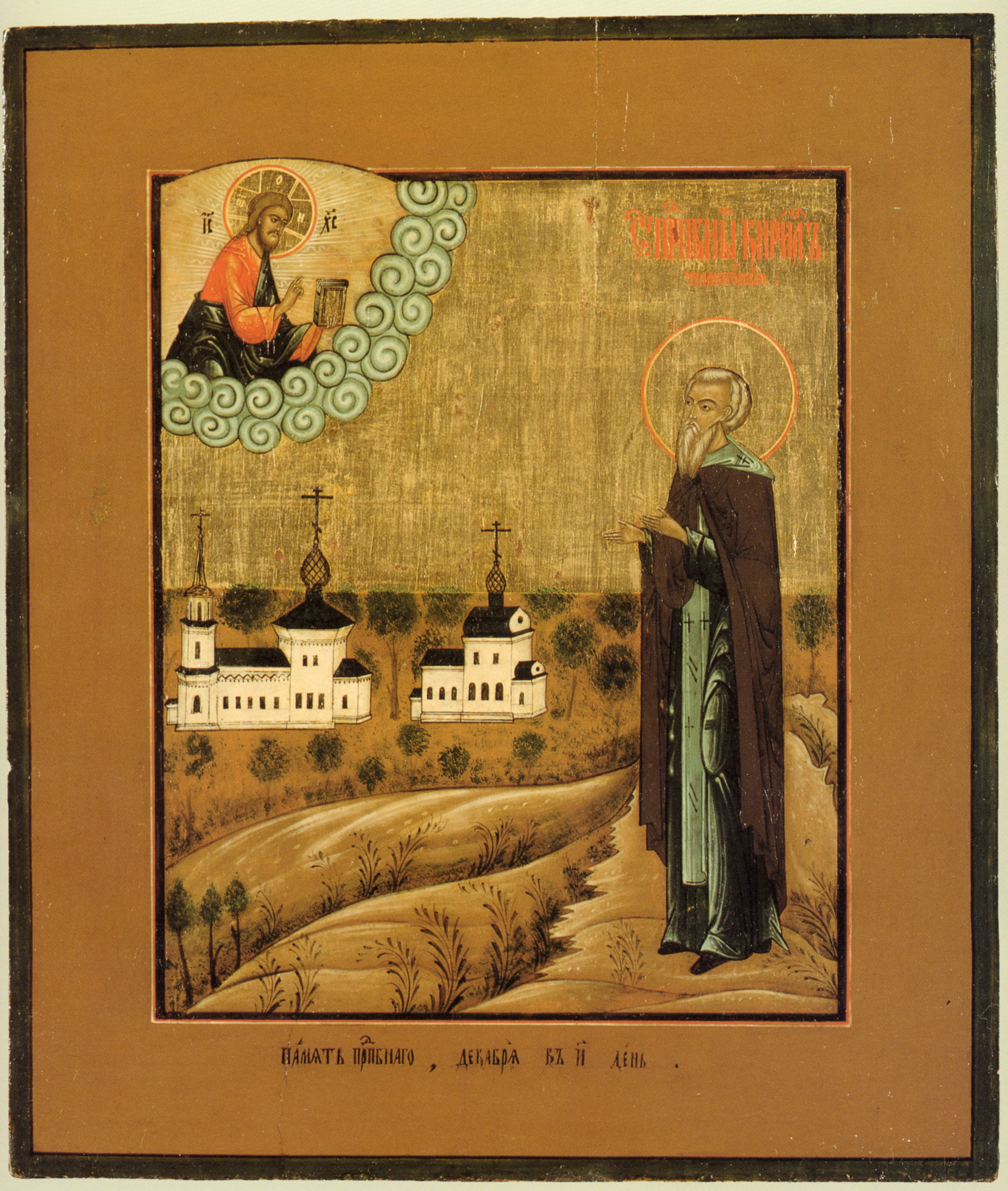
St. Cyril, Founder and Abbot of Chelmogorsk Monastery, Karelia.

== Sources ==
- December 8/21. Orthodox Calendar (PRAVOSLAVIE.RU).
- December 21 / December 8. HOLY TRINITY RUSSIAN ORTHODOX CHURCH (A parish of the Patriarchate of Moscow).
- December 8. OCA - The Lives of the Saints.
- December 8. Latin Saints of the Orthodox Patriarchate of Rome.
- The Roman Martyrology. Transl. by the Archbishop of Baltimore. Last Edition, According to the Copy Printed at Rome in 1914. Revised Edition, with the Imprimatur of His Eminence Cardinal Gibbons. Baltimore: John Murphy Company, 1916. pp. 377–378.

Greek Sources

- Great Synaxaristes: (in Greek) 8 ΔΕΚΕΜΒΡΙΟΥ. ΜΕΓΑΣ ΣΥΝΑΞΑΡΙΣΤΗΣ.
- (in Greek) Συναξαριστής. 8 Δεκεμβρίου. ECCLESIA.GR. (H ΕΚΚΛΗΣΙΑ ΤΗΣ ΕΛΛΑΔΟΣ).

Russian Sources

- (in Russian) 21 декабря (8 декабря). Православная Энциклопедия под редакцией Патриарха Московского и всея Руси Кирилла (электронная версия). (Orthodox Encyclopedia - Pravenc.ru).
- (in Russian) 8 декабря (ст.ст.) 21 декабря 2014 (нов. ст.). Русская Православная Церковь Отдел внешних церковных связей. (DECR).
