= Tychicus =

Companion of the Apostle Paul

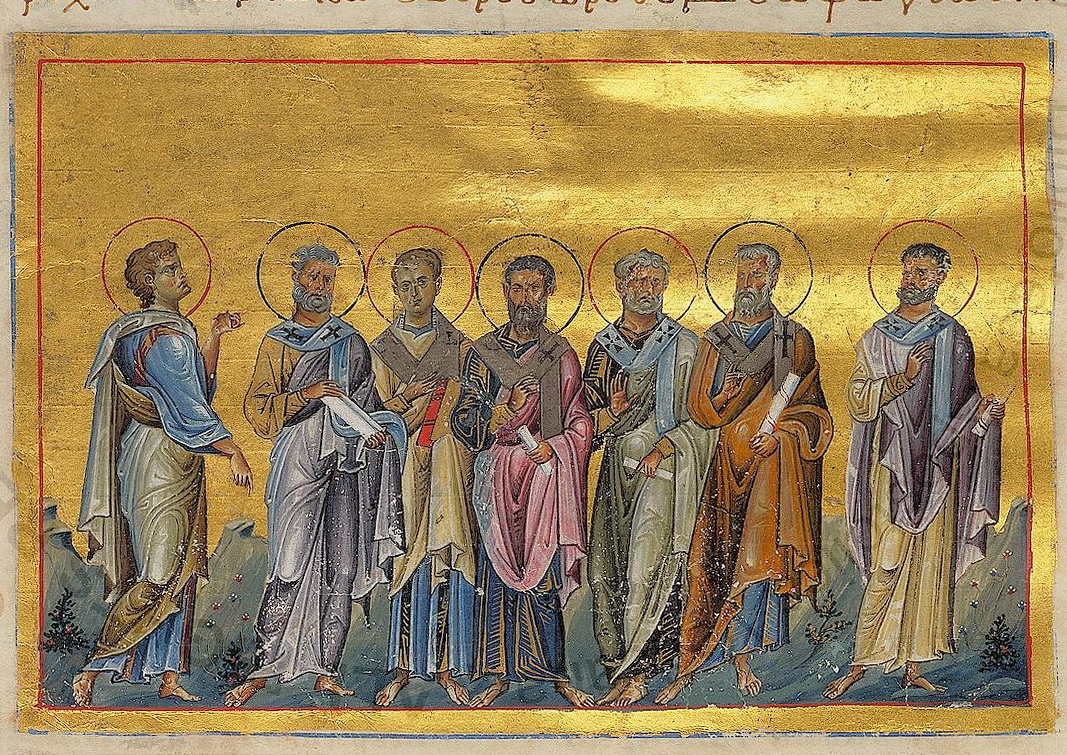
Sosthenes, Apollo, Cephas, Tychicus, Epaphroditus, Cæsar and Onesiphorus

Tychicus (/ˈtɪkɪkəs/: Greek: Τυχικός, also Tychicos) was an Asiatic Christian who, with Trophimus, accompanied the Apostle Paul on a part of his journey from Macedonia to Jerusalem. He is also was with Paul during his imprisonments, either in Caesarea or in Rome, whence the apostle sent him to Ephesus, probably for the purpose of building up and encouraging the church there. In the New Testament, he is mentioned five times (Acts 20:4; Ephesians 6:21–22; Colossians 4:7; 2 Timothy 4:12; Titus 3:12).

== Appearance in the Bible ==
(1) Acts 20:4 states that Tychicus was from the Roman province of Asia. The Western text indicates that he was an Ephesian.

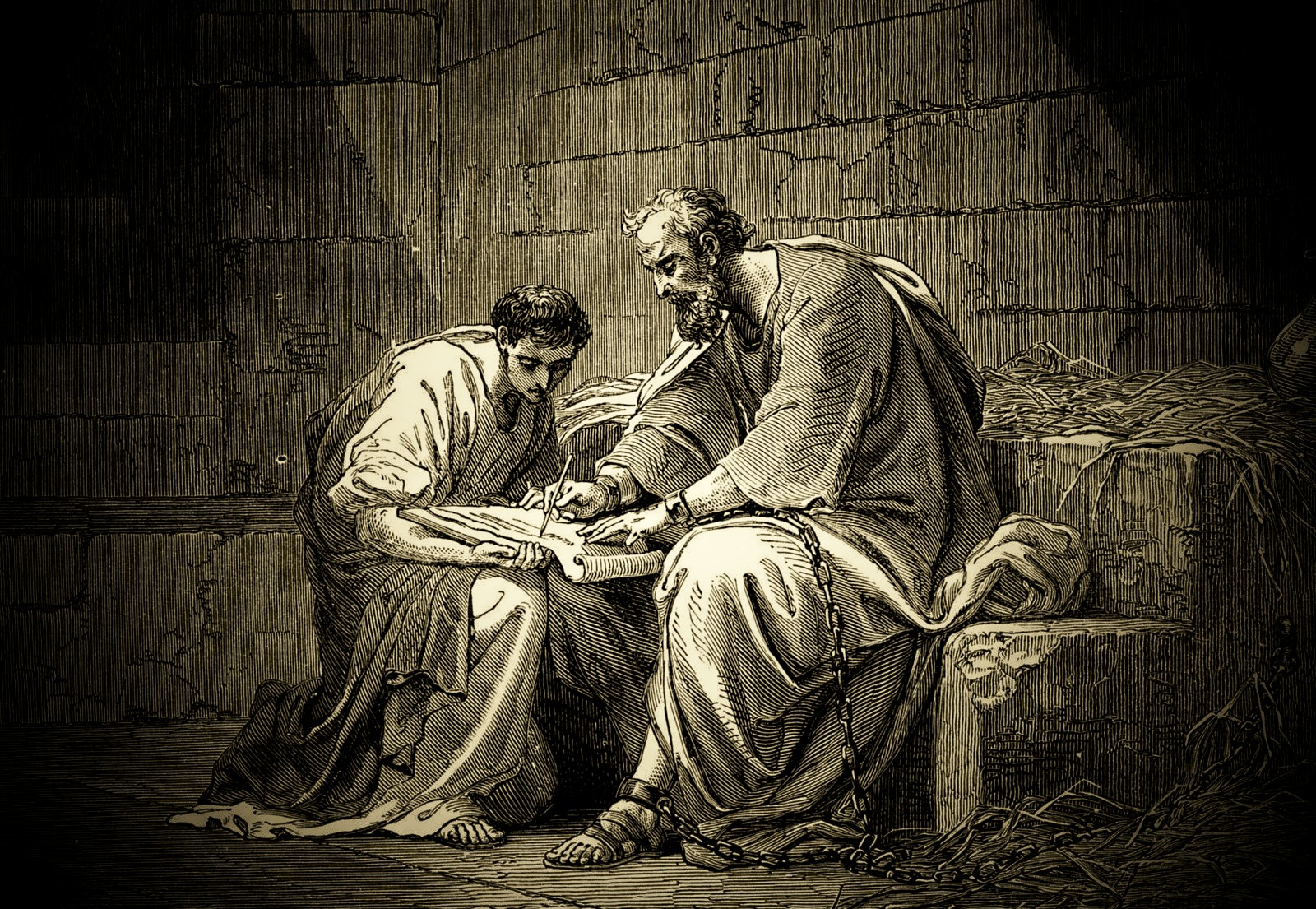
Paul ends the letter to the Ephesians, and hands it over to Tychicus. Wood engraving by Gustave Doré

(2) In Ephesians 6:21, the author (traditionally identified as Paul) calls Tychicus a "dear brother and faithful servant in the Lord" (NIV),

(3) while in Colossians 4:7 he says he is "a dear brother, a faithful minister and fellow servant in the Lord."

In both Ephesians and Colossians, the author indicates that he is sending Tychicus to the Christians to whom he is writing, in order to encourage them.

(4) The passages in the Epistle to Titus (Titus 3:12) and to Timothy show that Tychicus was again with Paul after the appeal to the emperor had resulted in the apostle regaining his freedom. The passage in Titus evidently refers to the interval between Paul's first and second Roman imprisonments, and while he was again engaged in missionary journeys. The apostle writes to Titus, who was in Crete in charge of the churches there, that he intended to send either Artemas or Tychicus to him, so as to take the oversight of the work of the gospel in that island so that Titus might be free to come to be with the apostle at Nicopolis.

(5) The last passage where Tychicus is mentioned occurs in 2 Timothy, which was written in Rome not long before Paul's execution. To the very end Paul was busy as ever in the work of the gospel; and though it would have been a comfort to him to have his friends beside him, yet the interests of the kingdom of Christ are uppermost in his thoughts, and he sends these friends to help the progress of the work. To the last, Tychicus was serviceable as ever: "Tychicus I sent to Ephesus" (2 Timothy 4:12). As Timothy was in charge of the church in Ephesus (1 Timothy 1:3), the coming of Tychicus would set him free, so as to enable him to set off at once to rejoin Paul at Rome, as the apostle desired him (2 Timothy 4:9, 2 Timothy 4:21).

== Later traditions ==
The Catholic Encyclopedia notes that different traditions make Tychicus out to be the Bishop of Colophon, Chalcedon or Neapolis in Cyprus.

A pseudepigraphal list of the seventy disciples traditionally ascribed to Hippolytus of Rome includes both "Tychicus, bishop of Chalcedon" and "Tychicus, bishop of Colophonia" separately. The Catholic Encyclopedia describes this list as "worthless"; in Eastern Orthodoxy, the duplication is regarded as erroneous and referring to one and the same person, whose feast is on December 8 along with fellow disciples Sosthenes, Apollos, Cephas, Epaphroditus, Caesar, and Onesiphorus.

The latest official edition of the Roman Martyrology of the Catholic Church commemorates Tychicus as a Saint under the date of 29 April, quoting Paul's affectionate description of him in Colossians 4:7.
