= December 7 (Eastern Orthodox liturgics) =

Day in the Eastern Orthodox liturgical calendar

Eastern Orthodox liturgical calendar
December 6	December 7	December 8
December 7 O.S. ≍ December 20 N.S. December 7 N.S ≍ November 24 O.S.

An Eastern Orthodox cross

December 7 in Eastern Orthodox liturgical calendars is a feast day and a day of commemoration of saints and martyrs. Although some Orthodox churches use the Revised Julian Calendar and others use the traditional Julian calendar, the fixed commemorations for their respective December 7 are broadly the same, no matter which calendar is used. (Note: Despite the dates being the same, the days to which they refer typically differ by 13 days. The notation Old Style or O.S. is sometimes used to indicate a date in the traditional Julian Calendar (the "Old Calendar"). The notation New Style or N.S. indicates a date in the Revised Julian calendar (the "New Calendar").)

== Saints ==
- Holy Apostle Tychicus (1st century) (see also: December 8)
- Martyr Athenodorus of Mesopotamia (304) (Note: The Holy Martyr Athenodoros, from Syrian Mesopotamia, led a monastic life from the time of his youthful years. Reported on, he was arrested and condemned to fierce tortures by the governor of the land, Eleusios. Miracles accompanied the martyrdom of the saint, which brought many of the pagans there present to the Christian faith. When they decided to behead the saint with a sword, the executioner died, and his head separated from its shoulders. The saint gave up his spirit to God in prayer.)
- Martyr Neophytus, by drowning
- Martyr Dometius, by the sword
- Martyrs Priscus, Martin, and Nicholas, near Blachernae
- Martyrs Isidore, Acepsimas, and Leo, by fire
- Martyrs Gaius and Gainus, by fire
- Venerable Ammon (Amun, Ammoun), Bishop of Nitria (c. 350) (Note: In some Menaia he is given as the Bishop of Nitria.) (see also October 4)
- Saint Ambrose of Milan, Bishop (Ambrose of Mediolanum) (397) (Note: Born in France, his father was prefect there. Before he was thirty-five, he was appointed governor of Liguria and Aemilia with his headquarters in Milan. The whole province was rent by the Arian controversy. When the Bishop of Milan died in 374, Ambrose, as governor, went to the Cathedral to ensure peace and order the new election. He himself, though still a catechumen, was elected by acclamation, after a child had been suddenly heard to cry out 'Ambrose for bishop'. Ambrose's objections were overruled and he was consecrated on Dec 7 374. He proved to be a Church Father. He excelled as an administrator, writer, protector of the poor and the 'hammer of Arianism'. He was outspoken in withstanding the tyranny of Emperors. His courage in reproving Theodosius the Great was a fine example of Orthodoxy. He reposed on Great Friday, April 4 397.) (Note: "AT Milan, the consecration of St. Ambrose, bishop and doctor of the Church, who has ennobled the universal Church by his holiness and teaching.")
- Holy Orthodox Martyrs burned in the Temple, in Carthage, by the Arians
- Holy 362 martyrs of Africa, martyred by the Arians:
  - Holy 300 martyrs of Africa martyred by the Arians, by beheading, under Huneric (c. 477–484)
  - Holy 60 Hieromartyrs, Priests, by having their tongues cut out (c. 474–476)
  - Holy 2 Hieromartyrs, Priests, under Huneric, by sawing (c. 474–476)
- Saint Bassa of Jerusalem, Abbess (5th century) (see also: December 9 - Greek)
- Saint Ignatius, Monk, near Blachernae
- Saint Paul the Obedient of Cyprus (Note: The Monk Paul the Obedient – when he lived is unknown. There is only a short life which says that he was the son of well-off parents. He left secular life upon reaching maturity. The appellation "Obedient" was bestowed upon the monk for the deep humility peculiar to him and for the complete renunciation of his own will. One time the monk moved by hand boiling resin-pitch, and received not the slightest burn from it. Some of the brethren regarded him as a God-bearing ascetic, but others became suspicious of him. Through prayers the monks received a unique vision proving that their brother – was a true ascetic. By night they were all transported off to paradise and they conversed with the Monk Paul, who permitted them to take with them for the memory a flower or twig. Awakening from sleep, they detected in their hands the flowers and twigs from paradise. After this Blessed Paul set off to Jerusalem, and then to Cyprus. Having led a solitary life, he expired to God on Mount Paregoros [Mount Solace]. Before his death the voice of God said to him: "Ascend the mountain, Paul, and accept the end of life".)
- Venerable John of St. Sabbas Monastery
- Saint Ambrose of Cyprus

== Pre-Schism Western saints ==
- Female Martyr of Old Rome, by being burned alive, for refusing Arianism.
- Saint Urban of Teano (Urbanus), Bishop of Teano in Campania, Confessor (c. 356)
- Saint Victor of Piacenza, first Bishop of Piacenza c. 322–375, defender of Orthodoxy against Arianism (375)
- Saint Anianus (Agnan, Aignan), fifth Bishop of Chartres in France (5th century)
- Saint Martin of Saujon, a disciple of Saint Martin of Tours, founded the monastery of Saujon (c. 400) (Note: "At Saintes, in France, St. Martin, abbot, at whose tomb God works frequent miracles.")
- Saint Servus, a layman of noble birth, martyred under the Arian Vandal King Huneric (483) (Note: "At Tuburbum, in Africa, during the persecution of the Vandals, under the Arian king Hunneric, St. Servus, martyr, who, being for a very long time beaten with rods, lifted up on high with pulleys and suddenly dropped on flint-stones with his whole weight, and rubbed over with sharp stones, obtained the palm of martyrdom.") (see also: December 6)
- Saint Buithe (Buite, Boethius), founder of Monasterboice in Ireland (521) (Note: After some years in Italy and elsewhere, he returned to Scotland and helped enlighten the Picts. Carbuddo is named after him.)
- Saint Burgundofara (Fara), founder of Faremoutiers Abbey (657) (Note: Blessed by St. Columbanus as a child, she became a nun despite her father's opposition, and so began the convent of Brige in France. This was later called Faremoutiers, i.e. Fara's Monastery, where she was abbess for thirty-seven years.)
- Saint Diuma, Bishop of the Mercians and Middle Anglians (7th century) (Note: Born in Ireland, he helped convert Mercia in England as a missionary and bishop.)

== Post-Schism Orthodox saints ==
- Saint Philothea of Turnovo (Philothea of Thrace, the Protectress of Romania) (1060) (Note: Her relics are in Arges, Romania.)
- Saint John the Faster of the Kiev Caves (12th century)
- Righteous Gerasimos, Ascetic of Euboea (Euripos), missionary of Greece in the period of the Frankokratia (c. 1320)
- Venerable Gregory the Silent of Serbia, founder of Grigoriou Monastery, Mt. Athos (1405) (Note: The Monk Gregory, born in Serbia, pursued asceticism on Athos. The monastery formed by him, and dedicated by him to Saint Nicholas, was termed in his honour the Gregoryite. In the Athos record-acts was discovered the signature of the monk from about 1405. By tradition, the relics of Saint Gregory were taken from Athos by Serbian monks.)
- Venerable Nilus, Monk of Stolobny (Stolben) Island (Stolbensk Lake) (1544)
- Saint Anthony, Abbot of Siya Monastery (Novgorod) (1556)
- Righteous Gerasimos Mikragiannanitis, Hymnographer of the Great Church of Christ (1991) (Note: St. Gerasimos the Hymnographer was formally numbered among the Saints by the Holy and Sacred Synod of the Ecumenical Patriarchate of Constantinople on January 10, 2023 (N.S.).)

=== New martyrs and confessors ===
- New Hieromartyr Sergius Galkovsky, Hieromonk (1917)
- New Hieromartyr Andronicus Barsukov, Hierodeacon of the Nosov Holy Transfiguration Monastery, Tambov (1918)
- New Hieromartyr Antonius Popov, Priest (1918)
- New Hieroconfessor Ambrose Polyansky, Bishop of Kamenets-Podolsk (1932) (Note: See also: (in Russian) Амвросий (Полянский). Википедии. (Russian Wikipedia).)
- New Hieromartyrs Gurias Samoylov, Hieromonk of Optina Monastery, and Galacteon Ubranovich-Novikov, Hieromonk of Valaam Monastery (1937)
- New Hieromartyrs Sergius Goloshapov, (Note: See: (in Russian) Голощапов, Сергей Иванович. Википедии. (Russian Wikipedia).) Michael Uspensky and Sergius Uspensky, Priests (1937)
- New Hieromartyr Nikiphor Litvin, Deacon (1937)
- New Martyr Joanna Demidova (1937)
- New Hieromartyrs Peter Krestov (Note: See: (in Russian) Крестов, Пётр Иванович. Википедии. (Russian Wikipedia).) and Basil Mirozhin, Priests (1941)

== Other commemorations ==
- Consecration of the Church of the Theotokos in the Kouratoros (Curator) district of Constantinople ((in Greek) τοῦ Κουράτορος) (5th century) (Note: This is mentioned in Patmos Codex 266.) (Note: A small Byzantine building, now used for Moslem worship under the name of Balaban Aga Mesjedi, is situated in the quarter of Shahzadé, in Istanbul; off the south side of the street leading to the mosque of Sultan Mehemed and the gate Edirne Kapoussi. A.J. Mordtmann proposes to identify it with the church of the Theotokos in the district of the Curator (τοῦ Κουράτορος), the foundation of which is ascribed to Verina, the consort of Leo Macellus (457-474).)
- Vladimir Icon of the Mother of God of Seliger (Note: The Icon of the Mother of God of Seligersk-Vladimir was brought in the 16th century by the Monk Nil of Stolobensk (commemorated 7 December and 27 May) to the island of Seliger, where the saint pursued asceticism and founded a monastic hermitage. The celebration for the Wonderworking Icon of the Mother of God is also on 7 December.)
- Repose of Abbot Gabriel of Valaam (1910) (Note: Abbot Gabriel (1848-1910). When he was 18 years old [his future Abbot of Valaam came to Abbot Damascene, who sternly said that "if one comes to a monastery and says he wants to be a monk, that means serious business—there should be no change until death!" And the youth made a vow right then, which he kept for the rest of his life. At a relatively young age he lived in the severest Skete of St. John the Baptist, with the great ascetic and hermit, John the Blind. This experience later enabled him to promote anchoretism. Eventually he became abbot of Valaam. After 37 years there, he was transferred to the beautiful Alatyr Monastery along the Volga River, that was in need of restoration. Having done much for its betterment, he died a sudden but peaceful death seven years after he left Valaam.)
- Repose of Elder Ephraim Moraitis of Philotheou and Arizona (2019) (Note: He reposed on Saturday December 7, 2019 at about 9:00pm or 10:00pm (MST) at St. Anthony's Monastery in Florence, which he founded in 1995. Archbishop Elpidophoros of America co-officiated at the funeral service for Elder Ephraim on December 11, along with Metropolitans Alexios of Atlanta, Gerasimos of San Francisco and Isaiah of Denver. The Abbot of the Monastery of Philotheou, Elder Nikodimos, and several other Athonite fathers were also in attendance.) (see also: November 24 - O.S.)

== Icon gallery ==
Martyr Athenodorus of Mesopotamia.
(Menologion of Basil II, 10th century).

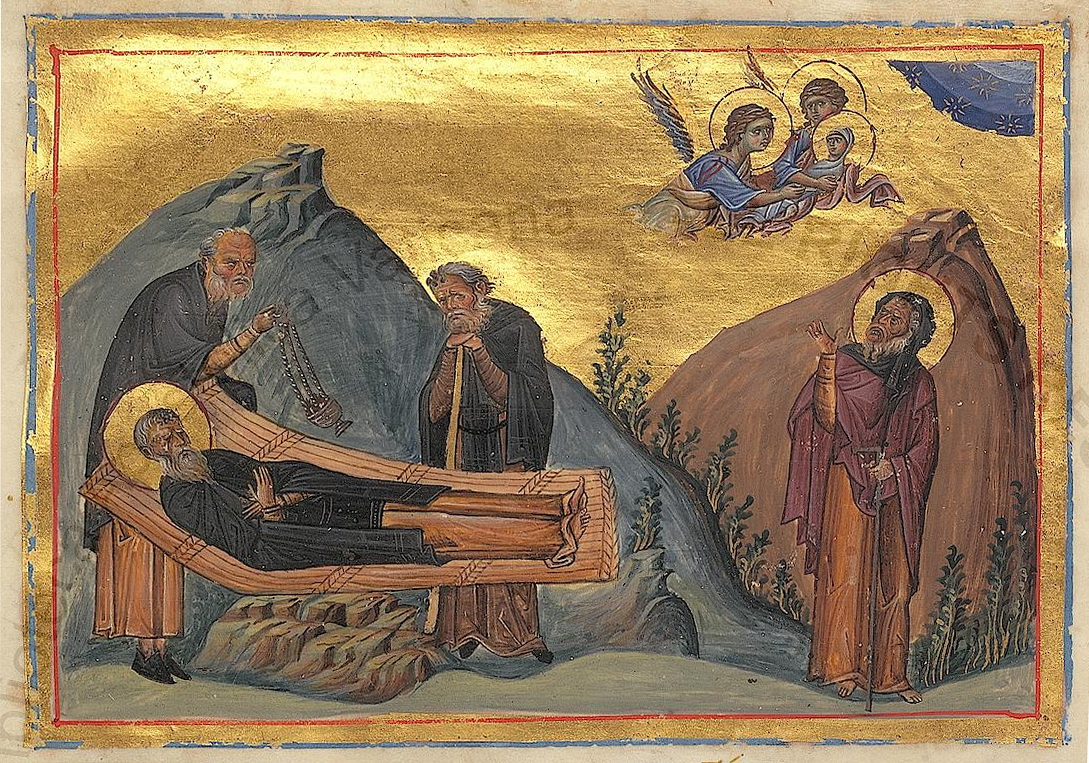
St. Ammon of Egypt.
(Menologion of Basil II, 10th century).

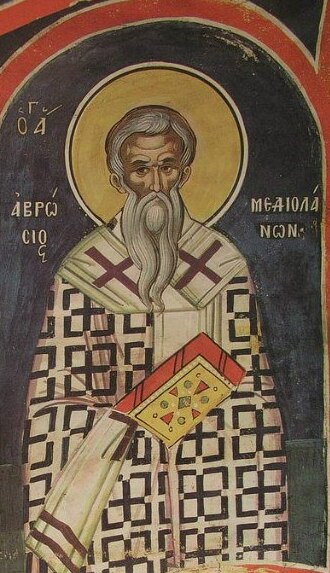
St. Ambrose of Milan.

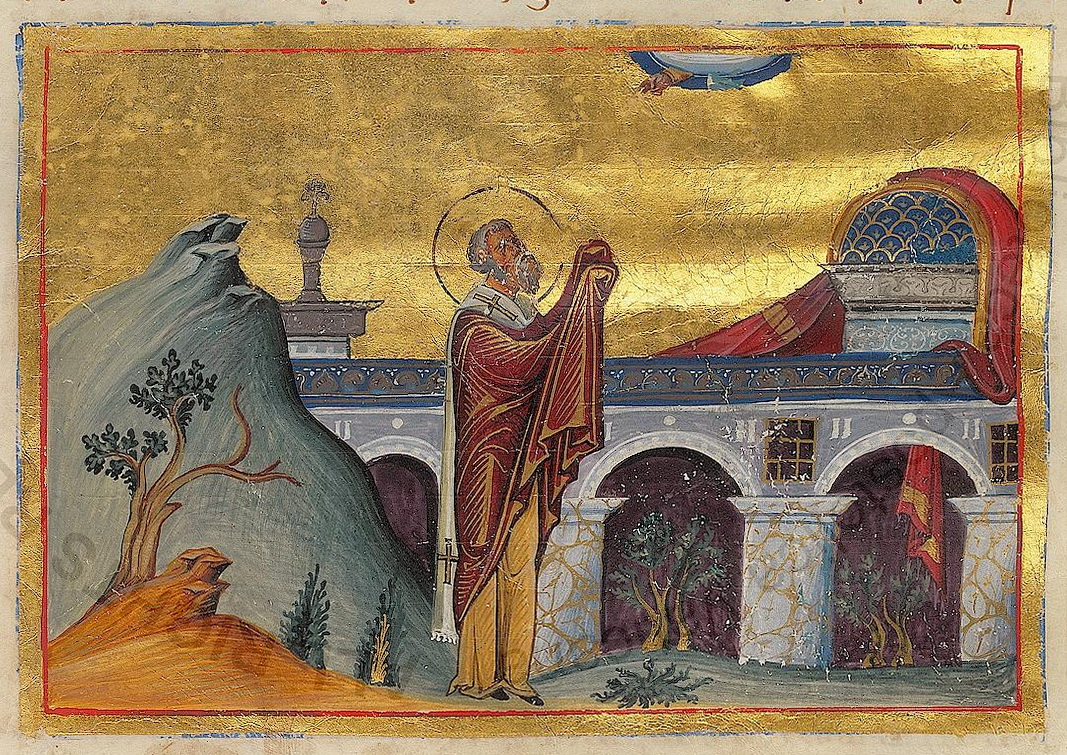
St. Ambrose of Milan.
(Menologion of Basil II, 10th century).

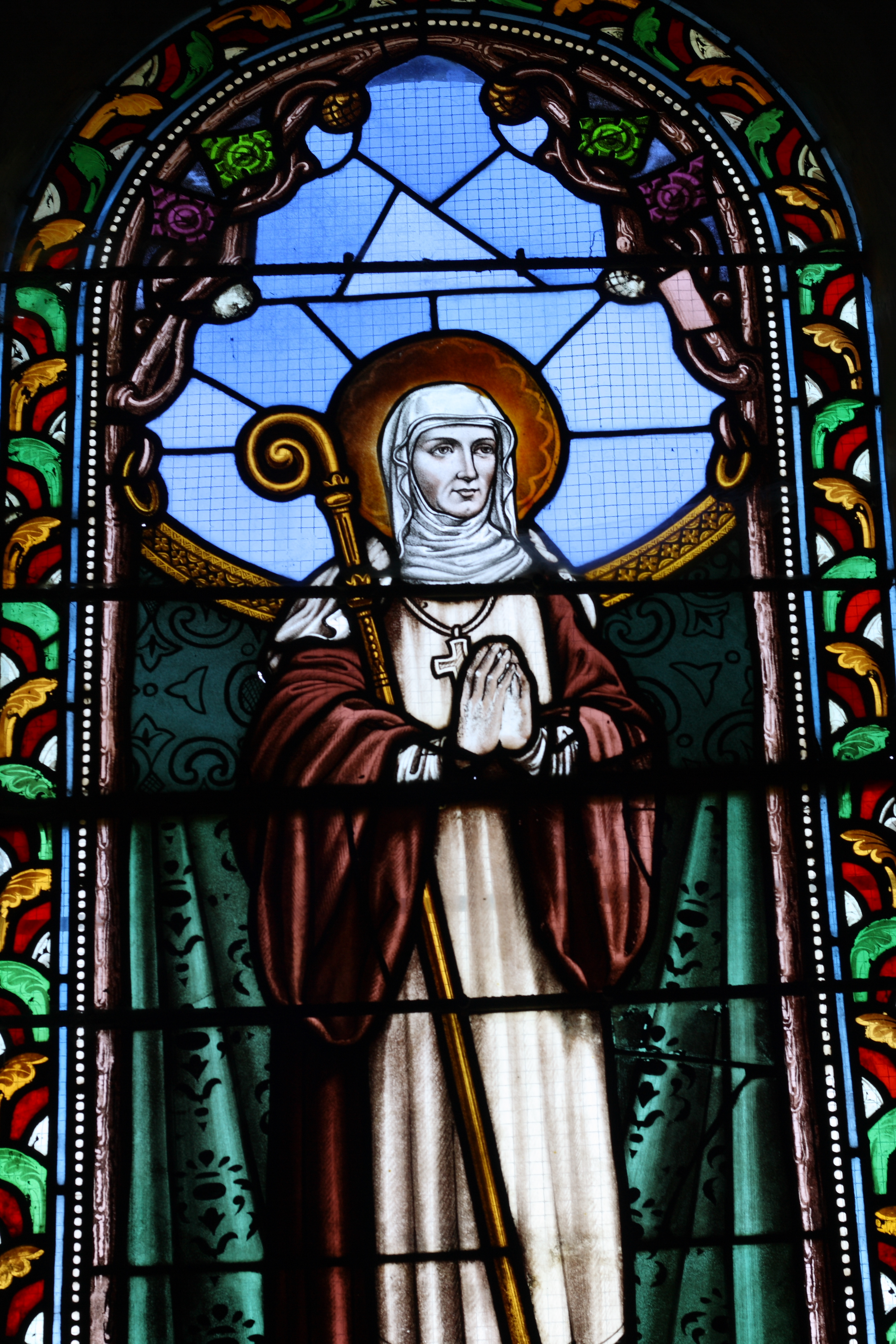
St. Burgundofara, stained glass window.

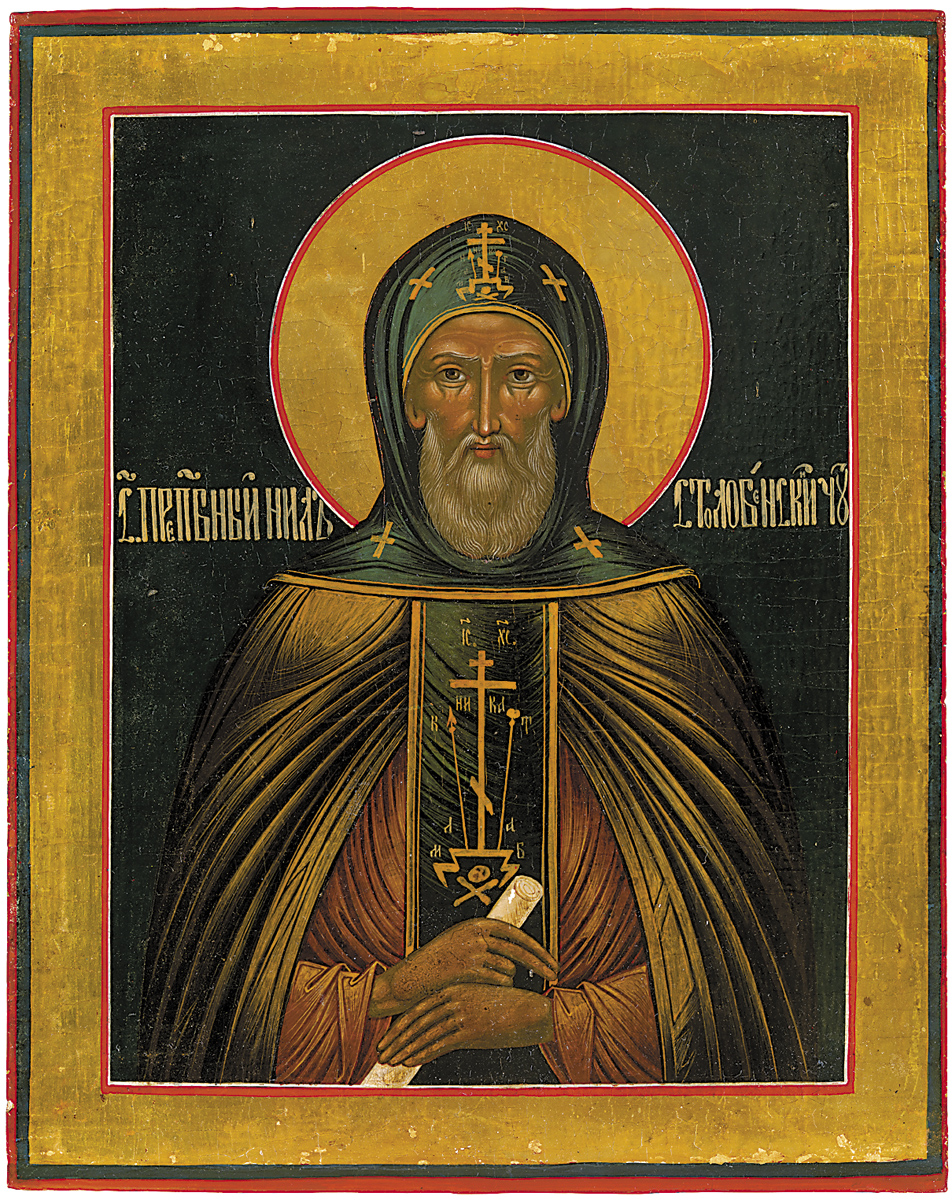
Venerable Nilus, Monk of Stolobny.

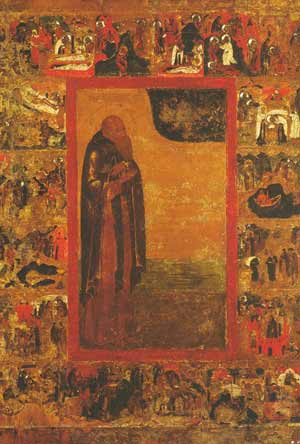
St. Anthony of Siya.

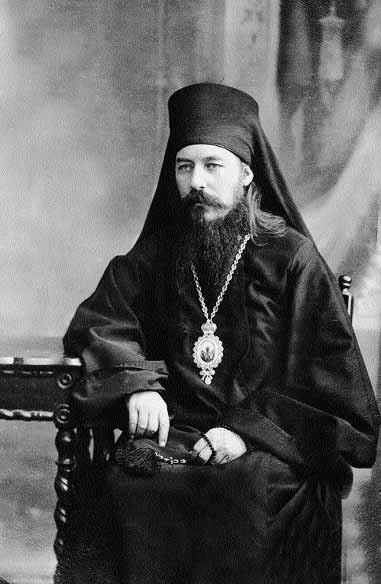
Hiero-confessor Ambrose (Polyansky), Bishop of Kamenets-Podolsk.

New Hieromartyr Sergius Goloshapov, Archpriest.

== Sources ==
- December 7/20. Orthodox Calendar (PRAVOSLAVIE.RU).
- December 20 / December 7. HOLY TRINITY RUSSIAN ORTHODOX CHURCH (A parish of the Patriarchate of Moscow).
- December 7. OCA - The Lives of the Saints.
- December 7. Latin Saints of the Orthodox Patriarchate of Rome.
- The Roman Martyrology. Transl. by the Archbishop of Baltimore. Last Edition, According to the Copy Printed at Rome in 1914. Revised Edition, with the Imprimatur of His Eminence Cardinal Gibbons. Baltimore: John Murphy Company, 1916. pp. 376–377.
- Rev. Richard Stanton. A Menology of England and Wales, or, Brief Memorials of the Ancient British and English Saints Arranged According to the Calendar, Together with the Martyrs of the 16th and 17th Centuries. London: Burns & Oates, 1892. pp. 587-588.

Greek Sources

- Great Synaxaristes: (in Greek) 7 ΔΕΚΕΜΒΡΙΟΥ. ΜΕΓΑΣ ΣΥΝΑΞΑΡΙΣΤΗΣ.
- (in Greek) Συναξαριστής. 7 Δεκεμβρίου. ECCLESIA.GR. (H ΕΚΚΛΗΣΙΑ ΤΗΣ ΕΛΛΑΔΟΣ).

Russian Sources

- (in Russian) 20 декабря (7 декабря). Православная Энциклопедия под редакцией Патриарха Московского и всея Руси Кирилла (электронная версия). (Orthodox Encyclopedia - Pravenc.ru).
- (in Russian) 7 декабря (ст.ст.) 20 декабря 2014 (нов. ст.). Русская Православная Церковь Отдел внешних церковных связей. (DECR).
