= Metropolis of Corinth =

Metropolitan see of the Church of Greece in Corinthia, Greece

The Metropolis of Corinth, Sicyon, Zemenon, Tarsos and Polyphengos (Greek: Ιερά Μητρόπολις Κορίνθου, Σικυώνος, Ζεμενού, Ταρσού και Πολυφέγγους) is a metropolitan see of the Church of Greece in Corinthia, Greece. Since the Middle Ages it has also existed as a Latin Catholic titular see. The latest metropolitan (since 2025) is Paul II Kitsos.

== History ==
The foundation of the See of Corinth is attributed to the Apostle Paul, who is held to have preached in the city and addressed multiple epistles to the Corinthian Church, two of which became canon. His successor and first bishop was Saint Apollos of Ephesus. Pope Clement I also wrote an epistle to the community, in the first century. In the Roman and early Byzantine periods, Corinth was the capital and metropolitan see of the province of Achaea (southern Greece).

The city was largely destroyed in the earthquakes of 365 and 375, followed by Alaric's invasion in 396. It was rebuilt on a smaller scale thereafter, but with grandiose buildings. Corinth declined from the 6th century on, and the main settlement moved from the lower city to the Acrocorinth. Despite its becoming the capital of the themes of Hellas and Peloponnese, it was not until the 9th century that the city began to recover, reaching its apogee in the 11th and 12th centuries, when it was the site of a flourishing silk industry. This prosperity ended with the Norman sack of 1147.

Besides St. Apollos, Le Quien (II, 155) mentions forty-three bishops for the Roman/Byzantine era: among them, St. Sosthenes, the disciple of St. Paul, St. Dionysius; Paul, brother of St. Peter, Bishop of Argos in the tenth century; St. Athanasius, in the same century; George, or Gregory, a commentator of liturgical hymns. Until the 9th century, Corinth remained the metropolis of southern Greece, and particularly the Peloponnese. Indeed, the bishop of Corinth was the only bishop from the Peloponnese to attend the Council of Ephesus in 431, and the only bishop from Greece to attend the Third Council of Constantinople in 680. From the early 9th century, however, the primacy of Corinth over the Peloponnese was challenged by the See of Patras, and from the 10th century on Corinth was restricted to the eastern Peloponnese and certain of the Ionian Islands. Based on the various Notitiae Episcopatuum from the 10th–12th centuries, Corinth counted seven suffragan sees: Cephalonia, Zakynthos, Damala, Lacedaemon/Monemvasia, Argos, Helos and Zemena.

In 1203/4, the city fell to the ambitious lord of the Argolid, Leo Sgouros, who secured possession of Corinth by inviting its Metropolitan, Nicholas, to Acronauplia for dinner, and then had him thrown from its heights. Sgouros' ambitions to create a state of his own in southern Greece were checked by the onslaught of the victorious Crusaders, who captured Corinth in 1210.

After the city's capture, the Crusaders established a Latin Archbishopric to replace the Greek Orthodox see. Le Quien (III, 883) mentions twenty Latin prelates from 1210 to 1700, but Eubel (I, 218; II, 152) mentions twenty-two archbishops for the period from 1212 to 1476. Although Corinth was the oldest and most prestigious see in southern Greece, during the period of Frankish rule it was eclipsed by the Latin Archbishopric of Patras.

The city was recovered by the Byzantine Despotate of the Morea in 1395, and, after a short period (1397–1404) of rule by the Knights Hospitaller, returned to Byzantine hands, where it remained until it fell to the Ottoman Empire on 8 August 1458. After the Byzantine recovery of the city, the Catholic see became a titular see. Today, the Metropolis of Corinth belongs to the Church of Greece, under the Archbishop of Athens and All Greece.

== List of bishops ==
Name	Name in Greek	Tenure	Notes
Apollos		mid-1st century	
Silas			
Onesiphorus			
Sosthenes			
Apollonius		early 2nd century	
Dionysius I		ca. 170	
Bacchylus		ca. 196	
Hesiodus		3rd century	
Dionysius II		ca. 350	
Dorotheus		late 4th century	
Eustathius		381	
Alexander		406	
Perigenes		ca. 431	
Erasistratus		446	
Peter		ca. 451	
Photius		ca. 536	
Theodore		6th century	
Anastasius		ca. 590–591	
John I		591	
Stephen I		681	
Gabriel I		8th/9th century	
John II		879–880	
Paul			
Basil			
Athanasius			
Gabriel			
George			
Nicetas			
Michael			
Nicholas			
Stephen II			
Theodore			
Gregory			
Sergius			
Nicodemus I			
Hyacinthus			
Theoleptos			
Isidore			
Theognostos			
Latin Archbishops, 1212–mid-15th century
Mark		1445	
Malachias		1446	
Joachim		ca. 1447	
Cyril I		1492–1507	
Macarius I		1507–1517	
Theophanes		1517–1534	
Joasaph I		1541–1549	
Sophronius		1549–1569	
Laurentius		1574–1585	
Neophytus I		1585–1589	
Laurentius		1590	
Neophytus I		1595	
Anthimus		1620–1622	
Neophytus II		1622–1626	
Daniel		1626–1628	
Cyril I Spanos		1628–1635	Subsequently Ecumenical Patriarch of Constantinople, 1652 and 1654
Ezekiel II		1636–1638	
Joasaph II		1638–1641	
Gregory I		1641–1660	
Parthenius		1660–1668	
Callistus		1668–1672	
Zachary I		1678–1684	
Gregory II Notaras		1684–1715	under Venetian rule
Joasaph III		1715–1719	
Metrophanes		1719	
Parthenios		1734–1763	
Makarios Notaras		1764–1767	
Gabriel III		1776–1784	
Zachary II		1784–1819	
Cyril II		1819–1836	
Cyril III		1841–1842	
Gerasimos		1842–1843	
Jonah		1852–1854	
Amfilochios		1854–1875	
Bartholomew		1899–1918	
Damaskinos Papandreou		1922–1938	Subsequently Archbishop of Athens, 1941–1949
Michail Konstantinidis		1939–1949	
Prokopios		1949–1965	
Paneteleimon Karanikolas		1965–2006	
Dionysios Mantalos		2006–2025	
Paul II Kitsos		2025 –present	

== Sources ==
- Bon, Antoine (1969). La Morée franque. Recherches historiques, topographiques et archéologiques sur la principauté d'Achaïe [The Frankish Morea. Historical, Topographic and Archaeological Studies on the Principality of Achaea] (in French). Paris: De Boccard.
- Gregory, Timothy E. (1991). "Corinth". In Kazhdan, Alexander (ed.). The Oxford Dictionary of Byzantium. Oxford and New York: Oxford University Press. pp. 531–533. ISBN 0-19-504652-8.
- Setton, Kenneth M. (1976). The Papacy and the Levant (1204–1571), Volume I: The Thirteenth and Fourteenth Centuries. Vol. 1. Philadelphia: The American Philosophical Society. ISBN 0-87169-114-0.
- Konrad Eubel, Hierarchia Catholica Medii Aevi, vol. 1, p. 210; vol. 2, p. 136; vol. 3, p. 178; vol. 4, pp. 164-165; vol. 5, p. 173; vol. 6, p. 183
- Le Quien, Michel (1740). "Ecclesia Corinthi". Oriens Christianus, in quatuor Patriarchatus digestus: quo exhibentur ecclesiæ, patriarchæ, cæterique præsules totius Orientis. Tomus secundus, in quo Illyricum Orientale ad Patriarchatum Constantinopolitanum pertinens, Patriarchatus Alexandrinus & Antiochenus, magnæque Chaldæorum & Jacobitarum Diœceses exponuntur (in Latin). Paris: Ex Typographia Regia. cols. 155–168. OCLC 955922747.
- "Corinthe", in Dictionnaire d'Histoire et de Géographie ecclésiastiques, vol. XIII, Paris 1956, pp. 876-880
