= Mantalos =

Mantalos (Greek: Μάνταλος) is a Greek surname. Notable people with the surname include:

- Dionysios Mantalos (1952–2025), Greek Orthodox bishop
- Petros Mantalos (born 1991), Greek footballer
