= Metropolis of Philippi, Neapolis and Thasos =

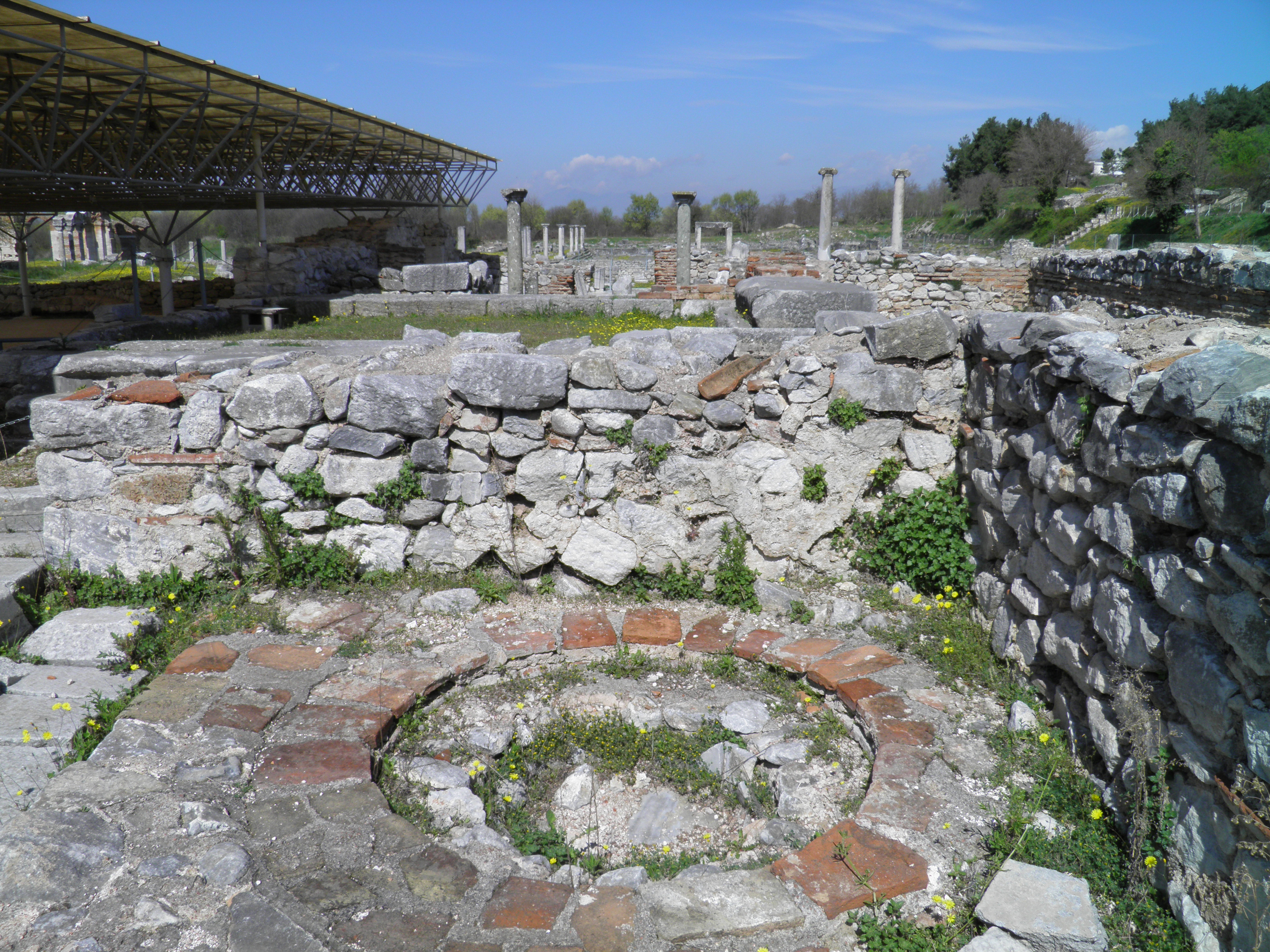
The Octagonal Basilica, Philippi

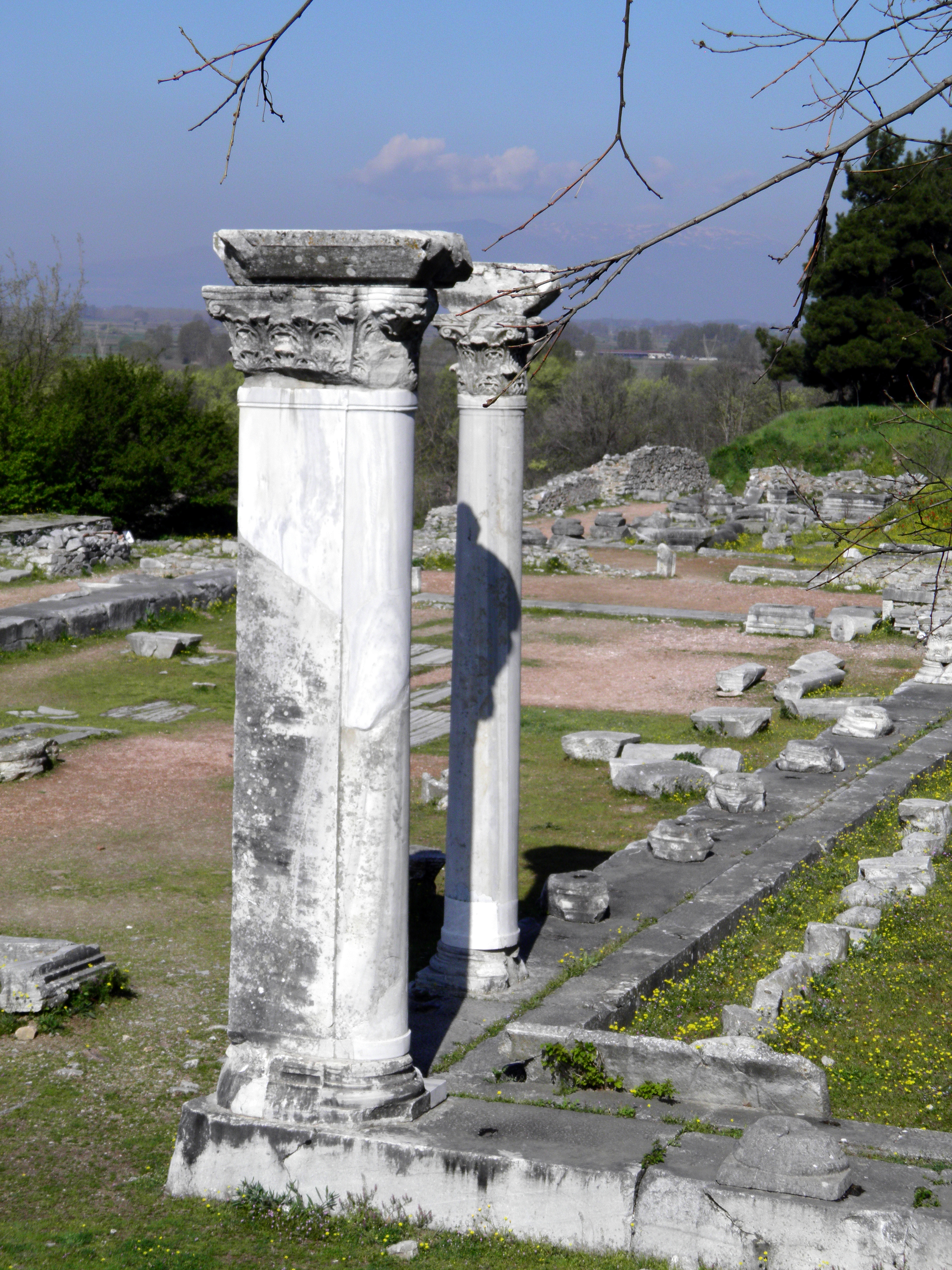
Ruins of a large three-aisled early Christian basilica (Basilica A), end of 5th century AD, Philippi

The Metropolis of Philippi, Neapolis and Thasos (Greek: Ιερά Μητρόπολις Φιλίππων, Νεαπόλεως και Θάσου) is a Greek Orthodox metropolitan see in eastern Macedonia, Greece. It was founded in the ancient city of Philippi, where it was based until the destruction of the host city in the 14th or 15th century. Today it is based in the city of Kavala. Although being subject to the Ecumenical Patriarchate of Constantinople, it is administered by the Church of Greece.

== History ==
Philippi was an early site of Christianity, with a bishopric established at an unknown later time. The church was mentioned several times in the New Testament and in the Byzantine Notitiae Episcopatuum. Several basilicas were built here under the Byzantines.

== Bishops ==
The identity of the first bishop of Philippi is a matter of controversy. The church in Philippi was established through the work of Saint Paul, who later in the Epistle to the Philippians refers to unnamed bishops (episkopoi) and deacons of the church there. The fact that his reference is to bishops (in the plural) and that they are unnamed has led to some conjecture over their identity. One possibility is Erastus, the city treasurer, though Epaphroditus (Paul's emissary) is another possibility. It may also be that the church of Philippi was led by women like Lydia or Euodia and Syntyche. The issue is further complicated by the fact that Polycarp's letter to the Philippians of about 160 is not addressed to a bishop but to the congregation.

Known bishops include:

- Porphyrios of Philippi, who was present at the Council of Serdica (343)
- Saint Theonestus of Philippi (425)
- Sozon of Philippi (451)
- Demetrius fl. 531.
- Bishop Ambrose of Philippi
- Epaphroditus
- Flavanius (Council of Ephesus)
- Bishop Chrysostomos of Philippi

== Bibliography ==
- Kiminas, Demetrius (2009). The Ecumenical Patriarchate: A History of Its Metropolitanates with Annotated Hierarch Catalogs. Wildside Press LLC. ISBN 9781434458766.
