= Dionysius of Corinth =

2nd century Bishop of Corinth

Saint Dionysius of Corinth
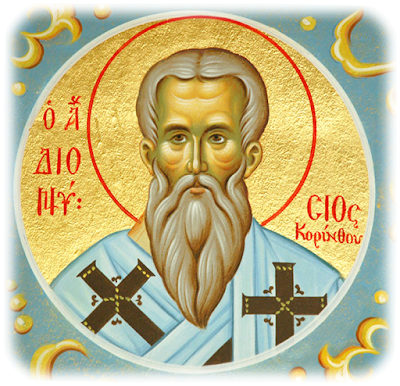

Bishop and Confessor
- Born: early to mid 2nd century AD
- Died: Corinth, Achaia, Roman Empire
- Venerated in: Catholic Church; Eastern Orthodox Church
- Feast: April 8

Dionysius of Corinth, (Greek: Διονύσιος ό Κορίνθιος) also known as Saint Dionysius, was the bishop of Corinth circa AD 171. His feast day is commemorated on April 8.

== Date ==
The date is established by the fact that he wrote to Pope Soter. Eusebius in his Chronicle placed his "floruit" in the eleventh year of the Emperor Marcus Aurelius (171). When Hegesippus was at Corinth in the time of Pope Anicetus, Primus was bishop (about 150–5), while Bacchylus was Bishop of Corinth at the time of the Paschal controversy (about 190–8). Dionysius is only known to us through Eusebius. Eusebius knew a collection of seven of the Catholic Letters to the Churches of Dionysius, together with a letter to him from Pinytus, Bishop of Knossos, and a private letter of spiritual advice to a lady named Chrysophora.

Eusebius mentions:

- a letter to the Lacedaemonians, teaching orthodoxy, and enjoining peace and union
- a letter to the Athenians, stirring up their faith exhorting them to live according to the Gospel, since they were not far from apostasy. Dionysius spoke of the recent martyrdom of their bishop, Publius (in the persecution of Marcus Aurelius), and says that Dionysius the Areopagite was the first Bishop of Athens
- a letter to the Nicomedians against Marcionism
- a letter to Gortyna and the other dioceses of Crete, praising their bishop, Philip, for efforts on behalf of the church and warning him of the distortions of heretics
- a letter to the Church of Amastris in Pontus, written at the instance of Bacchylides and Elpistus (otherwise unknown), mentioning the bishop's name as Palmas; he wrote in this letter of marriage and celibacy, and recommended the charitable treatment of those who had fallen away into sin or heresy
- a letter to Pinytus, bishop of Knossus, recommending that he should not lay the yoke of celibacy too heavily on his brethren, but consider their weakness. Pinytus replied, after polite words, that he hoped Dionysius would send strong meat next time so his people might not grow up on the milk of babes.

But the most important letter is the seventh one, addressed to the Romans, and the only one from which extracts have been preserved. Pope Soter had sent alms and a letter to the Corinthians, and in response Dionysius wrote:

For this has been your custom from the beginning, to do good to all the brethren in many ways, and to send alms to many Churches in different cities, now relieving the poverty of those who asked aid, now assisting the brethren in the mines by the alms you send, Romans keeping up the traditional custom of Romans, which your blessed bishop, Soter, has not only maintained, but has even increased, by affording to the brethren the abundance which he has supplied, and by comforting with blessed words the brethren who came to him, as a father his children.

Again:

You also by this instruction have mingled together the Romans and Corinthians who are the planting of Peter and Paul. For they both came to our Corinth and planted us, and taught alike; and alike going to Italy and teaching there, were martyred at the same time.

Again:

Today we have kept the holy Lord's day, on which we have read your letter, which we shall ever possess to read and to be admonished, even as the former one written to us through Clement.

== Sources ==
- Urdang, Laurence. Holidays and Anniversaries of the World. Detroit:Gale Research Company, 1985. ISBN 0-8103-1546-7.
