= Antoniev =

Antoniev may refer to:

- Antoniev Monastery in Veliky Novgorod, Russia
- Antonievo-Siysky Monastery in Archangelsk Oblast, Russia
