= Cephas of Iconium =

Orthodox saint

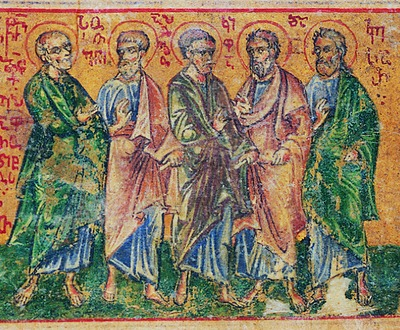
Epaphroditus, Sosthenes, Apollos, Cephas and Caesar

Cephas of Iconium (Greek: Κηφᾶς Ἰκονίου) is numbered among the Seventy Disciples, and was bishop of Iconium or Colophon, Pamphylia. The name "Cephas" is Aramaic for "Peter".

The Eastern Orthodox Church remembers St. Cephas on March 30 with Apostles Sosthenes, Apollos, Caesar, and Epaphroditus; and on December 8 with the same apostles and Onesiphorus. Apostles of the 70 were hand-picked (chosen) and sent by Jesus himself to preach. They were chosen some time after the selection of the Twelve Apostles. All seventy are commemorated by the Orthodox Church on January 4.
