= Epistle to Corinth =

Lost epistle in the New Testament

The Epistle to Corinth was a letter written by the 'brethren' (Greek: οι αδελφοι) of the early Christian Church in Ephesus to the church in Corinth in Achaia, referred to in the Acts of the Apostles, commending the Corinthian church to welcome the preacher Apollos:

"And when [Apollos] desired to cross to Achaia, the brethren wrote, exhorting the disciples to receive him" (Acts 18:27).

The letter is now lost.

English biblical translators differ in their interpretation of the 'encouraging' (Greek: προτρεψάμενοι) role of the letter, as it can be interpreted as encouraging Apollos (e.g. the ASV translation: "the brethren encouraged him, and wrote to the disciples ..."), or as encouraging the Corinthian church (e.g. the Modern English Version: "the brothers wrote to encourage the disciples to welcome him"). The Pulpit Commentary suggests it is "rather more consonant to the structure of the sentence and to the probability of the case that the exhortation was addressed to the Corinthian Church, and not to Apollos, who needed no such encouragement".
