= Caesar of Dyrrhachium =

1st–century Christian Bishop in the Roman Empire

Saint Caesar of Dyrrhachium
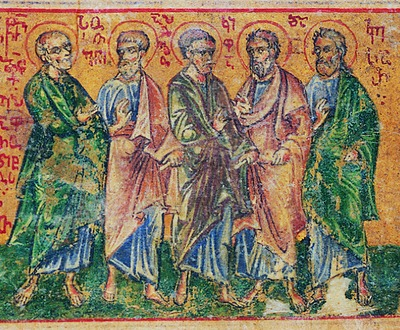
- Byzantine-styled fresco of Epaphroditus, Sosthenes, Apollos, Cephas and Caesar

First Bishop of Dyrrhachium Apostle of the Seventy
- Venerated in: Eastern Orthodox Church; Roman Catholic Church; Oriental Orthodox Churches; Anglican Communion; Lutheran Church
- Feast: 30th March; 8th December

Caesar of Dyrrhachium (Greek: Καίσαρ Δυρραχιού) is numbered among the Seventy Disciples, and was bishop of Dyrrhachium, a city of Epirus in modern Albania.

== Life ==
Caesar was one of the Seventy Disciples, who may also be known in traditions from Eastern Christianity as the seventy apostles (Greek: ἑβδομήκοντα απόστολοι, hebdomikonta apostoloi). The apostles were early emissaries of Jesus mentioned in the Gospel of Luke. The number of those disciples varies between either 70 or 72 depending on the manuscript.

Caesar was ordained by Paul the Apostle as the first bishop of Dyrrhachium. Paul's letter to the Philippians, Caesar is mentioned in the verse 4:22.

== Legacy ==
The Church remembers St. Caesar on March 30 with Apostles Sosthenes, Apollos, Cephas, and Epaphroditus and on December 8 with the same apostles and Onesiphorus. He was the first bishop of Dyrrhachium (modern day Durrës, Albania). His position as bishop was succeeded by Saint Astius, an Albanian martyr who has a church dedicated to him in Durres.
