= Anthony of Siya =

Russian monk and saint (1478–1556)

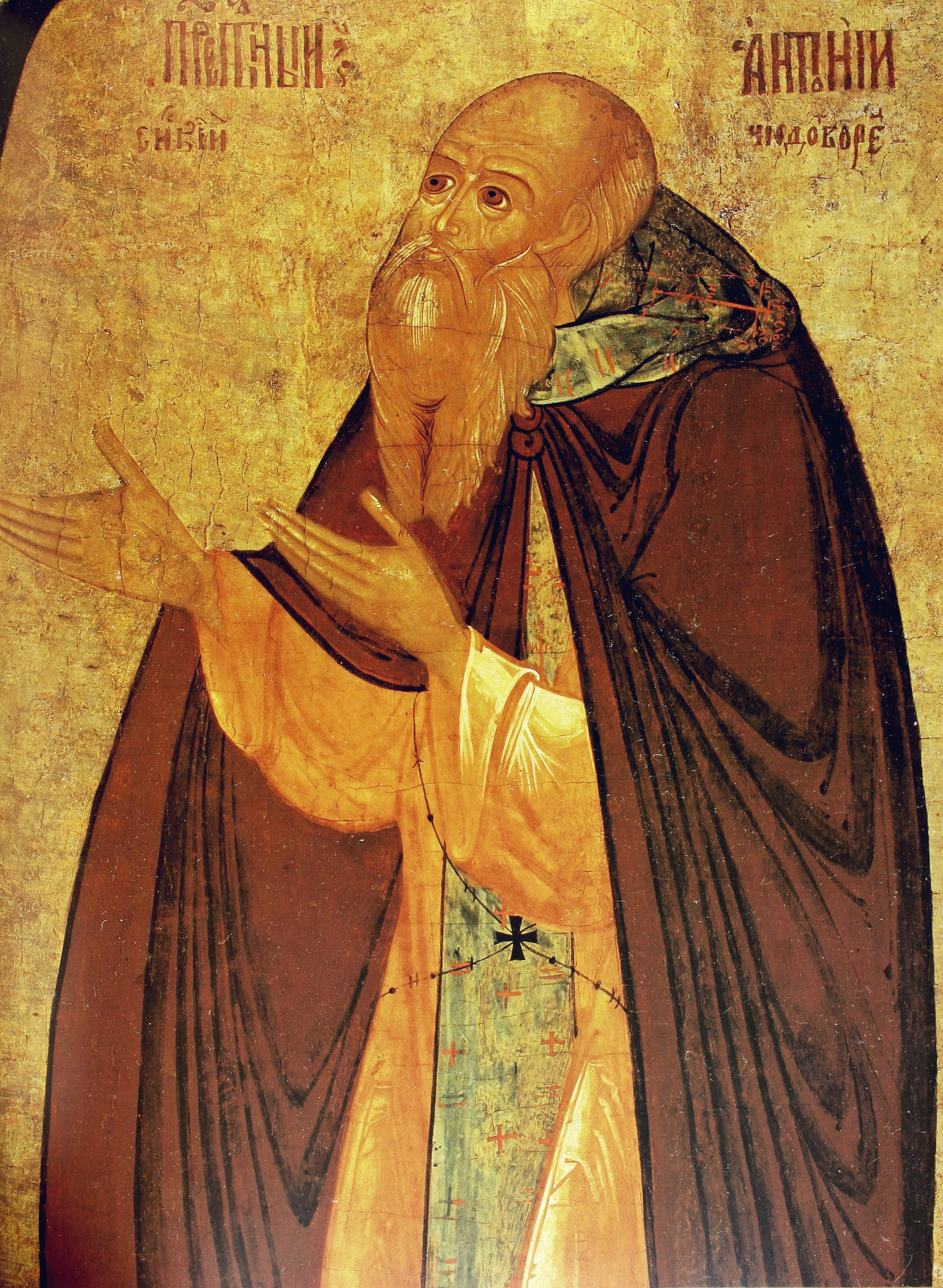
Russian icon depicting St. Anthony of Siya

Anthony of Siya (Russian: Антоний Сийский, romanized: Antony Siysky; 1478–1556) was a Russian Orthodox monk who was proclaimed a saint after his death. He founded the Antonievo-Siysky Monastery on the Siya River, a tributary of the Northern Dvina, in modern Arkhangelsk Oblast, in the Russian North. He was the last significant monastic saint.

== Life ==
Anthony was born a peasant in 1478. He married while a young man and was a normal peasant until after the death of his wife. He then entered the monastery at Kargopol. He did not stay there long and afterward became a wandering monk along the shores of the Arctic Ocean.

In 1520, Anthony founded his monastery. He received permission from Vasily III to erect monastic buildings on state land. He also was a vocal advocate of monastic control of peasant villages. Anthony's monastery was under the ecclesiastical control of the archbishop of Novgorod within the Russian Church. He died in 1556.

== Legacy ==
Vasily's grandson, Ivan, wrote a biography on Anthony. The monk Jonah also wrote a vita (life) of Anthony in 1578. Anthony was recognized as a saint of national importance in 1610.

In The Life of and Miracles of Antony Siysky, it begins with:

About a certain priest, he that the venerable Antonii punished for his lack of faith by a certain phenomenon. And afterwards healing gave to him, [the priest] having vowed to honour [Antonii].

== Sources ==
- Bushkovitch, Paul (18 March 2021). Succession to the Throne in Early Modern Russia: The Transfer of Power 1450–1725. Cambridge University Press. ISBN 978-1-108-47934-9.
- Wieczynski, Joseph L., ed. (1976). "Antonii Siiskii". The Modern Encyclopedia of Russian and Soviet History. Vol. 2. Gulf Breeze, Florida: Academic International Press. p. 46. ISBN 0-87569-064-5.
