= Balaban Aga Mosque =

Demolished mosque in Istanbul, Turkey

- Balaban Ağa Mescidi
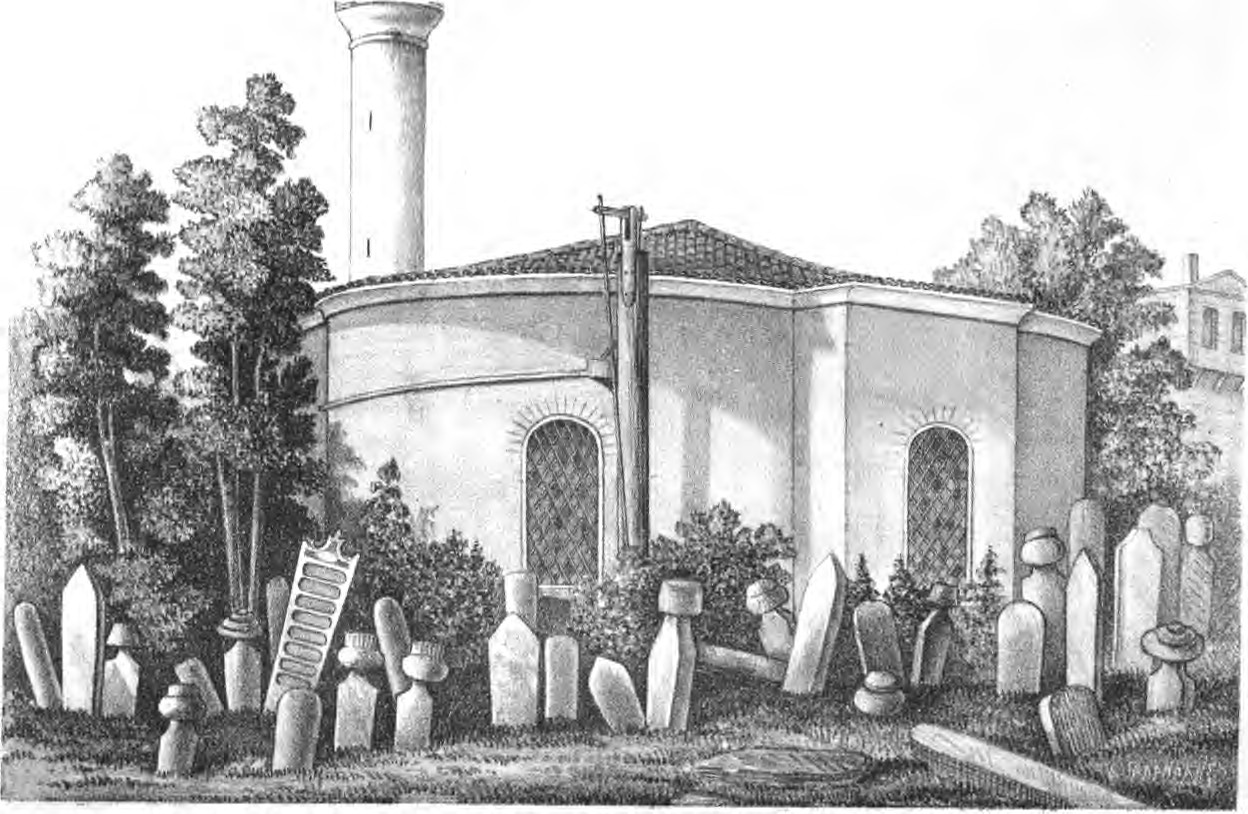
- The Mosque in a drawing of 1877, from A.G. Paspates' Byzantine topographical studies

- Location within Istanbul Fatih

General information
- Type: Mosque
- Architectural style: Early Byzantine
- Location: Istanbul, Turkey
- Coordinates: 41.0110°N 28.9583°E
- Construction started: Fifth or sixth century
- Demolished: 1930

Balaban Aga Mosque (full name in Turkish: Balaban Ağa Mescidi, where mescit is the Turkish word for a small mosque) was a mosque in Istanbul, Turkey, converted from a former Byzantine building. Its usage during the Byzantine era is unclear. The small edifice - pulled down in 1930 to open a new road - was a minor example of architecture of the Byzantine early period in Constantinople.

== Location ==
The structure was located in Istanbul, in the district of Fatih, in the neighborhood of Balabanağa, in the middle of today's Harikzadeler Sokak, the road whose opening caused the demolition of the building. The edifice lay between the mosque of Laleli and the road that goes from the Mosque of Beyazit to the Gate of Edirne.

== History ==
Nothing is known about the history of this small round building, erected between the fifth and the sixth century, during Byzantine times. According to some scholars it could have been a burial place, while others think that it was the library of a monastery. In the 13th century an almost square burial room was erected, making certain the usage of the building as a mausoleum in the Palaiologan period.

Shortly after the Fall of Constantinople to the Ottomans in 1453, under Beyazid II, the building was converted into a mosque by Sekbanbaşı - that is, chief (Turkish: Agha) of the Janissaries - Balaban Ağa bin Abdullah. The correspondent endowment (Turkish: vakif) was founded in 1483. The mosque lay in the quarter named Eski Odalar (English: old barracks) after the lodging of the Janissaries, and was repeatedly hit by the fires which ravaged the neighborhood in 1660, 1693 and 1718. During the great fire of 1782 the building partially burned and was afterward restored changing its plan. The fire of 1911 severely damaged the edifice, which in 1930 was demolished after a short surveying of the museum department, since it lay in the middle of a planned new road.

== Description ==
The building had originally a round plan with an outer diameter of 11.2 m, and was perhaps surmounted by a dome. On the south side there was a rectangular apse. The interior was hexagonal, and each side was adorned with a rectangular niche. Surveys executed before the demolition revealed window-like openings in the foundation (made of rubble) which hint to the presence of a crypt also during the early phase of the building. The brickwork of the above ground structure was made with freestone interlined with clay bricks. The Palaiologan-era burial chamber, measuring 2.9 m x 3.17 m, was covered with a flat dome. During the conversion into a mosque, the old entrance was closed with masonry because of the erection of the minaret, and a new entrance on the northwest side was opened. In the last phase of its life the edifice had a wooden roof and kept its internal hexagonal plant, with a deeply arched recess on each side, five of them bearing a window and one the entrance gate. Outside the building showed four alternating sides, two circular bearing two windows each and two projecting bays bearing respectively one window and the entrance gate. In front of the building the Ottomans erected a porch. During the demolition in 1930 traces of paintings stemming from the Palaiologan period could be still observed. On that occasion some architectural elements were dismantled and since then have been kept at the Istanbul Archaeology Museum.

== Sources ==
- Van Millingen, Alexander (1912). Byzantine Churches of Constantinople. London: MacMillan & Co.
- Janin, Raymond (1953). La Géographie Ecclésiastique de l'Empire Byzantin. 1. Part: Le Siège de Constantinople et le Patriarcat Oecuménique. 3rd Vol. : Les Églises et les Monastères (in French). Paris: Institut Français d'Etudes Byzantines.
- Müller-Wiener, Wolfgang (1977). Bildlexikon zur Topographie Istanbuls: Byzantion, Konstantinupolis, Istanbul bis zum Beginn d. 17 Jh (in German). Tübingen: Wasmuth. ISBN 9783803010223.
