= Bacchylus =

Bacchylus was a second century Bishop of Corinth who was known for supporting Papal claims, and writings on the passover.
