= Euodia and Syntyche =

Mentioned in Phillipians Chapter 4 :2

Euodia (Greek Εὐοδία, meaning unclear, but possibly "sweet fragrance" or "prosperous journey") and Syntyche (Συντύχη, "fortunate," literally "with fate") are people mentioned in the New Testament. They were female members of the church in Philippi, and according to the text of Philippians 4: 2–3, they were involved in a disagreement together. The author of the letter, Paul the Apostle, whose writings generally reveal his concern that internal disunity will seriously undermine the church, beseeched the two women to "agree in the Lord".

== Gender Confusion in the King James Version ==
Despite the clear context and gender agreement of the original Greek text, the King James Version incorrectly assigns Euodia the name "Euodias" (a theoretically projected male gender version of the name) and thus makes the quarrel appear to be between a man and a woman. According to some sources, there was a historical theory that Euodias (male) was the jailer of Philippi (see Acts 16: 25–34) and Syntyche was his wife. This theory is rejected by modern scholarship, not least because of the clarity in the original text that both characters are female. As a Roman colony, Philippi gave a level of independence to women that was not common in most Greek cities of the period; this may account for the prominence of the women and their disagreement.

Studies of contemporary naming conventions have shown that whilst the female versions Euodia and Syntyche were both common to the era, the projected male variants (such as Euodias, as in the King James Version, or Syntyches) are totally unknown in writings or inscriptions of the period.

There are references to a "Euodia" (again mistaking the name as a male form) in the document Apostolic Constitutions, which purports to be a set of writings of the twelve Apostles of Jesus, but is in fact a spurious source, dated to the fourth century AD, and believed to originate in Syria.

== Models of female leadership ==
Not surprisingly, Euodia and Syntyche are chiefly remembered as two people who had an argument, and their names are most commonly associated with disagreement. However, for some commentators, as also for some church institutions, there is further significance in the implied leadership role of the two women within the Philippian church.

This leadership role is not clearly defined. Some have speculated that it constituted ordained ministry, but this is not explicitly supported by any biblical source. The leadership role is implied both by Paul's interest in their argument, and by the language used by Paul in addressing their disagreement. Peter Toon points out that they had at least "worked with him [Paul] in spreading the gospel". William Barclay contends that whatever their actual function, the fact that they were "women playing so leading a part in the affairs of one of the early congregations" is in sufficient contrast to the contemporary social order to be noteworthy. Richard Fellows and Alistair Stewart have recently argued that they were householder-patrons.

== Unnamed arbitrator ==
In an unsolved mystery, arising in verse 3 of the passage, Paul calls upon an unnamed individual, charging him to intervene directly to assist in ending the quarrel between Euodia and Syntyche. According to different translations, Paul addresses this person as "my true yokefellow" or "my true comrade". This has led to speculation about the identity of this helper. Timothy, Silas, and others have been suggested. Timothy may perhaps be considered less likely, as he is named in the introduction as a fellow author of the letter, with Paul (Philippians 1:1). Peter Toon, in his commentary, wrote "His identity is not known, but he was probably a respected and influential member of the church whose word would be heeded". William Barclay, after discussing various possible identities, states "Maybe the best suggestion is that the reference is to Epaphroditus, the bearer of the letter."

Fellows and Stewart have suggested, contrary to the prevailing opinion, that “the yokefellow is not an individual, but an apostrophe for the Philippian congregation”. According to them, Paul is aiming to “correct one or more Philippians for not being supportive of Euodia and Syntyche”.

== Conclusion of the argument ==
The exact nature of the disagreement is unknown. Matthew Henry's Complete Commentary, to which sections on the epistles were added posthumously by the editors under George Burder, introduces a theory that the women's argument may have been jointly prosecuted by them against the wider church, although it also posits the more traditional view that they disagreed with one another.

Either way, the commentary is clear that disagreement and disunity were undermining church life. There are no extant sources (biblical or otherwise) to suggest the outcome of the argument. Nonetheless, it is often cited in contemporary church life as part of a call to build unity within congregations and churches.

== Sources ==
- Philippians 1:1
- Philippians 4:2–3
- Hitchcock's Bible Names Dictionary
- New Testament Greek Lexicon
- Easton's Bible Dictionary, 1897
