= Dionysios Mantalos =

Greek Orthodox bishop (1952–2025)

His Eminence Dionysios Mantalos
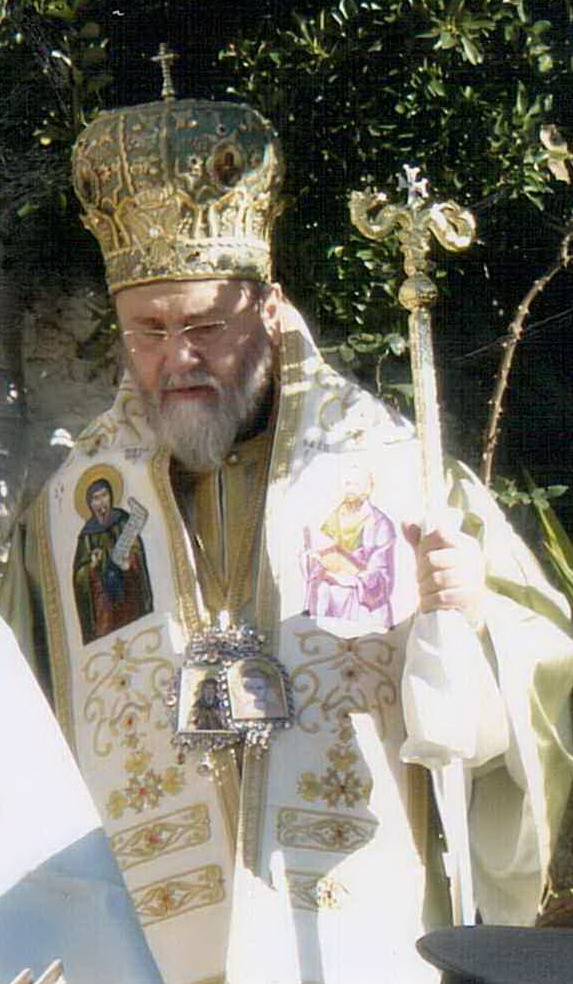
- Dionysios Mantalos in 2011
- Born: 29 October 1952; Neo Psychiko, Athens, Greece
- Died: 7 August 2025 (aged 72); Athens, Greece
- Occupation: Metropolitan bishop of Corinth

Dionysios Mantalos (Greek: Διονύσιος Μάνταλος; 29 October 1952 – 7 August 2025) was the Metropolitan bishop of Corinth. Mantalos was ordained bishop of Corinth in 2006 and held the position until his death in 2025. He was a graduate of the Theological School of Athens.

Mantalos was ordained deacon in 1974 and priest in 1979. He was a preacher (1977), commissioner (1978) and chancellor (1990) of the Holy Metropolis of Chalkis. He also served as deputy director of the Apostolic Diakonia (2002) and chancellor of the Holy Synod of the Orthodox Church of Greece (2006).

In Chalkis, Mantalos was responsible for the youth and the Sunday schools and he contributed to the creation of 25 cultural centers and camps in Ilia, Euboea. Besides that he was director of the boarding school of the Metropolis of Chalkis and also operated religious schools of training personnel. His fight against drugs was significant. He was chairman of the board of the "center of drug prevention" of Euboea.

He was ordained bishop of Corinth on 15 October 2006. In Corinth he continued his work with special emphasis on the youth. He published many books and gave numerous lectures, speeches and media interviews.

Mantalos died after a long struggle with cancer, on 7 August 2025, at the age of 72.
