= Apollos =

1st-century Alexandrian Jewish Christian

Saint Apollos
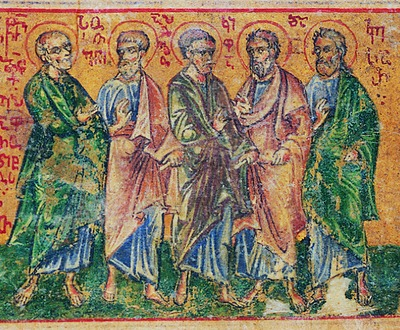
- Icon of Saints Epaphroditus, Sosthenes, Apollos, Cephas and Caesar, c. 1400s

Confessor
- Born: c. 1st century AD; Alexandria, Roman province of Egypt, Roman Empire
- Died: c. 1st century AD; Corinth, Achaia, Roman Empire
- Venerated in: Eastern Orthodox Church; Oriental Orthodox Churches; Catholic Church; Anglican Communion; Lutheranism
- Canonized: Pre-Congregation
- Feast: 13 February

Apollos (Ancient Greek: Ἀπολλώς) was a 1st-century Alexandrian Jewish Christian mentioned several times in the New Testament. A contemporary and colleague of Paul the Apostle, he played an important role in the early development of the churches of Ephesus and Corinth.

== Biblical account ==
=== Acts of the Apostles ===
Apollos is first mentioned as a Christian preacher who had come to Ephesus (probably in AD 52 or 53), where he is described as "being fervent in spirit: he spoke and taught accurately the things concerning Jesus, though he knew only the baptism of John".

Apollos was a devout Jew born in Alexandria. Apollos' origin in Alexandria has led to speculations that he would have preached in the allegorical style of Philo. Theologian Jerome Murphy-O'Connor, for example, commented: "It is difficult to imagine that an Alexandrian Jew ... could have escaped the influence of Philo, the great intellectual leader ... particularly since the latter seems to have been especially concerned with education and preaching." Stephen Patterson raises the issue that "just how an Alexandrian Jew like Apollos might have become acquainted with the teachings and practices" of Jesus and John the Baptist, two "Galilean rustics". He makes two "reasonable guesses", one that Apollos had made a pilgrimage to Jerusalem where he learned of these matters; the other that followers of Jesus and John had come to Alexandria "and initiated Apollos into their ways."

Priscilla and Aquila, a Jewish Christian couple who had come to Ephesus with the Apostle Paul, instructed Apollos:

When Priscilla and Aquila heard him, they took him aside and explained to him the way of God more adequately.

The differences between the two understandings probably related to the Christian baptism, since Apollos "knew only the baptism of John". Later, during Apollos' absence, the writer of the Acts of the Apostles recounts an encounter between Paul and some disciples at Ephesus:

And he said to them, "Did you receive the Holy Spirit when you believed?" And they said, "No, we have not even heard that there is a Holy Spirit." And he said, "Into what then were you baptized?" They said, "Into John's baptism." And Paul said, "John baptized with the baptism of repentance, telling the people to believe in the one who was to come after him, that is, Jesus." On hearing this, they were baptized in the name of the Lord Jesus. And when Paul had laid his hands on them, the Holy Spirit came on them, and they began speaking in tongues and prophesying.

Before Paul's arrival, Apollos had moved from Ephesus to Achaia and was living in Corinth, the provincial capital of Achaia. Acts reports that Apollos arrived in Achaia with a letter of recommendation from the Ephesian Christians and "greatly helped those who through grace had believed, for he powerfully refuted the Jews in public, showing by the Scriptures that the Christ was Jesus.

=== 1 Corinthians ===
Paul's First Epistle to the Corinthians (AD 55) mentions Apollos as an important figure at Corinth. Paul describes Apollos' role at Corinth:

I planted, Apollos watered, but God gave the growth.

Paul's Epistle refers to a schism between four parties in the Corinthian church, of which two attached themselves to Paul and Apollos respectively, using their names (the third and fourth were Peter, identified as Cephas, and Jesus Christ himself). It is possible, though, that, as Msgr. Ronald Knox suggests, the parties were actually two, one claiming to follow Paul, the other claiming to follow Apollos. "It is surely probable that the adherents of St. Paul [...] alleged in defence of his orthodoxy the fact that he was in full agreement with, and in some sense commissioned by, the Apostolic College. Hence 'I am for Cephas'. [...] What reply was the faction of Apollos to make? It devised an expedient which has been imitated by sectaries more than once in later times; appealed behind the Apostolic College itself to him from whom the Apostolic College derived its dignity; 'I am for Christ'." Paul states that the schism arose because of the Corinthians' immaturity in faith.

There is no indication that Apollos favored or approved an overestimation of his person. Paul urged him to go to Corinth at the time, but Apollos declined, stating that he would come later when he had an opportunity.

=== Epistle to Titus ===
Apollos is mentioned one more time in the New Testament. In the Epistle to Titus, the recipient is exhorted to "speed Zenas the Lawyer and Apollos on their way".

== Extrabiblical information ==
Jerome states that Apollos was so dissatisfied with the division at Corinth that he retired to Crete with Zenas; and that once the schism had been healed by Paul's letters to the Corinthians, Apollos returned to the city and became one of its elders. Less probable traditions assign to him the bishopric of Duras, or of Iconium in Phrygia, or of Caesarea.

Pope Benedict XVI suggested that the name "Apollos" was probably short for Apollonius or Apollodorus. He also suggested there were those in Corinth "...fascinated by [Apollos’] way of speaking...."

== Significance ==
Martin Luther and some modern scholars have proposed Apollos as the author of the Epistle to the Hebrews, rather than Paul or Barnabas. Both Apollos and Barnabas were Jewish Christians with sufficient intellectual authority. The Pulpit Commentary treats Apollos' authorship of Hebrews as "generally believed". Other than this, there are no known surviving texts attributed to Apollos.

Apollos is regarded as a saint by several Christian churches, including the Lutheran Church–Missouri Synod, which hold a commemoration for him, together with saints Aquila and Priscilla, on 13 February. Apollos is considered one of the 70 apostles and his feast day is 8 December in the Eastern Orthodox church.

Apollos is not to be confused with St. Apollo of Egypt, a monk who died in 395 and whose feast day is 25 January. Apollos does not have a feast day of his own in the traditional Roman Martyrology, nor is he reputed to have ever been a monk (as most monks come after St. Anthony the Great).
