= Onesiphorus =

Christian martyr

Saint Onesiphorus
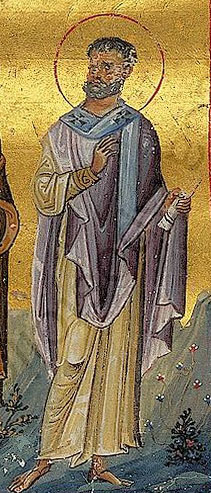
- Onesiphorus, from the Menologion of Basil II.
- Died: Parium, Asia, Roman Empire
- Venerated in: Eastern Orthodox Church; Roman Catholic Church
- Feast: 6 September (Catholic); 7 September (Orthodox)
- Attributes: Christian Martyrdom

Onesiphorus (Greek: Ονησιφόρος; meaning "bringing profit" or "useful") was a Christian referred to in the New Testament letter of Second Timothy (2 Tim 1:16–18 and 2 Tim 4:19). According to the letter sent by St. Paul, Onesiphorus sought out Paul who was imprisoned at the time in Rome.

== Life ==
According to Orthodox tradition, Saint Onesiphorus was one of the seventy disciples chosen and sent by Jesus to preach. They were chosen some time after the selection of the Twelve Apostles (Luke 10:1-24). St Onesiphorus was bishop at Colophon (Asia Minor), and later at Corinth. Both the Orthodox and Roman Catholic churches hold that he died a martyr in the city of Parium on the shores of the Hellespont.

== 2 Timothy ==
The persecution of Christians during Nero’s reign made Rome a dangerous city for Christians. Paul praises Onesiphorus for his hospitality, kindness, and courage. Onesiphorus is contrasted with the other Christians in Asia who have deserted Paul at this time. In 2 Timothy 1:16-18, Paul sends a greeting to the man’s household in Ephesus and refers to the help he showed Paul earlier in Ephesus. Timothy, who led the Ephesian church is familiar with these acts. Paul's praise of Onesiphorus is significant because it was written shortly before Paul's death as a final encouragement to Timothy.

But now, at the time of correspondence, only "Luke alone is with (Paul)" (4:11). Because Paul speaks of Onesiphorus only in the past tense, wishes blessings upon his house (family), and mercy for him "in that day", some scholars believe that Onesiphorus had at this point died. Towards the end of the same letter, in 2 Timothy 4:19, Paul sends greetings to "Priscilla and Aquila, and the house of Onesiphorus", again apparently distinguishing the situation of Onesiphorus from that of the still-living Priscilla and Aquila. Paul's reference to Onesiphorus, along with 2 Maccabees 12:40–46, is cited by Catholics as one of the early examples of prayer for the dead, while some Protestants opposing this practice reject such an interpretation.

Remarkably, Onesiphorus made a 1000-mile journey, over three large bodies of water from one continent to another (from Ephesus to Rome) — to specifically search for and find Paul in prison, so as to comfort him.

He is commemorated on September 6 in the Roman Catholic Church, and September 7 in the Orthodox Church.

He should not be confused with the Onesiphorus of Ephesus who was martyred with Porphyrius during the Diocletian persecution, and is commemorated on November 9.
