= Epaphroditus =

Biblical figure, saint

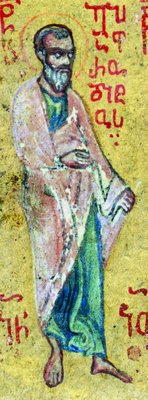

Apostle of the Seventy
- Born: c. 1st century AD (?); Philippi, Macedonia, Roman Empire
- Died: c. 1st century AD (?); Philippi, Macedonia, Roman Empire
- Venerated in: Eastern Orthodox Church; Roman Catholic Church
- Feast: 30 March (Eastern Orthodox); 22 March (Roman Catholic)

Epaphroditus (Greek: Ἐπαφρόδιτος) is a New Testament figure appearing as an envoy of the Philippian church to assist the Apostle Paul (Philippians 2:25-30). He is regarded as a saint of the Eastern Orthodox Church and the Roman Catholic Church, first Bishop of Philippi, and of Andriaca (there are at least two ancient towns called Andriaca, one in Thrace and one in Asia Minor), and first Bishop of Terracina, Italy. There is little evidence that these were all the same man.

== Name ==
Epaphroditus appears in the New Testament in the letters to the Philippians (2:25-30, 4:18). This is a “common personal name”, being derived from Aphrodite meaning “lovely” or “charming”; moreover, the proper name is found in the papyri with alternative spelling (81-2 B.C.) – Epaphrodeitos, Epaphrodeiton. The name corresponds to the Latin Venustus (= handsome), and was very common in the Roman period. "The name occurs very frequently in inscriptions both Greek and Latin, whether at full length Epaphroditus, or in its contracted form Epaphras."

Its adjectival use is also evident in the papyrus from the late second century A.D., “during the delightful [te epaphrodeito] praefecture of Larcius Memor”.

Some link Epaphroditus with another proper name in the New Testament, Epaphras (Colossians 1:7, 4:12; Philemon 23), with the suggestion that the latter is a “contracted” or “pet form” for the Philippian envoy. However, this is a coincidence with no indication that it is the same person.

== Biography ==
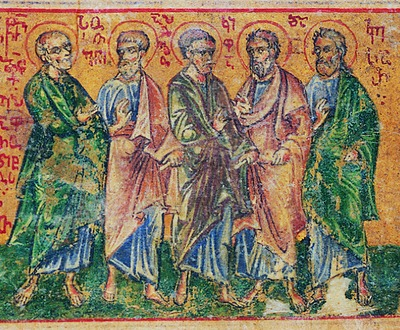
Epaphroditus, Sosthenes, Apollos, Chefa and Caesar.

Epaphroditus was a fellow Christian missionary of St. Paul's and is mentioned only in Philippians 2:25 and 4:18.

Epaphroditus was the delegate of the Christian community at Philippi, sent with their gift to Paul during his first imprisonment at Rome or at Ephesus. Paul, in 2:25, calls him "my brother and fellow-worker and fellow-soldier." "The three words are arranged in an ascending scale: common sympathy, common work, common danger and toil and suffering." He is described as an authoritative delegate (messenger). He was sent also as minister (λειτουργός) to Paul's need (2:25), doing for Paul what the Philippian community was unable to do (2:30). The designation leitourgos derives from Greek civic use, indicating “public servant,” often one with financial resources to fulfill his functions, so Epaphroditus may have been not only an official of the Philippian church, but a person of means, able to supplement that community's gift to Paul (4:18).

On his arrival, Epaphroditus devoted himself to "the work of Christ," both as Paul's attendant and as his assistant in missionary work. So assiduously did he labor that he lost his health, and in the words of Paul, "he was ill, and almost died." He recovered, however, and Paul sent him back to Philippi with this letter to quiet the alarm of his friends, who had heard of his serious illness. Paul besought for him that the church should receive him with joy and 'honour men like him' (2:29).

The Biblical commentator William Barclay suggested that Epaphroditus might be the most likely person to be identified with the unnamed arbitrator upon whom Paul called (in his epistle) to intervene in the disagreement between church members Euodia and Syntyche.

Hippolytus' list of the Seventy Disciples includes "Epaphroditus, bishop of Andriace."
