= Sosthenes =

Biblical character in the Acts of the Apostles

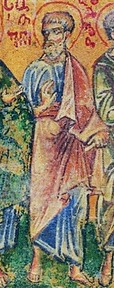
Sosthenes

Sosthenes /ˈsɒsθə.niːz/ (Greek: Σωσθένης, Sōsthénēs, "safe in strength") was the chief ruler of the synagogue at Corinth, who, according to the Acts of the Apostles, was seized and beaten by the mob in the presence of Gallio (c. 5 BC – c. AD 65), the Roman governor, when Gallio refused to proceed against Paul (c. 5 – c. 64/65 AD) at the instigation of the Jews (Acts 18:12–17). The motives of this assault against Sosthenes are not recorded. Some manuscripts assert the mob was composed of "Greeks" (Acts 18:17) while others read "Jews".

Some historians, beginning with Eusebius, identify this Sosthenes with a companion of Paul the Apostle referred to as "Sosthenes our brother" (Greek: Σωσθένης ὁ ἀδελφός, Sōsthénēs ho adelphós, literally "Sosthenes the brother"), a convert to the Christian faith and co-author of the First Epistle to the Corinthians (1 Corinthians 1:1–2). It is not clear whether this identification is tenable. According to Protestant theologian Heinrich Meyer, "Theodoret and most commentators, including Flatt, Billroth, Ewald, Maier [and] Hofmann, identify Sosthenes with the person so named in Acts 18:17, but this is denied by Michaelis, Pott, Rückert, and de Wette". The name was a common one.

It has also been suggested that Sosthenes is a later name of Crispus, who is mentioned in Acts 18:8 and 1 Corinthians 1:14, but Strong and McClintock say this "is arbitrary and unsupported".

He is traditionally listed among the Seventy Disciples of Luke 10:1.
