= Claudius' expulsion of Jews from Rome =

Mid-1st century AD expulsion of Jews from Rome by Emperor Claudius

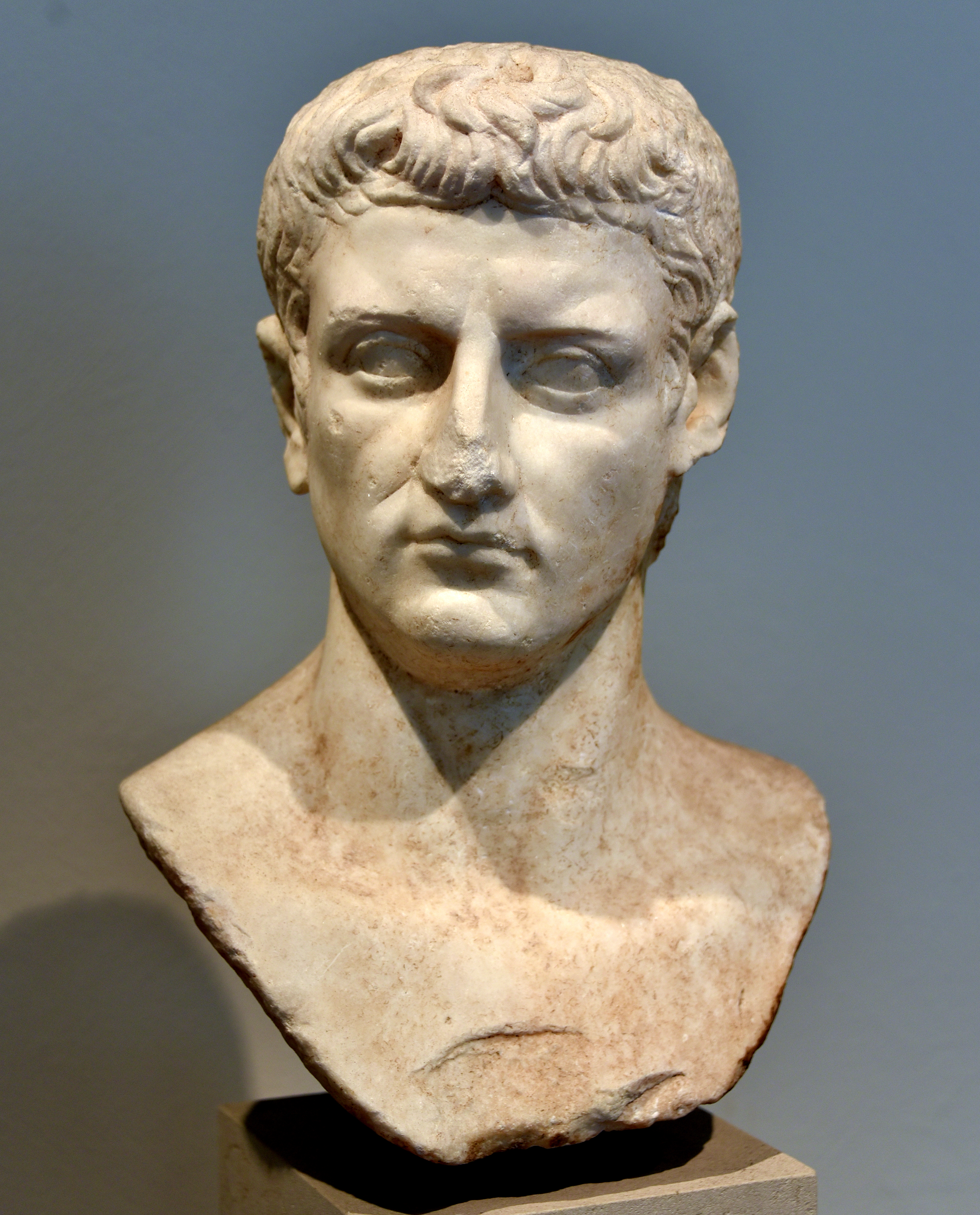
Portrait of Claudius, Altes Museum, Berlin

References to an expulsion of Jews from Rome by the Roman emperor Claudius, who was in office AD 41–54, appear in the Acts of the Apostles (18:2), and in the writings of Roman historians Suetonius (c. AD 69 – c. AD 122), Cassius Dio (c. AD 150 – c. 235) and fifth-century Christian author Paulus Orosius. Scholars generally agree that these references refer to the same incident.

The exact date is uncertain. The maximal time window for the expulsion of Jews from Rome is from January AD 41 until January AD 53. More detailed estimates, such as those based on the AD 49 date by Orosius or the reduction of the AD 53 upper limit due to Proconsul Gallio's health, are possible but controversial.

== Context ==
There were at least two expulsions of Jews from Rome before the reign of the Roman emperor Claudius. In 139 BC, the Jews were expelled after being accused of missionary efforts. Then, in AD 19, Tiberius once again expelled Jews from the city, for defrauding the noblewoman Fulvia. Josephus reports in Antiquities of the Jews (Book 18, Chapter 3, 5) that approximately 4,000 Jews were banished to Sardinia in this incident.

== Acts of the Apostles ==
The author of the Acts of the Apostles (Acts 18:1-18) explains how the Apostle Paul met Priscilla and Aquila and mentions in passing an expulsion of Jews from Rome:

After this, Paul left Athens and went to Corinth. 2 There he met a Jew named Aquila, a native of Pontus, who had recently come from Italy with his wife Priscilla, because Claudius had ordered all Jews to leave Rome. Paul went to see them, 3 and because he was a tentmaker as they were, he stayed and worked with them. 4 Every Sabbath he reasoned in the synagogue, trying to persuade Jews and Greeks.

5 When Silas and Timothy came from Macedonia, Paul devoted himself exclusively to preaching, testifying to the Jews that Jesus was the Messiah. 6 But when they opposed Paul and became abusive, he shook out his clothes in protest and said to them, "Your blood be on your own heads! I am innocent of it. From now on I will go to the Gentiles."

7 Then Paul left the synagogue and went next door to the house of Titius Justus, a worshiper of God. 8 Crispus, the synagogue leader, and his entire household believed in the Lord; and many of the Corinthians who heard Paul believed and were baptized.

9 One night the Lord spoke to Paul in a vision: "Do not be afraid; keep on speaking, do not be silent. 10 For I am with you, and no one is going to attack and harm you, because I have many people in this city." 11 So Paul stayed in Corinth for a year and a half, teaching them the word of God.

12 While Gallio was proconsul of Achaia, the Jews of Corinth made a united attack on Paul and brought him to the place of judgment. 13 "This man," they charged, "is persuading the people to worship God in ways contrary to the law."

14 Just as Paul was about to speak, Gallio said to them, "If you Jews were making a complaint about some misdemeanor or serious crime, it would be reasonable for me to listen to you. 15 But since it involves questions about words and names and your own law—settle the matter yourselves. I will not be a judge of such things." 16 So he drove them off. 17 Then the crowd there turned on Sosthenes the synagogue leader and beat him in front of the proconsul; and Gallio showed no concern whatever.

18 Paul stayed on in Corinth for some time. Then he left the brothers and sisters and sailed for Ephesus, accompanied by Priscilla and Aquila.

=== Dating Acts by reference to Gallio or to Orosius ===
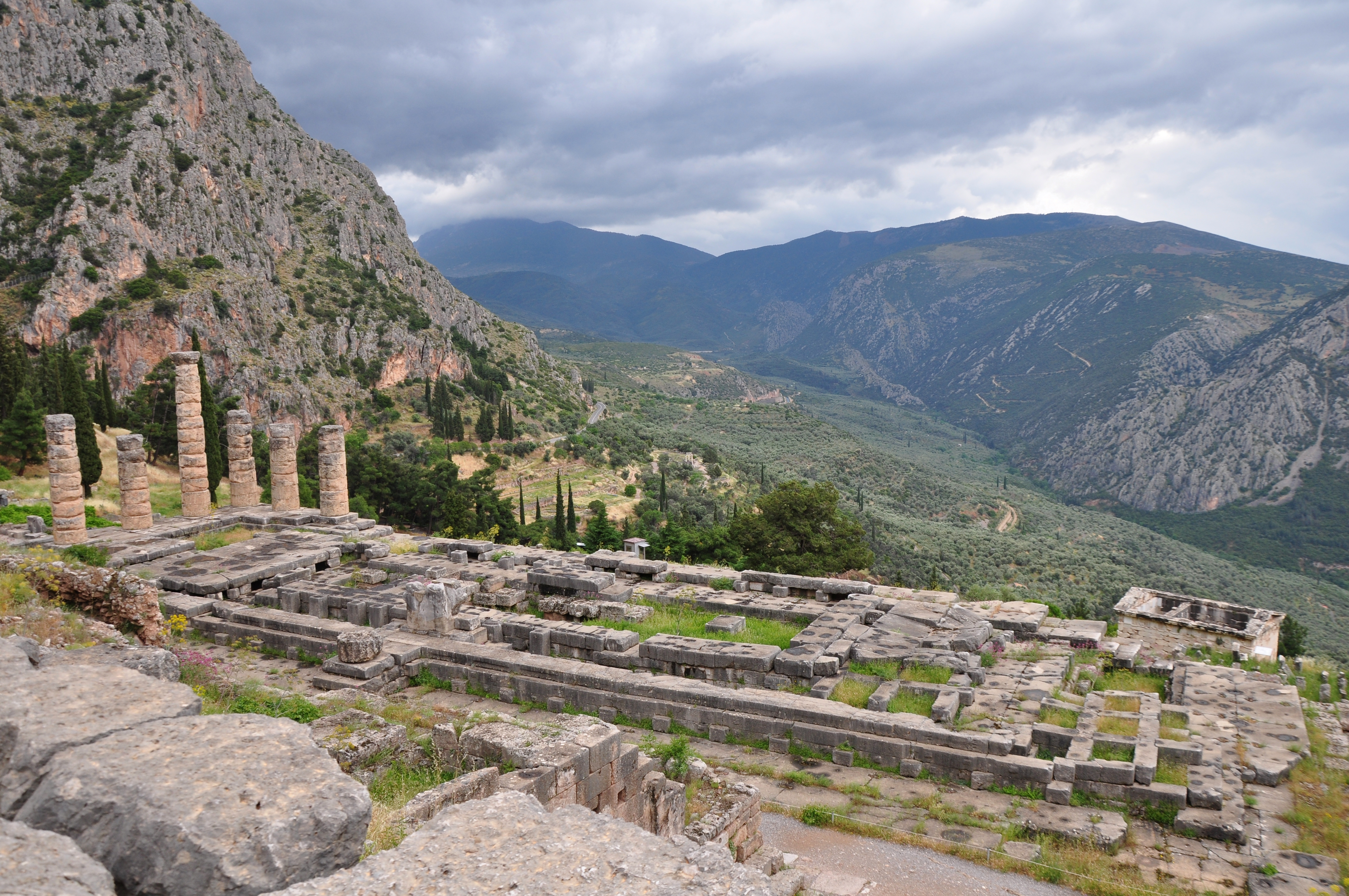
The Temple of Apollo, where the Delphi Inscription was discovered in the 20th century, used to date the proconsulship of Gallio which provides a peg for the chronology of Paul.

A fairly precise date for Acts 18:1-18 is derived from the mention of the proconsul Gallio in 18:12 and the existence of an inscription found at Delphi and published in 1905, preserving a letter from Claudius concerning Gallio dated during the 26th acclamation of Claudius, sometime between January AD 51 and August AD 52.

Ralph Novak states that the Delphi inscription clearly indicates that Gallio did not assume office any earlier than the spring of 50, adds that he may have served one or two years, and uses that to compute date ranges. Working from a date prior to August AD 52 for the Gallio inscription, Novak considers the possibility that Gallio served for two years and calculates a possible range for Gallio's term of office from late spring of AD 50 to early summer of AD 54 depending on whether the inscription reflects a date late in Gallio's consulship or early. Slingerland accepts a wide date range for Paul's trial similar to that of Novak for Gallio's consulship and states that Paul could have arrived in Corinth up to 18 months earlier than the earliest possible start of Gallio's term of office or a short time before the end of Gallio's latest date.

Udo Schnelle specifies that the reign of Gallio started in the summer of 51, and Craig S. Keener pinpoints the start of his term to July 51, although some scholars prefer 52.

An independent dating of Acts is sometimes based on a controversial AD 49 date for Claudius' edict, reported by Orosius (see section on Paulus Orosius below): According to Novak, if Claudius' edict were issued in January of 49 and Paul came to Corinth and met Aquila and Priscilla, within six or so months of the edict, then an eighteen-month stay in Corinth would indicate a date after late spring of 50 and many days before January of 51 for Paul's trial. At the other extreme, if Claudius' edict were issued in December of 49, using the same reasoning, the date of Paul's trial would be many days before the January of 52. Michael R. Cosby states that the dates 49-50 for the expulsion of Jews from Rome support the date from the trial of Paul in Corinth, and are consistent with the account of the activities of Priscilla and Aquila given in Acts 18:24-26.

In summary, the maximal time window for the expulsion of Jews from Rome is January AD 41 (the accession of Claudius) until January AD 53 (18 months prior to the latest possible end of Gallio's term and thus the latest date for Paul's trial). More detailed estimates such as those based on the AD 49 date of Orosius are possible but controversial.

=== The health of Gallio ===
Gallio's brother Seneca reports in Moral Epistles 104.1 that Gallio "began to develop a fever in Achaia and took ship at once, insisting that the disease was not of the body but of the place". Furthermore, Pliny the Elder states in his Natural History 31.33 that "There are besides many other uses, the chief being a sea voyage for those attacked by consumption, as I have said, and for haemoptysis, such as quite recently within our memory was taken by Annæus Gallio after his consulship."

Based on these references, Jerome Murphy-O'Connor and a number of other scholars conclude that it is likely that the tenure of Gallio in Corinth lasted less than a full year, and for health reasons Gallio left Corinth earlier, perhaps even before shipping on the Mediterranean stopped in October 51 due to winter storms. He argues that "it is impossible" to place Paul's trial by Gallio in the latter part of AD 51–52 and the trial must have happened between July when Gallio arrived in Corinth and September of 51. Murphy-O'Connor adds that this has "positive confirmation" in Galatians 2:1 which "places Paul in Jerusalem in AD 51".

On the other hand, Pliny the Elder refers to only one sea cure by Gallio, which was after he was consul presumably around AD 55, and neither Seneca nor Pliny explicitly suggest that Gallio deserted his Achaea posting not to return. Slingerland states that an argument regarding the shortening of Gallio's stay in Achaea due to health issues is "speculative".

=== Dating problems ===
Some scholars indicate difficulties trying to use Acts for strict chronological indications. Collins and Harrington state that Luke's account may be a conflation of various traditions and not entirely accurate. Jerome Murphy-O'Connor indicates that Acts 18 is "much less precise than appears at first sight." The expulsion was from Rome, but Aquila and Priscilla came from Italy, so they may have stayed in Italy after the expulsion, how long "no-one can say". He also questions the exactitude of what is meant by "recently"/"lately".

== Suetonius ==
A brief statement in Divus Claudius 25 mentions agitations by the "Jews" which led Claudius (Roman Emperor from AD 41 to 54) to expel them from Rome:

Since the Jews constantly made disturbances at the instigation of Chrestus, he [the Emperor Claudius] expelled them from Rome.

The expulsion event Suetonius refers to is necessarily later than AD 41, and earlier than AD 54. The expulsion is mentioned in the last quarter of a list of Claudius' actions during his reign. However, precisely dating the expulsion from Suetonius provides some challenges because Suetonius writes in a topical rather than chronological fashion, necessitating the use of other texts to pinpoint the time. The dating of the "edict of Claudius" for the expulsion of Jews relies on three separate texts beyond Suetonius' own reference, which in chronological order are: the reference to the trial of Apostle Paul by Gallio in the Acts of the Apostles (18:2), Cassius Dio's reference in History 60.6.6-7, and Paulus Orosius's fifth century mention in History 7.6.15-16 of a non-extant Josephus reference. Most scholars agree that the expulsion of Jews mentioned in the Book of Acts is consistent with this report by Suetonius. Donna Hurley notes that Acts provides a date of 49, but adds that neither Tacitus nor Dio "reports an expulsion in 49 or 50 as would be expected if there had been a large exodus of the Jewish community", concluding that '"all" is probably a hyperbole.'

The passage may suggest that in the mid-first century the Romans still viewed Christianity as a Jewish sect. Historians debate whether or not the Roman government distinguished between Christians and Jews prior to Nerva's modification of the Fiscus Judaicus in AD 96. From then on, practising Jews paid the tax, Christians did not.

Silvia Cappelletti describes Claudius' motivation as the need to control the population of Rome and prevent political meetings. (He "did not have an anti-Jewish policy.") Donna Hurley explains that Suetonius includes the expulsion "among problems with foreign populations, not among religions"

Louis Feldman states that most scholars assume that the disturbances were due to the spread of Christianity in Rome. Dunn states that the disturbances Suetonius refers to were probably caused by the objections of Jewish community to preachings by early Christians; Dunn moreover perceives confusion in Suetonius which would weaken the historical value of the reference as a whole. Lane states that the cause of the disturbance was likely the preachings of Hellenistic Jews in Rome and their insistence that Jesus was the Messiah, resulting in tensions with the Jews in Rome.

In contrast, E.A. Judge states that Suetonius later introduces Christians "in a way that leaves no doubt that he is discussing them for the first time" (i.e. in Nero 16), bringing into doubt an interpretation that Suetonius is dealing with Christians in Claudius 25.

Scholars are divided on the identity of "Chrestus" in the Suetonius reference. Some such as Craig A. Evans, John Meier and Craig S. Keener see it as a likely reference to Jesus. Menahem Stern said Suetonius was definitely referring to Jesus Christ, because he would have added "a certain" to Chrestus, if he had meant some unknown agitator.

Other scholars disagree: Stephen Benko sees "Chrestus" as an otherwise unknown agitator in Rome, whereas H. Dixon Slingerland sees him as someone who influenced Claudius to expel Jews. Although Silvia Cappelletti discounts Slingerland's view of Chrestus as a "too subtle" argument from silence, Neil Elliott states, "following H. Dixon Slingerland's meticulous work I do not believe any of us can assume the expulsion of some Jews under Claudius was the result of Christian agitation". The term Chrestus (from Gk χρηστός) was common at the time, particularly for slaves, meaning good or useful.

== Cassius Dio ==
Cassius Dio makes a comment in 60.6.6-7 regarding an action early in the reign of Claudius:

As for the Jews, who had again increased so greatly that by reason of their multitude it would have been hard without raising a tumult to bar them from the city [Rome], he [Claudius] did not drive them out, but ordered them, while continuing their traditional mode of life, not to hold meetings.

The similarities are noteworthy, for both Suetonius and Cassius Dio deal with Jews, tumult, Claudius, the city and expulsion, and Cassius Dio does provide a chronological context that points to the year AD 41. However, Cassius Dio does not mention Chrestus or any cause for the emperor's actions. Moreover, Cassius Dio says that Claudius did not drive the Jews out of the city, which prompts Slingerland to conclude that "Suetonius Claudius 25.4 does not refer to the event narrated in Dio 60.6.6-7." Rainer Riesner states that ancient historians generally hold that Cassius Dio here may have referred to an earlier, more limited action against some Jews, which was later expanded by Claudius to the expulsion of a larger group of Jews.

Raymond E. Brown states that Dio specifically rejects a general expulsion and it would be more reasonable to assume that only the most vocal people on either side of the Christ issue were expelled. Feldman states that the expulsion mentioned by Dio refers to the same event in Suetonius, but had a limited nature. Feldman states that given that Claudius' Jewish friend Agrippa I had been helpful in his ascent to the throne as in Ant 19.236-44, and given Claudius' actions in Ant 20.10-14 it seems hard to believe that Claudius would have expelled all the Jews due to a single agitator, soon after assuming the throne. Feldman states that the most likely explanation is that Claudius at first either expelled only the Christians or restricted public assembly by the Jews.

In general, Cassius Dio does not use the word "Christian" in his Roman History, and appears not to distinguish (or unable to distinguish) Jews from Christians. Given this viewpoint, the large Christian population in Rome that Cassius Dio witnesses in his own time (up to AD 229) would appear to him to conflict with any historical reports of massive Jewish expulsions, such as that of AD 41, thus providing the reason for Cassius Dio convincing himself that Jewish expulsions had not happened.

== Paulus Orosius ==
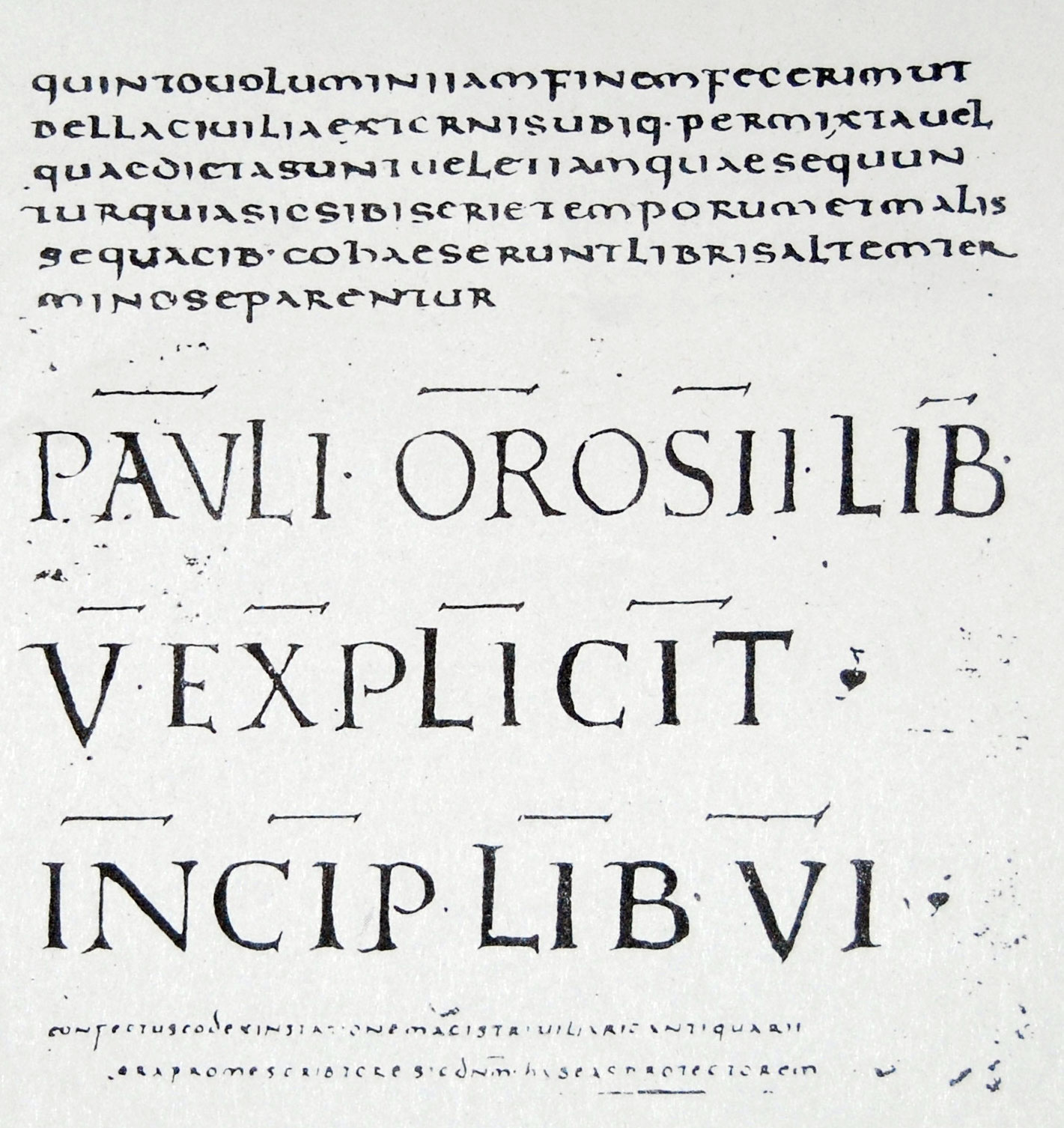
A page from a sixth-century Paulus Orosius Histories manuscript, Florence.

The 5th-century Christian writer Paulus Orosius makes a possible reference to the event, citing two sources:

Josephus reports, 'In his ninth year the Jews were expelled by Claudius from the city.' But Suetonius, who speaks as follows, influences me more: 'Claudius expelled from Rome the Jews constantly rioting at the instigation of Christ [Christo, or rather xpo].' As far as whether he had commanded that the Jews rioting against Christ [Christum] be restrained and checked or also had wanted the Christians, as persons of a cognate religion, to be expelled, it is not at all to be discerned.

The first source used by Orosius comes from a non-extant quote from Josephus. It is this which provides the date of AD 49. His second source is Suetonius Claudius 25.4.

Slingerland contends that Orosius made up the Josephus passage for which no scholar has been able to discover a source. He also argues that the writer is guilty of manipulating source materials for polemic purposes. Feldman states that "there is no such statement in the extant manuscripts of Josephus, and there is reason to believe that this version was created in the mind of Orosius himself." Philip Esler agrees with Slingerland that the AD 49 date "is a creation fully explicable within the tendentious historiography of this author."

However, E. M. Smallwood states that Orosius may have known of a passage from another author but confused the Josephus passage with it, or may have been quoting from memory. Silvia Cappelletti states that the change in spelling was probably not due to Orosius but to an intermediate source he consulted. Cappelletti also states that the lack of the Josephus text referred to does not undermine the authority of the date Orosius has suggested. Brown tactfully states, "Orosius is not famous for his impeccable accuracy," then adds that "such a date" (i.e. 49) "receives some confirmation from Acts." Bernard Green states that given that this section of Orosius' history is based on the chronological order of events, and that he refers to the expulsion only briefly and attaches no significance to it, Orosius seems to be "guiltlessly reporting" an event based on records he had seen. Rainer Riesner notes that it is not possible for Orosius to have derived the date of the expulsion that he wrote about from the Book of Acts.
