= Sopater =

New Testament figure

Sopater /ˈsɒpətər, ˈsoʊpətər/ (Greek: Σώπατρος, Sṓpatros) (Note: For meaning, "saviour of his father"; Easton's reads "The father who saves", Holman's reads "sound parentage") was the son of Pyrhus, a man from the city of Berea, mentioned in Acts 20:4. Sopater and others (Aristarchus and Secundus of the Thessalonians, and Gaius of Derbe, and Timothy, and Tychicus and Trophimus of Asia) accompanied Paul out of Macedonia after a group of Jews began to plot against Paul, and then sailed from Philippi to Alexandria Troas where they met Paul who had gone by land.

It is commonly accepted that Sopater was the kinsman of Paul noted in Romans 16:21 as Sosipater. although some writers think the words "the son of Pyrrhus" were added to distinguish Sopater from Sosipater.

Sosipater is honored as Saint Sosipater by the Eastern Orthodox Church with a feast day on 29 April.
