= Acts 21 =

- ← chapter 20 chapter 22 →
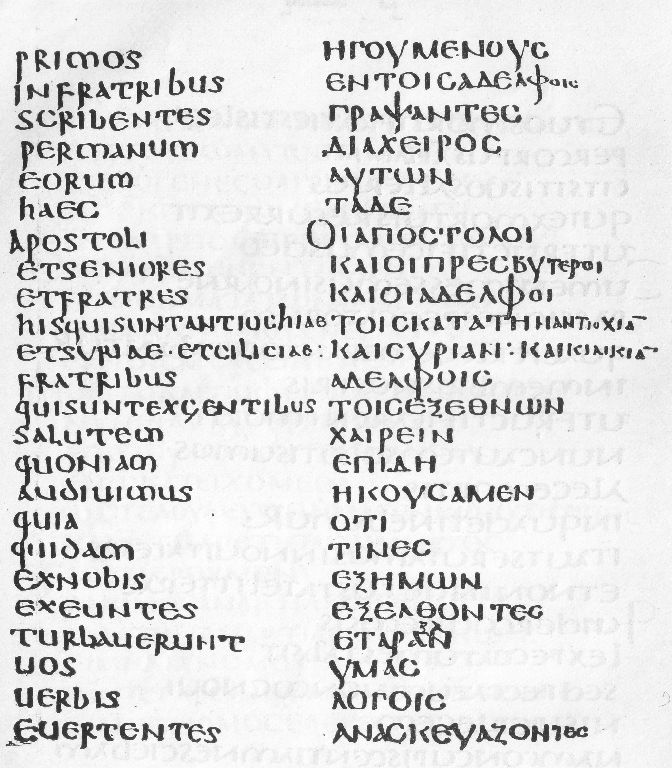
- Acts 15:22–24 in Latin (left column) and Greek (right column) in Codex Laudianus, written about AD 550.
- Book: Acts of the Apostles
- Category: Church history
- Christian Bible part: New Testament
- Order in the Christian part: 5

Acts 21 is the twenty-first chapter of the Acts of the Apostles in the New Testament of the Christian Bible. It records the end of Paul's third missionary journey and his arrival and reception in Jerusalem. The narrator and his companions ("we") play an active part in the developments in this chapter. Early Christian tradition uniformly affirmed that Luke composed this book as well as the Gospel of Luke. Critical opinion on the tradition was evenly divided at the end of the 20th century.

== Text ==
The original text was written in Koine Greek. This chapter is divided into 40 verses.

=== Textual witnesses ===
Some early manuscripts containing the text of this chapter are:

- Codex Vaticanus (AD 325–350)
- Codex Sinaiticus (330–360)
- Codex Bezae (c. 400)
- Codex Alexandrinus (400–440)
- Codex Ephraemi Rescriptus (c. 450; extant verses 1–30)
- Codex Laudianus (c. 550)

== Locations ==
Places mentioned in (blue) and related to (black) this chapter.

This chapter mentions the following places (in order of appearance):

- Cos
- Rhodes
- Patara
- Phoenicia
- Cyprus
- Syria
- Tyre
- Jerusalem, Judea
- Ptolemais
- Caesarea

== Journey from Miletus to Jerusalem (verses 1–16) ==
This "we" section (which includes the narrator) resumes the record. Alexander refers to the narrator's "customary wealth of detail" in this section, including "the itemized stages of the voyage, and the redundant detail of ships and cargoes". The narrative follows Paul's journey from Miletus, stopping in Tyre (verse 3), Ptolemais (verse 7), and Caesarea (verse 8), before heading to Jerusalem (verse 15), incorporating 'prophetic warnings' (verses 4, 11) and a 'solemn farewell' (verses 6, 14) to 'exemplify and reinforce the tone of Paul's address' in Acts 20:23 while presenting Paul as a "martyr", who 'exhibits a properly philosophical courage in the face of death', whereas his friends 'can only acquiesce in the divine will' (verse 14). It is comparable to the scene of Socrates' death (in Plato's Phaedo, 1170–1) with his last words: 'If so it is pleasing to God, so let it be' (Epict. Diss. 1.29.18-19).

=== Verse 8 ===
And the next day we that were of Paul's company departed, and came to Caesarea: and we entered into the house of Philip the evangelist, which was one of the seven; and stayed with him.

- "Philip the evangelist": a different title from "Philip the deacon", as he was previously known (Acts 6:5), showing that his work of 'superintending the distribution of alms' ("serving tables"; cf. Acts 6:2–3) had been 'merged' in the 'work of a missionary preacher'.

=== Verse 10 ===
And as we tarried there many days, there came down from Judaea a certain prophet, named Agabus.

- "Agabus": most likely the same prophet from Jerusalem who came to Antioch some years before, who was mentioned in Acts 11:28. Luke does not make any cross reference with the previous encounter and presents Agabus here "so indefinitely", because this was perhaps the first time that he had actually seen the prophet and recorded this meeting in the "we" section of the book.

=== Verse 13 ===
Then Paul answered, "What do you mean by weeping and breaking my heart? For I am ready not only to be bound, but also to die at Jerusalem for the name of the Lord Jesus."

Paul's response echoes Peter's words to Jesus, "Lord, I am ready to go with thee both into prison, and to death" (Luke 22:33 KJV).

== Arrival: Paul meets James (verses 17–26) ==
Once in Jerusalem Paul was welcomed warmly ("gladly") by the 'brothers' (verse 17), and the next day he and his company met with James and all the elders of the Jerusalem church (verse 18), during which 'Paul's detailed report on the success of his Gentile mission (verse 19) is greeted with enthusiasm' (verse 20). Luke points out that 'since the decisions of the Apostolic Council' (Acts 15:22–29), 'James and the Jerusalem leadership have no problem with the admission of Gentiles to the church' (verse 25).

=== Verse 18 ===
On the following day Paul went in with us to James, and all the elders were present.

- "James": here was James, known as "the brother of Jesus" and also as "James the Just". The murder of James, the son of Zebedee and brother of John the Apostle, had been reported in Acts 12:2, and this James, the new leader of 'the brethren', was referred to in Acts 12:17. Some commentators identify him with James the son of Alphaeus who had served as one of the twelve apostles (Matthew 10:3), for example Matthew Poole suggested that James was 'one of the apostles', but others disagree. The Cambridge Bible for Schools and Colleges states: "There was not any Apostle there or St Luke would hardly have failed to mention the fact, as he was one of those present" and William Robertson Nicoll, in the Expositor's Greek Testament, likewise argued that "Nothing is said of the Apostles". Hans Hinrich Wendt suggested that the presence of [some of] the apostles was encompassed within the reference to 'elders', but this view is contested by Nicoll.

== Paul in the Temple (verses 27–36) ==
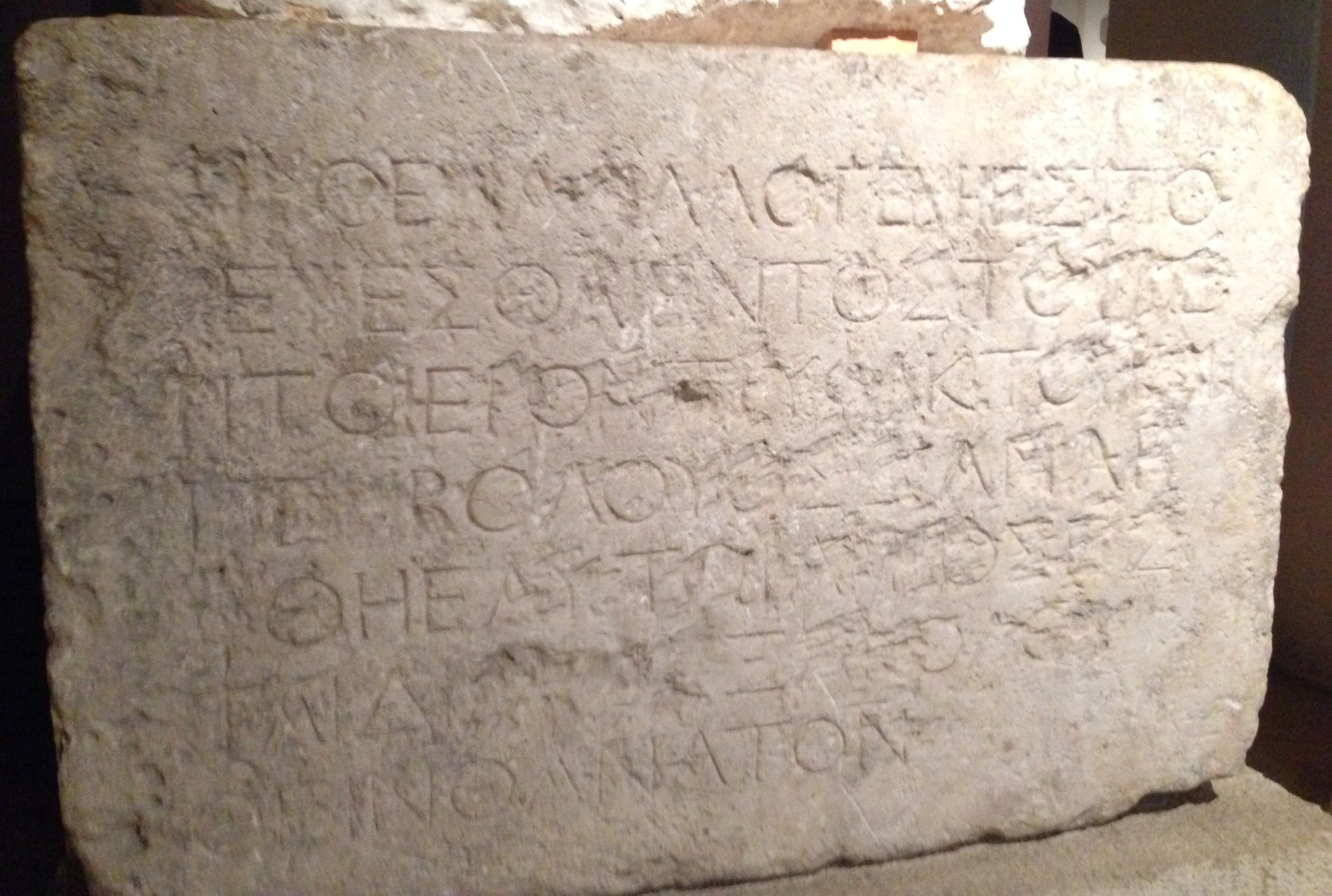
Jerusalem Temple Warning inscription from the Second Temple period (23 BCE-70 CE), stating in Greek language that no foreigner should go within the holy place of the Temple complex, which is related to Acts 21:28–29.

Paul follows James's advice which 'unwittingly precipitates the crisis James is trying to avoid'. Over the seven-day period of his purification in the temple (verse 27) Paul attracts the attention of some 'Jews from Asia', who presumably visit Jerusalem for the festival of Pentecost, from communities in dispute with Paul during his mission journeys. Other than perceiving Paul's teaching as 'a direct attack on the Jewish people, the law, and the temple', here they charge specifically that 'Paul has brought an uncircumcised Gentile into the holy place' (verse 28), which was a serious charge with the punishment of death (a Jewish religious law that in this respect is 'backed up by all the weight of Roman authority'), as shown in the inscriptions surviving from the temple precinct. Paul would have known this regulation perfectly well, and Luke makes it clear that Paul had not broken this regulation (verse 29), but 'the misapprehension is enough to arouse the whole city' (verse 30). Paul was in real danger of being lynched by the people (verses 31–32, 35–36), if he was not rescued in time by the commander of the Roman garrison from the Antonia fortress, which was built to overlook the temple and 'designed precisely to quell such religious riots' (cf. Josephus, Jewish War 5. 243–5).

=== Verses 27–29 ===
^{27}Now when the seven days were almost ended, the Jews from Asia, seeing him in the temple, stirred up the whole crowd and laid hands on him, ^{28}crying out, "Men of Israel, help! This is the man who teaches all men everywhere against the people, the law, and this place; and furthermore he also brought Greeks into the temple and has defiled this holy place." ^{29}(For they had previously seen Trophimus the Ephesian with him in the city, whom they supposed that Paul had brought into the temple.)

- "Trophimus": one of Paul's companions, is called Asianoi ("of Asia"), that is, natives of the Roman province of Asia in Acts 20:4 and also termed an "Ephesian" and a "Gentile/Greek" in Acts 21.

== Paul and the Tribune (verses 37–40) ==
This section 'overshadows the final scenes of Paul's career', where 'Paul has been shut out' (literally, verse 30) 'from the religious centre of his own people', and must end his life in the Roman world whose doors he opened for the gospel (Acts 16:37). The tribune suspected Paul be to the same figure as the Egyptian rebel leader who caused troubles around the same period of time, but 'Paul effectively undercuts the assumption by addressing the tribune in educated Greek' (verse 37) and claiming to be 'a citizen of no mean city' (verse 39), which 'is sufficient for the moment to establish common ground' for the tribune. However, Paul's Jewishness 'comes to fore' when he addressed the crowd again 'in the Hebrew language' (verse 40) almost certainly means "Aramaic", 'the spoken language of Palestine' at that time.

=== Verse 38 ===
[The commander says to Paul:] "Are you not the Egyptian who some time ago stirred up a rebellion and led the four thousand assassins out into the wilderness?"

- "The Egyptian": someone who claimed to be a prophet and led many followers into the desert when Felix was the procurator in Iudaea Province (52–60), as also recorded by Josephus in his Antiquities of the Jews 20:171-172 (also in Jewish War 2.2613).

=== Verse 39 ===
But Paul said, "I am a Jew from Tarsus, in Cilicia, a citizen of no mean city; and I implore you, permit me to speak to the people."

- "A citizen of no mean city": This statement about "Tarsus in Cilicia" is a legitimate one, as the city was much celebrated for its learning and famous for culture, at one time the rival of Alexandria and Athens, even it has on its coins the word "METROPOLIS-AUTONOMOS" (Independent). Josephus (Antiq., book 2, chapter 6, section 6) says that it was the metropolis, and most renowned city among [the Cilicians].

== See also ==
- Agabus
- Mnason of Cyprus
- Moses
- James, brother of Jesus
- Philip the Evangelist
- Trophimus of Ephesus
- Acts 7, Acts 15, Acts 16, Acts 17, Acts 18, Acts 19, Acts 20

== Sources ==
- Alexander, Loveday (2007). "62. Acts". In Barton, John; Muddiman, John (eds.). The Oxford Bible Commentary (first (paperback) ed.). Oxford University Press. pp. 1028–1061. ISBN 978-0199277186.
