= Acts 20 =

- ← chapter 19 chapter 21 →
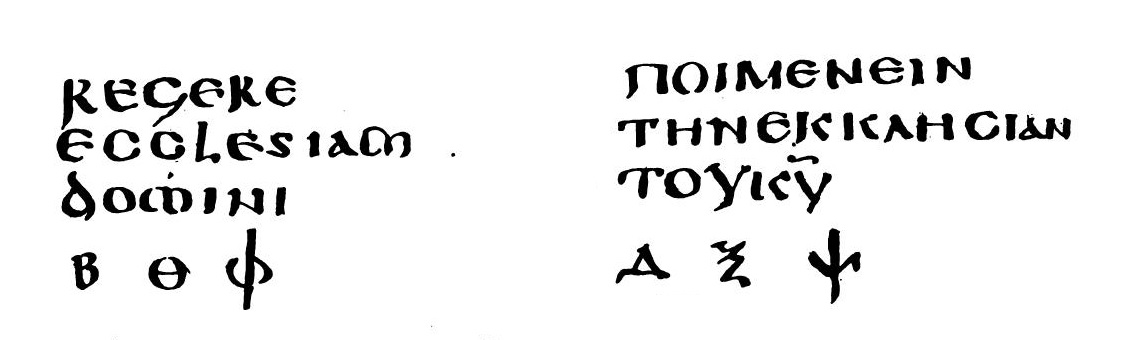
- Scrivener's facsimile (1874) of Acts 20:28 in Latin (left column) and Greek (right column) in Codex Laudianus, written about AD 550.
- Book: Acts of the Apostles
- Category: Church history
- Christian Bible part: New Testament
- Order in the Christian part: 5

Acts 20 is the twentieth chapter of the Acts of the Apostles in the Christian New Testament of the Bible. It records the third missionary journey of Paul the Apostle. The narrator and his companions ("we") play an active part in the developments in this chapter. Early Christian tradition uniformly affirmed that Luke the Evangelist composed this book as well as the Gospel of Luke. Critical opinion on the tradition was evenly divided at the end of the 20th century.

== Text ==
The original text was written in Koine Greek. This chapter is divided into 38 verses.

=== Textual witnesses ===
Some early manuscripts containing the text of this chapter are:

==== In Koine Greek ====
- Codex Vaticanus (AD 325–350)
- Codex Sinaiticus (330–360)
- Codex Bezae (~400)
- Codex Alexandrinus (400–440)
- Codex Ephraemi Rescriptus (~450; extant verses 11–38)
- Codex Laudianus (~550)

==== In Latin ====
- Codex Laudianus (~550)

== Locations ==
Places mentioned in (blue) and related to (black) this chapter.
Places mentioned in (blue) and related to (black) this chapter.

This chapter mentions the following places (in order of appearance):

- Macedonia
- Greece
- Syria
- Berea
- Asia (Roman province)
- Thessalonica
- Derbe
- Philippi
- Troas
- Assos
- Mitylene
- Chios
- Samos
- Trogyllium
- Miletus
- Ephesus
- Jerusalem

== Journey to Troas via Macedonia (verses 1–6) ==
This section records the beginning of the journey planned in Acts 19:21, as Paul was accompanied by brothers from almost all the mission areas: Sopater (cf. (probably) Romans 16:21), Tychicus (Colossians 4:7; Ephesians 6:21; 2 Timothy 4:12; Titus 3:12), Aristarchus and Gaius (Acts 19:29; cf. Romans 16:23, Colossians 4:10).

=== Verse 2 ===
Now when he had gone over that region and encouraged them with many words, he came to Greece.

"That region" (King James Version: "those parts"), would have included Philippi, Thessalonica and Beroea, and the churches Paul had established there. It may also have been at this time that Paul made the journey into Illyricum referred to in Romans 15:19.

=== Verse 4 ===
And there accompanied him into Asia Sopater of Berea; and of the Thessalonians, Aristarchus and Secundus; and Gaius of Derbe, and Timotheus; and of Asia, Tychicus and Trophimus.

- "Sopater" (Greek: Σώπατρος, Sṓpatros, meaning "saviour of his father" (Note: Easton's reads "The father who saves", whereas Holman's reads "sound parentage")) was the son of Pyrhus, a man from the city of Berea
- "Aristarchus": One of Paul's travel companions, a Macedonian from Thessalonica who is known from some references in the Acts of the Apostles (19:29; 20:4; 27:2) and Colossians 4:10.
- "Timotheus" or "Timothy" (NKJV).
- "Tychicus": traveled with Paul on his third missionary journey (Ephesians 6:21; Colossians 4:7; 1 Timothy 4:12; Titus 3:12).
- Tychicus and Trophimus are called ασιανοι (Asianoi, "of Asia"), that is, natives of the Roman province of Asia. Making it still more definite, Trophimus is also termed an "Ephesian" and a "Gentile/Greek" in Acts 21.

== In Troas (verses 7–12) ==
The believers in Troas (cf. 2 Corinthians 2:12–13) had a "meeting" on the first day of the week (verse 7; cf. Acts 2:42), which started on Saturday night (at that time, Sunday was a working day, so the practice was to gather on Saturday night or early on Sunday morning as noted by Pliny, Ep. 10.96.7), perhaps after work for some people, including Eutychus, which is a common slave name. It comprised a long teaching session by Paul (verse 7), 'breaking of bread' and a communal meal (verse 11), then finished at dawn.

=== Textual and Chronological Analysis ===
Linguistic analysis of the original Greek text highlights that the phrase translated as "the first day of the week" in verse 7 is τῇ μιᾷ τῶν σαββάτων (tē mia tōn sabbatōn), which literally translates as "on the one of the Sabbaths." With the context of verse 6—which timestamps the departure immediately "after the Days of Unleavened Bread"—Luke's phrasing serves as a chronological marker coinciding with the counting of the seven weekly Sabbaths during the Omer count from Passover to Shavuot/Pentecost. (Leviticus 23:15–16).

The Festival of Unleavened Bread concludes on the 21st day of the first month. Luke reports a precise sequence for the travel log beginning on the 22nd day of the first month, tracking a 5-day journey from Philippi that concludes on the 26th day, followed by a fixed 7-day stay in Troas beginning on the 27th day. This 12-day timeline crosses a new month transition, making Paul's stay in Troas end exactly 13 days after the unleavened bread festival concluded, landing this farewell gathering on a mid-week evening (calculated as a Tuesday). Luke's record of this event as "on one of the sabbaths" was during the week of the 3rd Omer Sabbath counting towards Shavuot/Pentecost. The text notes that the believers gathered to break bread in the evening, and Paul, intending to depart the next day, preached until midnight. Luke records this as merely a farewell event alongside the fall and revival of Eutychus, rather than a proof text for the institutional Sunday or traditional "Lord's day" celebration claim. Luke provides enough information for this "mia ton sabbaton" all night assembly to be a specific 3rd Omer week meeting prior to Paul's 19-mile journey on foot at daybreak.

=== Verse 9 ===
And in a window sat a certain young man named Eutychus, who was sinking into a deep sleep. He was overcome by sleep; and as Paul continued speaking, he fell down from the third story and was taken up dead.

Eutychus was a young man of (Alexandria) Troas tended to by St. Paul. The name Eutychus means "fortunate". Eutychus fell asleep due to the long nature of the discourse Paul was giving and fell from his seat out of a three-story window. Paul's immediate action to resurrect Eutychus (verse 10) recalls the miracles of Elijah and Elisha (1 Kings 17:21–22; 2 Kings 4:34–35). The term "dead" (Greek: nekros) is used to emphasize that this is to be seen as a real miracle (verse 10).

- "Third story": this indicates a 'working-class insula or apartment block', not the atrium of a villa or town house.

=== Verse 10 ===
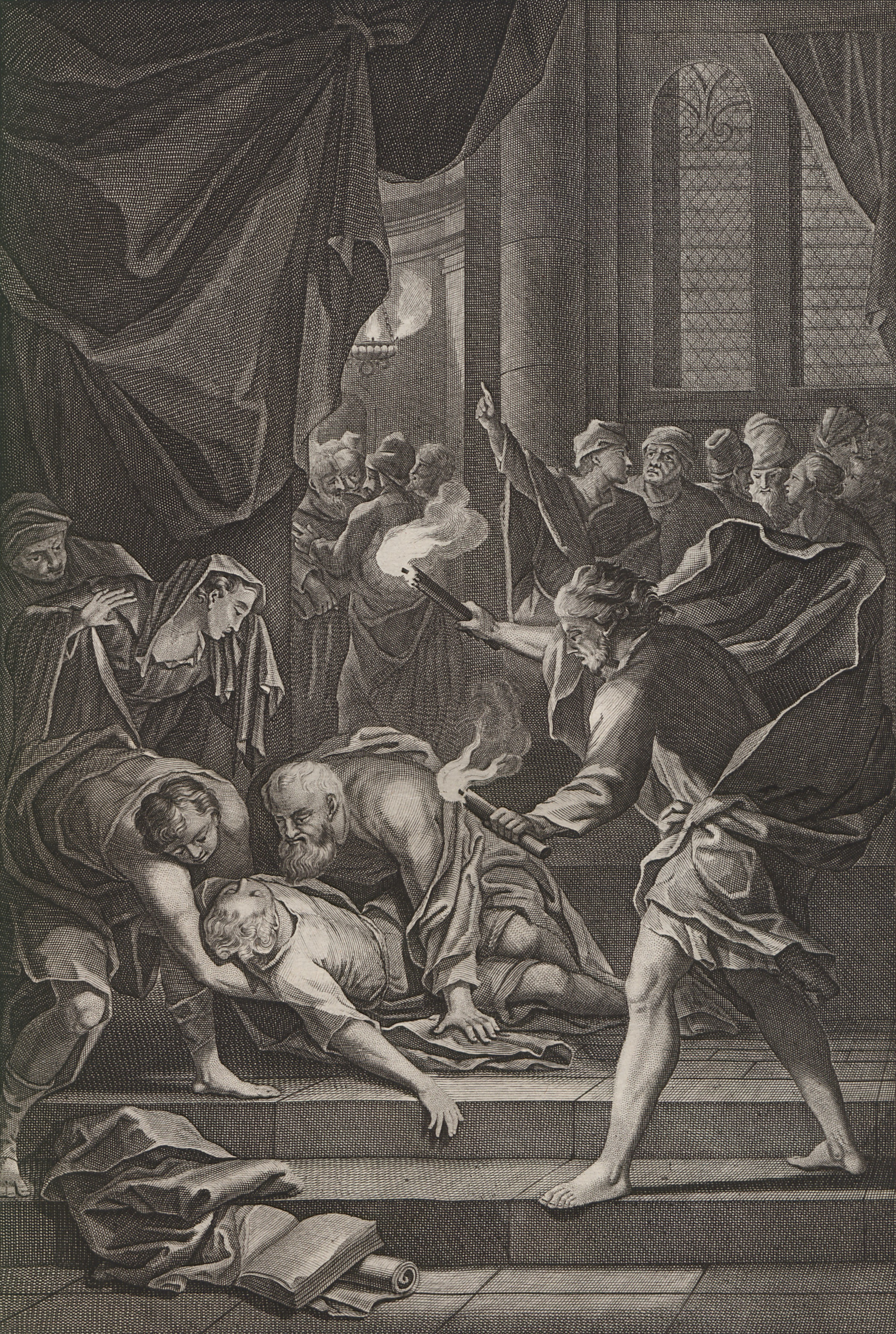
Paul raiseth Eutychus to life, from Figures de la Bible, 1728.

But Paul went down, fell on him, and embracing him said, "Do not trouble yourselves, for his life is in him."

After Eutychus fell down to his death, Paul then picked him up, insisting that he was not dead, and carried him back upstairs; those gathered then had a meal and a long conversation which lasted until dawn. After Paul left, Eutychus was found to be alive. It is unclear whether the story intends to relate that Eutychus was killed by the fall and Paul raised him, or whether he simply seemed to be dead, with Paul ensuring that he is still alive.

=== Verse 12 ===
And they brought the young man in alive, and they were not a little comforted.

== Journey from Troas to Miletus (verses 13–17) ==
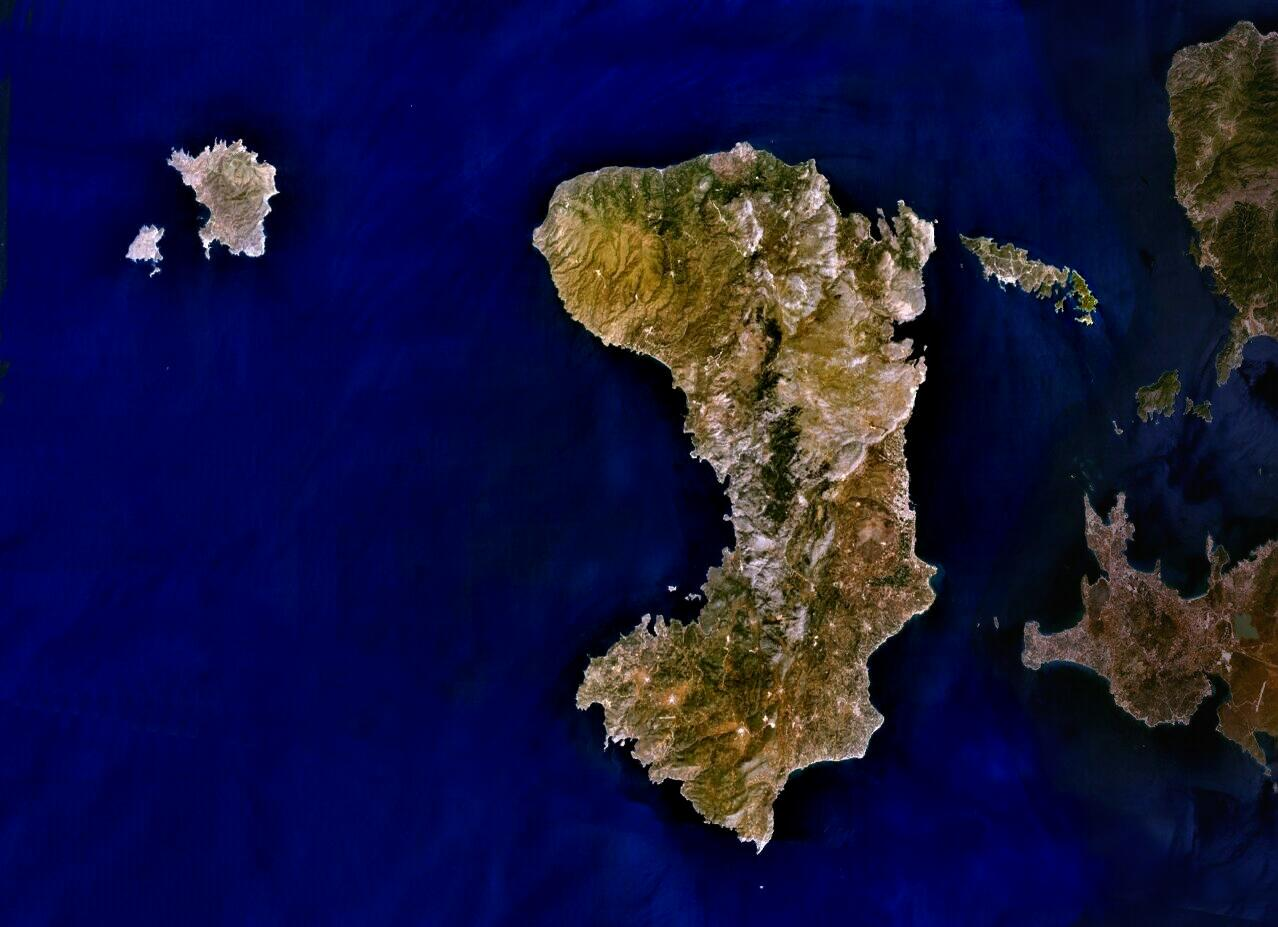
Satellite view of Chios island (NASA)

Satellite 3D view of Samos island (NASA)

Paul's journey through the northern Aegean Sea is detailed in verses 13 to 16. The text states that Paul, having left Philippi after the Days of Unleavened Bread, had a desire urgently to travel to Jerusalem and needed to be there by the Day of Pentecost, even choosing to avoid returning to Ephesus and being delayed there. As there are fifty days from the Feast of Unleavened Bread (Passover) to Pentecost, and five days were taken on travel from Philippi to Troas and seven days spent waiting in Troas, Paul and his party had around 38 days available for travel to Jerusalem.

Paul appears to have made the arrangements to charter a ship, but Luke and his companions began the journey from Troas and sailed around Cape Baba to Assos. Paul travelled overland from Troas to Assos and embarked there. The ship sailed southwards to Lesbos, calling at Mitylene, then passed Chios and arrived at Samos, staying at Trogyllium. They passed Ephesus and came into port at Miletus, calling for the elders of the church in Ephesus to travel to Miletus for a meeting. The elders of the church (Greek: τους πρεσβυτερους της εκκλησιας, tous presbyterous tes ekklesias) were also referred to as overseers (Greek: επισκοπους, episkopous) in verse 28.

Miletus is about 40 miles south of Ephesus. The Jamieson-Fausset-Brown Bible Commentary noted that in view of Paul's haste, more time might have been lost in calling for the elders to come from Ephesus than would have been lost if Paul had actually gone to Ephesus himself, but surmised that either his decision was made because of 'unfavorable winds and stormy weather [which] had overtaken them' or 'he was unwilling to run the risk of detention at Ephesus by the state of the church and other causes'.

== Paul's speech to the Ephesian elders (verses 18–38) ==
This section records the only direct speech of Paul to Christian believers in the book of Acts, thus the only passage which strictly parallels the epistles (cf. Philippians 3; 2 Timothy 3–4; Romans 15, and the autobiographical sections in 2 Corinthians 10-12.

=== Verse 24 ===
[Paul said:] "But none of these things move me; nor do I count my life dear to myself, so that I may finish my race with joy, and the ministry which I received from the Lord Jesus, to testify to the gospel of the grace of God."

=== Verse 28 ===
[Paul said:] “Take heed therefore unto yourselves, and to all the flock, over the which the Holy Ghost hath made you overseers, to feed the church of God, which he hath purchased with his own blood.”

- "Take heed...unto yourselves": translated from the Greek phrase προσέχετε ἑαυτοῖς, prosechete heautois), which is peculiar to Luke's writings (Luke 12:1; Luke 17:3; Luke 21:34). Compare to 1 Timothy 3:2–7; 4:16; 6:11.
- "Overseers": translated from the Greek word ἐπισκόπους, episkopous, which is usually also rendered as "bishops". Both "elders" and "bishops" have been originally and apostolically synonymous, that the distinction between these offices cannot be certainly traced until the second century, nor was it established until late in that century.
- "To feed": translated from the Greek word ποιμαίνειν, poimainein; the proper word for "tending" in relation to τὸ ποίμνιον (to poimnion), "the flock", as ποιμήν (poimen), the "pastor", or "shepherd". A 'pastor' is 'to feed the flock' (of Christ cf. John 10:11, 16; John 21:17; Hebrews 13:20; 1 Peter 5:2, 3). Peter applies the titles of "Shepherd and Bishop of souls" to the Lord Jesus (1 Peter 2:25). Paul does not use the metaphor elsewhere, except indirectly, and in a different aspect (1 Corinthians 9:7).
- "Which he hath purchased": translated from the Greek phrase ἣν περιεποιήσατο, hēn periepoiēsato, "which He has acquired" for His possession (Ephesians 1:14; Titus 2:14; 1 Peter 2:9) by His own blood (cf. 1 Corinthians 6:20; 1 Corinthians 7:23; 1 Peter 1:7; 1 Peter 1:19.
- "Church of God": translated from the Greek phrase ἐκκλησίαν τοῦ θεοῦ, ekklēsian tou Theou. Textus Receptus has τοῦ Θεοῦ, tou Theou, whereas many uncials have τοῦ Κυρίου, "of [the] Lord" but the phrase ἐκκλησία τοῦ Κυρίου occurs nowhere else in Paul's writings, while the phrase ἐκκλησία τοῦ Θεοῦ occurs ten times in Pauline epistles. Both the Codex Vaticanus (B; 03) and the Codex Sinaiticus (א; 01), regarded as two oldest manuscripts, have Θεοῦ (Θυ), as well as the Latin Vulgate and the Syriac versions. The early Church Fathers Ignatius (in his Epistle to the Ephesians) and Tertullian use the phrase, "the blood of God," which seems to have been derived from this passage.

This verse was engraved on a papal tiara which Napoleon gave to Pope Pius VII.

=== Verse 35 ===
[Paul said:] "I have shown you in every way, by laboring like this, that you must support the weak. And remember the words of the Lord Jesus, that He said, 'It is more blessed to give than to receive.'"

This verse is unusual in that it records a saying of Jesus that did not come to be recorded in any of the gospels. In his homily on the Acts of the Apostles, John Chrysostom says,

And where said He this? Perhaps the Apostles delivered it by unwritten tradition; or else it is plain from (recorded sayings, from) which one could infer it."

A similar saying is also found in the deuterocanonical book of Tobit (Tobit 12:8).

== See also ==
- Aristarchus of Thessalonica
- Days of Unleavened Bread
- Eutychus
- Gaius of Derbe
- Napoleon Tiara
- Paul the Apostle
- Pentecost
- Sopater of Berea
- Timothy
- Trophimus
- Tychicus

== Sources ==
- Alexander, Loveday (2007). "62. Acts". In Barton, John; Muddiman, John (eds.). The Oxford Bible Commentary (first (paperback) ed.). Oxford University Press. pp. 1028–1061. ISBN 978-0199277186.
- Coogan, Michael David (2007). Coogan, Michael David; Brettler, Marc Zvi; Newsom, Carol Ann; Perkins, Pheme (eds.). The New Oxford Annotated Bible with the Apocryphal/Deuterocanonical Books: New Revised Standard Version, Issue 48 (Augmented 3rd ed.). Oxford University Press. ISBN 9780195288810.
