= Lucius Junius Gallio Annaeanus =

Roman senator (c. 5 BC-c. 65 AD)

Suffect consul of the Roman Empire
- In office c. 51 AD – c. 52 AD Serving with Titus Cutius Ciltus
- Preceded by: Quintus Volusius Saturninu; Publius Cornelius Scipio
- Succeeded by: Publius Sulpicius Scribonius Rufus; Publius Sulpicius Scribonius Proculus

Personal details
- Born: Lucius Annaeus Novatus c. 5 BC Corduba, Hispania Baetica, Roman Empire
- Died: c. 65 AD (aged c. 69) Rome, Italy, Roman Empire

Lucius Junius Gallio Annaeanus (Greek: Γαλλιων, Galliōn; c. 5 BC – c. AD 65) was a Roman senator and brother of the writer Seneca. He is best known for dismissing an accusation brought against Paul the Apostle in Corinth.

== Life ==
Gallio (originally named Lucius Annaeus Novatus), the son of the rhetorician Seneca the Elder and the elder brother of Seneca the Younger, was born in Corduba (Cordova) c. 5 BC. He was adopted by Lucius Junius Gallio, a rhetorician of some repute, from whom he took the name of Junius Gallio. His brother Seneca, who dedicated to him the treatises De Ira and De Vita Beata, speaks of the charm of his disposition, also alluded to by the poet Statius (Silvae, ii.7, 32). It is probable that he was banished to Corsica with his brother, and that they returned together to Rome when Agrippina selected Seneca to be tutor to Nero. Towards the close of the reign of Claudius, Gallio was proconsul of the newly constituted senatorial province of Achaea, but seems to have been compelled by ill-health to resign the post within a few years. He was referred to by Claudius as "my friend and proconsul" in the Delphi Inscription, around 52.

Gallio was a suffect or replacement consul in the mid-50s, and Cassius Dio records that he introduced Nero's performances. Not long after the death of his brother, Seneca, Gallio (according to Tacitus, Ann. 15.73) was attacked in the Senate by Salienus Clemens, who accused him of being a "parricide and public enemy", though the Senate unanimously appealed to Salienus not to profit "from public misfortunes to satisfy a private animosity". He did not survive this reprieve long. When his second brother, Annaeus Mela, opened his veins after being accused of involvement in a conspiracy (Tacitus, Ann. 16.17), Gallio seems to have committed suicide, perhaps under instruction in 65 AD.

=== Gallio and Paul the Apostle ===
According to the Acts of the Apostles, when Gallio was proconsul of Achaea, Paul the Apostle was brought in front of him by the Jews of Corinth with the accusation of having violated Mosaic Law. This action was presumably headed by Sosthenes, a ruler of the local synagogue. Gallio, however, was indifferent towards religious disputes between the Jews and the Christians, so he refused to pass any judgment and had Paul and the Jews removed from the Court. Soon after that, Sosthenes was beaten by a mob, but Gallio did not intervene (Acts 18:12-17).

Gallio's tenure can be fairly accurately dated to between AD 51–52. Therefore, the events of Acts 18 can be dated to this period. This is significant because it is the most accurately known date in the life of Paul.

== See also ==
- Junia (gens)
- List of biblical figures identified in extra-biblical sources
- Delphi Inscription

== Resources ==
- Ancient sources: Tacitus, Annals, xv.73; Dio Cassius, lx.35, lxii.25.
- Bruce Winter, "Rehabilitating Gallio and his Judgement in Acts 18:14-15", Tyndale Bulletin 57.2 (2006) 291–308.
- Sir W. M. Ramsay, St Paul the Traveller, pp. 257–261
- Cowan, H. (1899). "Gallio". In James Hastings (ed.). A Dictionary of the Bible. Vol. II. pp. 105–106.
- A reconstruction is given by Anatole France in Sur la pierre blanche.
- F. L. Lucas's story "The Hydra (A.D. 53)" in The Woman Clothed with the Sun, and other stories (Cassell, London, 1937; Simon & Schuster, N.Y., 1938) focuses on Gallio at the time of Paul's trial. "A Greek trader, a chance acquaintance of Judas Iscariot, comes to tell the Roman Governor of Corinth 'the real truth about this religious quarrel among the Jews', but is dissuaded by the tolerant old man from taking risks for Truth" (Time and Tide, August 14, 1937).
- Rudyard Kipling's Gallio's Song

Political offices
Preceded by Quintus Volusius Saturninus; Publius Cornelius Scipio	Roman consul 56 (suffect) with Titus Cutius Ciltus	Succeeded by P. Sulpicius Scribonius Rufus; P. Sulpicius Scribonius Proculus as suffect consuls
