= Eutychus =

Youth tended to by St Paul in the Book of Acts

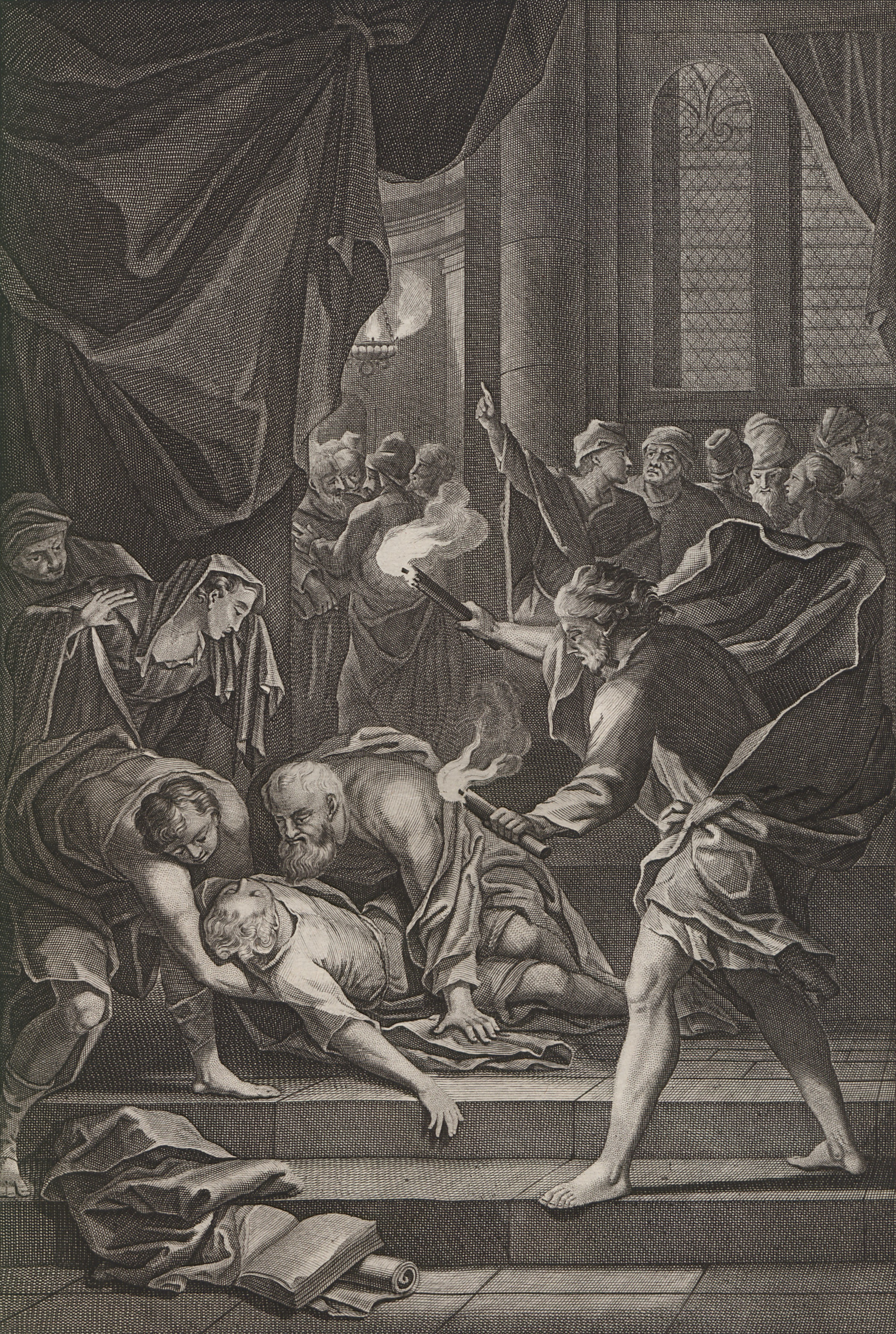
Paul raiseth Eutychus to life, from Figures de la Bible, 1728

Eutychus /ˈjuːtɪkəs/ (Greek: Εὔτυχος) was a young man (or a youth) of Troas tended to by St. Paul. Eutychus fell asleep due to the long nature of the discourse Paul was giving, fell from a window out of the three-storey building, and died. Paul then embraced him, insisting that he was not dead, and having been resurrected by Paul, they carried him back upstairs alive; those gathered then had a meal and a long talk which lasted until dawn. This is related in the New Testament book of the Acts of the Apostles 20:7–12.

Though some (e.g. William Barclay, F. F. Bruce), do not believe that Eutychus died, Wayne Jackson observes the following facts: 1) the author Luke, a physician (Col. 4:14), plainly states that Eutychus was "taken up dead" (Greek: ἤρθη νεκρός, erthe nekros); 2) after Paul embraces Eutychus, he says, "Trouble not yourselves, for his life is in him" (Greek: ἡ γὰρ ψυχὴ αὐτοῦ ἐν αὐτῷ ἐστιν, he gar psuche autou en auto estin), not "still in him" as the Weymouth translation erroneously interprets; 3) Eutychus was then "brought alive" by which the others were "not a little comforted", which words would make no sense if Eutychus had not died; and 4) Luke was fully capable of describing someone as only being "supposedly dead" (Greek: νομίσαντες γὰρ αὐτὸν τεθνάναι), as he did of Paul in Acts 14:19, but he did not do so here. However, Eutychus' complete recovery from a three-storey fall, regardless of the initial result, and Paul's attendance at the scene of the accident, appears to be the impact of the narrative.

The name Eutychus means "fortunate" in Greek, and the author of Acts appears to be using the name significantly to unite the character of Eutychus “Fortunate” with the larger narrative context about the “fortunate” outcome of the story. Eutychus is “fortunate” that despite his bad judgment and carelessness, and its initial unfortunate results, Paul the miracle worker is present to revive him. In other words, the name Eutychus in this passage is a classic example of the literary device nomen est omen.

One researcher compares this memorable accident that happened to Eutychus with the myth of Elpenor in the Odyssey.
