= Mnason =

Biblical figure in Acts

Mnason (Greek: μνασωνι τινι κυπριω) was a first-century Cypriot Christian, who is mentioned in chapter 21 of the Acts of the Apostles as offering hospitality to Luke the evangelist, Paul the apostle and their companions, when they travelled from Caesarea to Jerusalem. The wording of the verse that mentions Mnason (Acts 21:16) has prompted debates about whether Mnason accompanied the travellers on their journey or merely provided lodging, and whether his house was in Jerusalem or in a village on the way to Jerusalem. Although only mentioned in one verse, many Christians have drawn lessons from the example of Mnason about persevering in the Christian faith and the exercise of hospitality.

== Biblical references ==
In Acts 21:16, Mnason is recorded as providing lodging to Paul and "certain of the disciples of Caesarea" (KJV), when they were travelling with a collection for the church in Jerusalem at the end of Paul's third missionary journey in AD 57. The location of Mnason's house is not explicitly mentioned on the text, and may have been either in Jerusalem or in a village en route to the city (the journey itself was between 60 and 70 miles, so would have taken at least two days).

== Interpretation ==
=== Background ===
No other contemporary sources contain biographical details on Mnason, so very little is known of him. He was a Hellenistic Jew from Cyprus, like the apostle Barnabas. His name means "remembering" and was a common Greek name at the time. It appears in the Corpus Inscriptionum Graecarum as a personal name around 30 times. The name is a variant of "Jason", and in the Codex Sinaiticus, his name is written as "Jason". F. F. Bruce has raised the alternative possibility, that his name is a Hellenized form of the Hebrew name "Manasseh", but concludes that it is more likely to just be a Greek name.

Mnason is described as an "old" or "early disciple" (Greek: ἀρχαίῳ μαθητῇ), although exactly how long he had been a believer is not mentioned in the text, and is the subject of some discussion. J. J. Hughes has suggested he had been a believer since the descent of the Holy Spirit at Pentecost, as described in Acts 2:1–31, and consequently a founding member of the church at Jerusalem. It has also been proposed that he might have been one of the unnamed seventy disciples sent out by Jesus in Luke's gospel, and he is named as one of them in the 13th-century Book of the Bee. It is also possible that he was converted under the ministry of Barnabas and Paul when they travelled to Cyprus, as recorded in Acts 13.

Friedrich Blass and George Salmon have suggested a further possibility, based on the text of the fifth-century Codex Bezae, which explicitly locates Mnason in a village on the way to Jerusalem rather than in the city itself. In Acts 11:2, the Codex contains another variant reading, which records the apostle Peter preaching in the districts between Caesarea and Jerusalem. Salmon concludes, "It is a natural combination to infer that Mnason was one of his converts".

As an "early" disciple, it is possible that Luke, who accompanied Paul on the journey from Caesarea to Jerusalem and wrote the narrative, may have questioned Mnason to gather historical source material on the early church, to assist with the writing of Acts. This would explain the mention of him by name, despite his apparently minor role in the narrative. More specifically, W. M. Ramsay has suggested that Mnason was Luke's source for the healings of Aeneas and Dorcas recorded in Acts 9.

The fact that Mnason owned a house that was able to accommodate all of Paul's companions is a likely indicator of his wealth.

=== Service to Paul ===
The main scholarly debate around the figure of Mnason has concerned the location of his house. The location is not recorded in most manuscripts, although the idea of Mnason living outside of Jerusalem finds explicit support in the fifth-century Codex Bezae, which describes Mnason as a wealthy landowner living between Jerusalem and Caesarea, and also a marginal note in the Syriac Vulgate. Scholars supporting this view include George Salmon, Friedrich Blass, and Ajith Fernando, in his volume in the NIV Application Commentary series. Salmon finds it unusual that Paul would rely on a stranger for lodging in Jerusalem, when he would have had many friends in the city, including the believers who are recorded as welcoming him "gladly" in Acts 21:17.

Other New Testament scholars have seen this view as being very unlikely, including F. F. Bruce, Richard C. H. Lenski and I. Howard Marshall. Lenski has argued that this interpretation is contrary to the flow of the text, stating: "The point of the narrative is never where the travelers stopped for the night...but where Paul's party lodged in Jerusalem". Marshall has commented that it would be unusual for Luke to just name Paul's host for an overnight stay rather than his host in Jerusalem.

Ambiguity in the text recording the hospitality shown by Mnason to Paul has also led to debate about whether Mnason travelled with Paul and his companions from Caesarea before offering them lodging at his home. Translations such as the Authorised Version, Revised Version and New English Bible read that the disciples brought Mnason with them, whereas the Revised Standard Version, New International Version and the Jerusalem Bible record the disciples bringing Paul to Mnason. The latter interpretation is generally favoured by modern commentators; J. J. Hughes concludes: "While either understanding is possible from the difficult syntax of this passage, the latter is probably correct since it is difficult to understand why the disciples would bring the prospective host".

Christian writers such as Matthew Henry, Frederick Hastings and Alexander Maclaren have pointed to Mnason as an example of persevering in the Christian faith, emphasising his willingness to provide hospitality even after many years of being a Christian. Maclaren writes, "How beautiful it is to see a man...holding firmly by the Lord whom he has loved and served all his days". In John Bunyan's classic allegorical work The Pilgrim's Progress, the pilgrims stay in the house of a Mr. Mnason, who is named after the Biblical figure.
