= Gaius (biblical figure) =

Gaius is the Greek spelling for the male Roman name Caius, a figure in the New Testament of the Bible.

1. A Christian, Gaius is mentioned in Macedonia as a traveling companion of Paul, along with Aristarchus (Acts 19:29).
2. One chapter later, Gaius who has a residence in Derbe is named as one of Paul's seven traveling companions who waited for him at Troas (Acts 20:4).
3. Gaius is mentioned as having a residence in Corinth as being one of only a few people there (the others being Crispus and the household of Stephanas) who were baptised by Paul, who founded the Church in that city (1 Corinthians 1:14).
4. Gaius is referred to in a final greeting portion of the Epistle to the Romans (Romans 16:23) as Paul's "host" and also host of the whole church, in whatever city Paul is writing from at the time. In all likelihood, this was Corinth. This Gaius is traditionally taken to be Bishop of Ephesus.
5. Lastly, Gaius to whom the third Epistle of John is addressed (3 John 1). He may be Gaius mentioned in any of the other contexts. He is sometimes also taken traditionally to be Bishop of Ephesus.
