= Trogyllium =

Trogyllium, Strogyllium or Stogyllium was a mainland coastal location in modern Turkey, near to the Greek island of Samos. It is mentioned in some versions of Acts 20:15, as a place where Luke the Evangelist, Paul the Apostle and their companions stayed during their southbound maritime journey from Assos to Rhodes. The King James Version and the Geneva Bible mention this stop-over point: 'the next day we arrived at Samos, and tarried at Trogyllium' but the American Standard Version, the New International Version and the Good News Translation do not include this phrase, following the Alexandrian texts which omit the line. There are also variant readings in the classical Greek versions of the New Testament.

According to Ptolemy, Trogyllium was a promontory in the Icarian Sea, and according to Strabo it was about forty furlongs distant from Samos. It was a promontory of Mycale mountain; and theologian John Gill reports that Trogilias, called also Trogilia, is mentioned with Mycale and Samos by Pliny, as being near to Miletus.
