= Delphi Inscription =

Collection of letter fragments written by Claudius

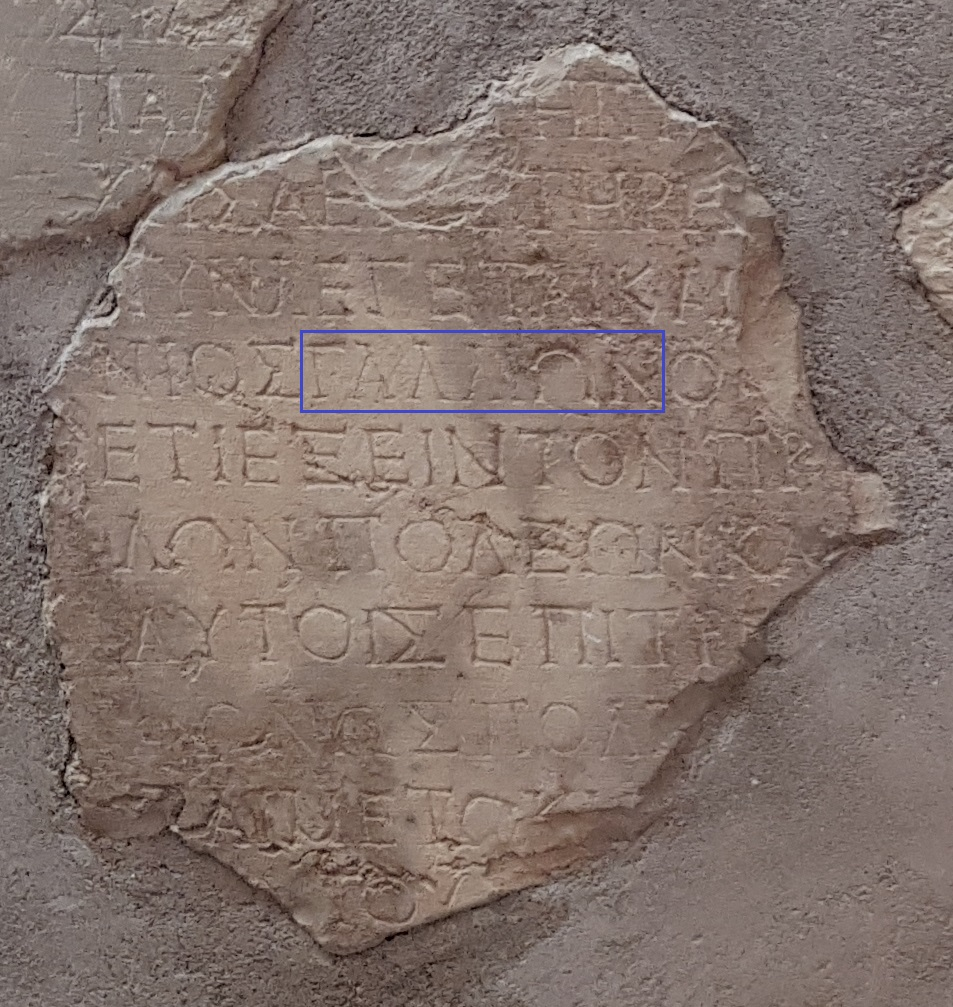
Delphi museum - Fragment with the name ΓΑΛΛίΩΝ

The Delphi Inscription, or Gallio Inscription (Fouilles de Delphes III 4:286; SIG, II, 801d), is the name given to the collection of nine fragments of a letter written by the Roman emperor Claudius in 52 CE which was discovered early in the 20th century at the Temple of Apollo in Delphi, Greece.

== Text ==
The reconstructed inscription begins thus:

Tiber[ius Claudius Cae]sar Augustus Ge[rmanicus, invested with tribunician po]wer [for the 12th time, acclaimed Imperator for t]he 26th time, F[ather of the Fa]ther[land...]. For a l[ong time have I been not onl]y [well-disposed towards t]he ci[ty] of Delph[i, but also solicitous for its pro]sperity, and I have always guard[ed th]e cul[t of t]he [Pythian] Apol[lo. But] now [since] it is said to be desti[tu]te of [citi]zens, as [L. Jun]ius Gallio, my fri[end] an[d procon]sul, [recently reported to me, and being desirous that Delphi] should retain [inta]ct its for[mer rank, I] ord[er you (pl.) to in]vite well-born people also from [ot]her cities [to Delphi as new inhabitants....]

The reference to proconsul Gallio in the inscription provides an important marker for developing a chronology of the life of Apostle Paul, since he presides over the trial of Paul in Achaea mentioned in the Acts of the Apostles (Acts 18:12-17).

== See also ==
- Chronology of Jesus

== Bibliography ==
- Plassatt, Andre (1970). Fouilles de Delphes, III. Épigraphie: Fasc. 4, Inscriptions de la terrasse du temple et la région nord du sanctuaire, vol. 3. Paris. pp. 26–32, no. 286.
- Novak, Ralph Martin (2001). Christianity and the Roman Empire: Background Texts. Continuum International Publishing Group. pp. 20–22. ISBN 978-1-56338-347-2.
- Murphy-O'Connor, Jerome (2002). St. Paul's Corinth: Text and Archaeology. Liturgical Press. pp. 161–169. ISBN 978-0-8146-5303-6.
- Köstenberger; Andreas J.; L. Scott Kellum & Charles Quarles (2009). The Cradle, the Cross, and the Crown: An Introduction to the New Testament. B&H Publishing Group. p. 400. ISBN 978-0-8054-4365-3.
