= Rainer Riesner =

German theologian

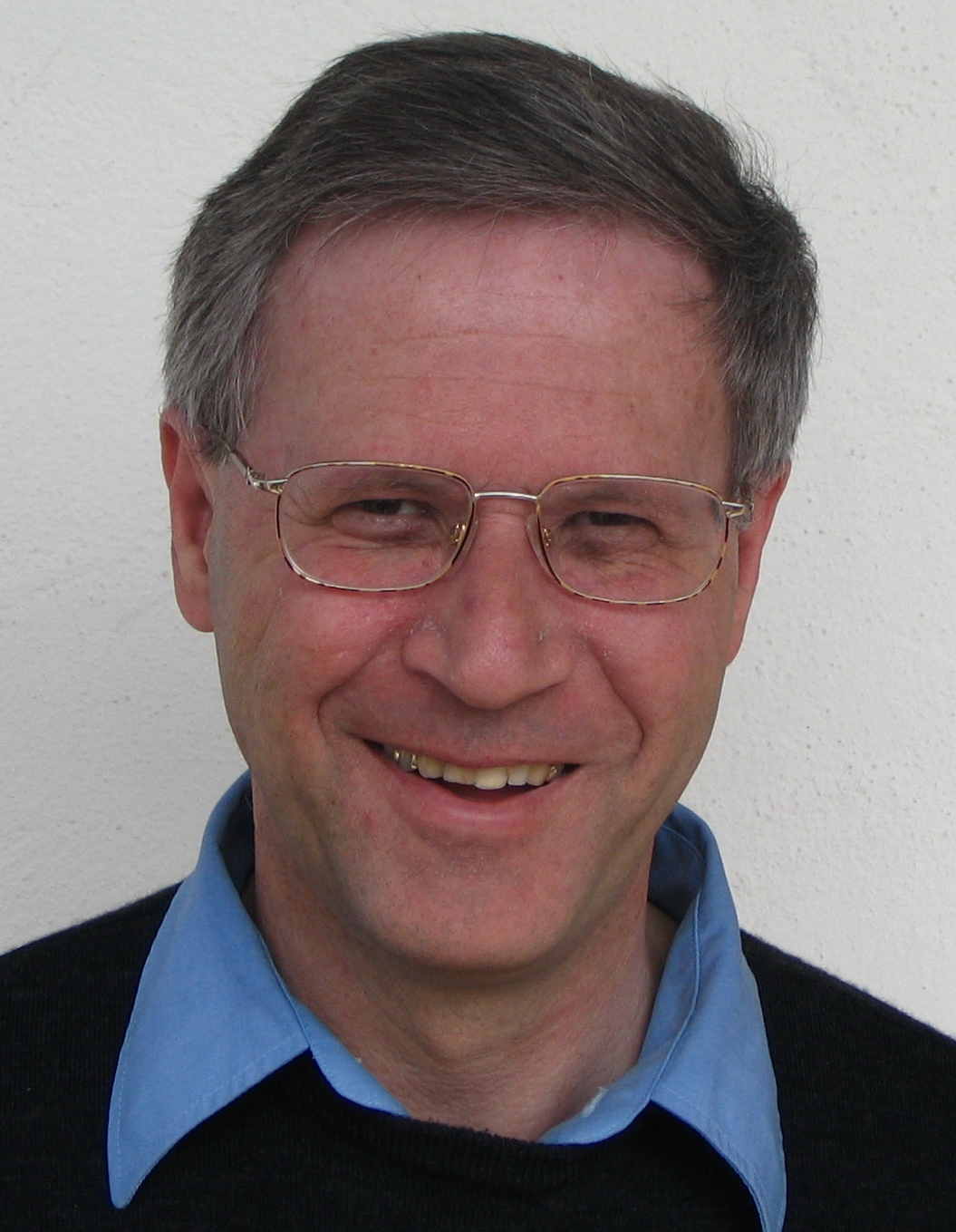
- Born: June 2, 1950 (age 76); Friedberg
- Occupations: German theologian & pastor
- Spouse: Cornelia Riesner
- Children: Four

Academic work
- Institutions: TU Dortmund University
- Notable works: Jesus als Lehrer, Die Frühzeit des Apostels Paulus

Rainer Riesner (born 2 June 1950 in Friedberg) is a German pastor and theologian. He was ordained pastor in 1980, he has taught theology since 1998, with a focus on the New Testament, at TU Dortmund University. Since 1986 he has been married to Cornelia Riesner, a medical doctor. They have four children.

Riesner's studies on the New Testament have been groundbreaking in multiple areas. His doctoral dissertation was a comparison of Jesus's teaching methods with other contemporary methods. It gave special attention to the amount of memorization required of young boys in the home and the synagogue school. His comprehensive study of ancient Jewish and Christian sources led him to the conclusion that Jesus's followers had the capacity to memorize his teachings almost verbatim and to reliably pass them on in the early Christian gospels. This work was later published under the title Jesus als Lehrer ("Jesus as Teacher"). Riesner has continued to research and write extensively about the origin of the gospels and their value as historical sources.

Riesner's second major contribution was his study of the chronology of the apostle Paul's early work after his conversion to Christianity. This work was published as Die Frühzeit des Apostels Paulus (English translation Paul's Early Period). In addition to many original insights, this book is one of the most comprehensive surveys of scholarly opinions about the chronology of Paul's work and the spread of early Christianity.

Prof Riesner's writings cover many other topics including the geography and archaeology of ancient Palestine, the Essene community (by whom the Dead Sea Scrolls were perhaps written), and the crossroads of Protestant and Roman Catholic belief.

== Works ==
- Riesner, Rainer (1978). Apostolischer Gemeindebau: die Herausforderung der paulinischen Gemeinden. Glauben und Denken. Vol. 932. Giessen: Brunnen Verlag. ISBN 9783765529320. OCLC 5783900.
- ——— (1981). Jesus als Lehrer: eine Untersuchung zum Ursprung der Evangelien-Überlieferung (in trans. Jesus as Teacher). Wissenschaftliche Untersuchungen zum Neuen Testament, 2. Reihe, 7. Tübingen: Mohr. ISBN 9783161444692. OCLC 9131804. PDF.
- ——— (1994). Die Frühzeit des Apostels Paulus : Studien zur Chronologie, Missionsstrategie und Theologie (in trans. Paul's Early Period: chronology, mission strategy, theology). Wissenschaftliche Untersuchungen zum Neuen Testament. Vol. 71. Tübingen: Mohr. ISBN 9783161458286. OCLC 30100296.
- ———; Betz, Otto (1994). Jesus, Qumran, and the Vatican : clarifications. New York: Crossroad. ISBN 9780824513979. OCLC 29024420.
- ——— (2002). Bethanien jenseits des Jordan: Topographie und Theologie im Johannes-Evangelium. Studien zur biblischen Archäologie und Zeitgeschichte. Vol. 12. Giessen: Brunnen. ISBN 9783765598128. OCLC 52489981.
- ———; Fleckenstein, Karl-Heinz; Louhivuori, Mikko (2003). Emmaus in Judäa: Geschichte, Exegese, Archäologie. Studien zur biblischen Archäologie und Zeitgeschichte. Vol. 11. Giessen: Brunnen. ISBN 9783765598111. OCLC 54425307.
