= Acts 18 =

- ← chapter 17 chapter 19 →
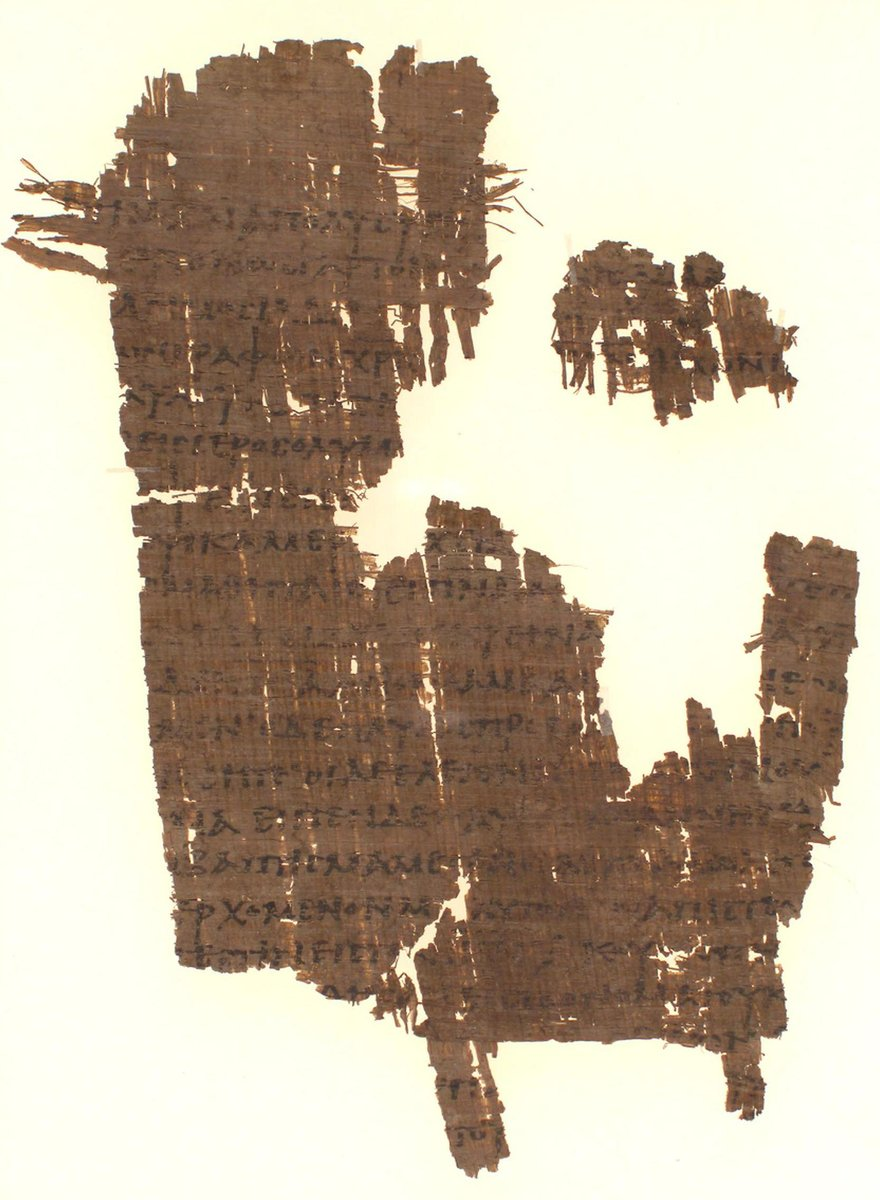
- Acts 18:27–19:6 on recto side in Papyrus 38, written about AD 250.
- Book: Acts of the Apostles
- Category: Church history
- Christian Bible part: New Testament
- Order in the Christian part: 5

Acts 18 is the eighteenth chapter of the Acts of the Apostles in the New Testament of the Christian Bible. It records the final part of the second missionary journey of Paul, together with Silas and Timothy, and the beginning of the third missionary journey. Early Christian tradition uniformly affirmed that Luke composed this book as well as the Gospel of Luke. Critical opinion on the tradition was evenly divided at the end of the 20th century.

== Text ==
The original text was written in Koine Greek. This chapter is divided into 28 verses.

=== Textual witnesses ===
Some early manuscripts containing the text of this chapter are:

- Papyrus 38 (c. AD 250)
- Codex Vaticanus (325–350)
- Codex Sinaiticus (330–360)
- Codex Bezae (c. 400)
- Codex Alexandrinus (400–440)
- Codex Laudianus (c. 550)

== Locations ==
Places mentioned in (blue) and related to (black) this chapter.

This chapter mentions the following places (in order of appearance):

- Athens
- Corinth
- Pontus
- Italy
- Rome
- Macedonia
- Achaia
- Cenchrea
- Ephesus
- Caesarea
- Antioch
- Galatia
- Phrygia
- Alexandria

For further information on Paul's second and third missionary journeys and the interval he spent in Corinth between them, see Second missionary journey and subsequent sections.

== Timeline ==
This part of the second missionary journey of Paul took place in c. AD 50–52, based on the time when Gallio was proconsul of Achaia.

== Corinth (18:1–11) ==
This part records the founding of the church in Corinth, which was the administrative center of the Roman province of Achaea and to become an important center for the Paul's mission. Luke notes the first meeting of Paul with Aquila and Priscilla (verse 2), who are to become his important associates, well known to the Corinthian church (1 Corinthians 16:19; cf. Romans 16:3-4).

=== Verse 1 ===
After these things Paul departed from Athens and went to Corinth.

Paul traveled from Athens to Corinth, a distance of about 82 kilometres (51 mi) on modern roads.

=== Verse 2 ===
And he found a certain Jew named Aquila, born in Pontus, who had recently come from Italy with his wife Priscilla (because Claudius had commanded all the Jews to depart from Rome); and he came to them.

The name Aquila is a Latin word. J. R. Lumby notes that "it is not likely that this was the man's Jewish name, but as the custom was among the Jews, he had probably assumed a Roman name during his dwelling in Italy and in his intercourse with the Gentiles." References to the action of Roman Emperor Claudius (in office AD 41–54) to command "all the Jews to depart from Rome" appear in the writings of Roman historians Suetonius (c. AD 69 – c. AD 122) and Cassius Dio (c. AD 150 – c. 235), and the fifth-century Christian author Paulus Orosius. Scholars generally agree that these references refer to the same incident as this verse.

=== Verse 3 ===
and because he was a tentmaker as they were, he stayed and worked with them.

Paul's trade as a tentmaker is mentioned here for the first time.

=== Verse 5 ===
When Silas and Timothy had come from Macedonia, Paul was compelled by the Spirit, and testified to the Jews that Jesus is the Christ.

Alexander suggests that Luke "may have simplified" the account of Paul's mission in Corinth, as it follows a familiar sequence (verses 4–5). For "Silas and Timothy", see 1 Thessalonians 3:1, 6. The compelling direction of "the Spirit" reflects wording in the Textus Receptus (Greek: συνειχετο τω πνευματι, syneicheto tō pneumati) which the New King James Version notes could be capitalised as "the Spirit" or read as "his spirit". Other Greek texts read συνειχετο τω λογω (syneicheto tō logō, "constrained by the word"). Heinrich Meyer argues that τῷ λόγῳ is "original" and was displaced by τῷ πνεύματι.

=== Verses 9–10 ===
And the Lord said to Paul one night in a vision, "Do not be afraid, but go on speaking and do not be silent, 10 for I am with you, and no one will attack you to harm you, for I have many in this city who are my people."

- "Vision": In the whole book, a vision will indicate where events are headed (cf. Acts 10:9–16 and 16:9–10).
- "Attack": or “to set upon, lay a hand on”; “assault” is a contemporary English equivalent very close to the meaning of the original.

== Gallio (18:12–17) ==
Following a relatively quiet period of church growth, opposition flares up again and Paul is brought before the proconsul Gallio. Proconsuls were in office only for one year, so this name provides an important chronological indicator for Luke's narrative, one of the key dates for New Testament chronology.

=== Verse 12 ===
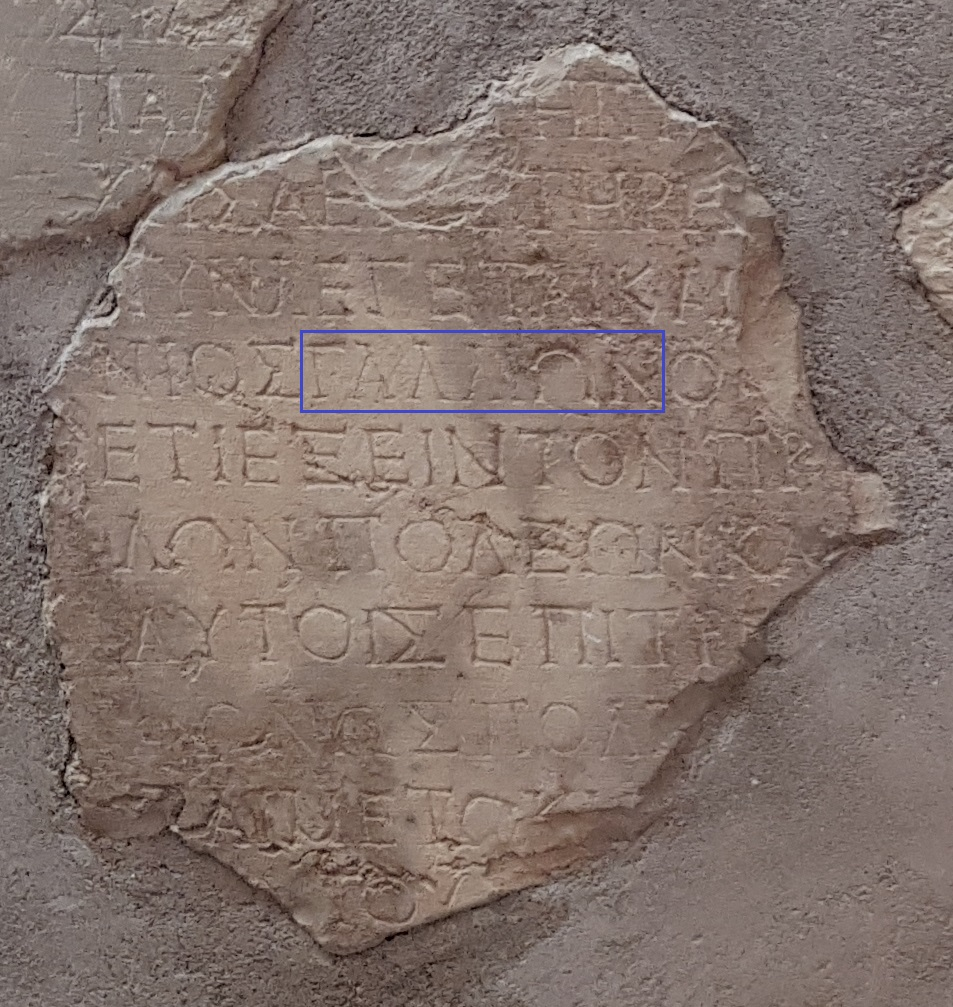
Fragment of Delphi Inscription with the name ΓΑΛΛίΩΝ ("Gallion") - Delphi museum

When Gallio was proconsul of Achaia, the Jews with one accord rose up against Paul and brought him to the judgment seat,

Lucius Junius Gallio Annaeanus or Gallio was a Roman senator and brother of the famous writer Seneca. He was the proconsul of Achaia. Gallio's tenure can be fairly accurately dated to between 51–52 AD. The reference to proconsul Gallio in the Delphi Inscription, or Gallio Inscription (IG, VII, 1676; SIG, II, 801d; AD 52) (Note: Delphi inscription can be dated during the 26th acclamation of Claudius, sometime between January 51 and August 52.) (Note: The reconstructed Delphi inscription reads: Tiber[ius Claudius Cae]sar Augustus Ge[rmanicus, invested with tribunician po]wer [for the 12th time, acclaimed Imperator for t]he 26th time, F[ather of the Fa]ther[land...]. For a l[ong time have I been not onl]y [well-disposed towards t]he ci[ty] of Delph[i, but also solicitous for its pro]sperity, and I have always guard[ed th]e cul[t of t]he [Pythian] Apol[lo. But] now [since] it is said to be desti[tu]te of [citi]zens, as [L. Jun]ius Gallio, my fri[end] an[d procon]sul, [recently reported to me, and being desirous that Delphi] should retain [inta]ct its for[mer rank, I] ord[er you (pl.) to in]vite well-born people also from [ot]her cities [to Delphi as new inhabitants....]) provides an important marker for developing a chronology of the life of Apostle Paul by relating it to the trial of Paul in Achaea mentioned in this passage. Therefore, the events of Acts 18 can be dated to this period. This is significant because it is the most accurately known date in the life of Paul.

According to the narrative in this section, he dismissed the charge brought by the Jews against the Apostle Paul. Gallio's behaviour on this occasion ("but Gallio cared for none of these things", v. 17) showed his disregard for Jewish sensitivities, and also the impartial attitude of Roman officials towards Christianity in its early days.

=== Verse 17 ===
Then all of them seized Sosthenes, the official of the synagogue, and beat him in front of the tribunal. But Gallio paid no attention to any of these things.

Some versions refer to "all the Greeks". Matthew Henry claims that the crowd that beat up Sosthenes was enraged at Paul and Gallio. They demonstrated that if Gallio would not judge that they would. Gallio's indifference to the case against Paul could be commendable for its impartiality. However Gallio's indifference to the beating up of an innocent man, Sosthenes, carried indifference too far, not only showing a contempt for the case, but also for the people presenting the case.

== Return to base (18:18-23) ==
At some point after a long and successful mission in Corinth, Paul decides to return to his base in Syria.

=== Verse 18 ===
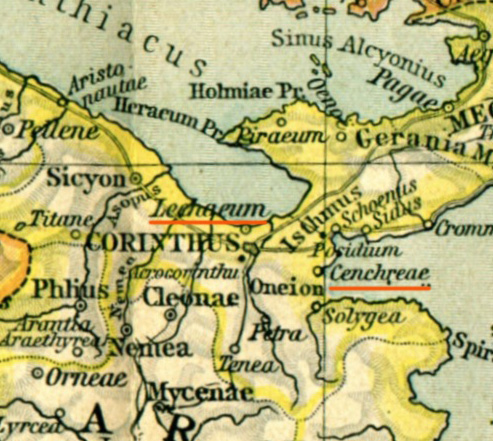
Map showing ancient ports (underlined in red) of Corinth (Corinthus): Lechaeum (Lechaion) and Cenchreae (Cenchrea)

So Paul still remained a good while. Then he took leave of the brethren and sailed for Syria, and Priscilla and Aquila were with him. He had his hair cut off at Cenchrea, for he had taken a vow.

Matthew Henry argued that the original text is ambiguous as to who had their hair cut off, it could have been Aquila or Paul. The vow was likely a Nazarite vow with the hair cut signifying completion of the vow period.

- "Cenchrea" on the east side of the isthmus was one of two ports for Corinth. It was used for sea journeys to the east via the Saronic Gulf. The other port, Lechaion on the Corinthian Gulf, served the trade routes leading west (to Italy and beyond). In the Epistle to the Romans a church was mentioned to be there, of which Phoebe was a deacon and patron (Romans 16:1–2).

== Interlude: Apollos in Corinth (18:24-28) ==
In an interlude, Luke gives a rare glimpse of Apollos, an Alexandrian Jew, an independent missionary at work within the almost-exclusive Pauline sphere. Apollos is a member of one of the largest Jewish communities in the ancient world, with a complex and well-established tradition of philosophical hermeneutics of which Philo is the best-known proponent (cf. 1 Corinthians 1:12; 3:4-9; 4:6; 16:12). Perhaps because he displays some of the 'wisdom' that Paul lacks, Apollos has gained a following within the Corinthian church. Apollos received a sufficiently Christian instruction (katechesis) to speak about 'the way of the Lord' (verse 25), but it stops short at the 'baptism of John' (Acts 19:3). Priscilla and Aquila presumably heard Apollos in the synagogue and then provide whatever further instruction is needed (verse 26).

=== Verse 26 ===
And he began to speak boldly in the synagogue: whom when Aquila and Priscilla had heard, they took him unto them, and expounded unto him the way of God more perfectly.

- "More perfectly": translated from Greek ἀκριβέστερον, akribesteron, "more accurately".

== See also ==
- Apollos
- Claudius
- Priscilla and Aquila
- Sosthenes
- Acts 14, Acts 15, Acts 16, Acts 17

== Sources ==
- Alexander, Loveday (2007). "62. Acts". In Barton, John; Muddiman, John (eds.). The Oxford Bible Commentary (first (paperback) ed.). Oxford University Press. pp. 1028–1061. ISBN 978-0199277186.
