= Acts 19 =

- ← chapter 18 chapter 20 →
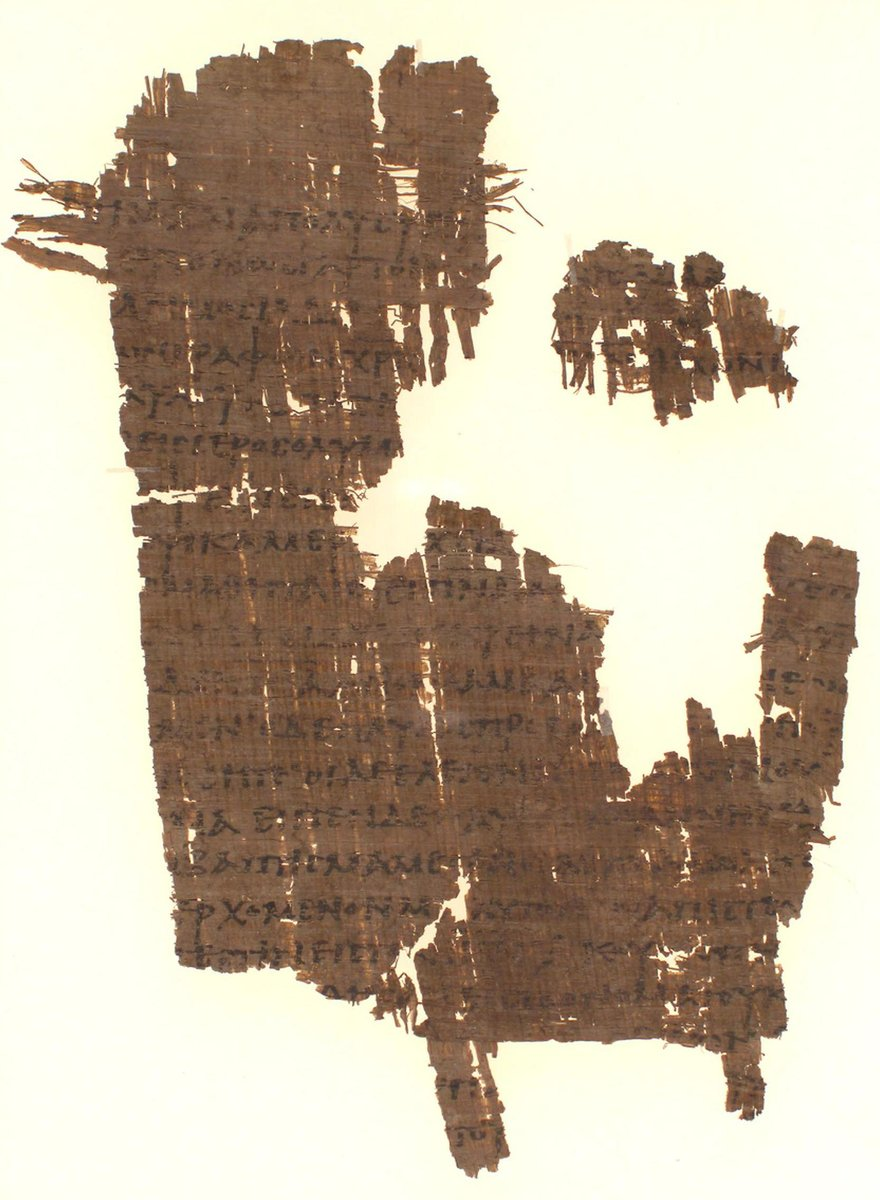
- Acts 18:27–19:6 on recto side in Papyrus 38, written about AD 250.
- Book: Acts of the Apostles
- Category: Church history
- Christian Bible part: New Testament
- Order in the Christian part: 5

Acts 19 is the nineteenth chapter of the Acts of the Apostles in the New Testament of the Christian Bible. It records part of the third missionary journey of Paul, focussing on his time spent in Ephesus. Early Christian tradition uniformly affirmed that Luke composed this book as well as the Gospel of Luke. Critical opinion on the tradition was evenly divided at the end of the 20th century.

== Text ==
The original text was written in Koine Greek. This chapter is divided into 41 verses.

=== Textual witnesses ===
Some early manuscripts containing the text of this chapter are:

- Papyrus 38 (~AD 250)
- Codex Vaticanus (325–350)
- Codex Sinaiticus (330–360)
- Codex Bezae (~400)
- Codex Alexandrinus (400–440)
- Codex Laudianus (~550)

== Locations ==
Places mentioned in (blue) and related to (black) this chapter.

This chapter mentions the following places (in the order of appearance):

- Corinth
- Ephesus
- Asia (Roman province)
- Macedonia
- Achaia
- Jerusalem
- Rome

== Timeline ==
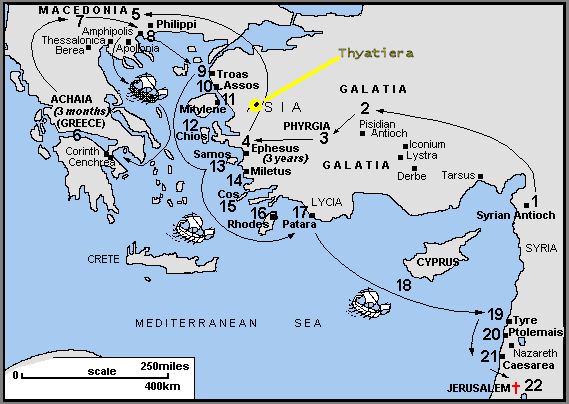
Map of apostle Paul's third journey.

This part of the third missionary journey of Paul took place in ca. AD 53–55.

== Paul's ministry in Ephesus (verses 1–22) ==
This section covers Paul's long stay in Ephesus, lasting 3 years, where he encountered "some disciples" of John the Baptist and confronted the influence of magic and occult in that city.

=== Verse 1 ===
And it came to pass, that, while Apollos was at Corinth, Paul having passed through the upper coasts came to Ephesus: and finding certain disciples,'

The "upper coasts" (wording of the King James Version) or "upper regions" (New King James Version), are thought to have been inland areas to the east of Ephesus. The English Standard Version refers to "the inland country". Henry Alford suggests that Paul travelled through "the eastern parts of Asia Minor, beyond the river Halys" (now the Kizilirmak River).

=== Verse 4 ===
Then Paul said, "John indeed baptized with a baptism of repentance, saying to the people that they should believe on Him who would come after him, that is, on Christ Jesus".

"Believe on him" is the translation used by the King James Version and New King James Version. The more natural phrase "believe in him" is used by the New American Standard Bible.

=== Verse 11 ===
So remarkable were the miracles worked by God at Paul's hands ...

Loveday Alexander notes that Luke's emphasis on God as the worker of miracles is not typical of his narrative: he sees it as important to appreciate that Paul's spiritual power does not come from himself but is a direct divine endorsement of his mission". Methodist writer Joseph Benson suggests that as Paul stayed longer in Ephesus than elsewhere on his journeys, the miracles wrought through him would have stood out both in number and in wonder.

=== Verse 14 ===
Also there were seven sons of Sceva, a Jewish chief priest, who did so (i.e. attempted to heal using the name of the Lord Jesus).

Sceva (Ancient Greek: Σκευᾶς, romanized: Skeuas) was a Jew called a "chief priest" (Greek: ιουδαιου αρχιερεως). Some scholars note that it was not uncommon for some members of the Zadokite clan to take on an unofficial high-priestly role, which may explain this moniker. However, it is more likely that he was an itinerant exorcist based on the use of the Greek term (Ancient Greek: περιερχομένων, romanized: perierchomenōn) "going from place to place" in Acts 19:13.

In this verse, it is recorded that he had seven sons who attempted to exorcise a demon from a man in Ephesus by using the name of Jesus as an invocation. This practice is similar to the Jewish practice, originating in the Testament of Solomon, of invoking Angels to cast out demons. Sorcery and exorcism are mentioned several times in Acts: Simon Magus and Elymas Bar-Jesus, and divination is illustrated by the girl at Philippi. "She was regarded as spirit-possessed, and it was the spirit who was addressed and expelled by Paul in Acts 16:16–18".

=== Verse 15 ===
And the evil spirit answered and said, “Jesus I know, and Paul I know; but who are you?”

This evil spirit had heard of both Jesus and Paul, but not of the seven sons of Sceva, which soon received 'such a beating' from the spirit 'that they ran' (Acts 19:16); theologian Conrad Gempf argues that this shows that power over evil spirits does not work in a mechanical way in the name of Jesus, but because one knows Jesus and, more importantly, is known by him.

=== Verse 19 ===
Also, many of those who had practiced magic brought their books together and burned them in the sight of all. And they counted up the value of them, and it totaled fifty thousand pieces of silver.

- "50,000 pieces of silver": or "50,000 drachmas" (1 drachma represents the average wage for a day) representing over 135 years' wages.

=== Verse 21 ===
When these things were accomplished, Paul purposed in the Spirit, when he had passed through Macedonia and Achaia, to go to Jerusalem, saying, "After I have been there, I must also see Rome".

Paul has already intended to have his trip to Jerusalem followed with a trip to Rome.

== The riot in Ephesus (verses 23–41) ==
The amount of money in the scroll-burning incident (verse 19) must have stirred many people, whose livelihood (that is dependent on the selling of religious objects) is threatened by the successful growth of the Christian church, and now is bolstering a serious opposition.

=== Verse 23 ===
And about that time there arose a great commotion about the Way.

Reference to Christian belief as "the Way" was already made in Acts 9:2. "The expression "the way" had evidently become a well-known one among Christians".

=== Verse 29 ===
So the whole city was filled with confusion, and rushed into the theater with one accord, having seized Gaius and Aristarchus, Macedonians, Paul's travel companions.

- "Aristarchus": One of Paul's travel companions, a Macedonian from Thessalonica, who is known from some references in the Acts of the Apostles (19:29; 20:4; 27:2) and Colossians 4:10.

=== Verse 33 ===
And they drew Alexander out of the multitude, the Jews putting him forward. And Alexander motioned with his hand, and wanted to make his defense to the people.

- "Alexander": was "to make a defense" for the Jews in order to distance themselves from the Christians. Could be the Alexander of 1 Timothy 1:20 and maybe the Alexander the Coppersmith of 2 Timothy 4:14.

== See also ==
- Apollos
- Diana (mythology)
- Erastus of Corinth
- John the Baptist
- Timothy
- Acts 14, Acts 15, Acts 16, Acts 17, Acts 18, 1 Timothy 1, and 2 Timothy 4

== Sources ==
- Coogan, Michael David (2007). Coogan, Michael David; Brettler, Marc Zvi; Newsom, Carol Ann; Perkins, Pheme (eds.). The New Oxford Annotated Bible with the Apocryphal/Deuterocanonical Books: New Revised Standard Version, Issue 48 (Augmented 3rd ed.). Oxford University Press. ISBN 9780195288810.
- Gempf, Conrad (1994). "Acts". In Carson, D. A.; France, R. T.; Motyer, J. A.; Wenham, G. J. (eds.). New Bible Commentary: 21st Century Edition (4, illustrated, reprint, revised ed.). Inter-Varsity Press. pp. 1066–1107. ISBN 9780851106489.
