= Trophimus =

Christian who accompanied Paul during a part of his third missionary journey

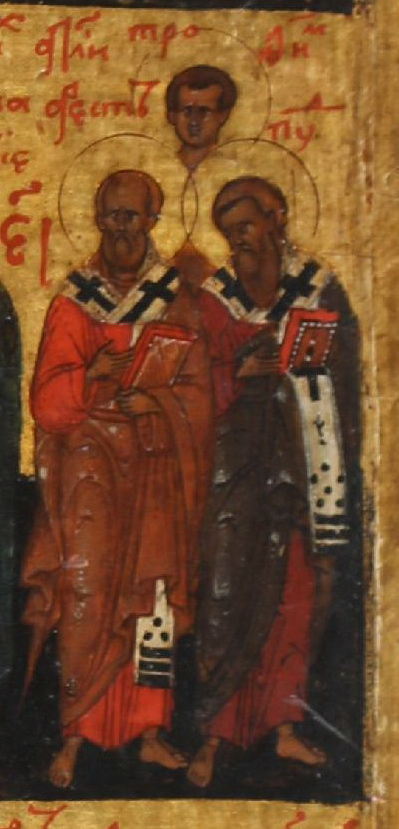
Apostles Aristarchus of Apamea, Pudens, and Trophimus

Trophimus /ˈtrɒfɪməs, ˈtroʊ-/ (Greek: Τρόφιμος, Tróphimos) or Trophimus the Ephesian (Greek: Τρόφιμος ὁ Ἐφέσιος, Tróphimos ho Ephésios) was a Christian who accompanied Paul during a part of his third missionary journey. He was with Paul in Jerusalem, and the Jews, supposing that the apostle had brought him into the temple, raised a tumult which resulted in Paul's imprisonment. (See Herod's Temple). In writing to Timothy, the apostle comments that he left Trophimus in Miletus due to illness. This must refer to some event not noticed in the Acts.

His feast is kept on 29 December.

== Background ==
Trophimus and companion Tychicus are called "Asianoi"(Acts 20:4). He was from Edessa.

== Companion to Paul ==
Trophimus was one of eight friends (Acts 20:4), who accompanied Paul at the close of his third missionary journey and traveled with him from Greece, through Macedonia, into Asia, and onward by sea until Jerusalem was reached. Trophimus completed the journey with Paul, for, in the passages Acts 21:29, he is mentioned as being with Paul in Jerusalem immediately on the close of this journey.

=== Cause of Apostle Paul's Arrest ===
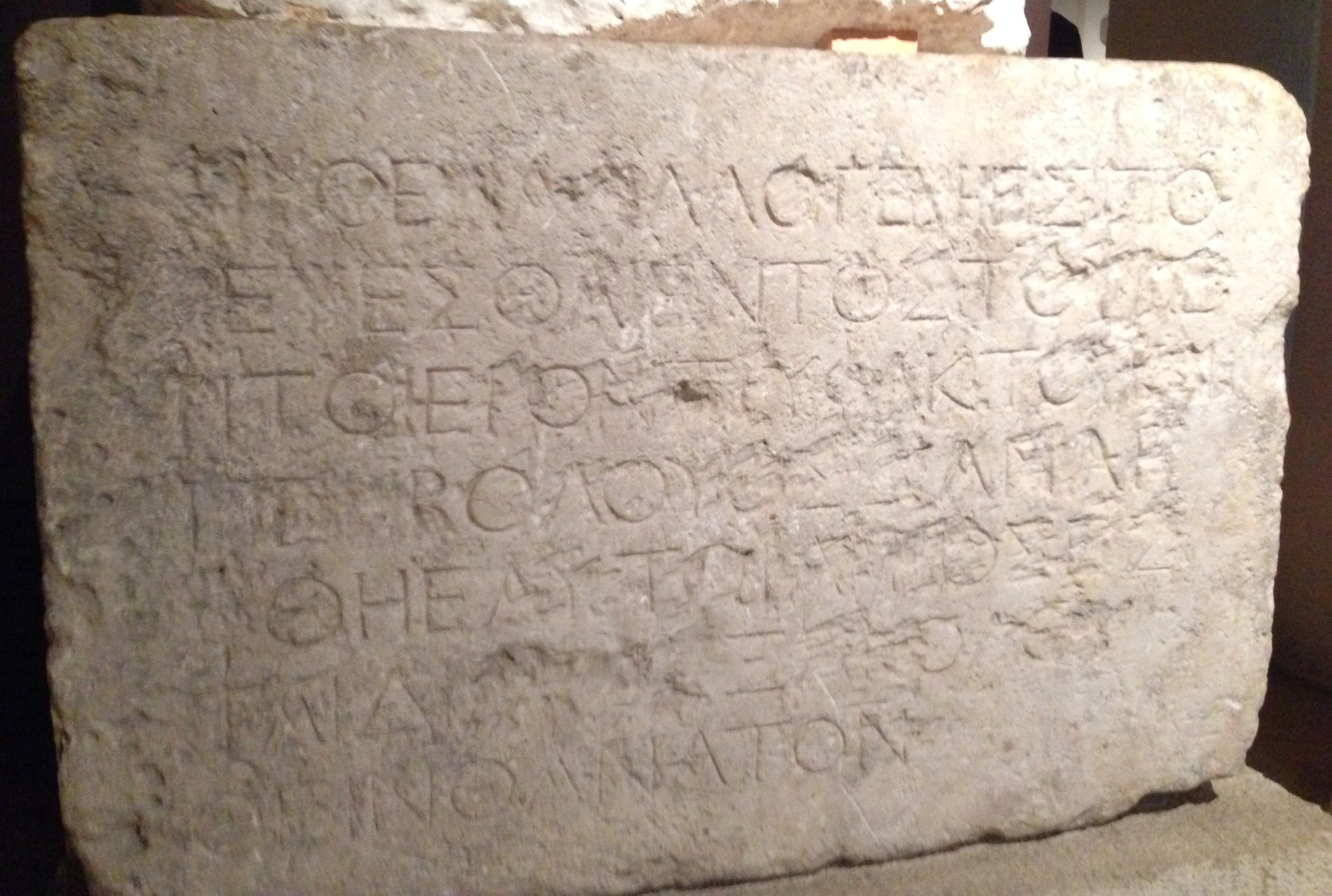
Jerusalem Temple Warning inscription from the Second Temple period (23 BC-70 AD), stating in Greek language that no foreigner should go within the holy place of the Temple complex

He was the cause of Paul being assaulted in the courts of the temple by the mob, and then of his being arrested and imprisoned by the Romans. The occasion of this outrage was that Paul had "brought Greeks also into the temple, and....defiled this holy place" (Acts 21:28).

=== Left at Miletus ===
Trophimus is also mentioned in 2 Timothy 4:20: "Trophimus I left at Miletus sick." This shows that he was again — several years after the date indicated in the previous passages — traveling with Paul on one of the missionary journeys which the apostle undertook after being liberated from his first imprisonment in Rome.

== Unnamed brother ==
It has been conjectured that Trophimus is to be identified with the person mentioned in 2 Corinthians 8:16-24. There, Paul speaks in the highest terms of one of his companions whom he sent with Titus but does not provide his name. Titus and this disciple were evidently, those to whose care Paul entrusted the carrying of the Second Epistle to the Corinthians. The apostle says of this unnamed brother, not only that his praise is in the gospel throughout all the churches, but also that he was chosen by the churches to travel with him.

== Relevant verses ==
Sopater the Berean, son of Pyrrhus, accompanied him; and of the Thessalonians, Aristarchus and Secundus; and Gaius of Derbe, and Timothy; and the Asians, Tychius and Trophimus.

— Acts 20:4

For they had previously seen Trophimus the Ephesian with him in the city, they supposed that Paul had brought him into the temple.

— Acts 21:29

Erastus remained at Corinth, and I left Trophimus, who was ill, at Miletus.

— 2 Timothy 4:20 ESV
