= Papyrus 38 =

Papyrus 𝔓^{38}
- New Testament manuscript
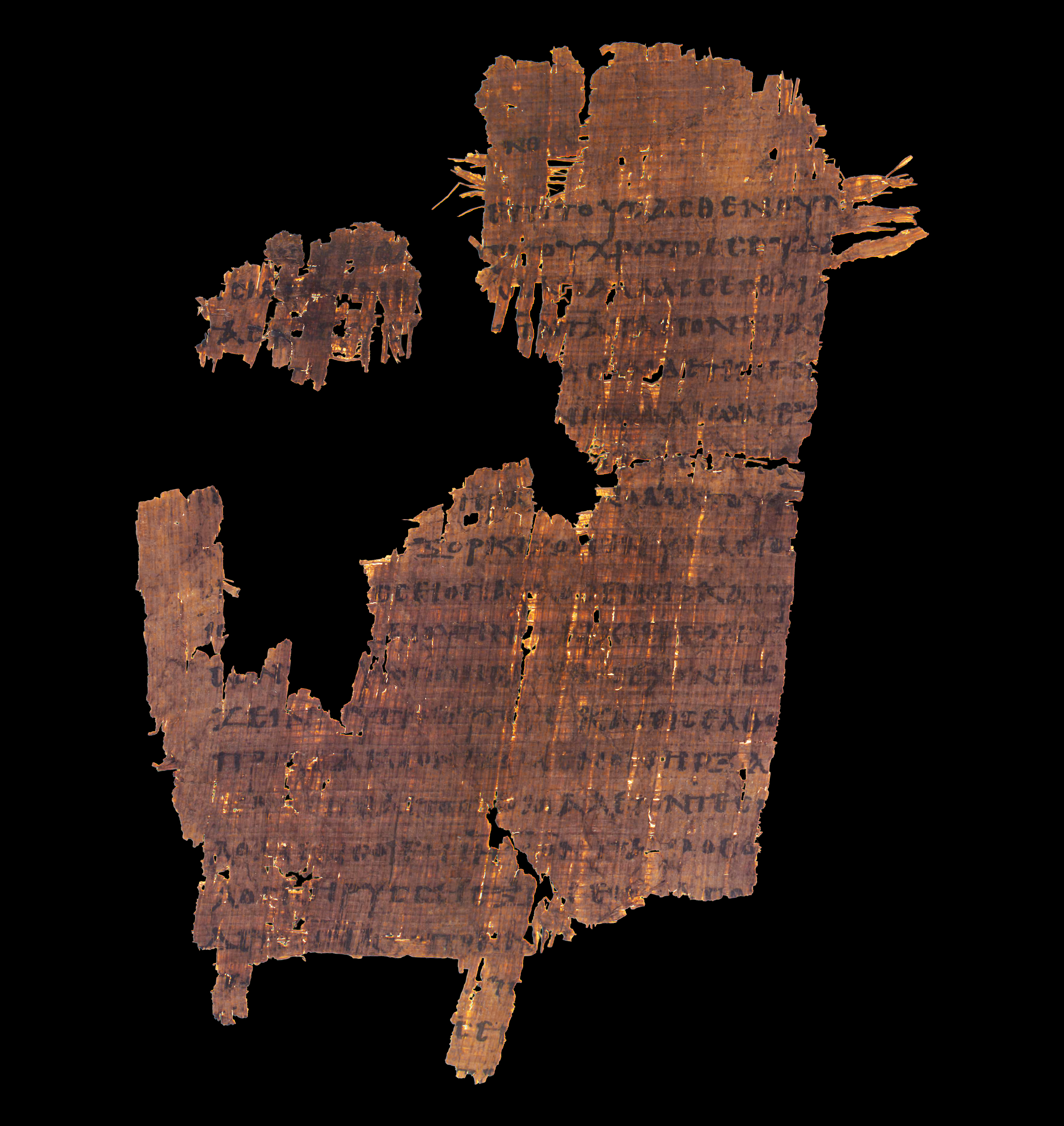
- Recto Acts 18:27 – 19:6
- Text: Acts 18-19 †
- Date: ca. 220
- Script: Greek
- Found: Egypt
- Now at: University of Michigan
- Cite: H. A. Sanders."A Papyrus Fragment of Acts in the Michigan Collection", HTR, vol. 20. 1927, pp. 1-19.
- Size: 14 x 27
- Type: Western text-type
- Category: IV

Papyrus 38 (in the Gregory-Aland numbering), designated by 𝔓^{38}, is an early copy of part of the New Testament in Greek. It is a papyrus manuscript of the Acts of the Apostles, it contains only Acts 18:27-19:6.12-16. The manuscript paleographically has been assigned to the early 3rd century.

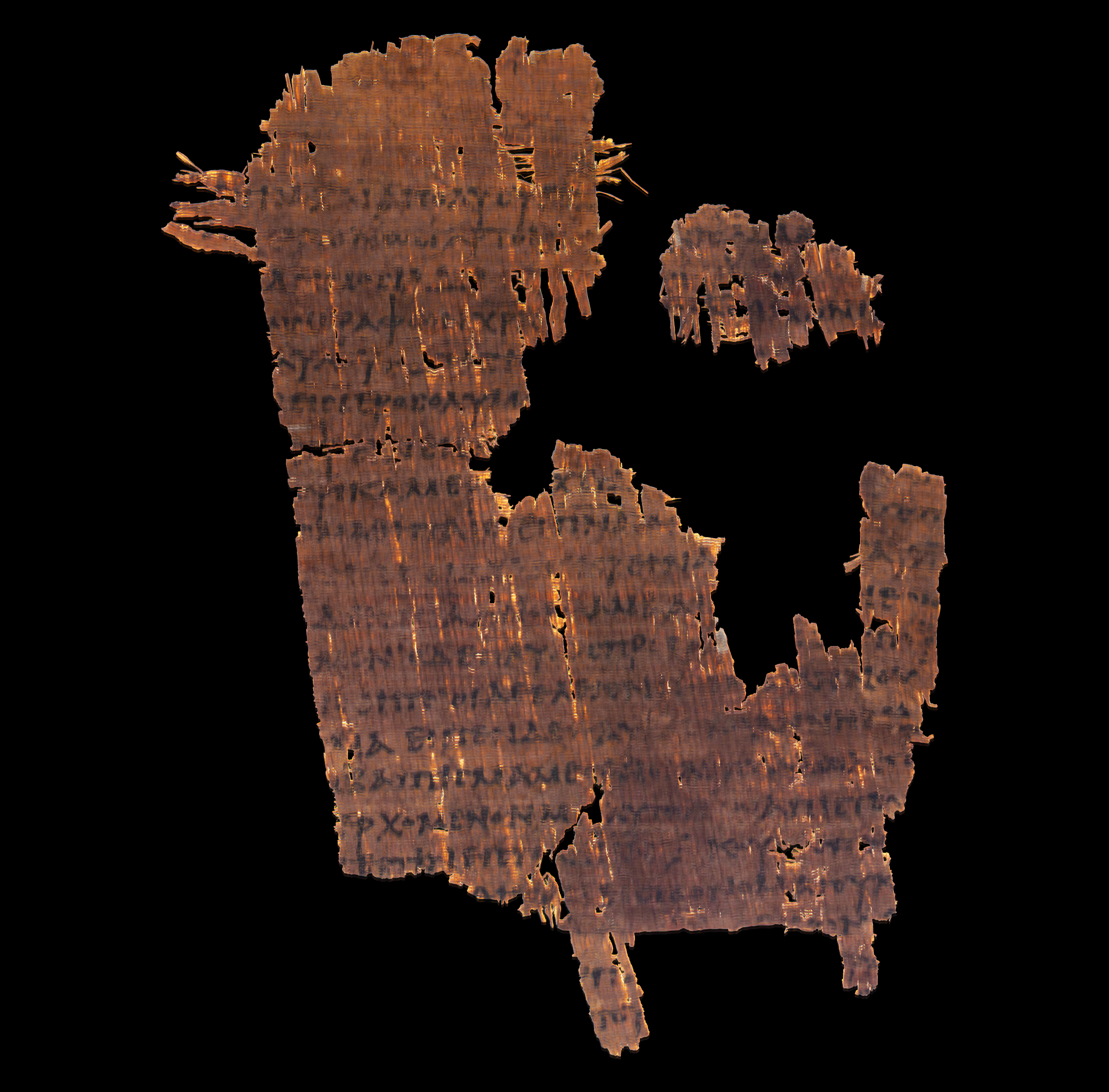
Verso Acts 19:12–16

Although the text is quite short, the Greek text of this codex has been called a representative of the Western text-type. Aland named it as Free text and placed in Category IV. The text of this manuscript is related to Codex Bezae.

The manuscript was purchased in Cairo in 1924.

It is now in the University of Michigan (Inv. 1571) in Ann Arbor.

== See also ==
- Acts 18
- List of New Testament papyri
