= Christianity in the 1st century =

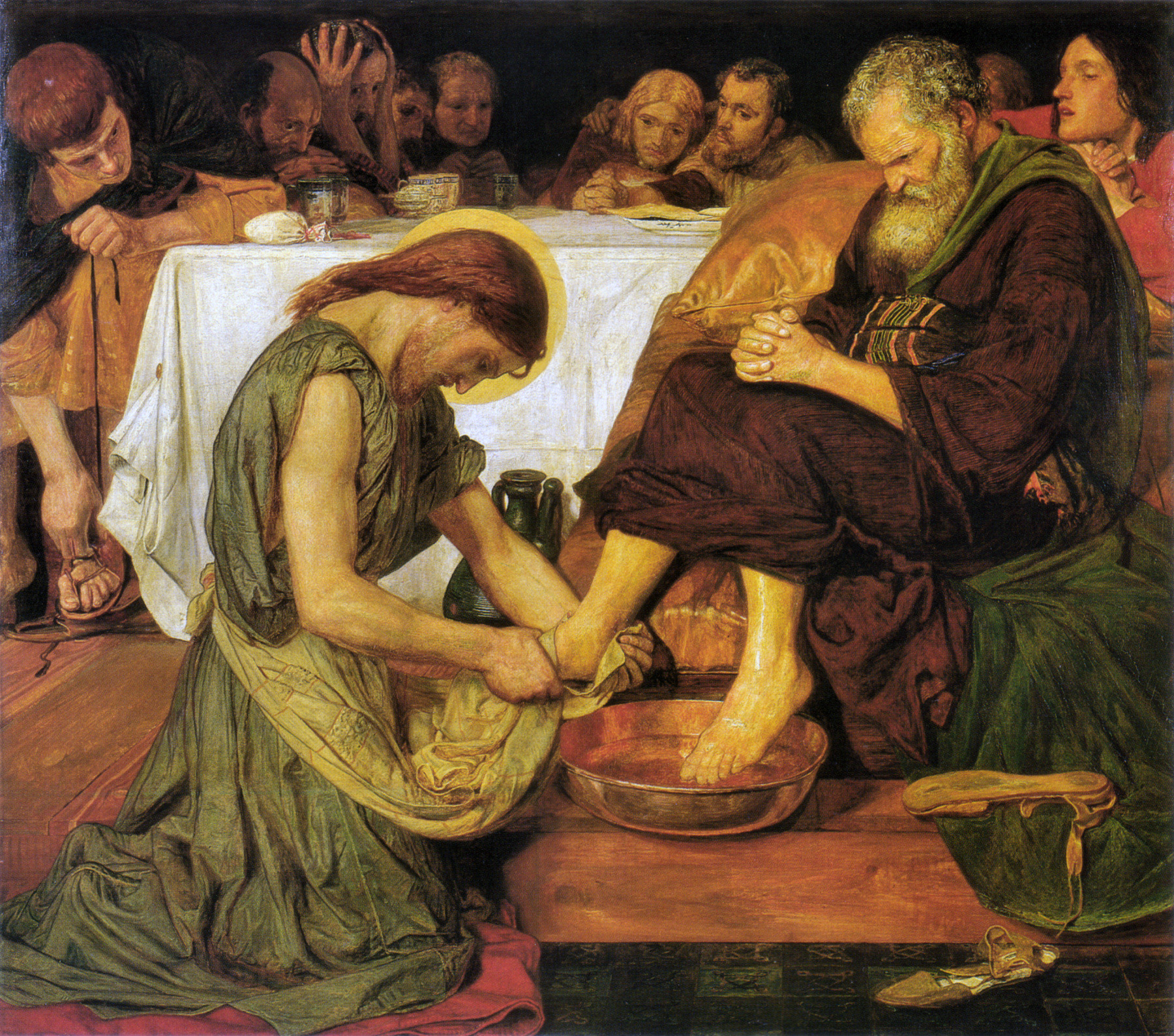
Jesus Washing Peter's Feet, painting by Ford Madox Brown (1852–1856), Tate Britain, London

Christianity in the 1st century covers the formative history of Christianity from the start of the ministry of Jesus (c. 27–29 AD) to the death of the last of the Twelve Apostles (c. 100) and is thus also known as the "Apostolic Age." Early Christianity developed out of the ministry of Jesus. Subsequent to Jesus' death, his earliest followers formed an apocalyptic messianic Jewish sect during the late Second Temple period of the 1st century.

Paul the Apostle, a Pharisee who had persecuted the early Christians of Judea, converted c. 33–36 and began to proselytize among the Gentiles. According to Paul, Gentile converts were exempted from Jewish commandments relating to conversion. He argued that all are justified by their faith in Jesus. This was part of a gradual split between early Christianity and Judaism, and Christianity became a distinct religion that included predominantly Gentile adherence.

Jerusalem had an early Christian community led by James the Just, Peter, and John. According to Acts 11:26, it was in Antioch that the followers were first called Christians. Peter was later martyred in Rome, the capital of the Roman Empire. The apostles went on to spread the message of the Gospel around the classical world and founded apostolic sees around the early centers of Christianity. The last apostle to die was John in c. 100. (Note: Zahn, Theodor. "John the Apostle", The New Schaff-Herzog Encyclopedia of Religious Knowledge, Vol. VI, (Philip Schaff, ed.) CCEL)

== Etymology ==
Early Jewish Christians referred to themselves as "The Way" (ἡ ὁδός), probably coming from Isaiah 40:3, "prepare the way of the LORD." (Note: Larry Hurtado (August 17, 2017), "Paul, the Pagans' Apostle") (Note: It appears in the Acts of the Apostles, Acts 9:2, Acts 19:9 and Acts 19:23). Some English translations of the New Testament capitalize "the Way" (e.g. the New King James Version and the English Standard Version), indicating that this was how "the new religion seemed then to be designated" (Note: "Jamieson-Fausset-Brown Bible Commentary on Acts 19". Bible Hub. See also: Jamieson-Fausset-Brown Bible Commentary.) whereas others treat the phrase as indicative—"the way", "that way" (Note: American King James Version) or "the way of the Lord". (Note: Douai-Rheims Bible) The Syriac version reads, "the way of God" and the Vulgate Latin version, "the way of the Lord". See also Sect of "The Way", "The Nazarenes" and "Christians": Names given to the Early Church.) Other Jews also called them "the Nazarenes." According to Acts 11:26, the term Christian (Greek: Χριστιανός), meaning "follower of Christ," was first used in reference to Jesus's disciples in the city of Antioch. The earliest recorded use of the term "Christianity" (Greek: Χριστιανισμός) was by Ignatius of Antioch, in around 100 AD.

== Origins ==
=== Jewish–Hellenistic background ===
The earliest Christians were an apocalyptic sect within Second Temple Judaism. The basic tenet of Second Temple Judaism was ethical monotheism. Jews believed God had chosen them to be his people and had made a covenant with them. As part of this covenant, God gave his people the Torah (Law) to guide them in their worship of God and in their interactions with each other. The law required Jews to observe the Sabbath, follow kosher dietary laws, and circumcise their male children. Judaism's holiest place was the Temple in Jerusalem, where a hereditary priesthood offered sacrifices of incense, food, and various kinds of animals to God. Sacrifices could be offered only at the Temple, but Jews in both Palestine and throughout the Diaspora established synagogues as centers of prayer and study of Judaism's sacred scriptures.

Christianity "emerged as a sect of Judaism in Roman Palestine" in the Hellenistic world of the first century AD, which was dominated by Roman law and Greek culture. A major challenge for Jews during this time was how to respond to Hellenization and remain faithful to their religious traditions. During the early 1st century AD, there were many competing Jewish sects in the Holy Land, including Pharisees, Sadducees, Essenes, and other groups. Each group adopted different stances toward Hellenization.

In this context of foreign domination, Jewish apocalypticism became widespread. Apocalypticism is the belief that God would soon destroy the cosmic forces of evil currently ruling the world and establish an eternal kingdom. To accomplish this, God would send a savior figure or messiah. Messiah (Hebrew: meshiach) means "anointed" and is used in the Bible to designate Jewish kings and in some cases priests and prophets whose status was symbolized by being anointed with holy anointing oil.

It can refer to people chosen by God for a specific task, such as the whole Israelite nation (1 Chronicles 16:22; Psalm 105:15) or Cyrus the Great who ended the Babylonian captivity (Isaiah 45:1). The term is most associated with King David, to whom God promised an eternal kingdom (2 Samuel 7:11–17). After the destruction of David's kingdom and lineage, this promise was reaffirmed by the prophets Isaiah, Jeremiah, and Ezekiel, who foresaw a future Davidic king who would establish and reign over an idealized kingdom.

In the Second Temple period, there was no consensus on who the messiah would be or what he would do. Most commonly, he was imagined to be an Endtimes son of David going about the business of "executing judgment, defeating the enemies of God, reigning over a restored Israel, establishing unending peace." The messiah was often referred to as "King Messiah" (Hebrew: מלך משיח, romanized: melekh mashiach) or malka meshiḥa in Aramaic. Yet, there were other kinds of messianic figures proposed as well—the perfect priest or the celestial Son of Man who brings about the resurrection of the dead and the final judgment. The concept has its root in the apocalyptic literature of the 2nd century BC to 1st century BC.

=== Demographics ===
According to the Book of Acts, within a year of Jesus' death, there were about 5,000 believers (Acts 4:4). However, many historians do not believe the numbers given in the Book of Acts. (Note: The number of Christians in the book of Acts) They believe that in 60 AD, there were hundreds, but not tens of thousands of Christians. At the end of the 1st century AD, they estimate there were 7000–7500 Christians in the whole world. (Note: The number of Christians in mainstream history) Bart Ehrman supports the figures of 1000–1500 Christians in 60 AD, and 7000–10000 Christians in 100 AD. Keith Hopkins and Christopher Kelly support the figure of 1400 Christians in 50 AD.

=== Life and ministry of Jesus ===
==== Sources ====
Christian sources, such as the four canonical gospels, the Pauline epistles, and the New Testament apocrypha, (Note: E. P. Sanders, Jaroslav Jan Pelikan, Jesus, Encyclopædia Britannica) include detailed stories about Jesus, but scholars differ on the historicity of specific episodes described in the Biblical accounts of Jesus. The Gospels are theological documents, which "provide information the authors regarded as necessary for the religious development of the Christian communities in which they worked." They consist of short passages, or pericopes, arranged in various ways as suited their aims.

Non-Christian sources that are used to study and establish the historicity of Jesus include Jewish sources such as Josephus, and Roman sources such as Tacitus. These sources are compared to Christian sources such as the Pauline epistles and the Synoptic Gospels. These sources are usually independent of each other (e.g. Jewish sources do not draw upon Roman sources), and similarities and differences between them are used in the authentication process.

==== Historical person ====
Biblical scholar Graham Stanton notes that "nearly all historians, whether Christian or not, accept that Jesus existed" and that more is known about him than any other 1st- or 2nd-century religious teacher with the exception of Paul. The two events of Jesus' life subject to "almost universal assent" are that Jesus was baptized by John the Baptist and was crucified by the order of Pontius Pilate, the Roman prefect. Biblical scholar Amy-Jill Levine summarizes the scholarly consensus on Jesus' life as follows:

Most scholars agree that Jesus was baptized by John, debated with fellow Jews on how best to live according to God's will, engaged in healings and exorcisms, taught in parables, gathered male and female followers in Galilee, went to Jerusalem, and was crucified by Roman soldiers during the governorship of Pontius Pilate (26–36 CE). But, to use the old cliché, the devil is in the details.

There is widespread disagreement among scholars on the details of the life of Jesus mentioned in the gospel narratives, and on the meaning of his teachings. Concerning the accuracy of the accounts, viewpoints run the gamut from considering them inerrant descriptions of Jesus's life, to doubting whether they are historically reliable on a number of points, to considering them to provide very little historical information about his life beyond the basics. According to Bart Ehrman, the gospels are "filled with nonhistorical material, accounts of events that could not have happened" and with contradictory accounts of the same events. As historical sources, the gospels have to be "weighed and assessed critically." Scholars often draw a distinction between the Jesus of history and the Christ of faith, and two different accounts can be found in this regard.

Academic scholars have constructed a variety of portraits and profiles for Jesus. Contemporary scholarship places Jesus firmly in the Jewish tradition, and the most prominent understanding of Jesus is as a Jewish apocalyptic prophet or eschatological teacher. (Note: The notion of Apocalyptic prophet is shared by E. P. Sanders a main proponent of the New Perspective on Paul, and Bart Ehrman.) Other portraits are the charismatic healer, (Note: According to E. P. Sanders, Jesus's ideas on healing and forgiveness were in line with Second Temple Jewish thought and would not have been likely to provoke controversy among the Jewish authorities of his day.) the Cynic philosopher, the Jewish Messiah, and the prophet of social change. (Note: In a review of the state of research, Amy-Jill Levine stated that "no single picture of Jesus has convinced all, or even most scholars" and that all portraits of Jesus are subject to criticism by some group of scholars.)

==== Ministry and eschatological expectations ====
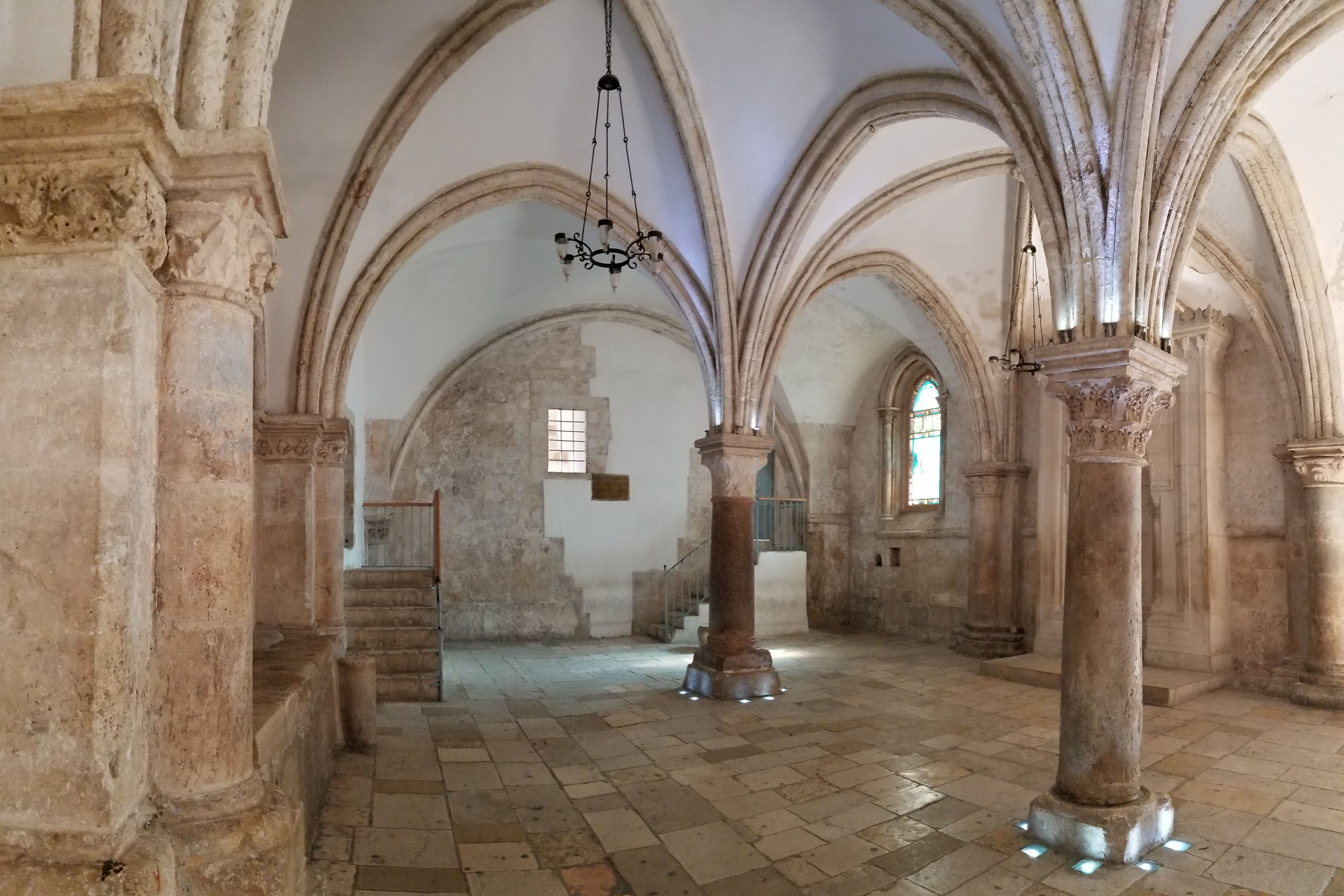
The Cenacle on Mount Zion in Jerusalem, claimed to be the location of the Last Supper and Pentecost

In the canonical gospels, the ministry of Jesus begins with his baptism in the countryside of Roman Judea and Transjordan, near the Jordan River, and ends in Jerusalem, following the Last Supper with his disciples. (Note: Jesus' early Galilean ministry begins when after his baptism, he goes back to Galilee from his time in the Judean desert. In this early period he preaches around Galilee and recruits his first disciples who begin to travel with him and eventually form the core of the early Church. The major Galilean ministry which begins in Matthew 8 includes the commissioning of the Twelve Apostles, and covers most of the ministry of Jesus in Galilee. The final Galilean ministry begins after the death of John the Baptist as Jesus prepares to go to Jerusalem. In the later Judean ministry Jesus starts his final journey to Jerusalem through Judea. The final ministry in Jerusalem is sometimes called the Passion Week and begins with Jesus' triumphal entry into Jerusalem. The gospels provide more details about the final ministry than the other periods, devoting about one third of their text to the last week of the life of Jesus in Jerusalem.) The Gospel of Luke (Luke 3:23) states that Jesus was "about 30 years of age" at the start of his ministry. A chronology of Jesus typically has the date of the start of his ministry estimated at AD 27–29 and the end in the range AD 30–36.

In the Synoptic Gospels (Matthew, Mark and Luke), Jewish eschatology stands central. After being baptized by John the Baptist, Jesus teaches extensively for a year, or maybe just a few months, (Note: Sanders and Pelikan: "Besides presenting a longer ministry than do the other Gospels, John also describes several trips to Jerusalem. Only one is mentioned in the Synoptics. Both outlines are plausible, but a ministry of more than two years leaves more questions unanswered than does one of a few months.") about the coming Kingdom of God (or, in Matthew, the Kingdom of Heaven), in aphorisms and parables, using similes and figures of speech. In the Gospel of John, Jesus himself is the main subject.

The Synoptic Gospels present different views on the Kingdom of God. While the Kingdom is essentially described as eschatological, some texts present the Kingdom as already being present, while other texts depict the Kingdom as a place in heaven that one enters after death, or as the presence of God on earth. (Note: The Kingdom is described as both imminent (Mark 1:15) and already present in the ministry of Jesus (Luke 17:21) (Others interpret "Kingdom of God" to mean a way of living, or as a period of evangelization; no overall consensus among scholars has emerged on its meaning.) Jesus promises inclusion in the Kingdom for those who accept his message (Mark 10:13–27)). While some sayings suggest Jesus expected the end to be close, others place time between his presence and the final events, which suggests that Jesus understood the coming of the kingdom of God to be conditional on repentance with a changeable date. Jesus talks as expecting the coming of the "Son of Man" from heaven, an apocalyptic figure, who would initiate "the coming judgment and the redemption of Israel." According to Davies, the Sermon on the Mount presents Jesus as the new Moses who brings a New Law, a reference to the Law of Moses, the Messianic Torah.

==== Death and resurrection ====
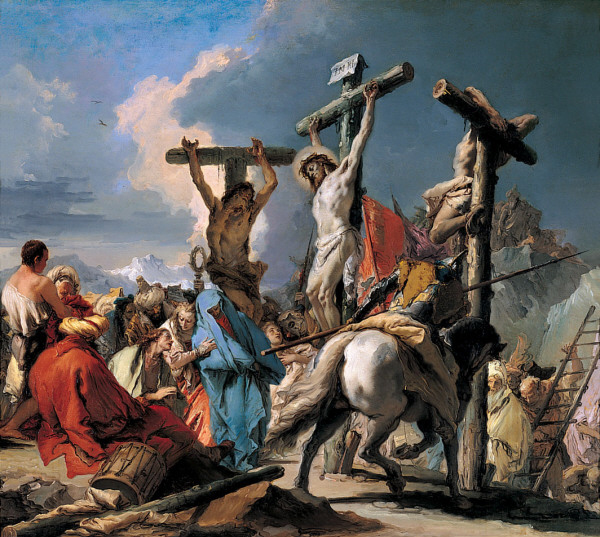
The Crucifixion, by Giovanni Battista Tiepolo, c. 1745–1750, Saint Louis Art Museum

Jesus' life was ended by his execution by crucifixion. His early followers believed that three days after his death, Jesus rose bodily from the dead. Paul's letters and the Gospels contain reports of a number of appearances after his death and burial.

Conservative Christian scholars, in addition to apologists and theologians, generally present these as being descriptions of real appearances of a resurrected and transformed physical body. According to N.T. Wright, there is substantial unanimity among the early Christian writers in the first and second century, that Jesus had been bodily raised from the dead. Craig L. Blomberg argues there are sufficient arguments for the historicity of the resurrection. In secular and Liberal Christian scholarship, the appearances are argued to be descriptions of visionary post-mortem experiences of Jesus.

According to this view, Jesus' death was reinterpreted as an eschatological event, feeding ecstatic experiences of Jesus, and the sense of Jesus being alive "signalled for earliest believers that the days of eschatological fulfilment were at hand." (Note: Larry Hurtado (December 4, 2018), ″'When Christians were Jews': Paula Fredriksen on 'The First Generation'″) Gerd Lüdemann argues that Peter had a vision of Jesus, induced by feelings of guilt for betraying Jesus. The vision elevated his feeling of guilt, and Peter experienced it as a real appearance of Jesus, who was raised from the dead. (Note: Bart Ehrman (5 oct. 2012), Gerd Lüdemann on the Resurrection of Jesus)

The belief in the resurrection of Jesus gave the impetus in certain Christian sects to the exaltation of Jesus to the status of divine Son and Lord of God's Kingdom and the resumption of their missionary activity. His followers expected Jesus to begin the Kingdom of God.

== Jewish Christianity ==
Christianity originated as a Jewish movement in Judaea during the 1st century AD, within the context of late Second Temple Judaism. Traditionally, the period from the death of Jesus until the death of the last of the Twelve Apostles is called the Apostolic Age. According to the Bible, the first Christians were men and women who had known Jesus and who witnessed to his resurrection.

The earliest followers of Jesus were Jews who understood his life, death, and expected return through familiar Jewish apocalyptic and messianic frameworks. They remained embedded in Jewish religious life and did not initially conceive of themselves as departing from Israel or founding a new faith. Following their conviction that Jesus had been raised from the dead, they established a community in Jerusalem. They were a Jewish sect with an apocalyptic eschatology. They regarded Jesus as Lord, resurrected messiah, and the eternally existing Son of God (Note: According to Shaye J.D. Cohen, Jesus's failure to establish an independent Israel, and his death at the hands of the Romans, caused many Jews to reject him as the Messiah. Jews at that time were expecting a military leader as a Messiah, such as Bar Kohhba.) and expected the Second Coming of Jesus and the start of the Kingdom of God.

They pressed fellow Jews to prepare for these events and to follow "the way" of the Lord. They believed Yahweh to be the only true God. This early community was led by the three Pillars of the Church: James the Just, Peter, and John. What eventually became of this earliest Christ-following community remains unclear; they were possibly displaced, relocated, or killed when the Romans destroyed Jerusalem in 70 AD.

Meanwhile, as the message about Jesus spread beyond Judea and Galilee into the broader Greco-Roman world, it increasingly attracted Gentile adherents, especially among "God-fearers," non-Jews who were attracted to Judaism and participated in synagogal worship without fully converting. This created a challenge for the movement's Jewish religious outlook, which insisted on close observance of the Jewish commandments. Against this backdrop, Paul the Apostle, a Jew of the Pharisaic school who had initially persecuted the Jesus movement, became one of its most influential missionaries following his conversion, focusing on spreading the message to non-Jews in the Eastern Mediterranean.

Paul argued that Gentiles could participate in the promises of Israel through exclusive devotion to the God of Israel, faith in Christ, baptism, and participation in his death and resurrection without full adherence to the Torah, including circumcision. This had a formative effect on the emerging Christian identity as separate from Judaism. Over time, such developments contributed to the gradual differentiation between the Jesus movement and other Jewish communities, a process that resulted in the emergence of Christianity as a separate religion.

=== Jerusalem ekklēsia ===
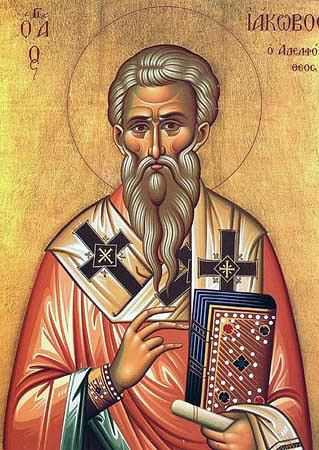
James the Just, whose judgement was adopted in the apostolic decree of Acts 15:19–29, as depicted in a Neo-Byzantine icon.

The New Testament's Acts of the Apostles and Epistle to the Galatians record that an early Jewish Christian community (Note: Hurtado: "She refrains from referring to this earliest stage of the "Jesus-community" as early "Christianity" and comprisedof "churches," as the terms carry baggage of later developments of "organized institutions, and of a religion separate from, different from, and hostile to Judaism" (185). So, instead, she renders ekklēsia as "assembly" (quite appropriately in my view, reflecting the quasi-official connotation of the term, often both in the LXX and in wider usage).") centered on Jerusalem, and that its leaders included Peter, James, the brother of Jesus, and John the Apostle. The Jerusalem community "held a central place among all the churches," as witnessed by Paul's writings. Reportedly legitimised by Jesus' appearance, Peter was the first leader of the Jerusalem ekklēsia.

Peter was soon eclipsed in this leadership by James the Just, "the Brother of the Lord," which may explain why the early texts contain scant information about Peter. According to Lüdemann, in the discussions about the strictness of adherence to the Jewish Law, the more conservative faction of James the Just gained the upper hand over the more liberal position of Peter, who soon lost influence. According to Dunn, this was not an "usurpation of power," but a consequence of Peter's involvement in missionary activities. The relatives of Jesus were generally accorded a special position within this community, which also contributed to the ascendancy of James the Just in Jerusalem.

According to a tradition recorded by Eusebius and Epiphanius of Salamis, the Jerusalem church fled to Pella at the outbreak of the First Jewish–Roman War (AD 66–73).

The Jerusalem community consisted of "Hebrews," Jews speaking both Aramaic and Greek, and "Hellenists," Jews speaking only Greek, possibly diaspora Jews who had resettled in Jerusalem. According to Dunn, Paul's initial persecution of Christians probably was directed against these Greek-speaking "Hellenists" due to their anti-Temple attitude. Within the early Jewish Christian community, this also set them apart from the "Hebrews" and their Tabernacle observance.

=== Beliefs and practices ===
==== Creeds and salvation ====
The sources for the beliefs of the apostolic community include oral traditions (which included sayings attributed to Jesus, parables and teachings), the Gospels, and the New Testament epistles. Recent scholarship is increasingly skeptical of positing hypothetical sources.

The texts contain the earliest Christian creeds expressing belief in the resurrected Jesus, such as 1 Corinthians 15:3–41:

[3] For I handed on to you as of first importance what I in turn had received: that Christ died for our sins in accordance with the scriptures, [4] and that he was buried, and that he was raised on the third day in accordance with the scriptures, (Note: See Why was Resurrection on "the Third Day"? Two Insights for explanations on the phrase "third day." According to Pinchas Lapide, "third day" may refer to Hosea 6:1–2: "Come, let us return to the Lord; for he has torn us, that he may heal us; he has struck us down, and he will bind us up. After two days he will revive us; on the third day he will raise us up, that we may live before him." See also 2 Kings 20:8: "Hezekiah said to Isaiah, 'What shall be the sign that the Lord will heal me, and that I shall go up to the house of the Lord on the third day?'") [5] and that he appeared to Cephas, then to the twelve. [6] Then he appeared to more than five hundred brothers and sisters at one time, most of whom are still alive, though some have died. [7] Then he appeared to James, then to all the apostles.

The creed has been dated by some scholars as originating within the Jerusalem apostolic community no later than the 40s, and by some to less than a decade after Jesus' death, while others date it to about 56. Other early creeds include 1 John 4 (1 John 4:2), 2 Timothy 2 (2 Timothy 2:8), Romans 1 (Romans 1:3–4) and 1 Timothy 3 (1 Timothy 3:16).

==== Christology ====
Two fundamentally different Christologies developed in the early Church, namely a "low" or adoptionist Christology, and a "high" or "incarnation Christology." The chronology of the development of these early Christologies is a matter of debate within contemporary scholarship. (Note: Larry Hurtado, The Origin of "Divine Christology"?)

The "low Christology" or "adoptionist Christology" is the belief "that God exalted Jesus to be his Son by raising him from the dead," thereby raising him to "divine status." According to the "evolutionary model" c.q. "evolutionary theories," the Christological understanding of Christ developed over time, as witnessed in the Gospels, with the earliest Christians believing that Jesus was a human who was exalted, c.q. adopted as God's Son, when he was resurrected.

Later beliefs shifted the exaltation to his baptism, birth, and subsequently to the idea of his eternal existence, as witnessed in the Gospel of John. This evolutionary model, begun by the history of religious school, was very influential, and the "low Christology" was regarded as the oldest throughout much of the twentieth century. (Note: Ehrman: * "The earliest Christians held exaltation Christologies in which the human being Jesus was made the Son of God—for example, at his resurrection or at his baptism—as we examined in the previous chapter." * Here I'll say something about the oldest Christology, as I understand it. This was what I earlier called a "low" Christology. I may end up in the book describing it as a "Christology from below" or possibly an "exaltation" Christology. Or maybe I'll call it all three things [...] Along with lots of other scholars, I think this was indeed the earliest Christology. (Note: Bart Ehrman (6 Feb. 2013), The Earliest Christology))

The other early Christology is "high Christology," which is "the view that Jesus was a pre-existent divine being who became a human, did the Father's will on earth, and then was taken back up into heaven whence he had originally come" and appeared on earth. According to Hurtado, a proponent of an Early High Christology, the devotion to Jesus as divine originated in early Jewish Christianity and not later or under the influence of pagan religions and Gentile converts. The Pauline letters, which are the earliest Christian writings, already show "a well-developed pattern of Christian devotion [...] already conventionalized and apparently uncontroversial."

Some Christians began to worship Jesus as Lord.

==== Eschatological expectations ====
Many scholars argue that a conditional understanding of eschatology is present in the gospels, with the date of the parousia being dependent on repentance rather than being fixed. While Jesus' early followers expected the installment of the Kingdom of God, its nonarrival was understood to be the result of a lack of repentance by Israel. (Note: Bart Ehrman (June 4, 2016), Were Jesus' Followers Crazy? Was He?) Paula Fredriksen argues that the earliest Christians believed in the imminent arrival of the Parousia and sought to spread this message throughout Israel and the Jewish diaspora. Jesus' resurrection signaling the Kingdom of God changed into a belief in immediate reward in heaven after death, the confirmation of the Messianic status of Jesus, and a Second Coming, heralding the expected endtime. Ferda argues that the historical Jesus predicted his death and second return after a period of absence.

==== Angels and Devils ====
Coming from a Jewish background, early Christians believed in angels (derived from the Greek word for "messengers"). Specifically, early Christians wrote in the New Testament books that angels "heralded Jesus' birth, Resurrection, and Ascension; ministered to Him while He was on Earth; and sing the praises of God through all eternity." Early Christians also believed that protecting angels—assigned to each nation and even to each individual—would herald the Second Coming, lead the saints into Paradise, and cast the damned into Hell." Satan ("the adversary"), similar to descriptions in the Old Testament, appears in the New Testament "to accuse men of sin and to test their fidelity, even to the point of tempting Jesus."

=== Practices ===
The Book of Acts reports that the early followers continued daily Temple attendance and traditional Jewish home prayer, the Jewish liturgy, a set of scriptural readings adapted from synagogue practice, and the use of sacred music in hymns and prayer. Other passages in the New Testament gospels reflect a similar observance of traditional Jewish piety such as baptism, fasting, reverence for the Torah, and observance of Jewish holy days.

==== Baptism ====
Early Christian beliefs regarding baptism probably predate the New Testament writings. It seems certain that numerous Jewish sects and certainly Jesus's disciples practised baptism. John the Baptist had baptized many people, before baptisms took place in the name of Jesus Christ. Paul likened baptism to being buried with Christ in his death. (Note: Romans 6:3–4; Colossians 2:12)

==== Lovefeast and Eucharist ====
Early Christian rituals included communal meals known as the Lovefeast (Agape feast). The Eucharist was often a part of the Lovefeast, but between the latter part of the 1st century AD and 250 AD the two became separate rituals. Thus, in modern times the Lovefeast refers to a Christian ritual meal distinct from the Lord's Supper.

==== Holy Kiss ====
Instituted in the New Testament, in the early Church, "the verbal exchange of 'peace' with a kiss appears to be a Christian innovation, there being no clear example in pre-Christian literature." The Holy Kiss was thus followed as a Christian teaching, not a cultural practice. The early Christian apologist Tertullian wrote that before leaving a house, Christians are to give the Holy Kiss and say "peace to this house." In early Christianity, "the kiss was shared in conjunction with the benedictions at the conclusion of worship services" though it soon "became associated with the Eucharist" and thus "its location during the worship service moved forward in time to the celebration of Communion." The Holy Kiss was seen as an essential part of preparing to partaking in the Eucharist:

Peace, reconciliation, and unity were the very essence of the church's life; without them communion would have been a sham. Bestowed by the Spirit and experienced in prayer, their liturgical expression—which pointed forward to the eucharist—was the holy kiss.

For the early Christians, the Holy Kiss "was associated with the peace and unity given by the Holy Spirit to the congregation." To guard against any abuse of this form of salutation, women and men were required to sit separately, and the kiss of peace was given only by women to women and by men to men, with closed mouths. Apostolic Tradition specified with regard to catechumens: "When they have prayed they shall not give the kiss of peace for their kiss is not yet holy" (18:3). As such, the Holy Kiss was distinguished as a ritual only to be partaken of by baptized Christians, with catechumens and non-Christians not being greeted this way (18:4).

==== Headcovering ====
Christianity in the 1st century continued the practice of female Christian headcovering (from the age of puberty onward), with early Christian apologist Tertullian referencing 1 Corinthians 11:2–10 and stating, "So, too, did the Corinthians themselves understand [Paul]. In fact, at this day the Corinthians do veil their virgins. What the apostles taught, their disciples approve." Hippolytus of Rome specified the type of veil: "And let all the women have their heads covered with an opaque cloth, not with a veil of thin linen, for this is not a true covering."

==== Footwashing ====
The early Christian apologist Tertullian recorded that footwashing was a regular part of early Christian worship. Footwashing was done with a basin "of water for the saints' feet" and a "linen towel." Being commanded in John 13, footwashing done in the imitation of Jesus was a rite encouraged by Origen. The early Church Father Clement of Alexandria linked the new sandals given to the Prodigal Son with feetwashing and described "non-perishable shoes that are only fit to be worn by those who have had their feet washed by Jesus, the Teacher and Lord." The early Church thus saw footwashing to be connected to repentance, involving a spiritual cleansing by Jesus.

==== Liturgy ====
During the first three centuries of Christianity, the Liturgical ritual was rooted in the Jewish Passover, Siddur, Seder, and synagogue services, including the singing of hymns (especially the Psalms) and reading from the scriptures. Most early Christians did not own a copy of the works (some of which were still being written) that later became the Christian Bible or other church works accepted by some but not canonized, such as the writings of the Apostolic Fathers, or other works today called New Testament apocrypha. Similar to Judaism, much of the original church liturgical services functioned as a means of learning these scriptures, which initially centered around the Septuagint and the Targums.

At first, Christians continued to worship alongside Jewish believers, but within twenty years of Jesus' death, Sunday (the Lord's Day) was being regarded as the primary day of worship.

== Emerging church – mission to the Gentiles ==
With the start of their missionary activity, early Jewish Christians also started to attract proselytes, Gentiles who were fully or partly converted to Judaism. (Note: Catholic Encyclopedia: Proselyte: "The English term "proselyte" occurs only in the New Testament where it signifies a convert to the Jewish religion (Matthew 23:15; Acts 2:11; 6:5; etc.), though the same Greek word is commonly used in the Septuagint to designate a foreigner living in Judea. The term seems to have passed from an original local and chiefly political sense, in which it was used as early as 300 BC, to a technical and religious meaning in the Judaism of the New Testament epoch.") While the ministry of the Historical Jesus was largely aimed at the rural people of Israel, he was not hostile to gentiles; early missionary efforts towards them would be unexpected had Jesus entirely rejected them.

=== Growth of early Christianity ===
Christian missionary activity spread "the Way" and slowly created early centers of Christianity with Gentile adherents in the predominantly Greek-speaking eastern half of the Roman Empire, and then throughout the Hellenistic world and even beyond the Roman Empire. (Note: Ecclesiastical historian Henry Hart Milman writes that in much of the first three centuries, even in the Latin-dominated western empire: "the Church of Rome, and most, if not all the Churches of the West, were, if we may so speak, Greek religious colonies [see Greek colonies for the background]. Their language was Greek, their organization Greek, their writers Greek, their scriptures Greek; and many vestiges and traditions show that their ritual, their Liturgy, was Greek.") Early Christian beliefs were proclaimed in kerygma (preaching), some of which are preserved in New Testament scripture. The early Gospel message spread orally, probably originally in Aramaic, but almost immediately also in Greek.

The scope of the Jewish-Christian mission expanded over time. While Jesus limited his message to a Jewish audience in Galilee and Judea, his followers after his death extended their outreach to all of Israel and eventually the whole Jewish diaspora since they that the Second Coming would happen only when all Jews had received the Gospel. Apostles and preachers traveled to Jewish communities around the Mediterranean Sea and initially attracted Jewish converts.

Within 10 years of the death of Jesus, apostles had attracted enthusiasts for "the Way" from Jerusalem to Antioch, Ephesus, Corinth, Thessalonica, Cyprus, Crete, Alexandria, and Rome. Over 40 churches had been established by 100, mostly in Asia Minor, such as the seven churches of Asia, and some in Greece and Italy.

According to Fredriksen, when early Christians broadened their missionary efforts, they also came into contact with Gentiles attracted to the Jewish religion. Eventually, the Gentiles came to be included in the missionary effort of Hellenised Jews, bringing "all nations" into the house of God. The "Hellenists," Greek-speaking diaspora Jews belonging to early Jerusalem's Jesus movement, played an important role in reaching a Gentile, Greek audience, notably at Antioch, which had a large Jewish community and significant numbers of Gentile "God-fearers."

From Antioch, the mission to the Gentiles started, including Paus, which would fundamentally change the character of the early Christian movement, eventually turning it into a new, Gentile religion. According to Dunn, within 10 years after Jesus' death, "the new messianic movement focused on Jesus began to modulate into something different ... it was at Antioch that we can begin to speak of the new movement as 'Christianity'."

Christian groups and congregations first organized themselves loosely. In Paul's time there were no precisely delineated territorial jurisdictions for bishops, elders, and deacons. (Note: Despite its mention of bishops, there is no clear evidence in the New Testament that supports the concepts of dioceses and monepiscopacy, i.e. the rule that all the churches in a geographic area should be ruled by a single bishop. According to Ronald Y. K. Fung, scholars point to evidence that Christian communities such as Rome had many bishops, and that the concept of monepiscopacy was still emerging when Ignatius was urging his tri-partite structure on other churches.)

=== Paul and the inclusion of Gentiles ===
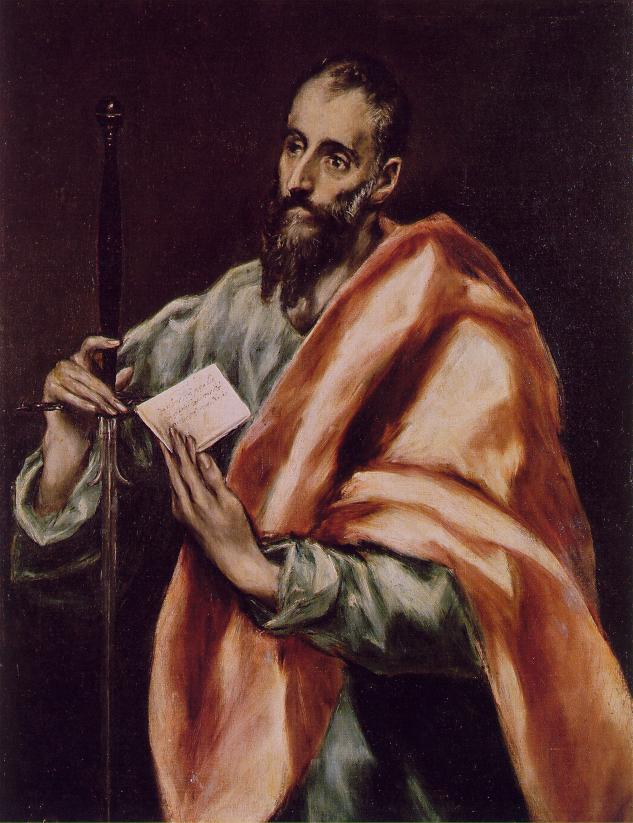
Saint Paul, by El Greco

==== Conversion ====
Paul's influence on Christian thinking is said to be more significant than that of any other New Testament author. According to the New Testament, Saul of Tarsus first persecuted the early Jewish Christians, but then converted. He adopted the name Paul and started proselytizing among the Gentiles, calling himself "Apostle to the Gentiles."

Paul was in contact with the early Christian community in Jerusalem, led by James the Just. According to Mack, he may have been converted to another early strand of Christianity, with a High Christology. Fragments of their beliefs in an exalted and deified Jesus, what Mack called the "Christ cult," can be found in the writings of Paul. (Note: According to Mack, "Paul was converted to a Hellenized form of some Jesus movement that had already developed into a Christ cult. [...] Thus his letters serve as documentation for the Christ cult as well.") Yet, Hurtado notes that Paul valued the linkage with "Jewish Christian circles in Roman Judea," which makes it likely that his Christology was in line with, and indebted to, their views. Hurtado further notes that "[i]t is widely accepted that the tradition that Paul recites in 1 Corinthians 15:1–7 must go back to the Jerusalem Church."

==== Inclusion of Gentiles ====
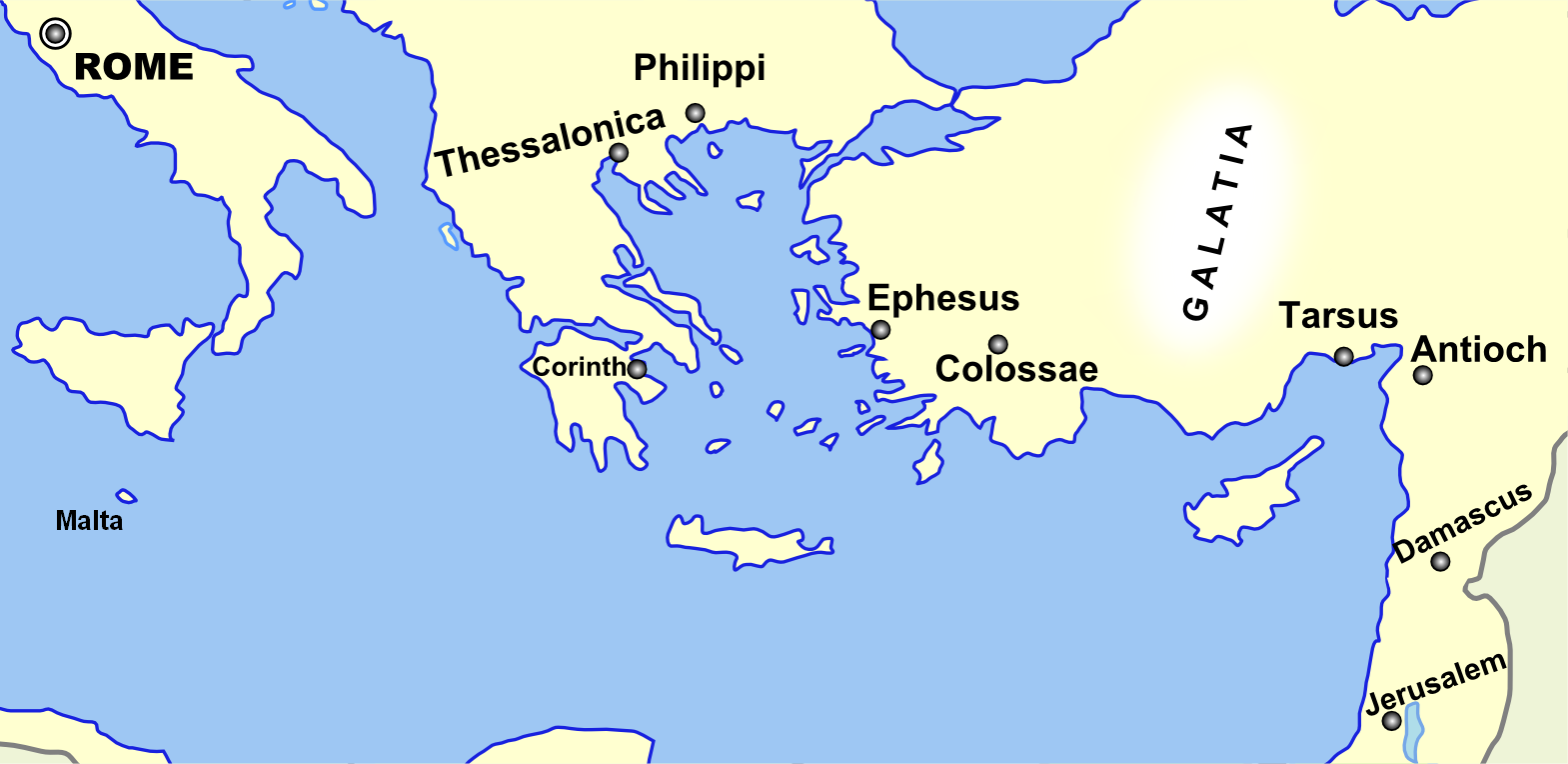
Mediterranean geography relevant to Paul's life, from Jerusalem in the lower right to Rome in the upper left.

Paul was responsible for bringing Christianity to Ephesus, Corinth, Philippi, and Thessalonica. According to Larry Hurtado, "Paul saw Jesus' resurrection as ushering in the eschatological time foretold by biblical prophets in which the pagan 'Gentile' nations would turn from their idols and embrace the one true God of Israel (e.g., Zechariah 8:20–23), and Paul saw himself as specially called by God to declare God's eschatological acceptance of the Gentiles and summon them to turn to God."

According to Krister Stendahl, the main concern of Paul's writings on Jesus' role and salvation by faith is not the individual conscience of human sinners and their doubts about being chosen by God or not, but the main concern is the problem of the inclusion of Gentile (Greek) Torah-observers into God's covenant. (Note: Stephen Westerholm (2015), The New Perspective on Paul in Review, Direction, Spring 2015 · Vol. 44 No. 1 · pp. 4–15) The inclusion of Gentiles into early Christianity posed a problem for the Jewish identity of some of the early Christians: the new Gentile converts were not required to be circumcised nor to observe the Mosaic Law.

Circumcision in particular was regarded as a token of the membership of the Abrahamic covenant, and the most traditionalist faction of Jewish Christians (i.e., converted Pharisees) insisted that Gentile converts had to be circumcised as well. By contrast, the rite of circumcision was considered execrable and repulsive during the period of Hellenization of the Eastern Mediterranean, and was especially adversed in Classical civilization both from ancient Greeks and Romans, which instead valued the foreskin positively. Some people who were circumcised would wear a kynodesme or undertake epispasm, the historical term for foreskin restoration.

Paul objected strongly to the insistence on keeping all of the Jewish commandments, considering it a great threat to his doctrine of salvation through faith in Christ. According to Paula Fredriksen, Paul's opposition to male circumcison for Gentiles is in line with the Old Testament predictions that "in the last days the gentile nations would come to the God of Israel, as gentiles (e.g., Zechariah 8:20–23), not as proselytes to Israel." For Paul, Gentile male circumcision was therefore an affront to God's intentions. According to Larry Hurtado, "Paul saw himself as what [Johannes] Munck called a salvation-historical figure in his own rightin his own right," who was "personally and singularly deputized by God to bring about the predicted ingathering (the "fullness") of the nations (Romans 11:25)."

For Paul, Jesus' death and resurrection solved the problem of the exclusion of Gentiles from God's covenant, since the faithful are redeemed by participation in Jesus' death and rising. In the Jerusalem ekklēsia, from which Paul received the creed of 1 Corinthians 15:1–7, the phrase "died for our sins" probably was an apologetic rationale for the death of Jesus as being part of God's plan and purpose, as evidenced in the Scriptures. For Paul, it gained a deeper significance, providing "a basis for the salvation of sinful Gentiles apart from the Torah."

According to E. P. Sanders, Paul argued that "those who are baptized into Christ are baptized into his death, and thus they escape the power of sin [...] he died so that the believers may die with him and consequently live with him." (Note: E.P. Sanders, Saint Paul, the Apostle, Encyclopedia Britannica) By this participation in Christ's death and rising, "one receives forgiveness for past offences, is liberated from the powers of sin, and receives the Spirit."

Paul insists that salvation is received by the grace of God. According to Sanders, this insistence is in line with Second Temple Judaism of c. 200 BC to 200 AD, which saw God's covenant with Israel as an act of grace of God. Observance of the Law is needed to maintain the covenant, but the covenant is not earned by observing the Law but by the grace of God. (Note: Jordan Cooper, E.P. Sanders and the New Perspective on Paul)

These divergent interpretations have a prominent place in both Paul's writings and in Acts. According to Galatians 2:1–10 and Acts chapter 15, 14 years after his conversion Paul visited the "Pillars of Jerusalem," the leaders of the Jerusalem ekklēsia. His purpose was to compare his Gospel with theirs, an event known as the Council of Jerusalem. According to Paul, in his letter to the Galatians, (Note: Four years after the Council of Jerusalem, Paul wrote to the Galatians about the issue, which had become a serious controversy in their region. There was a burgeoning movement of Judaizers in the area that advocated adherence to the Mosaic Law, including circumcision. According to McGrath, Paul identified James the Just as the motivating force behind the Judaizing movement. Paul considered it a great threat to his doctrine of salvation through faith and addressed the issue with great detail in Galatians 3.) they agreed that his mission was to be among the Gentiles. According to Acts, Paul made an argument that circumcision was not a necessary practice, vocally supported by Peter. (Note: According to 19th-century German theologian F. C. Baur early Christianity was dominated by the conflict between Peter who was law-observant, and Paul who advocated partial or even complete freedom from the Law. Scholar James D. G. Dunn has proposed that Peter was the "bridge-man" between the two other prominent leaders: Paul and James the Just. Paul and James were both heavily identified with their own "brands" of Christianity. Peter showed a desire to hold on to his Jewish identity, in contrast with Paul. He simultaneously showed a flexibility towards the desires of the broader Christian community, in contrast to James. Marcion and his followers stated that the polemic against false apostles in Galatians was aimed at Peter, James and John, the "Pillars of the Church", as well as the "false" gospels circulating through the churches at the time. Irenaeus and Tertullian argued against Marcionism's elevation of Paul and stated that Peter and Paul were equals among the apostles. Passages from Galatians were used to show that Paul respected Peter's office and acknowledged a shared faith.)

While the Council of Jerusalem was described as resulting in an agreement to allow Gentile converts exemption from most Jewish commandments, in reality a stark opposition from "Hebrew" Jewish Christians remained, as exemplified by the Ebionites. The relaxing of requirements in Pauline Christianity opened the way for a much larger Christian Church, extending far beyond the Jewish community. The inclusion of Gentiles is reflected in Luke-Acts, which is an attempt to answer a theological problem, namely how the Messiah of the Jews came to have an overwhelmingly non-Jewish church; the answer it provides, and its central theme, is that the message of Christ was sent to the Gentiles because the Jews rejected it.

== Persecutions ==
Persecution of Christians in the Roman Empire occurred frequently over a period of over two centuries. For most of the first three hundred years of Christian history, Christians had to hide their faith, practice their beliefs in secret, and rise to positions of responsibility to avoid being killed. Persecutions took place as the result of the state authorizing others in power to take action against the Christians in their midst, who were thought to bring misfortune by their refusal to honour the gods and challenge the infrastructure of an imperialist empire.

For only approximately ten of the first 300 years of the church's history were Christians executed by orders from a Roman emperor. The first persecution of Christians organised by the Roman government took place under Emperor Nero in 64 AD after the Great Fire of Rome. There was no empire-wide persecution of Christians until the reign of Decius, in the 3rd century. (Note: Martin, D. 2010. "The 'Afterlife' of the New Testament and Postmodern Interpretation" (lecture transcript). Yale University.) The Edict of Serdica was issued in 311 by the Roman emperor Galerius, officially ending the Diocletianic persecution of Christianity in the East. With the passage in 313 AD of the Edict of Milan, in which the Roman Emperors Constantine the Great and Licinius legalised the Christian religion, persecution of Christians by the Roman state ceased.

== Development of the Biblical canon ==
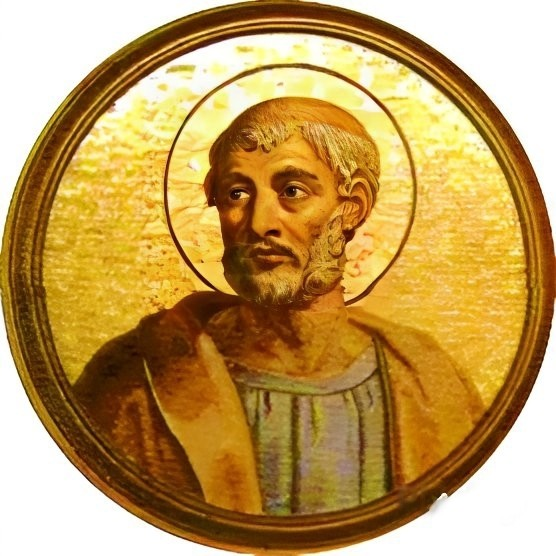
An artistic representation of St. Clement I, an Apostolic Father.

In an ancient culture before the printing press and with the majority of the population illiterate, most early Christians likely did not own any Christian texts. Much of the original church liturgical services functioned as a means of learning Christian theology. A final uniformity of liturgical services may have become solidified after the church established a Biblical canon, possibly based on the Apostolic Constitutions and Clementine literature.

Clement (d. 99) wrote that liturgies are "to be celebrated, and not carelessly nor in disorder" but the final uniformity of liturgical services came only later, though the Liturgy of St James is traditionally associated with James the Just.

Books not accepted by Pauline Christianity are termed biblical apocrypha though the exact list varies from denomination to denomination.

=== Old Testament ===
The Biblical canon began with the Jewish Scriptures. The Koine Greek translation of the Jewish scriptures, later known as the Septuagint and often written as "LXX," was the dominant translation from very early on.

Perhaps the earliest Christian canon is the Bryennios List, dated to c. 100, which was found by Philotheos Bryennios in the Codex Hierosolymitanus. The list is written in Koine Greek, Aramaic and Hebrew. In the 2nd century, Melito of Sardis called the Jewish scriptures the "Old Testament" and also specified an early canon.

Jerome (347–420) expressed his preference for adhering strictly to the Hebrew text and canon, but his view held little currency even in his own day.

=== New Testament ===
The New Testament (often compared to the New Covenant) is the second major division of the Christian Bible. The books of the canon of the New Testament include the Canonical Gospels, Acts, letters of the Apostles, and Revelation. The original texts were written by various authors, most likely sometime between c. AD 45 and 120 AD, in Koine Greek, the lingua franca of the eastern part of the Roman Empire, though there is also a minority argument for Aramaic primacy. They were not defined as "canon" until the 4th century. Some were disputed, known as the Antilegomena. Eusebius saw some of the unacceptable books as being either ‘Antilegomena’ (unworthy) or ‘absurd’.

Writings attributed to the Apostles circulated among the earliest Christian communities. The Pauline epistles were circulating, perhaps in collected forms, by the end of the 1st century AD. (Note: Three forms are postulated, from Gamble, Harry Y, "18", The Canon Debate, p. 300, note 21, "(1) Marcion's collection that begins with Galatians and ends with Philemon; (2) Papyrus 46, dated about 200, that follows the order that became established except for reversing Ephesians and Galatians; and (3) the letters to seven churches, treating those to the same church as one letter and basing the order on length, so that Corinthians is first and Colossians (perhaps including Philemon) is last.")

== Early orthodox writings – Apostolic Fathers ==
The Church Fathers are the early and influential Christian theologians and writers, particularly those of the first five centuries of Christian history. The earliest Church Fathers, within two generations of the Twelve Apostles of Christ, are usually called Apostolic Fathers for reportedly knowing and studying under the apostles personally. Important Apostolic Fathers include Clement of Rome (d. AD 99), Ignatius of Antioch (d. AD 98 to 117) and Polycarp of Smyrna (AD 69–155).

The earliest Christian writings, other than those collected in the New Testament, are a group of letters credited to the Apostolic Fathers. Their writings include the Epistle of Barnabas and the Epistles of Clement. The Didache is usually placed among the writings of the Apostolic Fathers, although their authors are unknown.

Taken as a whole, the collection is notable for its literary simplicity, religious zeal and lack of Hellenistic philosophy or rhetoric. They contain early thoughts on the organisation of the Christian ekklēsia, and are historical sources for the development of an early Church structure.

In his letter 1 Clement, Clement of Rome calls on the Christians of Corinth to maintain harmony and order. Some see his epistle as an assertion of Rome's authority over the church in Corinth and, by implication, the beginnings of papal supremacy. Clement refers to the leaders of the Corinthian church in his letter as bishops and presbyters interchangeably, and likewise states that the bishops are to lead God's flock by virtue of the chief shepherd (presbyter), Jesus Christ.

Ignatius of Antioch advocated the authority of the apostolic episcopacy (bishops).

The Didache (late 1st century) is an anonymous Jewish-Christian work. It is a pastoral manual dealing with Christian lessons, rituals, and Church organization, parts of which may have constituted the first written catechism, "that reveals more about how Jewish-Christians saw themselves and how they adapted their Judaism for Gentiles than any other book in the Christian Scriptures."

== Split of early Christianity and Judaism ==
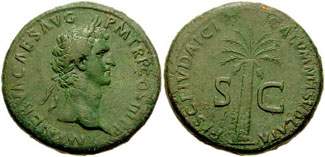
A coin issued by Nerva reads fisci Judaici calumnia sublata, "abolition of malicious prosecution in connection with the Jewish tax"

=== Split with Judaism ===
There was a slowly growing chasm between Gentile Christians, and Jews and Jewish Christians, rather than a sudden split. Even though Paul is commonly thought to have established a Gentile church, it took a century for a complete break to manifest. Growing tensions led to a starker separation that was virtually complete when Jewish Christians refused to join in the Bar Kokhba Jewish revolt of 132. Certain events are perceived as pivotal in the growing rift between Christianity and Judaism.

The destruction of Jerusalem and the consequent dispersion of Jews and Jewish Christians from the city (after the Bar Kokhba revolt) ended any pre-eminence of the Jewish-Christian leadership in Jerusalem. Early Christianity grew further apart from Judaism to establish itself as a predominantly Gentile religion, and Antioch became the first Gentile Christian community with stature.

The hypothetical Council of Jamnia c. 85 is often stated to have condemned all who claimed the Messiah had already come, and Christianity in particular, excluding them from attending synagogue. However, the formulated prayer in question (birkat ha-minim) is considered by other scholars to be unremarkable in the history of Jewish and Christian relations. There is a scarcity of evidence for Jewish persecution of "heretics" in general, or Christians in particular, in the period between 70 and 135.

It is probable that the condemnation of Jamnia included many groups, of which the Christians were but one, and did not necessarily mean excommunication. That some of the later church fathers recommended only against synagogue attendance makes it improbable that an anti-Christian prayer was a common part of the synagogue liturgy. Jewish Christians continued to worship in synagogues for centuries.

During the late 1st century, Judaism was a legal religion with the protection of Roman law, worked out in compromise with the Roman state over two centuries (see Anti-Judaism in the Roman Empire for details). In contrast, Christianity was not legalized until the 313 Edict of Milan. Observant Jews had special rights, including the privilege of abstaining from civic pagan rites. Christians were initially identified with the Jewish religion by the Romans, but as they became more distinct, Christianity became a problem for Roman rulers. Around the year 98, the emperor Nerva decreed that Christians did not have to pay the annual tax upon the Jews, effectively recognizing them as distinct from Rabbinic Judaism. This opened the way to Christians being persecuted for disobedience to the emperor, as they refused to worship the state pantheon.

From c. 98 onwards a distinction between Christians and Jews in Roman literature becomes apparent. For example, Pliny the Younger postulates that Christians are not Jews since they do not pay the tax, in his letters to Trajan.

=== Later rejection of Jewish Christianity ===
Jewish Christians constituted a separate community from the Pauline Christians but maintained a similar faith. In Christian circles, Nazarene later came to be used as a label for those faithful to Jewish Law, in particular for a certain sect. These Jewish Christians, originally the central group in Christianity, generally holding the same beliefs except in their adherence to Jewish law, were not deemed heretical until the dominance of orthodoxy in the 4th century.

The Ebionites may have been a splinter group of Nazarenes, with disagreements over Christology and leadership. They were considered by Gentile Christians to have unorthodox beliefs, particularly in relation to their views of Christ and Gentile converts. After the condemnation of the Nazarenes, Ebionite was often used as a general pejorative for all related "heresies."

There was a post-Nicene "double rejection" of the Jewish Christians by both Gentile Christianity and Rabbinic Judaism. The true end of ancient Jewish Christianity occurred only in the 5th century. Gentile Christianity became the dominant strand of orthodoxy and imposed itself on the previously Jewish Christian sanctuaries, taking full control of those houses of worship by the end of the 5th century. (Note: Jewish Virtual Library: "A major difficulty in tracing the growth of Christianity from its beginnings as a Jewish messianic sect, and its relations to the various other normative-Jewish, sectarian-Jewish, and Christian-Jewish groups is presented by the fact that what ultimately became normative Christianity was originally but one among various contending Christian trends. Once the "gentile Christian" trend won out, and the teaching of Paul became accepted as expressing the doctrine of the Church, the Jewish Christian groups were pushed to the margin and ultimately excluded as heretical. Being rejected both by normative Judaism and the Church, they ultimately disappeared. Nevertheless, several Jewish Christian sects (such as the Nazarenes, Ebionites, Elchasaites, and others) existed for some time, and a few of them seem to have endured for several centuries. Some sects saw in Jesus mainly a prophet and not the "Christ," others seem to have believed in him as the Messiah, but did not draw the christological and other conclusions that subsequently became fundamental in the teaching of the Church (the divinity of the Christ, trinitarian conception of the Godhead, abrogation of the Law). After the disappearance of the early Jewish Christian sects and the triumph of gentile Christianity, to become a Christian meant, for a Jew, to apostatize and to leave the Jewish community.)

== Timeline ==
1st century timeline

Earliest dates must all be considered approximate

- 6 AD Judean King Herod Archelaus deposed by the Roman Emperor Augustus; Samaria, Judea, and Idumea annexed as Iudaea Province under direct Roman administration, capital at Caesarea, Quirinius became Legate (Governor) of Syria, conducted Census of Quirinius, opposed by the Zealots (JA18, Luke 2:1–3, Acts 5:37).
- c. 4 BC Jesus is born in Bethlehem, Judea (according to the Gospels of Luke and Matthew)
- 7–26 AD Brief period of peace, relatively free of revolt and bloodshed in Iudaea and Galilee
- 9 Pharisee leader Hillel the Elder dies, temporary rise of Shammai
- 14–37 Rule of the Roman Emperor Tiberius
- 18–36 Caiaphas, appointed High Priest of Herod's Temple by Prefect Valerius Gratus, deposed by Syrian Legate Lucius Vitellius
- 19 Jews, Jewish proselytes, astrologers expelled from Rome
- 26–36 Pontius Pilate, Prefect (governor) of Iudaea, recalled to Rome by Syrian Legate Vitellius on complaints of excess violence (JA18.4.2)
- 28 or 29 John the Baptist began his ministry in the "15th year of Tiberius" (Luke 3:1–2) (Matt 3:1–2)
- 30 – Great Commission of Jesus to go and make disciples of all nations;
- 30–36 Jesus is crucified on order of Pontius Pilate. Christians believe he rose from the dead 3 days later. Pentecost, a day in which 3000 Jews from a variety of Mediterranean-basin nations are converted to faith in Jesus Christ.
- 34 – Philip baptizes a convert in Gaza, an Ethiopian eunuch who was already a God-fearer.
- 39 – Peter preaches to a Gentile audience in the house of the Roman soldier Cornelius, who was already a God-fearer.
- 37–41 Crisis under Caligula
- 42 – Mark goes to Egypt
- 44? James the Great: According to ancient local tradition, on 2 January of the year AD 40, the Virgin Mary appeared to James on a Pillar on the bank of the Ebro River at Caesaraugusta, while he was preaching the Gospel in Hispania (modern-day Spain). Following that apparition, James returned to Judea, where he was beheaded by King Herod Agrippa I in the year 44 during a Passover (Nisan 15) (Acts 12:1–3).
- 44 Death of Herod Agrippa I (JA19.8.2, Acts 12:20–23)
- 44–46? Theudas beheaded by Procurator Cuspius Fadus for saying he would part the Jordan river (like Moses and the Red Sea or Joshua and the Jordan) (JA20.5.1, Acts 5:36–37 places it before the Census of Quirinius)
- 45–49? Mission of Barnabas and Paul (Acts 13:1–14:28) to the island of Cyprus, Pisidian Antioch, Iconium, Lystra, and Derbe (there they were called "gods ... in human form"), then return to Syrian Antioch. Map1
- 47? St. Thomas Christianity, now in several forms, is begun in India by Thomas.
- 47 – Paul (formerly known as Saul of Tarsus) begins his first missionary journey to Asia Minor (modern-day Turkey).
- 48–100 Herod Agrippa II appointed King of the Jews by Claudius, seventh and last of the Herodians
- 50 Passover riot in Jerusalem, 20–30,000 killed (JA20.5.3, JW2.12.1)
- 50 – Council of Jerusalem on admitting Gentiles into the Church
- 50? Council of Jerusalem and the "Apostolic Decree", Acts 15:1–35, same as Galatians 2:1–10?, which is followed by the "Incident at Antioch", at which Paul publicly accused Peter of "Judaizing" towards the Gentiles (2:11–21)
- 51 – Paul begins his second missionary journey, a trip that takes him through Asia Minor (modern-day Turkey) and on into Greece
- 50–53? Paul's second mission (Acts 15:36–18:22), split with Barnabas, preaches the Gospel in Galatia, Phrygia, Macedonia, Philippi, Thessalonica, Berea, Athens, Corinth, "he had his hair cut off at Cenchrea because of a vow he had taken", then returns to Antioch; 1 Thessalonians, Galatians written? Map2
- 51–52 or 52–53 proconsulship of Gallio according to an inscription, only fixed date in chronology of Paul
- 52 – Thomas arrives in India and founds an early Christian church that subsequently split into the Syro-Malabar Catholic Church and the Malankara Church (and its various descendants)
- 54 – Paul begins his third missionary journey
- 53–57? Paul's third mission (Acts 18:23–22:30) to Galatia, Phrygia, Macedonia, Corinth, Ephesus, Greece, and Jerusalem, where James the Just challenged him about rumor of teaching antinomianism (21:21), he addressed a crowd in their language (most likely Aramaic); Romans, 1 Corinthians, 2 Corinthians, Philippians written? Map3
- 55? "Egyptian prophet" (allusion to Moses) and 30,000 unarmed Jews doing the Exodus reenactment massacred by Procurator Antonius Felix (JW2.13.5, JA20.8.6, Acts 21:38)
- 58? Paul arrested, accused of being a revolutionary, "ringleader of the sect of the Nazarenes", teaching resurrection of the dead, imprisoned in Caesarea (Acts 23–26)
- 59? Paul shipwrecked on the island of Malta, there he was called a god (Acts 28:6)
- 60 – Paul sent to Rome under Roman guard, evangelizes on Malta after shipwreck
- 60? Paul in Rome: greeted by many "brothers" (NRSV: "believers"), three days later called together the Jewish leaders, who had not received any word from Judea about him, but were curious about "this sect", which everywhere is spoken against; he tried to convince them from the "Law and Prophets", with partial success, said the Gentiles would listen and spent two years proclaiming the Kingdom of God and teaching the "Lord Jesus Christ" (Acts 28:15–31); Epistle to Philemon written?
- 62 James the Just stoned to death for law transgression by High Priest Ananus ben Artanus, popular opinion against act results in Ananus being deposed by new procurator Lucceius Albinus (JA20.9.1)
- 63–107? Simeon, 2nd Bishop of Jerusalem, crucified under Trajan
- 64–68 after 18 July Great Fire of Rome, Nero blamed and persecuted the Christians
- 64/67(?)–76/79(?) Pope Linus succeeds Peter as Episcopus Romanus ("Bishop of Rome")
- 65? Q document, a hypothetical Greek text thought by many critical scholars to have been used in writing of Matthew and Luke
- 66 – Thaddeus establishes the Christian church of Armenia
- 66–73 First Jewish–Roman War: destruction of Herod's Temple, Qumran community destroyed, site of Dead Sea Scrolls found in 1947
- 68–107? Ignatius, third Bishop of Antioch, fed to the lions in the Roman Colosseum, advocated the Bishop (Eph 6:1, Mag 2:1, 6:1, 7:1, 13:2, Tr 3:1, Smy 8:1, 9:1), rejected Sabbath on Saturday in favor of The Lord's Day (Sunday). (Mag 9.1), rejected Judaizing (Mag 10.3), first recorded use of the term "catholic" (Smy 8:2).
- 69 – Andrew is crucified in Patras on the Peloponnese peninsula of Greece
- 70(+/−10)? Gospel of Mark, written in Rome, by Peter's interpreter (1 Peter 5:13), original ending apparently lost, endings added c. 400, see Mark 16
- 70? Signs Gospel written, hypothetical Greek text used in Gospel of John to prove that Jesus is the Messiah
- 70–100? additional Pauline epistles
- 70–200? Didache; Other Gospels: Gospel of the Saviour, Gospel of Peter, Gospel of Thomas, Oxyrhynchus Gospels, Egerton Gospel, Fayyum Fragment, Dialogue of the Saviour; Jewish Christian Gospels: Gospel of the Ebionites, Gospel of the Hebrews, Gospel of the Nazarenes
- 76/79(?)–88 Pope Anacletus first Greek Pope, who succeeds Linus as Episcopus Romanus ("Bishop of Rome")
- 80 – First Christians reported in Tunisia and Gaul (modern-day France)
- 80(+/−20)? Gospel of Matthew, theoretically based on Mark and Q, most popular in early Christianity
- 80(+/−20)? Gospel of Luke, theoretically based on Mark and Q, also Acts of the Apostles by same author
- 88–101? Clement, fourth Episcopus Romanus ("Bishop of Rome"), wrote Letter of the Romans to the Corinthians (Apostolic Fathers)
- 90? Council of Jamnia of Judaism (disputed), Domitian applied the Fiscus Iudaicus tax even to those who merely "lived like Jews"
- 90(+/−10)? 1 Peter
- 94 "Testimonium Flavianum", disputed section of the Jewish Antiquities by Josephus in Aramaic, translated to Koine Greek
- 95(+/−30)? Gospel of John and Epistles of John
- 95(+/−10)? Book of Revelation written, by John (son of Zebedee) and/or a disciple of his
- 100(+/−30)? Epistle of Barnabas (Apostolic Fathers)
- 100(+/−25)? Epistle of James
- 100(+/−10)? Epistle of Jude written, probably by doubting relative of Jesus (Mark 6:3), rejected by some early Christians due to its reference to apocryphal Book of Enoch (v14), Epistle to the Hebrews written
- 100 – First Christians are reported in Monaco, Mauretania Caesariensis (modern-day Algeria), and the Anuradhapura Kingdom (modern-day Sri Lanka); a missionary goes to Arbela, old sacred city of the Assyrians.

== See also ==
- Christian martyrs
- Christian symbolism
- Christianity and Judaism
- Christianization
- Christianization of the Roman Empire as diffusion of innovation
- Chronological list of saints in the 1st century
- Classical antiquity
- Council of Jerusalem
- Early centers of Christianity
- Early Christian art and architecture
- Hellenistic Judaism
- History of Christian theology
- History of Christianity
- History of the Catholic Church
- History of the Eastern Orthodox Church
- Historiography of early Christianity
- Jesuism
- Mandaeism
- Persecution of Christians in the New Testament
- Persecution of Christians in the Roman Empire
- Spread of Christianity § Apostolic Age
- Synagogal Judaism
- Timeline of Christian missions
- Timeline of Christianity
- Timeline of the Catholic Church
- 1st century in religion

== Sources ==
=== Printed sources ===
- Barnett, Paul (2002). Jesus, the Rise of Early Christianity: A History of New Testament Times. InterVarsity Press. ISBN 0-8308-2699-8.
- Berard, Wayne Daniel (2006), When Christians Were Jews (That Is, Now), Cowley Publications, ISBN 1-56101-280-7
- Bermejo-Rubio, Fernando (2017). Feldt, Laura; Valk, Ülo (eds.). "The Process of Jesus' Deification and Cognitive Dissonance Theory". Numen. 64 (2–3). Leiden: Brill Publishers: 119–152. doi:10.1163/15685276-12341457. eISSN 1568-5276. ISSN 0029-5973. JSTOR 44505332. S2CID 148616605.
- Bird, Michael F. (2017), Jesus the Eternal Son: Answering Adoptionist Christology, Wim. B. Eerdmans Publishing
- Blomberg, Craig L. (1987), The Historical Reliability of the Gospels, Leicester, UK: Inter-Varsity Press, ISBN 9780877849926, OCLC 15415029, 2nd ed. 2007
- Boatwright, Mary Taliaferro; Gargola, Daniel J.; Talbert, Richard John Alexander (2004), The Romans: From Village to Empire, Oxford University Press, ISBN 0-19-511875-8
- Bokenkotter, Thomas (2004), A Concise History of the Catholic Church (Revised and expanded ed.), Doubleday, ISBN 0-385-50584-1
- Bond, Helen K. (2012). The Historical Jesus: A Guide for the Perplexed. Bloomsbury Academic. ISBN 9780567125101.
- Brown, Schuyler. The Origins of Christianity: A Historical Introduction to the New Testament. Oxford University Press (1993). ISBN 0-19-826207-8
- Boyarin, Daniel (2012). The Jewish Gospels: the Story of the Jewish Christ. The New Press. ISBN 978-1-59558-878-4.
- Bromiley, Geoffrey W., ed. (1979). International Standard Bible Encyclopedia: A-D. Vol. 1 (Fully Revised ed.). Grand Rapids, Michigan: Wm. B. Eerdmans Publishing Co. ISBN 0-8028-3781-6.
- Burkett, Delbert (2002), An Introduction to the New Testament and the Origins of Christianity, Cambridge University Press, ISBN 978-0-521-00720-7
- Chilton, Bruce; Evans, Craig A., eds. (2002). Authenticating the Activities of Jesus. BRILL. ISBN 978-0391041646.
- Cohen, Shaye J.D. (1987), From the Maccabees to the Mishnah, The Westminster Press, ISBN 0-664-25017-3
- Cox, Steven L.; Easley, Kendell H. (2007), Harmony of the Gospels, B&H Publishing, ISBN 978-0-8054-9444-0
- Craig, A. Evans (2001). Jesus and His Contemporaries: Comparative Studies. BRILL. ISBN 978-0391041189.
- Croix, G. E. M. de Sainte (1963). "Why Were The Early Christians Persecuted?". Past and Present (26): 6–38. doi:10.1093/past/26.1.6.
- Croix, G. E. M. de Sainte (2006), Whitby, Michael (ed.), Christian Persecution, Martyrdom, And Orthodoxy, Oxford: Oxford University Press, ISBN 0-19-927812-1
- Cross, F. L.; Livingstone, E. A., eds. (2005), The Oxford Dictionary of the Christian Church (3rd Revised ed.), Oxford: Oxford University Press, doi:10.1093/acref/9780192802903.001.0001, ISBN 978-0-19-280290-3
- Crossan, John Dominic (1995). Jesus: A Revolutionary Biography. HarperOne. ISBN 978-0-06-061662-5.
- Cullmann, Oscar (1949), The Earliest Christian Confessions, translated by J. K. S. Reid, London: Lutterworth
- Cullmann, Oscar (1966), A. J. B. Higgins (ed.), The Early Church: Studies in Early Christian History and Theology, Philadelphia: Westminster
- Cwiekowski, Frederick J. (1988), The Beginnings of the Church, Paulist Press
- Dauphin, C. (1993), "De l'Église de la circoncision à l'Église de la gentilité – sur une nouvelle voie hors de l'impasse", Studium Biblicum Franciscanum. Liber Annuus XLIII, archived from the original on 2013-03-09
- Davidson, Ivor (2005), The Birth of the Church: From Jesus to Constantine, AD 30-312, Oxford
- Davies, W. D. (1965), Paul and Rabbinic Judaism (2nd ed.), London
- Draper, JA (2006). "The Apostolic Fathers: the Didache". Expository Times. Vol. 117, no. 5.
- Duffy, Eamon (13 January 2015) [1997]. Saints and Sinners: A History of the Popes; Fourth Edition. Yale University Press. ISBN 978-0-300-20708-8.
- Dunn, James D. G. (1982), The New Perspective on Paul. Manson Memorial Lecture, 4 november 1982
- Dunn, James D. G. (1999), Jews and Christians: The Parting of the Ways, AD 70 to 135, Wm. B. Eerdmans Publishing, ISBN 0-8028-4498-7
- Dunn, James D. G. "The Canon Debate". In McDonald & Sanders (2002).
- Dunn, James D. G. (2003), Christianity in the Making: Jesus Remembered, vol. 1, Wm. B. Eerdmans Publishing, ISBN 978-0-8028-3931-2
- Dunn, James D. G. (2009), Christianity in the Making: Beginning from Jerusalem, vol. 2, Wm. B. Eerdmans Publishing, ISBN 978-0-8028-3932-9
- Dunn, James D. G. (Autumn 1993). "Echoes of Intra-Jewish Polemic in Paul's Letter to the Galatians". Journal of Biblical Literature. 112 (3). Society of Biblical Literature: 459–77. doi:10.2307/3267745. JSTOR 3267745.
- Eddy, Paul Rhodes; Boyd, Gregory A. (2007), The Jesus Legend: A Case for the Historical Reliability of the Synoptic Jesus Tradition, Baker Academic, ISBN 978-0-8010-3114-4
- Ehrman, Bart D. (1999). Jesus: Apocalyptic Prophet of the New Millennium. Oxford University Press. ISBN 978-0195124736.
- Ehrman, Bart D. (2003), Lost Christianities: The Battles for Scripture and the Faiths We Never Knew, Oxford: Oxford University Press, ISBN 978-0-19-972712-4, LCCN 2003053097
- Ehrman, Bart D. (2005) [2003]. "At Polar Ends of the Spectrum: Early Christian Ebionites and Marcionites". Lost Christianities: The Battles for Scripture and the Faiths We Never Knew. Oxford: Oxford University Pressvpages=95–112. ISBN 978-0-19-518249-1.
- Ehrman, Bart (2012), Did Jesus Exist?: The Historical Argument for Jesus of Nazareth, Harper Collins, ISBN 978-0-06-208994-6
- Ehrman, Bart (2014), How Jesus became God: The Exaltation of a Jewish Preacher from Galilee, Harper Collins
- Elwell, Walter; Comfort, Philip Wesley (2001), Tyndale Bible Dictionary, Tyndale House Publishers, ISBN 0-8423-7089-7
- Esler, Philip F. (2004), The Early Christian World, Routledge, ISBN 0-415-33312-1
- Finlan, Stephen (2004), The Background and Content of Paul's Cultic Atonement Metaphors, Society of Biblical Literature
- Franzen, August (1969). Dolan, John P. (ed.). A History of the Church. Translated by Becker, Peter (revised and edited ed.). New York: Herder and Herder.
- Franzen, August (1988), Kirchengeschichte
- Fredriksen, Paula (1999). Jesus of Nazareth, King of the Jews: A Jewish Life and the Emergence of Christianity. Vintage Books. ISBN 0-679-76746-0.
- Fredriksen, Paula (2018), When Christians Were Jews: The First Generation, New Haven and London: Yale University Press, ISBN 978-0-300-19051-9
- González, Justo L. (1987). A History of Christian Thought. Vol. 1: From the Beginnings to the Council of Chalcedon (revised ed.). Abingdon Press. ISBN 0-687-17182-2.
- González, Justo L. (2010). The Story of Christianity. Vol. 1 The Early Church to the Dawn of the Reformation (revised and updated ed.). HarperCollins. ISBN 9780061855887.
- Grant, M. (1977), Jesus: An Historian's Review of the Gospels, New York: Scribner's
- Gundry, R.H. (1976), Soma in Biblical Theology, Cambridge: Cambridge University Press
- Herbermann, Charles George (1913). The Catholic Encyclopedia. The Encycylopedia Press.
- Herzog, William R. (2005). Prophet and Teacher: An Introduction to the Historical Jesus. Westminster John Knox Press. ISBN 0664225284.
- Hunter, Archibald (1973), Works and Words of Jesus
- Hurtado, Larry W. (2004), Lord Jesus Christ: Devotion to Jesus in Earliest Christianity, Grand Rapids, Michigan and Cambridge, U.K.: Wm. B. Eerdmans, ISBN 978-0-8028-3167-5
- Hurtado, Larry W. (2005), How on Earth Did Jesus Become a God? Historical Questions about Earliest Devotion to Jesus, Grand Rapids, Michigan and Cambridge, U.K.: Wm. B. Eerdmans, ISBN 978-0-8028-2861-3
- Johnson, L.T., The Real Jesus, San Francisco, Harper San Francisco, 1996
- Kalin, Everett R (2002), "23: The New Testament Canon of Eusebius", in McDonald; Sanders (eds.), The Canon Debate, pp. 386–404.
- Kane, J. Herbert. (1982). A Concise History of the Christian World Mission. Baker.
- Keck, Leander E. (1988), Paul and His Letters, Fortress Press, ISBN 0-8006-2340-1
- Klutz, Todd (2002) [2000]. "Part II: Christian Origins and Development – Paul and the Development of Gentile Christianity". In Esler, Philip F. (ed.). The Early Christian World. Routledge Worlds (1st ed.). New York and London: Routledge. pp. 178–190. ISBN 9781032199344.
- Komarnitsky, Kris (2014), "Cognitive Dissonance and the Resurrection of Jesus", The Fourth R Magazine, 27 (5)
- Köstenberger, Andreas J.; Kellum, L. Scott (2009). The Cradle, the Cross, and the Crown: An Introduction to the New Testament. B&H Publishing. pp. 124–125. ISBN 978-0-8054-4365-3.
- Kremer, Jakob (1977), Die Osterevangelien – Geschichten um Geschichte, Stuttgart: Katholisches Bibelwerk
- Latourette, Kenneth Scott (1941) [1937]. A History of the Expansion of Christianity. Vol. 1. New York and London: Harper and Brothers.
- Lawrence, Arren Bennet (2017), Comparative Characterization in the Sermon on the Mount: Characterization of the Ideal Disciple, Wipf and Stock Publishers
- Levine, Amy-Jill (2006). Amy-Jill Levine; et al. (eds.). The Historical Jesus in Context. Princeton University Press. ISBN 978-0-691-00992-6.
- Loke, Andrew Ter Ern (2017), The Origin of Divine Christology, vol. 169, Cambridge University Press, ISBN 978-1-108-19142-5
- Ludemann, Gerd, What Really Happened to Jesus? trans. J. Bowden, Louisville, Kentucky: Westminster John Knox Press, 1995
- Lüdemann, Gerd; Özen, Alf (1996), De opstanding van Jezus. Een historische benadering (Was mit Jesus wirklich geschah. Die Auferstehung historisch betrachtet), The Have/Averbode
- Lynch, Joseph H. (2010). Early Christianity: A Brief History. Oxford University Press. ISBN 9780195138559.
- MacCulloch, Diarmaid (2010). Christianity: The First Three Thousand Years. Penguin Books. ISBN 978-1-101-18999-3.
- Mack, Burton L. (1995), Who wrote the New Testament? The making of the Christian myth, Harper San Francisco, ISBN 978-0-06-065517-4
- Mack, Burton L. (1997) [1995], Wie schreven het Nieuwe Testament werkelijk? Feiten, mythen en motieven. (Who Wrote the New Testament? The Making of the Christian Myth), Uitgeverij Ankh-Hermes bv
- Maier, P. L. (1975), "The Empty Tomb as History", Christianity Today
- McDonald, L. M.; Sanders, J. A., eds. (2002), The Canon Debate, Hendrickson
- McGrath, Alister E. (2006), Christianity: An Introduction, Wiley-Blackwell, ISBN 1-4051-0899-1
- Milavec, Aaron (2003). The Didache: Faith, Hope, & Life of the Earliest Christian Communities, 50-70 C.E. Newman Press. ISBN 978-0-8091-0537-3.
- Mitchell, Margaret M.; Young, Frances M., eds. (2006). The Cambridge History of Christianity. Vol. 1. Cambridge University Press. ISBN 978-0-521-81239-9.
- Moss, Candida (2012). "Current Trends in the Study of Early Christian Martyrdom". Bulletin for the Study of Religion. 41 (3): 22–29. doi:10.1558/bsor.v41i3.22.
- Neill, Stephen (1986). A History of Christian Missions. Penguin Books. Comprehensive survey
- Netland, Harold (2001), Encountering Religious Pluralism: The Challenge to Christian Faith & Mission, InterVarsity Press
- Neufeld (1964), The Earliest Christian Confessions, Grand Rapids: Eerdmans
- Niswonger, Richard L. (1993). New Testament History. Zondervan Publishing Company. ISBN 0-310-31201-9.
- O'Collins, Gerald (1978), What are They Saying About the Resurrection?, New York: Paulist Press
- Pagels, Elaine (2005), De Gnostische Evangelien (The Gnostic Gospels), Servire
- Pannenberg, Wolfhart (1968), Jesus – God and Man, translated by Lewis Wilkins; Duane Pribe, Philadelphia: Westminster
- Pao, David W. (2016), Acts and the Isaianic New Exodus, Wipf and Stock Publishers
- Pelikan, Jaroslav Jan (1975), The Christian Tradition: The Emergence of the Catholic Tradition (100–600), University of Chicago Press, ISBN 0-226-65371-4
- Peterson, E. (1959). "Christianus". Frühkirche, Judentum und Gnosis. Herder, Freiburg.
- Powell, Mark Allan (1998). Jesus as a Figure in History: How Modern Historians View the Man from Galilee. Westminster John Knox Press. ISBN 978-0-664-25703-3.
- Redford, Douglas (2007), The Life and Ministry of Jesus: The Gospels, Standard, ISBN 978-0-7847-1900-8
- Rowland, Christopher (1985), Christian Origins: An Account of the Setting and Character of the Most Important Messianic Sect of Judaism, SPCK, ISBN 9780281041107
- Sanders, E. P. (1993). The Historical Figure of Jesus. Allen Lane. ISBN 978-0-7139-9059-1.
- Seifrid, Mark A. (1992). "'Justification by Faith' and The Disposition of Paul's Argument". Justification by Faith: The Origin and Development of a Central Pauline Theme. Novum Testamentum, Supplements. Leiden: Brill Publishers. ISBN 90-04-09521-7. ISSN 0167-9732.
- Smith, J. L. (September 1969). "Resurrection Faith Today" (PDF). Theological Studies. 30 (3): 393–419. doi:10.1177/004056396903000301. S2CID 59022803. Archived from the original (PDF) on 2022-10-01.
- Stanton, Graham (2002). The Gospels and Jesus (2nd ed.). Oxford: Oxford University Press. ISBN 9780191661686.
- Stendahl, Krister (July 1963). "The Apostle Paul and the Introspective Conscience of the West" (PDF). Harvard Theological Review. 56 (3). Cambridge: Cambridge University Press on behalf of the Harvard Divinity School: 199–215. doi:10.1017/S0017816000024779. ISSN 1475-4517. JSTOR 1508631. LCCN 09003793. S2CID 170331485. Archived (PDF) from the original on 2021-12-24.
- Tabor, James D. (1998), "Ancient Judaism: Nazarenes and Ebionites", The Jewish Roman World of Jesus, Department of Religious Studies at the University of North Carolina at Charlotte, archived from the original on 2010-06-10
- Talbert, Charles H. (2011), The Development of Christology during the First Hundred Years: and Other Essays on Early Christian Christology. Supplements to Novum Testamentum 140., Leiden: Brill Publishers
- Taylor, Joan E. (1993), Christians and the Holy Places: The Myth of Jewish-Christian Origins, Oxford University Press, ISBN 0198147856
- Thiessen, Matthew (September 2014). Breytenbach, Cilliers; Thom, Johan (eds.). "Paul's Argument against Gentile Circumcision in Romans 2:17-29". Novum Testamentum. 56 (4). Leiden: Brill Publishers: 373–391. doi:10.1163/15685365-12341488. eISSN 1568-5365. ISSN 0048-1009. JSTOR 24735868.
- Tuckett, Christopher M. (2001). "Sources and Methods". In Bockmuehl, Markus N. A. (ed.). The Cambridge Companion to Jesus. Cambridge University Press. pp. 121–137. ISBN 978-0521796781.
- Van Daalen, D. H. (1972), The Real Resurrection, London: Collins
- Vidmar (2005), The Catholic Church Through the Ages
- Walker, Williston (1959), A History of the Christian Church
- Weiss, Johannes (1910), Der erste Korintherbrief (9th ed.), Göttingen: Vandenhoeck & Ruprecht
- White, L. Michael (2004), From Jesus to Christianity, HarperCollins, ISBN 0-06-052655-6
- Wilken, Robert Louis (2012). The First Thousand Years: A Global History of Christianity. New Haven and London: Yale University Press. ISBN 978-0-300-11884-1. JSTOR j.ctt32bd7m. LCCN 2012021755. S2CID 160590164.
- Wilckens, Ulrich (1970), Auferstehung, Stuttgart and Berlin: Kreuz Verlag
- Wright, N.T. (1992), The New Testament and the People of God, Fortress Press, ISBN 0-8006-2681-8
- Wright, N.T. (2003), The Resurrection of the Son of God, Minneapolis: Fortress Press, ISBN 978-0-8006-2679-2
- Wylen, Stephen M. (1995), The Jews in the Time of Jesus: An Introduction, Paulist Press, ISBN 0-8091-3610-4

=== Web sources ===
History of Christianity: Early Christianity
Historical background of the New Testament / First century / Followed by: Christianity in the ante-Nicene period
BC	C1	C2	C3	C4	C5	C6	C7	C8	C9	C10
C11	C12	C13	C14	C15	C16	C17	C18	C19	C20	C21
