= Tertullus =

Lawyer in the Acts of the Apostles

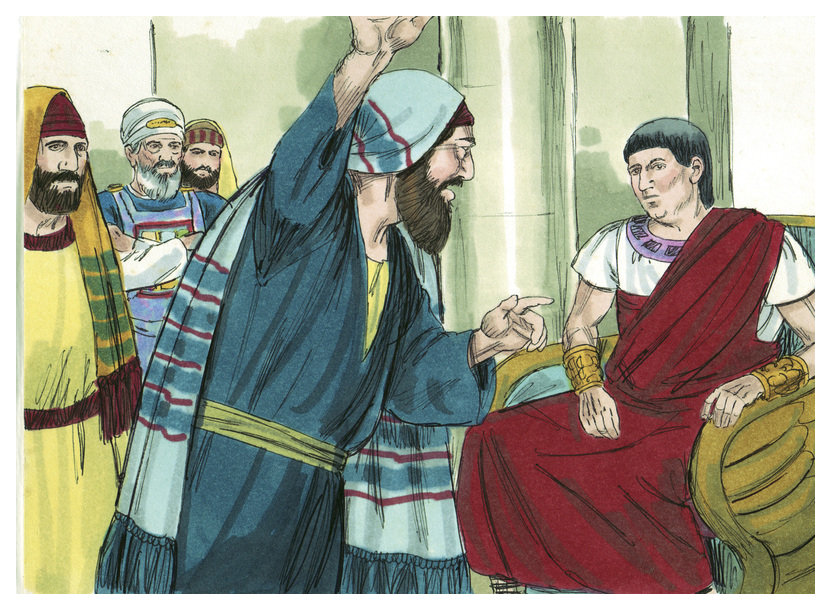
Tertullus before Felix

In the New Testament, Tertullus (a modification of "Tertius") was an orator or lawyer who was employed by the Jewish leaders to state their case against the apostle Paul in the presence of Felix (Acts 24:1-9).

== New Testament account ==
Tertullus gives a formal rhetorical presentation on behalf of the Jewish leaders opposed to Paul's preaching. The charges he raised against Paul were that he created disturbances "among all the Jews throughout the world", an offence against the Roman government (crimen majestatis), secondly, that he was a ringleader of the sect of the Nazarenes; and thirdly, that he attempted to profane the temple, a crime which the Jews were permitted to punish.

It is generally assumed that Tertullus was himself a Hellenistic Jew, although he could have been a Gentile. It is not certain whether the trial would have taken place in Latin or Greek.

Tertullus before Antonius Felix makes the first recorded use of the plural "Nazarenes" (Nazoraioi, the plural form of Iesous ho Nazoraios "Jesus of Nazareth") to refer to Christians, although the use of the term "Christians" at Antioch had already been noted in Acts, and it was used by Herod Agrippa II in the next trial of Paul before Porcius Festus. Tertullus' use of the Greek term Nazoraioi has continuity with the Hebrew term Notzrim found in later rabbinical literature. Tertullus presumably could not use the Antioch term Christianoi (Hebrew Meshiykhiyyim משיחיים) since Christianoi from Greek Christos (literally "Anointed One", "Messiah") might imply Tertullus' recognition of Jesus of Nazareth as a Davidic "Anointed One" or "Messiah".
