= 1st century in religion =

The 1st century would see the foundation of Christianity and the growth and establishment of Buddhism in China.

== By location ==
=== Asia ===
==== China ====
The 1st century would see the establishment of Buddhism in China with the White Horse Temple constructed in AD 68 under the patronage of Emperor Ming of the Eastern Han dynasty.

==== Judea ====
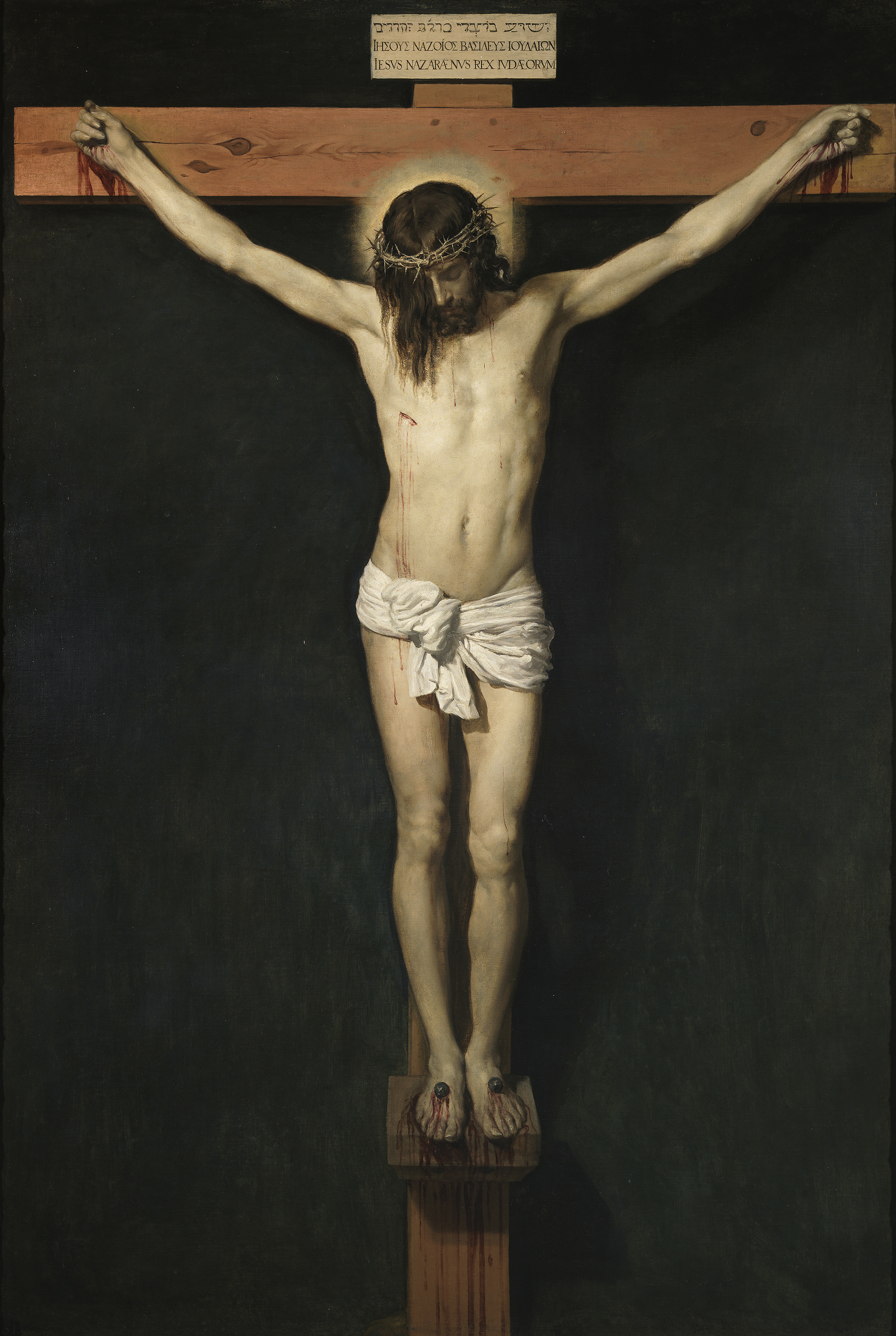
Christ Crucified (c. 1632) by Diego Velázquez which depicts Jesus on the crucifix.

Judea in the 1st century would see the foundation of Christianity by Jesus of Nazareth and Jesus' crucifixion.

== Events ==
- 1 AD: Birth of Jesus, as assigned by Dionysius Exiguus in his anno Domini era according to at least one scholar. However, most scholars think that Dionysius placed the birth of Jesus in the previous year, 1 BC. Furthermore, most modern scholars do not consider Dionysius' calculations authoritative, placing the event several years earlier (see Chronology of Jesus).
- 8 AD: Finding in the Temple: Jesus is found in the Temple of Jerusalem reasoning with the learned men of Judea.
- 29 AD: According to the Gospel of Luke (Luke 3:1-2), the ministries of John the Baptist and Jesus probably began in this year. Jesus is baptized by John the Baptist.
- 29 AD: Jesus is executed by crucifixion, according to Roman Catholic tradition. and Tertullian's chronology.
- 30 AD: 7 April (Good Friday) – Jesus is crucified (according to one dating scheme). He is later reported alive by his disciples.
- 33 AD: April 3 – According to Colin Humphrey's account, Jesus of Nazareth's Last Supper takes place.
- 67 AD: Buddhism comes to China with the two monks Kasyapa and Dharmaraksha.
- 67 AD: Buddhism is officially established in China with the founding of the White Horse Temple.
- 100 AD: The Gospel of John is widely believed to have been written.
