= Patrial name =

Variety of surname

A patrial name or geographical surname is a surname or second cognomen given to person deriving from a toponym, the name for a geographical place. It was particularly common in ancient Greece and Rome. The lack of a family surname and use of a geographical cognomen as a surname may the sign of a lower class, such as courtesans when signing a contract. With medieval writers, Christian, Jewish and Muslim, whose works circulated around many countries, geographical cognomens sometimes served to distinguish better than "son of," "ben" or "ibn."

Roman Military commanders often took a second cognomen, an agnomen, recalling a victorious campaign: Africanus, Asiaticus, Macedonicus, Numantinus. These may be inherited as in the case of Augustus who inherited the cognomen Thurinus.

== Formation ==
Examples in formation of patrial names include:

1. definite article and noun - using a demonym (also called gentile name or gentilic, from Latin nomen gentile or gentilicium)

- Athenagoras the Athenian (Athenagoras o Athenaios, Ἀθηναγόρας ὁ Ἀθηναῖος).
- Saul of Tarsus "Saul the Tarsian" (Saulos o Tarseus, Σαῦλος [ὁ] Ταρσεύς)
- Lucius the Cyrenian (Loukios o Kurenaios Λούκιος ὁ Κυρηναῖος)
- Trophimus "called the Ephesian" (Trofimos o Efesios, Τρόφιμος ὁ Ἐφέσιος)
- Ibn Muadh al-Jayyani (989-1079) "al Jayyani", the man of Jaén
- Isaac Alfasi (1013-1103) "al Fasi", the man of Fez, Morocco

2. unclear: indefinite noun / adjectival forms

- Mary Magdalene, "Mary of Magdala" (Greek Maria Magadelene, Μαρία Μαγδαληνή).

3. adjectives - a common Latin method for making a toponymic adjective is to add -[i]ensis

- Giraldus Cambrensis "Gerald of Wales"
- Galfridus Monemutensis, "Geoffrey of Monmouth"

4. genitive "of" constructions

- Jacopo da Bologna "Jacob of Bologna"
- Jacques de Vitry "James of Vitry-sur-Seine"

In examples 1 through 3, where the noun or adjective has case declension the partial name will typically decline in accordance with normal noun or adjective rules. For example, in Giraldi Cambrensis opera - "the works of [genitive] Gerald of Wales" - Giraldus declines to Giraldi (the genitive form of Gerald) and cambrensis (nominative adjective) declines to cambrensis (genitive adjective, but the same as nominative in this example). The declension is normally not followed when citing Latin patrial names in English, "of Giraldus Cambrensis," but may cause confusion when trying to identify the nominative spellings of patrial names from Latin or Greek sources.

== Modern era examples ==
Modern era examples in Europe are generally limited to nicknames, or deliberate choices of a birthplace as a penname or stagename or change of name by deed poll:

- Bela Lugosi stagename "from Lugoj"
- George Brassaï pseudonym "from Brașov"

== See also ==
- Nisba (onomastics) – Element in Arabic names
