= Nazarene (sect) =

First-century Christian sect

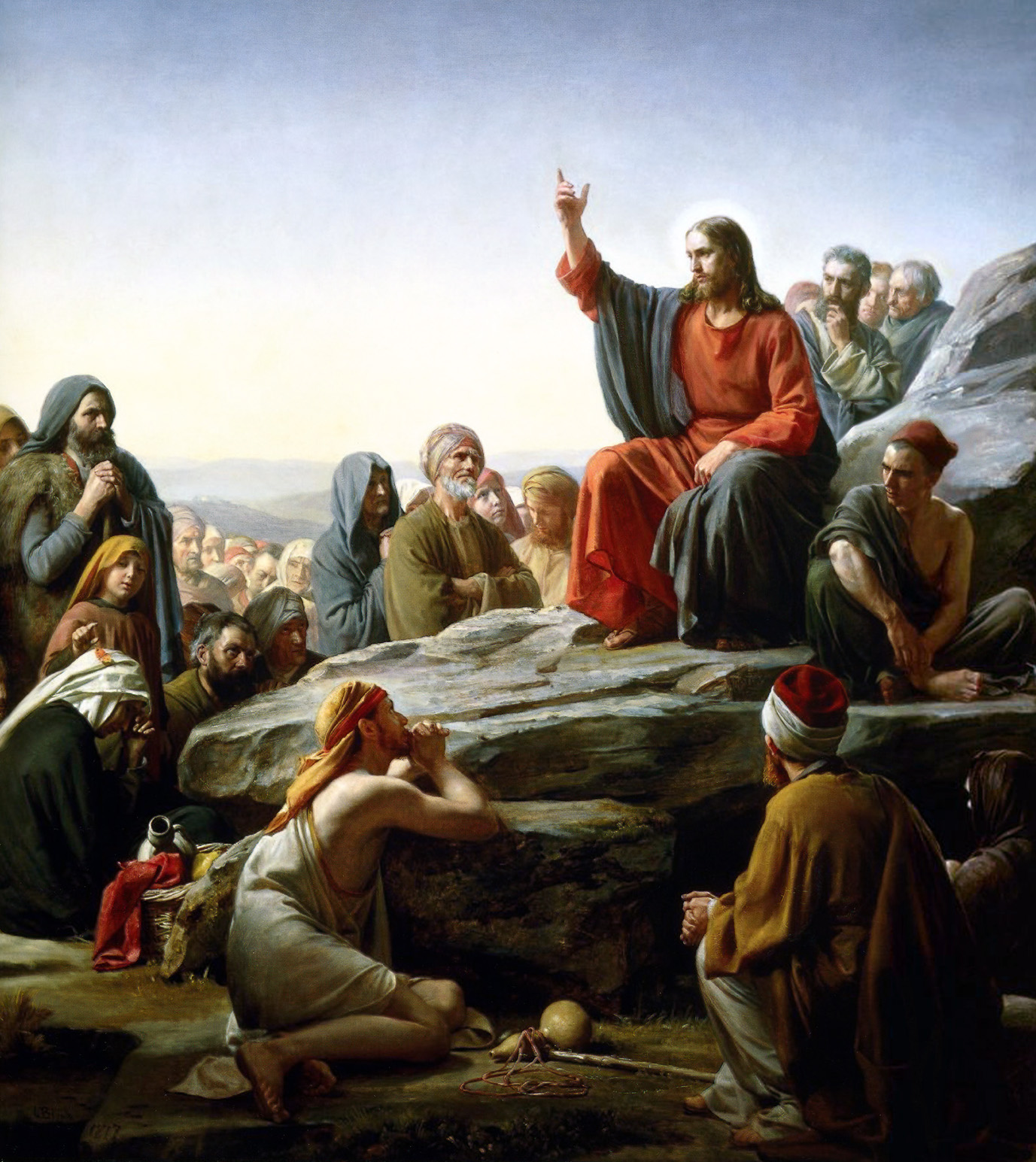
"The Sermon on the Mount" by Carl Bloch (1834–1890)

The Nazarenes (or Nazoreans; Greek: Ναζωραῖοι, romanized: Nazōraioi) refers to either an early Jewish Christian sect in first-century Judaism or more likely a 2nd century sect or a Syrian sect from the 4th century, all of which believed in the divinity of Jesus and his virgin birth. The first use of the term is found in the Acts of the Apostles (Acts 24, Acts 24:5) of the New Testament, where Paul the Apostle is accused of being a ringleader of the sect of the Nazarenes ("πρωτοστάτην τε τῆς τῶν Ναζωραίων αἱρέσεως") before the Roman procurator Antonius Felix at Caesarea Maritima by Tertullus. At that time, the term simply designated followers of Jesus of Nazareth, as the Hebrew term נוֹצְרִי (nôṣrî), and the Arabic term نَصْرَانِي (naṣrānī), still do.

They considered as their holy scriptures: the Hebrew Bible and the New Testament, which included the Gospel of Matthew in Hebrew or Aramaic. The Nazoreans believed that Jesus was the Christ, born of a virgin, suffered and resurrected again under Pontius Pilate, believed in the resurrection of the dead, and accepted Paul's mission to the gentiles.

As time passed, the term came to refer to a sect of Jewish Christians who continued to observe the Torah, in contrast to gentiles who eschewed Torah observance. They are mentioned and described by Epiphanius of Salamis and are mentioned later by Jerome and Augustine of Hippo. The writers made a distinction between the Nazarenes of their time and the "Nazarenes" mentioned in Acts 24:5.

== Nazarenes as a Title ==
The English term Nazarene is commonly used to translate two related Greek words that appear in the New Testament: Nazōraios (Ναζωραῖος, Ναζαραῖος) ("Nazorean") and Nazarēnos (Ναζαρηνός) ("Nazarene"). The term Nazōraios may have a religious significance instead of denoting a place of origin, while Nazarēnos is an adjectival form of the phrase apo Nazaret "from Nazareth."

Because of this, the phrases traditionally rendered as "Jesus of Nazareth" can also be translated as "Jesus the Nazarene" or "Jesus the Nazorean." In the New Testament, the form Nazōraios or Nazaraios is more common than Nazarēnos (meaning "from Nazareth").

In Arabic, however, Nasrani (نصراني), the name given to Christians in the Quran can be interpreted as coming from the root verb n-ṣ-r, meaning victory, or support. The meaning is defined in Surah al Imran, verse 52 where Jesus asks who will become his supporters (Ansar-i) for the sake of God; the Hawariyun (Apostles) answer that they will become the Ansar. The same root also refers to the Ansar, those that sheltered Muhammad in Medina.

== Nazarene sect of (1st century) ==
The Greek epithet Nazōraios is applied to Jesus 14 times in the New Testament, and is used once in Acts to refer to the sect of Christians of which Paul was a leader. It is traditionally translated as "a man from Nazareth"; the plural Nazōraioi would mean "men from Nazareth". The title is first applied to the Christians by Tertullus (Acts 24:5), though Herod Agrippa II (Acts 26:28) uses the term "Christians" which had first been used at Antioch (Acts 11:26). The name used by Tertullus survives into Mishnaic and modern Hebrew as notzrim (נוצרים), a standard Hebrew term for "Christian". The name also exists in the Quran and modern Arabic as نَصَارَىٰ naṣārā (plural of نَصْرَانِيّ naṣrānī "Christian").

Tertullian (c. 160 – c. 220, Against Marcion, 4:8) records that the Jews called Christians "Nazarenes" from Jesus being a man of Nazareth, though he also makes the connection with Nazarites in Lamentations 4:7. Jerome too records that, in the synagogues, the word "Nazarenes" was used to describe Christians. Eusebius, around 311 CE, records that the name "Nazarenes" had formerly been used of Christians. The use relating to a specific "sect" of Christians does not occur until Epiphanius (310/20–403). According to Arnold Ehrhardt, just as Antioch coined the term Christians, so Jerusalem coined the term Nazarenes, from Jesus of Nazareth.

The terms "sect of the Nazarenes" and "Jesus of Nazareth" both employ the adjective nasraya (ܕܢܨܪܝܐ) in the Syrian Aramaic Peshitta, from Nasrat (ܢܨܪܬ) for Nazareth.

== Nazarenes (4th century) ==
According to Epiphanius in his Panarion, the 4th-century Nazoreans (Ναζωραῖοι) were originally Jewish converts of the Apostles who fled Jerusalem because of Jesus' prophecy of its coming siege. They fled to Pella, Peraea (northeast of Jerusalem), and eventually spread outwards to Beroea (Aleppo) and Basanitis, where they permanently settled (Panarion 29.3.3).

The Nazarenes were similar to the Ebionites, in that they considered themselves Jews, maintained an adherence to the Law of Moses. Unlike the Ebionites, they accepted the Virgin Birth. They seemed to consider Jesus as a prophet, but other attestations from the church fathers might suggest that they also hold on the divinity of Jesus.

As late as the eleventh century, Cardinal Humbert of Mourmoutiers still referred to the Nazarene sect as a Sabbath-keeping Christian body existing at that time. Modern scholars believe it is the Pasagini or Pasagians who are referenced by Cardinal Humbert, suggesting the Nazarene sect existed well into the eleventh century and beyond. The Catholic writings of Bonacursus entitled Against the Heretics is the chief authority of their history. It is believed that Gregorius of Bergamo, about 1250 CE, also wrote concerning the Nazarenes as the Pasagians.

=== Gospel of the Nazarenes ===
The Gospel of the Nazarenes is the title given to fragments of one of the lost Jewish-Christian Gospels partially reconstructed from the writings of Jerome.

=== Patristic references to "Nazarenes" ===
In the 4th century, Jerome also refers to Nazarenes as those "who accept Messiah in such a way that they do not cease to observe the old Law." In his Epistle 75, to Augustine, he said:

What shall I say of the Ebionites who pretend to be Christians? To-day there still exists among the Jews in all the synagogues of the East a heresy which is called that of the Minæans, and which is still condemned by the Pharisees; [its followers] are ordinarily called 'Nasarenes'; they believe that Christ, the son of God, was born of the Virgin Mary, and they hold him to be the one who suffered under Pontius Pilate and ascended to heaven, and in whom we also believe. But while they pretend to be both Jews and Christians, they are neither.

Jerome saw a distinction between Nazarenes and Ebionites, a different Jewish sect, but does not comment on whether Nazarene Jews considered themselves to be "Christian" or not or how they viewed themselves as fitting into the descriptions he uses. He clearly equates them with Filaster's Nazarei. His criticism of the Nazarenes is noticeably more direct and critical than that of Epiphanius.

The following creed is from a church at Constantinople at the same period, and condemns practices of the Nazarenes:

I renounce all customs, rites, legalisms, unleavened breads & sacrifices of lambs of the Hebrews, and all other feasts of the Hebrews, sacrifices, prayers, aspersions, purifications, sanctifications and propitiations and fasts, and new moons, and Sabbaths, and superstitions, and hymns and chants and observances and Synagogues, and the food and drink of the Hebrews; in one word, I renounce everything Jewish, every law, rite and custom and if afterwards I shall wish to deny and return to Jewish superstition, or shall be found eating with the Jews, or feasting with them, or secretly conversing and condemning the Christian religion instead of openly confuting them and condemning their vain faith, then let the trembling of Gehazi cleave to me, as well as the legal punishments to which I acknowledge myself liable. And may I be anathema in the world to come, and may my soul be set down with Satan and the devils.

"Nazarenes" are referenced past the fourth century CE as well. Jacobus de Voragine (1230–98) described James as a "Nazarene" in The Golden Legend, vol 7. Thomas Aquinas (1225–74) quotes Augustine of Hippo, who was given an apocryphal book called Hieremias (Jeremiah in Latin) by a "Hebrew of the Nazarene Sect", in Catena Aurea — Gospel of Matthew, chapter 27. So this terminology seems to have remained at least through the 13th century in European discussions.

=== Nazarene beliefs ===
The beliefs of the Nazarene sect or sects are described through various church fathers and heresiologists.

- in Jesus as Messiah:

The Nazarenes... accept Messiah in such a way that they do not cease to observe the old Law.

— Jerome, On. Is. 8:14

- in the Virgin Birth:

They believe that the Messiah was born of the Virgin Mary.

— Jerome, Letter 75 Jerome to Augustine

- Adhering to circumcision and the Law of Moses:

They disagree with Jews because they have come to faith in Christ; but since they are still fettered by the Law – circumcision, the Sabbath, and the rest – they are not in accord with the Christians.

— Epiphanius of Salamis, Panarion 29.7.4

- Use of Old Testament and New Testament:

They use not only the New Testament but the Old Testament as well, as the Jews do.

— Epiphanius of Salamis, Panarion 29.7.2

- Use of Hebrew and Aramaic New Testament source texts:

They have the Gospel according to Matthew in its entirety in Hebrew. For it is clear that they still preserve this, in the Hebrew alphabet, as it was originally written.

— Epiphanius of Salamis, Panarion 29.9.4

And he Hegesippus the Nazarene quotes some passages from the Gospel according to the Hebrews and from the Syriac [the Aramaic], and some particulars from the Hebrew tongue, showing that he was a convert from the Hebrews, and he mentions other matters as taken from the oral tradition of the Jews.

— Eusebius, Church History 4.22

== Nazranis of India ==
The Saint Thomas Christians of Kerala, known locally as Nasranis or Nazarenes, have long been associated with Jewish and Hebrew origins. This nomenclature was historically used to describe early Jewish Christians, suggesting that the Nasrani community have roots in Jewish communities of the Near East. Apostle Thomas, during his missionary endeavours, preached to dispersed Israelite communities in India, aligning with patterns observed in other apostle's missions. Dr. Ray A Pritz, in his thesis Nazarene Jewish Christianity mentions that "Christian" (followers of Christ) was originally used by the non-Christians to designate believers among the Gentiles while the Nazarenes was already used in Israel to describe Jewish adherents to the new Messianic sect. Further supporting this hypothesis are cultural and linguistic parallels between the Nasranis and Jewish communities in Kerala, such as shared traditions and place names with Hebrew connotations. Also the fact that they enjoyed elite and commercial rights by the Chera king could have been possible since they share with the Jews having received the royal charter engraved on copper plates from Cheraman Perumal would be only possible if they were ethnically Jews because lower caste converts didn't have this privilege. They had the rights to sit before kings, ride horses, elephants, chariots and wear headgear just like the Brahmins.They were also given lordship over seventeen underprivileged castes. They also practiced and until today practice strict endogamy among themselves; also, conversions are discouraged in the non-Catholic traditional Syrian Christian denominations. Even catholic Nazranis do not let converts or non-Nazarenes to participate or involve in their practices and customs and are given separate dioceses/parishes. Until the arrival of the Portuguese they had strict dietary customs, and observed Jewish holidays such as Passover and Yom Kippur.Till today pesaha is observed and unleavened bread similar to a matzah is prepared in every Syrian Christian household on Maundy Thursday. In fact Y-DNA genetic signatures have been reported which indicate clear Cohen (Aaronic) ancestry, Levite ancestry and Judahite ancestry. The Brahmin origin of these Christians are merely namesake which was the term used to denote priests in the Indian languages then is another claim. It is also a fact that the Apostle Thomas came in search for the Jews in India first to preach the gospel.

== Nasoraean Mandaeans ==
Those few who are initiated into the secrets of the Mandaean religion are called Naṣuraiia or Nasoraeans/Nasaraeans meaning guardians or possessors of secret rites and knowledge. According to the Haran Gawaita, Nasoraean Mandaeans fled Jerusalem before its fall in 70 CE due to persecution. The word Naṣuraiia may come from the root n-ṣ-r meaning "to keep", since although they reject the Mosaic Law, they consider themselves to be keepers of Gnosis. Epiphanius mentions a group called Nasaraeans (Νασαραίοι, Part 18 of the Panarion), distinguished from the "Nazoraioi" (Part 29). According to Joseph Lightfoot, Epiphanius also makes a distinction between the Ossaeans and the Nasaraeans, the two main groups within the Essenes:

The Nasaraeans – they were Jews by nationality – originally from Gileaditis, Bashanitis and the Transjordan ... They acknowledged Moses and believed that he had received laws – not this law, however, but some other. And so, they were Jews who kept all the Jewish observances, but they would not offer sacrifice or eat meat. They considered it unlawful to eat meat or make sacrifices with it. They claim that these Books are fictions, and that none of these customs were instituted by the fathers. This was the difference between the Nasaraeans and the others.

— Epiphanius' Panarion 1:18

The Nasaraeans may be the same as the Mandaeans of today. Epiphanius writes (29:6) that they existed before Christ. That is questioned by some, but others accept the pre-Christian origin of this group.

Van Bladel (2017) suggests that the Mandaeans and Nasoraeans were historically separate groups, with the Nasoraeans being a Judeo-Christian priestly baptismal sect from central Mesopotamia that found followers from the indigenous Mandaeans of southern Mesopotamia. According to van Bladel's hypothesis, the original Mandaean laypeople had their Mesopotamian temples decimated due to temple pillaging during the Sasanian period and switched to the Nasoraean priests' religion in order to compensate for the loss of their former religion. However, this hypothesis has been criticized by Predrag Bukovec and other scholars. Bogdan Burtea (2008) has also proposed that the Nasoraeans and Mandaeans may have historically been separate groups.

In the Ginza Rabba, the term Nasoraean is used to refer to righteous Mandaeans, i.e., Mandaean priests (comparable to the concept of pneumatikoi in Gnosticism). As Nasoraeans, Mandaeans believe that they constitute the true congregation of bnia nhura meaning 'Sons of Light'.

== Modern "Nazarene" churches ==
A number of modern churches use the word "Nazarene" or variants in their name or beliefs:

- The Apostolic Christian Church (Nazarene), originating in the Swiss Nazarene Baptist movement;
- The Church of the Nazarene, a Protestant Christian denomination that was born out of the Holiness Movement of the late 19th and early 20th centuries;

== See also ==
- Early Christianity
- Essenes
- Jewish Christians
- Judaizers
- Mandaeism
- Messianic Judaism
- St Thomas Christians
- Synagogal Judaism
