= Proto-orthodox Christianity =

Early Christian movement which was the precursor of Christian orthodoxy

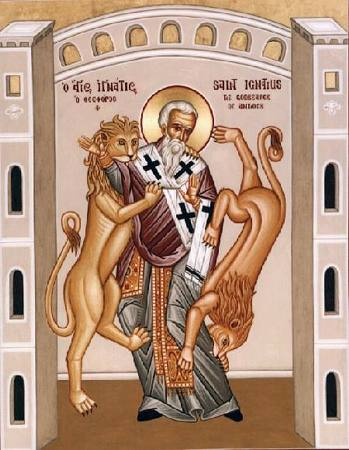
Ignatius of Antioch, one of the Apostolic Fathers, was the third Patriarch of Antioch, said to be a student of John the Apostle. En route to his martyrdom in Rome, Ignatius wrote a series of letters which exemplify very early Christian theology, dealing with such topics as modification of the sabbath to Sunday, promotion of the office of bishop, and critique of "Judaizers".

Proto-orthodox Christianity or proto-orthodoxy was the early Christian movement that was the precursor of Christian orthodoxy. Older literature often referred to the group as "early Catholic" in the sense that their views were the closest to those of the more organized "Catholic" Church that was the State church of the Roman Empire during the 4th and 5th centuries. The term "proto-orthodox" was coined by Bentley Layton, a scholar of Gnosticism and a Coptologist at Yale, but is often attributed to New Testament scholar Bart D. Ehrman, who has popularized the term by using it in books for a non-academic audience. Ehrman argues that when this group became prominent by the end of the third century, it "stifled its opposition, it claimed that its views had always been the majority position and that its rivals were, and always had been, 'heretics', who willfully 'chose' to reject the 'true belief'."

Although early Christianity had many diverse sects and doctrines, critics of the stance of downplaying the proto-orthodox's prominence (such as Larry W. Hurtado), generally argue that the writings of the Catholic anti-heresiologists condemning others as heretics were still essentially accurate: that of all the Christian groups, the "proto-orthodox" has the most common ground with the immediate followers of Jesus in the Apostolic Age and Christianity in the 1st century, and were indeed the most common variety of Christianity even then.

== Proto-orthodoxy versus other Christianities ==
According to Ehrman, "'Proto-orthodoxy' refers to the set of [Christian] beliefs that was going to become dominant in the 4th century, held by people before the 4th century."

Ehrman expands on the thesis of German New Testament scholar Walter Bauer (1877–1960), laid out in his primary work Orthodoxy and Heresy in Earliest Christianity (1934). Bauer hypothesised that the Church Fathers, most notably Eusebius in his Ecclesiastical History, "had not given an objective account of the relationship of early Christian groups." Instead, Eusebius would have "rewritten the history of early Christian conflicts, so as to validate the victory of the orthodox party that he himself represented." Eusebius claimed that orthodoxy derived directly from the teachings of Jesus and his earliest followers, and had always been the majority view; by contrast, all other Christian views were branded as "heresies", that is to say, willful corruptions of the truth, held by small numbers of minorities. (Note: "Heresy, in Eusebius' understanding, is always necessarily by definition "a late, derivative, corrupt, minority view", while "orthodoxy is the original truth, that was held by the majority of churches at all times.")

In modern times, many non-orthodox early Christian writings were discovered by scholars, gradually challenging the traditional Eusebian narrative. Bauer was the first to suggest that what later became known as "orthodoxy" was originally just one out of many early Christian sects, such as the Ebionites, Gnostics, and Marcionists, that was able to eliminate all major opposition by the end of the 3rd century, and managed to establish itself as orthodoxy at the First Council of Nicaea (325) and subsequent ecumenical councils. According to Bauer, the early Egyptian churches were largely Gnostic, the 2nd-century churches in Asia Minor were largely Marcionist, and so on. But because the church in the city of Rome was "proto-orthodox", in Ehrman's terms, Bauer contended they had strategic advantages over all other sects because of their proximity to the Roman Empire's centre of power.

Bauer claims that as the Roman political and cultural elite converted to the locally held form of Christianity, they started exercising their authority and resources to influence the theology of other communities throughout the Roman Empire, sometimes by force. Bauer cites the First Epistle of Clement as an early example of the bishop of Rome interfering with the church of Corinth to impose his own proto-orthodox doctrine of apostolic succession, and to favour a certain group of local church leaders over another.

== Characteristics ==
According to Ehrman, proto-orthodox Christianity bequeathed to subsequent generations "four Gospels to tell us virtually everything we know about the life, death, and resurrection of Jesus" and "handed down to us the entire New Testament, twenty-seven books". Similar to later Chalcedonian views about Jesus, the proto-orthodox believed that Christ was both divine as well as a human being, not two halves joined. Likewise they regarded God as three persons: the Father, the Son, and the Holy Spirit; but only one God.

Martyrdom played a major role in proto-orthodox Christianity, as exemplified by Ignatius of Antioch in the beginning of the second century. Imperial authorities arrested him "evidently for Christian activities" and condemned him as fodder for wild beasts. He expressed eagerness to die, expecting thus to "attain to God". Following Ignatius, many proto-orthodox theorists saw it as a privilege to die for faith. In fact, martyrdom became a way to tell the true believers from the heretics. Those who were not willing to die for what they believed were seen as not dedicated to the faith.

Another facet of the faith was the structure of the church. It was common, as it is today, for a church to have a leader. Ignatius wrote several letters to several churches instructing them to let the leaders, usually the bishops, handle all the problems within the church. He exhorted church members to listen to the bishops since they were the leaders: "Be subject to the Bishop as to the commandment…We are clearly obligated to look upon the bishop as the Lord himself ... You should do nothing apart from the bishop." The role of the bishop paved the way for hierarchies in churches that is often seen today.

Another important aspect about proto-orthodox Christianity involves its views on Jews and Jewish practices. An important book for them was the Epistle of Barnabas, which taught that the Jewish interpretation of the Old Testament was improperly literal, and the Epistle offered metaphorical interpretations as the truth, such as on the laws concerning diet, fasting, and the Sabbath. Also, the Old Testament was specifically written to presage the coming of Jesus, Christ's covenant superseded the Mosaic covenant, but also, "the Jews had always adhered to a false religion". Those themes were also developed by the 2nd-century apologist Justin Martyr.

== Development of orthodox canon and Christology ==
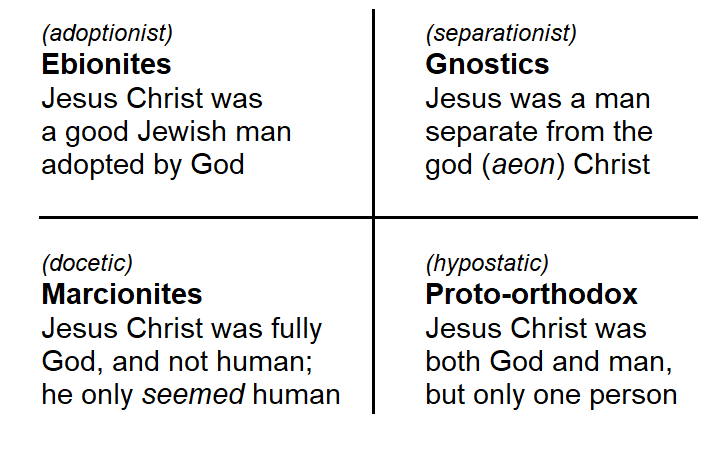
Ehrman's schematic model of four early Christian sects, including the proto-Orthodox.

In order to form a New Testament canon of uniquely Christian works, proto-orthodox Christians went through a process that was complete in the West by the beginning of the 5th century. Athanasius, bishop of Alexandria, Egypt, in his Easter letter of 367, listed the same twenty-seven New Testament books as found in the Canon of Trent. The first council that accepted the present canon of the New Testament may have been the Synod of Hippo Regius in North Africa (393). The acts of this council are lost. A brief summary of the acts was read at and accepted by the Council of Carthage (397) and the Council of Carthage (419).

To Ehrman, "Proto-orthodox Christians argued that Jesus Christ was both divine and human, that he was one being instead of two, and that he had taught his disciples the truth." This view that he is "a unity of both divine and human" (the Hypostatic union) is opposed to both Adoptionism (that Jesus was only human and "adopted" by God, as the Ebionites believed), and Docetism (that Christ was only divine and merely seemed to be human, as the Marcionists believed), as well as Separationism (that an aeon had entered Jesus' body, which separated again from him during his death on the cross, as most Gnostics believed).

For Ehrman, in the canonical gospels, Jesus is characterized as a Jewish faith healer who ministered to the most despised people of the local culture. Reports of miracle working were not uncommon during an era "in the ancient world [where] most people believed in miracles, or at least in their possibility."

== Criticism ==
The traditional Christian view is that orthodoxy emerged to codify and defend the traditions inherited from the Apostles themselves. Hurtado argues that Ehrman's "proto-orthodox" Christianity was rooted into first-century Christianity:

...to a remarkable extent early-second-century protoorthodox devotion to Jesus represents a concern to preserve, respect, promote, and develop what were by then becoming traditional expressions of belief and reverence, and that had originated in earlier years of the Christian movement. That is, proto-orthodox faith tended to affirm and develop devotional and confessional tradition [...] Arland Hultgren has shown that the roots of this appreciation of traditions of faith actually go back deeply and widely into first-century Christianity.

Critics of the traditional view assert that the claimed institutional unity of the Christian Church was propaganda constantly repeated by orthodox Christian writers, rather than a genuine historical reality. David Brakke argues that the "proto-orthodox" category tends to obscure what he says are the diversity of views among the very Christian thinkers and groups that are categorized as "proto-orthodox," sustaining an erroneous backward-looking view that a unified "proto-orthodox" viewpoint had existed from the early days of Christianity when no such unified group existed even in contrast with Ebionites, Marcionites, and Valentinian Christians:

This simple opposition obscures the diversity not only among proto-orthodoxy's others, but also among different representatives of the allegedly single proto-orthodox self. In several important respects, protoorthodox teachers, such as Justin Martyr and Clement of Alexandria, were more akin to Valentinus than to Irenaeus. Christian — and, for that matter, Jewish — self-differentiation in this period was always a multilateral affair and resulted in diverse forms of Christian thought and practice. The inclusion of these varied modes of Christian piety in the single category of 'orthodoxy' was in fact the achievement of the post-Constantinian imperial church and even then was never full or complete, but always partial and contested."

== See also ==
- Apostolic Fathers
- Catholicism
- Chalcedonian Christianity
- Church Fathers
- Criticism of Christianity
- Diversity in early Christian theology
- Early Christianity
- Gnosticism
- Historical Jesus
- Miracles of Jesus
- Misquoting Jesus
- Nicene Christianity
- Orthodox Christianity
- Orthodoxy
- Paleo-orthodoxy
- Proto-Protestantism
- Seven Ecumenical Councils
- State church of the Roman Empire

== Bibliography ==
- Ehrman, Bart D. (2 October 2003), Lost Christianities: The Battle for Scripture and the Faiths We Never Knew, New York: Oxford University Press (published 2003), ISBN 0-19-514183-0.
- Ehrman, Bart D. (2015) [1996], The New Testament: A Historical Introduction to the Early Christian Writings (6th ed.), Oxford University Press, ISBN 978-0190203825.
- Henderson, John B. (1998). The Construction of Orthodoxy and Heresy: Neo-Confucian, Islamic, Jewish, and Early Christian Patterns. Albany, NY: State University of New York Press. ISBN 9780791437599.
- Hopkins, Keith; Kelly, Christopher (2018). "12 - Christian Number and its implications". Sociological Studies in Roman History. Cambridge Classical Studies. Cambridge University Press. p. 442. ISBN 978-1-107-01891-4.
- Hurtado, Larry W. (2005), Lord Jesus Christ: Devotion to Jesus in Earliest Christianity, William B Eerdmans, ISBN 9780802831675
- McDonald, Lee Martin; Sanders, James A., eds. (2001), The Canon Debate, Hendrickson Publishers, ISBN 1565635175
- O'Connor, John Bonaventure (1913). "St. Ignatius of Antioch". In Herbermann, Charles (ed.). Catholic Encyclopedia. New York: Robert Appleton Company.
- Reid, George J. (1913). "Canon of the New Testament". In Herbermann, Charles (ed.). Catholic Encyclopedia. New York: Robert Appleton Company.
- Sanders, E.P. (1996), The Historical Figure of Jesus, Penguin, ISBN 0140144994
