= Christianity in the ante-Nicene period =

Period following the Apostolic Age to the First Council of Nicaea in 325

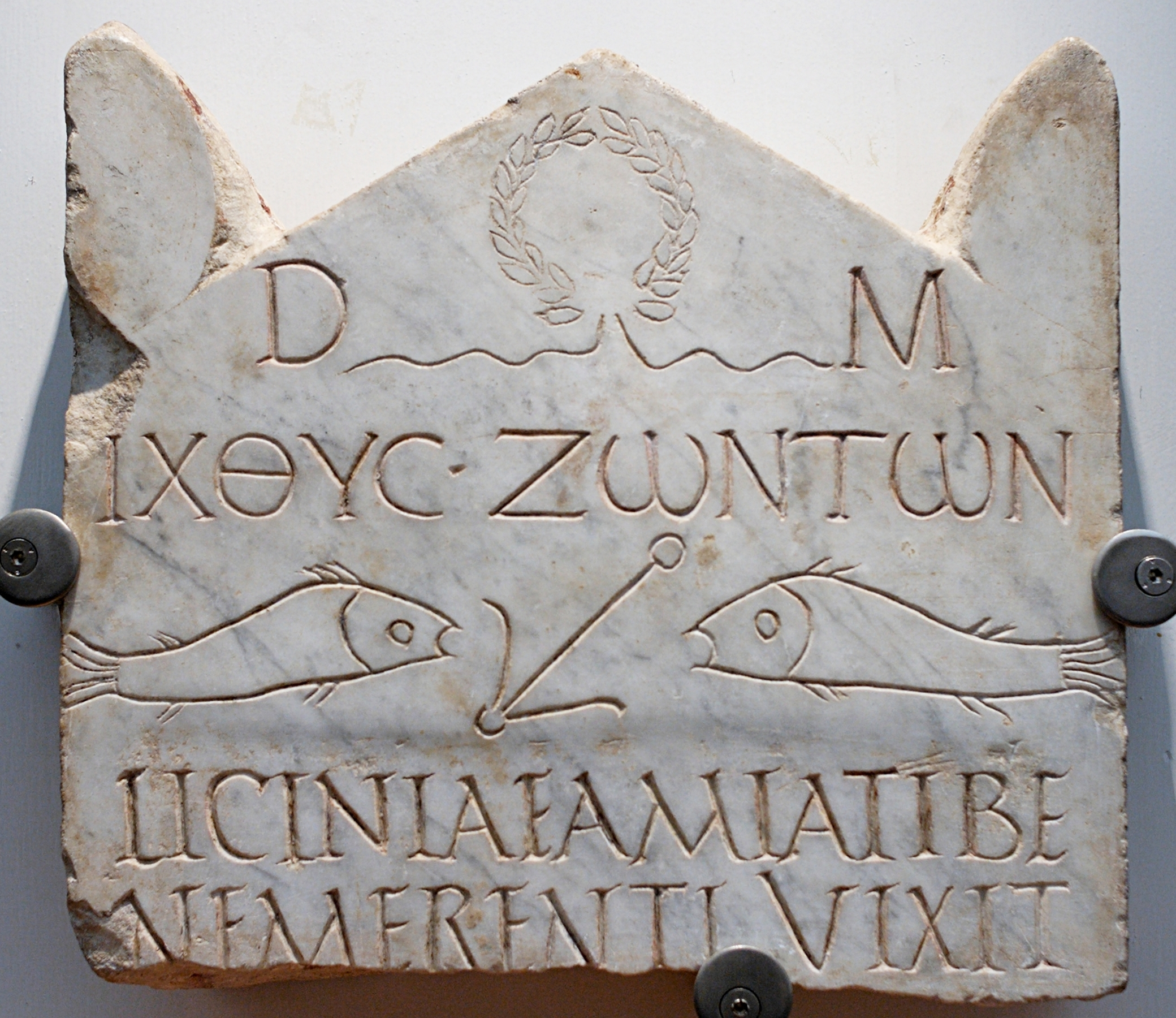
Funerary stele of Licinia Amias on marble, in the National Roman Museum. One of the earliest Christian inscriptions found, it comes from the early 3rd-century Vatican necropolis area in Rome. Upper tier: dedication to the Dis Manibus and Christian motto in Greek letters ΙΧΘΥϹ ΖΩΝΤΩΝ (Ikhthus zōntōn, "fish of the living", a predecessor of the Ichthys symbol); middle tier: depiction of fish and an anchor; lower tier: Latin inscription of the identity of the deceased LICINIAE FAMIATI BE / NE MERENTI VIXIT.

Christianity in the ante-Nicene period was the period in Christian history following the Apostolic Age (1st century AD) up to the First Council of Nicaea (325 AD). Although the use of the term Christian (Koine Greek: Χριστιανός) is attested in the Acts of the Apostles (80–90 AD), the earliest recorded use of the term Christianity (Koine Greek: Χριστιανισμός) is attested by the ante-Nicene Father and theologian Ignatius of Antioch (c. 107 AD).

While the Jewish–Christian community was centered in Jerusalem in the 1st century AD, Gentile Christianity spread widely in the 2nd century AD. One stream of Gentile Christianity (so-called "proto-Orthodox Christianity") that emerged in this period in the persons and theological positions of the Apostolic Fathers would eventually become the international Great Church. Proto-Orthodox Christianity placed importance on the sacrifice of Jesus on the cross as saving humanity, and described Jesus as the incarnated Son of God come to Earth. The 2nd and 3rd centuries AD saw a sharp separation between Jewish Christianity and Pauline or Gentile Christianity, with the latter being derived from the teachings of the Apostle Paul. There was an explicit rejection of Second Temple Judaism and Jewish culture by the end of the 2nd century, with a growing body of anti-Jewish Christian literature. Many doctrinal variations in this era defy neat categorizations, as various forms of Christianity interacted in a complex fashion.

A third major school of thought was Marcionite Christianity, a dualistic theological system that originated with the teachings of Marcion of Sinope in 2nd-century Rome and held that the Hebrew God of the Old Testament ruled upon the Jews by enslaving them to follow the Mosaic Law, while the Gentiles were saved through divine grace by the Gospel of Jesus Christ, sent by an entirely different Supreme God. A fourth major school of thought was Gnostic Christianity, an elaborate theological system characterized by several emanationist cosmologies and the notion of a "divine spark" trapped in matter, which regarded Jesus Christ as a divine being sent by a supreme, Unknown God who pre-existed and was superior to the malevolent Hebrew God of the Old Testament (which was known as Yaldabaoth and conceived as the Demiurge or false creator of the material universe), and who brought salvation through direct, experiential "knowledge" (gnosis).

During the ante-Nicene period, various local and provincial ancient Church councils were held, with the decisions meeting varying degrees of acceptance by different Christian groups. Major Christian figures of the 2nd century who were later declared by the developing proto-Orthodox faction to be heretics were Marcion, Montanus, and Valentinus. In the 4th and 5th centuries AD, after centuries of intermittent persecution, proto-Orthodox Christianity experienced both pressure and recognition from the Roman State and developed a strong episcopal and unifying structure, leading to its legalization under the Emperor Constantine (313 AD).

== Beliefs and practices ==
Early Christian communities came to adopt some Jewish practices while rejecting others. Marcion, who believed in the total rejection of Judaism and Jewish scriptures, proposed the rejection of the Old Testament in its entirety and all Jewish practices, but he was excommunicated in Rome and declared to be heretical by the growing proto-Orthodox faction (c. 144 AD).

=== Eschatology ===
Christianity "emerged as a sect of Judaism in Roman Judea" in the syncretistic Greco-Roman world of the 1st century AD, which was dominated by Roman law and Hellenistic culture. It started with the ministry of Jesus, who proclaimed the coming of the Kingdom of God. After his death by crucifixion, some of his followers are said to have seen Jesus, and proclaimed him to be alive and resurrected by God. The resurrection of Jesus signified eschatological fulfillment and gave impetus in certain Christian sects to the exaltation of Jesus to the status of divine Son and Lord of God's Kingdom (Note: Larry Hurtado (December 4, 2018), "When Christians were Jews": Paula Fredriksen on "The First Generation") and the resumption of their missionary activity.

The predominant eschatological view in the ante-Nicene period was premillennialism, the belief of a visible reign of Christ in glory on earth with the risen saints for a thousand years, before the general resurrection and Judgement Day. Justin Martyr and Irenaeus were the most outspoken proponents of premillennialism. Justin Martyr saw himself as continuing in the "Jewish" belief of a temporary messianic kingdom prior to the eternal state. Irenaeus devoted Book V of his Against Heresies to a defense of the physical resurrection and eternal judgement.

Other early premillennialists included Pseudo-Barnabas, Papias, Methodius, Lactantius, Commodianus Theophilus, Tertullian, Melito, Hippolytus of Rome, and Victorinus of Pettau.

Eventually, various Christian eschatological systems developed among different Christian denominations throughout the history of Christianity, providing different frameworks for understanding the timing and nature of apocalyptic predictions. By the 3rd century AD, there was growing opposition to premillennialism. Origen was the first to challenge the doctrine openly. Dionysius of Alexandria stood against premillennialism when the chiliastic work, The Refutation of the Allegorizers by Nepos, a bishop in Egypt, became popular in Alexandria, as noted in Eusebius's, Ecclesiastical History. Eusebius said of the premillennialian, Papias, that he was "a man of small mental capacity" because he had taken the Apocalypse literally. According to Dale Allison, in Jewish antiquity less intelligent tanna were deemed more reliable as the intelligent were thought to modify what they were given; Papias's alleged lack of intelligence would not have been a disqualification.

=== Lord's Day ===
According to Bauckham, the post-apostolic Christian Church contained diverse practices as regards the Sabbath. It seems clear that some of the Early Church considered, in addition to keeping the weekly Sabbath, the importance of also worshipping on the Lord's Day. In the Didache, it states "But every Lord's day gather yourselves together, and break bread, and give thanksgiving."

=== Infant baptism ===
Infant baptism was widely practised at least by the 3rd century AD, but it is disputed whether it was in the first centuries of Christianity. Some believe that the Church in the apostolic period practised infant baptism, arguing that the mention of the baptism of households in the Acts of the Apostles would have included children within the household. Others believe that infants were excluded from the baptism of households, citing verses of the Bible that describe the baptized households as believing, which infants are incapable of doing. In the 2nd century AD, Irenaeus, bishop of Lyon, may have referred to it. Additionally, Justin Martyr wrote about baptism in First Apology (written in the mid-second century), describing it as a choice and contrasting it with the lack of choice one has in one's physical birth. However, Justin Martyr also seems to imply elsewhere that believers were "disciples from childhood", indicating, perhaps, their baptism.

The so-called Apostolic Tradition says to "Baptize first the children, and if they can speak for themselves let them do so. Otherwise, let their parents or other relatives speak for them." If it was written by Hippolytus of Rome, Apostolic Tradition could be dated about 215, but recent scholars believe it to be material from separate sources ranging from the middle second to the fourth century, being gathered and compiled about 375–400. The third century evidence is clearer, with both Origen (calling infant baptism "according to the usage of the Church") and Cyprian advocating the practice. Tertullian acknowledges the practice (and that sponsors would speak on behalf of the children), but, holding an unusual view of marriage, argues against it, on the grounds that baptism should be postponed until after marriage.

Interpretation of the baptismal practices of the early church is important to groups such as Baptists, Anabaptists, and the Churches of Christ who believe that infant baptism was a development that occurred during the late second to early third centuries. The early Christian writings mentioned above, which date from the second and third century, indicate that Christians as early as the second century did maintain such a practice.

=== Prayer and worship ===
In Apostolic Tradition, Hippolytus instructed Christians to pray seven times a day, "on rising, at the lighting of the evening lamp, at bedtime, at midnight" and "the third, sixth and ninth hours of the day, being hours associated with Christ's Passion." Christians attended two liturgies on the Lord's Day, worshipping communally in both a morning service and evening service, with the purpose of reading the Scriptures and celebrating the Eucharist. Throughout the rest of the week, Christians assembled at the church every day for morning prayer (which became known as lauds) and evening prayer (which became known as vespers), while praying at the other fixed prayer times privately. This practice of seven fixed prayer times was done in the bodily positions of prostration and standing. Derived from the writings of Saint Paul, Christians employed the orans position in prayer too. A Christian cross on an eastern wall of a dwelling was used to mark the eastward direction of prayer.

=== Holy Kiss ===
Instituted in the New Testament, in the early Church, "the verbal exchange of 'peace' with a kiss appears to be a Christian innovation, there being no clear example in pre-Christian literature." The Holy Kiss was thus followed as a Christian teaching, not a cultural practice. The early Christian apologist Tertullian wrote that before leaving a house, Christians are to give the Holy Kiss and say "peace to this house". In early Christianity, "the kiss was shared in conjunction with the benedictions at the conclusion of worship services" though it soon "became associated with the Eucharist" and thus "its location during the worship service moved forward in time to the celebration of Communion." The Holy Kiss was seen as an essential part of preparing to partaking in the Eucharist:

Peace, reconciliation, and unity were the very essence of the church's life; without them communion would have been a sham. Bestowed by the Spirit and experienced in prayer, their liturgical expression—which pointed forward to the eucharist—was the holy kiss.

For the early Christians, the Holy Kiss "was associated with the peace and unity given by the Holy Spirit to the congregation." To guard against any abuse of this form of salutation, women and men were required to sit separately, and the kiss of peace was given only by women to women and by men to men, with closed mouths. Apostolic Tradition specified with regard to catechumens: "When they have prayed they shall not give the kiss of peace for their kiss is not yet holy" (18:3). As such, the Holy Kiss was distinguished as a ritual only to be partaken of by baptized Christians, with catechumens and non-Christians not being greeted this way (18:4).

=== Attitude towards women ===
The attitude of the Church Fathers towards women paralleled rules in Jewish law regarding a woman's role in worship, although the early church allowed women to participate in worship - something that was not allowed in the Synagogue (where women were restricted to the outer court). The Deutero-Pauline First Epistle to Timothy teaches that women should remain quiet during public worship and were not to instruct men or assume authority over them. The Epistle to the Ephesians, calls upon women to submit to the authority of their husbands, even also the husband to his wife (mutual submission).

Elizabeth A. Clark says that the Church Fathers regarded women both as "God's good gift to men" and as "the curse of the world", both as "weak in both mind and character" and as people who "displayed dauntless courage, undertook prodigious feats of scholarship".

=== Headcovering ===
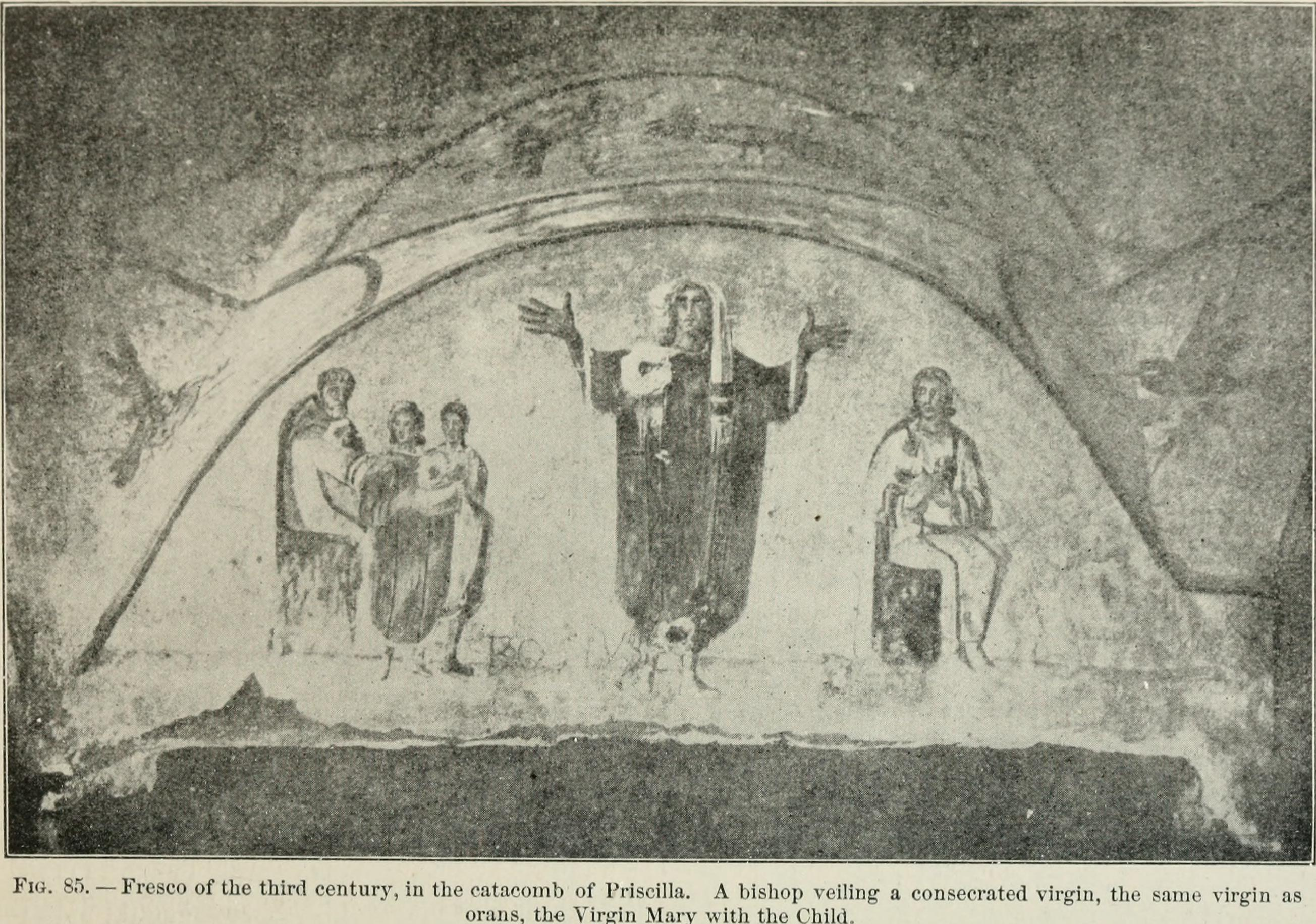
Fresco showing a woman wearing a headcovering praying in the gesture of orans (3rd century)

Christianity in the ante-Nicene period continued the practice of female Christian headcovering (from the age of puberty onward), with early Christian apologist Tertullian referencing 1 Corinthians 11:2–10 and stating "So, too, did the Corinthians themselves understand [Paul]. In fact, at this day the Corinthians do veil their virgins. What the apostles taught, their disciples approve." Hippolytus of Rome specified the type of veil: "And let all the women have their heads covered with an opaque cloth, not with a veil of thin linen, for this is not a true covering."

=== Footwashing ===
The early Christian apologist Tertullian recorded that footwashing was a regular part of Christian worship in the ante-Nicene period. Footwashing was done with a basin "of water for the saints' feet" and a "linen towel". Being commanded in John 13, the early Church Fathers Augustine of Hippo and John Chrysostom held that footwashing is done in imitation of Jesus, a rite also being encouraged by Origen. The early Church Father Clement of Alexandria linked the new sandals given to the Prodigal Son with feetwashing, describing "non-perishable shoes that are only fit to be worn by those who have had their feet washed by Jesus, the Teacher and Lord." The early Church thus saw footwashing to be connected to repentance, involving a spiritual cleansing by Jesus.

=== Date of Easter ===
Eastern and Western Mediterranean Christians had a history of differences and disagreements dating back to the second century. Among the most significant early disagreements is the Quartodecimanism controversy. Until the late second century there was a difference in dating the celebration of the Christian Passover/Easter between Western churches and those of Asia Minor. The churches in Asia Minor celebrated it on the 14th of the Jewish month of Nisan, the day before Jewish Passover, regardless of what day of the week it fell on, as the Crucifixion had occurred on the day before Passover according to the Gospel of John. The Latins called them Quartodecimans, literally meaning 14'ers. At the time, the West celebrated Easter on the Sunday following the Jewish 14th of Nisan.

Victor, the bishop of Rome, attempted to declare the Nisan 14 practice heretical and excommunicate all who followed it. On this occasion Irenaeus and Polycrates of Ephesus wrote to Victor. Irenaeus reminded Victor of his predecessor's more tolerant attitude and Polycrates emphatically defended the Asian practice. Victor's "excommunication" of the Asians was apparently rescinded, and the two sides reconciled as a result of the intervention of Irenaeus and other bishops, including Tertullian. Both Tertullian and Irenaeus were pupils of Polycarp, who was a student of the Apostle John and, according to Polycarp's own written words, was also a "hearer" of the other Apostles. Polycarp was a bishop in Smyrna.

Eusebius later claimed that synods and conferences of bishops were convened, which ruled "without a dissenting voice" in support of Easter on Sunday. A uniform method of computing the date of Easter was not formally addressed until 325 at the First Council of Nicaea. Today, the date still varies between West and East, but this is because the West later adopted the Gregorian calendar over the Julian calendar.

=== Monasticism ===
Institutional Christian monasticism seems to have begun in the 3rd-century Roman Egypt as a kind of living matyrdom in the desert. Anthony the Great (251-356) was the first to specifically leave the world and live in the desert as a monk. Anthony lived as a hermit in the desert and gradually gained followers who lived as hermits nearby but not in actual community with him. One such, Paul the Hermit (also known as Paul of Thebes, c.226/7-c.341) lived in absolute solitude not very far from Anthony and was looked upon even by Anthony as a perfect monk. Paul had gone into the desert before Anthony, but to escape persecution rather than for the purpose of pursuing God. This type of monasticism is called eremitical or "hermit-like". Pachomius of Thebes (c. 292–348) is traditionally considered the founder of cenobitic monasticism, in which monks live in communities isolated from the world but not from each other.

As monasticism spread in the East from the hermits living in the deserts of Egypt to Palestine, Syria, and on up into Asia Minor and beyond, the sayings (apophthegmata) and acts (praxeis) of the Desert Fathers came to be recorded and circulated, first among their fellow monastics and then among the laity as well.

=== Early Christian iconography ===
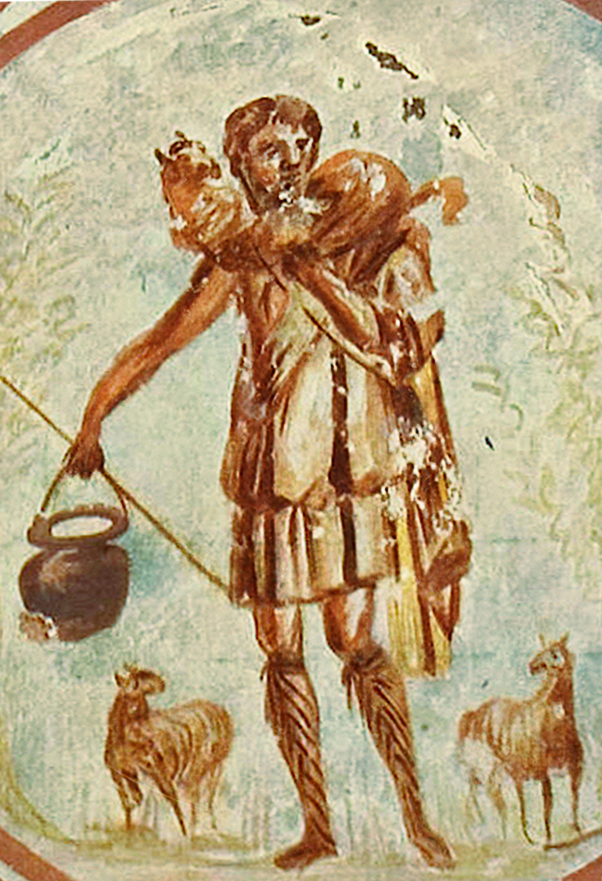
Christ Jesus, the Good Shepherd, third century.

Christian art emerged only relatively late. According to art historian André Grabar, the first known Christian images emerge from about AD 200, though there is some literary evidence that small domestic images were used earlier. Although many Hellenised Jews seem, as at the Dura-Europos synagogue, to have had images of religious figures, the traditional Mosaic prohibition of "graven images" no doubt retained some effect. This early rejection of images, although never proclaimed by theologians, and the necessity to hide Christian practice in order to avoid persecution, leaves few archaeological records regarding Early Christianity and its evolution. The oldest Christian paintings are from the Roman Catacombs, dated to about 200, and the oldest Christian sculptures are from sarcophagi, dating to the beginning of the third century.

== Diversity and proto-Orthodoxy ==
The development of doctrine, the position of proto-Orthodoxy, and the relationship between the various opinions is a matter of continuing academic debate. Since the Nicene Creed came to define the Church, the early debates have long been regarded as a unified orthodox position against a minority of heretics. Walter Bauer, drawing upon distinctions between Jewish Christians, Pauline Christians, Christian Gnostics, and Marcionites, argued that early Christianity was fragmented, with various competing interpretations, only one of them eventually coming to dominate. While Bauer's original thesis has been criticised, Elaine Pagels and Bart Ehrman have further explicated the existence of variant Christianities in the first centuries. They see early Christianity as fragmented into contemporaneous competing orthodoxies.

Eamon Duffy notes that Christianity throughout the Roman Empire was "in a state of violent creative ferment" during the second century. Orthodoxy, or proto-orthodoxy, existed alongside forms of Christianity that they would soon consider deviant "heresy". Duffy considers the orthodox and unorthodox were sometimes difficult to distinguish during this period, and simply says that early Christianity in Rome had a wide variety of competing Christian sects.

Some orthodox scholars argue against the increasing focus on heterodoxy. A movement away from presuming the correctness or dominance of the orthodoxy is seen as neutral, but criticize historical analysis that assumes heterodox sects are superior to the orthodox movement.

=== Growth of Christianity ===
Rodney Stark estimates that the number of Christians grew by approximately 40% a decade during the first and second centuries. This phenomenal growth rate forced Christian communities to evolve in order to adapt to their changes in the nature of their communities as well as their relationship with their political and socioeconomic environment. As the number of Christians grew, the Christian communities became larger, more numerous and farther apart geographically. The passage of time also moved some Christians farther from the original teachings of the apostles giving rise to teachings that were considered heterodox and sowing controversy and divisiveness within churches and between churches. Classical writers mistook early congregations for burial or fraternal societies which had similar characteristics like divine worship, common meals, regular meetings, initiation, rules for conduct, and their own burial grounds.

=== Variations in theology ===
The Ante-Nicene period saw the rise of a great number of Christian sects, cults and movements with strong unifying characteristics lacking in the apostolic period. They had different interpretations of Scripture, particularly different Christology - questions about the divinity of Jesus and salvation from the consequences of sin - and the nature of (or existence of) a Trinity. Many variations in this time defy neat categorizations, as various forms of Christianity interacted in a complex fashion to form the dynamic character of Christianity in this era. The Post-Apostolic period was extremely diverse both in terms of beliefs and practices. In addition to the broad spectrum of general branches of Christianity, there was constant change and diversity that variably resulted in both internecine conflicts and syncretic adoption.

These various interpretations were called heresies by the leaders of the proto-orthodox church, just as the Proto-orthodox was considered heretical by the other variants. Many forms of Christianity were very popular and had large followings. Part of the unifying trend in proto-orthodoxy was an increasingly harsh anti-Judaism and rejection of Judaizers. Some of the major movements were:

- Gnosticism – second to fourth centuries – reliance on revealed knowledge from an unknowable God, a distinct divinity from the Demiurge who created and oversees the material world. The Gnostics claimed to have received secret teachings (gnosis) from Jesus via other apostles which were not publicly known, or in the case of Valentinius from Paul the Apostle. Gnosticism is predicated on the existence of such hidden knowledge, but brief references to private teachings of Jesus have also survived in the canonic scripture (Mark 4:11) as did warning by the Christ that there would be false prophets or false teachers. Irenaeus' opponents also claimed that the wellsprings of divine inspiration were not dried up. This is the doctrine of continuing revelation.
- Marcionism – second century – the God of Jesus was a different God from the God of the Old Testament.
- Montanism – second century – a pentecostal movement initiated by Montanus and his female disciples, featuring prophetic continuing revelations from the Holy Spirit.
- Adoptionism – first to second century – Jesus was not born the Son of God, but was adopted at his baptism, resurrection or ascension.
- Docetism – second to third century – Jesus was pure spirit and his physical form an illusion.
- Sabellianism – third century – the Father, Son, and Holy Spirit are three modes of the one God and not the three separate persons of the Trinity.
- Arianism – third to fourth century – Jesus, while not merely mortal, was not eternally divine and was of some lesser status than God the Father. (Note: John 14:28)

In the middle of the second century, the Christian communities of Rome, for example, were divided between followers of Marcion, Montanism, and the gnostic teachings of Valentinus.

Many groups were dualistic, maintaining that reality was composed into two radically opposing parts: matter, usually seen as evil, and spirit, seen as good. Proto-orthodox Christianity, on the other hand, held that both the material and spiritual worlds were created by God and were therefore both good, and that this was represented in the unified divine and human natures of Christ. Trinitarianism held that God the Father, God the Son, and the Holy Spirit were all strictly one being with three hypostases.

=== Proto-orthodoxy ===
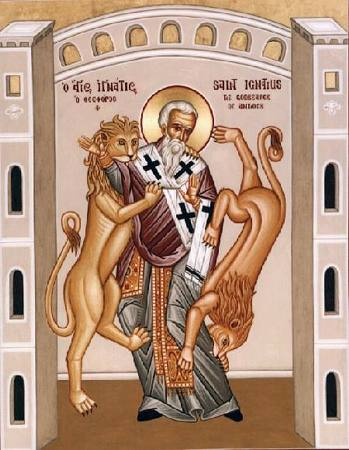
Ignatius of Antioch, one of the Apostolic Fathers and the third Bishop of Antioch, was considered a student of John the Apostle. En route to his martyrdom in Rome (c. 108), Ignatius wrote a series of preserved letters which are examples of late-1st to early-second-century Christian theology.

Christianity differed from Roman religions in that it set out its beliefs in a clearly defined way. The process of determining orthodoxy (right belief) began with the writings of the New Testament and continued through the period of the first seven ecumenical councils. Orthodox teachings were those that claimed to have the authentic lineage of Holy Tradition. All other teachings were viewed as deviant streams of thought that were sometimes viewed as heretical.

Early attacks upon alleged heresies formed the matter of Tertullian's Prescription Against Heretics (in 44 chapters, written from Rome), and of Irenaeus' Against Heresies (c. 180, in five volumes), written in Lugdunum (modern Lyon) after his return from a visit to Rome. The letters of Ignatius of Antioch and Polycarp of Smyrna to various churches warned against false teachers, and the Epistle of Barnabas warned about mixing Judaism with Christianity, as did other writers. The First Council of Nicaea was convoked by Emperor Constantine at Nicaea in 325 in response to disruptive polemical controversies within the Christian community over the nature of the Trinity caused by Arius, who denied the eternal nature of Christ as put forth in the Gospel of John.

==== Developing Church hierarchy ====
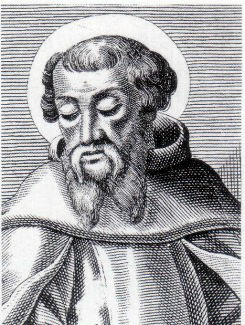
Irenaeus wrote On the Detection and Overthrow of the So-Called Gnosis.

In the post-Apostolic church, bishops emerged as overseers of urban Christian populations, and a hierarchy clergy gradually took on the form of episkopos (overseers, bishops), presbyters (elders), and then deacons (servants).

A hierarchy within Pauline Christianity seems to have developed by the late 1st century and early second century. (see Pastoral Epistles, c. 90–140) Robert Williams posits that the "origin and earliest development of episcopacy and monepiscopacy and the ecclesiastical concept of (apostolic) succession were associated with crisis situations in the early church." While New Testament writers use the terms overseer and elder interchangeably, an episcopal structure becomes more visible in the second century.

Roger Haight posits the development of ecclesiology in the form of "Early Catholicism" as one response to the problem of church unity. Thus, the solution to division arising from heterodox teaching was the development of "tighter and more standardized structures of ministry. One of these structures is the tri-partite form of church leadership consisting of episkopoi (overseers); presbyteroi (elders), as was the case with Jewish communities; and diakonoi (ministerial servants). Presbyters were ordained and assisted the bishop; as Christianity spread, especially in rural areas, the presbyters exercised more responsibilities and took distinctive shape as priests. Deacons also performed certain duties, such as tending to the poor and sick.

Much of the official organizing of the ecclesiastical structure was done by the bishops of the church. This tradition of clarification can be seen as established by the Apostolic Fathers, who were bishops themselves.

The Catholic Encyclopedia argues that although evidence is scarce in the second century, the primacy of the Church of Rome is asserted by Irenaeus of Lyon's document Against Heresies (AD 189). In response to second century Gnostic teaching, Irenaeus created the first known document considered to be describing apostolic succession, including the immediate successors of Peter and Paul: Linus, Anacleutus, Clement, Evaristus, Alexander, and Sixtus. The Catholic Church considers these men to be the first popes, through whom later popes would claim authority. In apostolic succession, a bishop becomes the spiritual successor of the previous bishop in a line tracing back to the apostles themselves. Over the course of the second century, this organizational structure became universal and continues to be used in the Catholic, Orthodox and Anglican (Anglican churches are Protestant) churches as well as in some Protestant denominations.

==== Important Church centers ====
Jerusalem was an important church center up to 135. It had the prestige of being the city of Jesus's death and reported resurrection, and was the center of the Apostolic Age, but it experienced decline during the years of the Jewish–Roman wars (66-135). The First Council of Nicaea recognized and confirmed the tradition by which Jerusalem continued to be given "special honour", but did not assign to it even metropolitan authority within its own province, still less the extraprovincial jurisdiction exercised by Rome and the other sees mentioned above.

Constantinople came into prominence only after the early Christian period, being founded officially in 330, five years after the First Council of Nicaea, though the much smaller original city of Byzantium was an early center of Christianity largely due to its proximity to Anatolia.

The community and seat of the patriarchate according to Orthodox tradition was founded by St Peter and then given to St. Ignatius, in what is now Turkey.

==== Rome and the Papacy ====
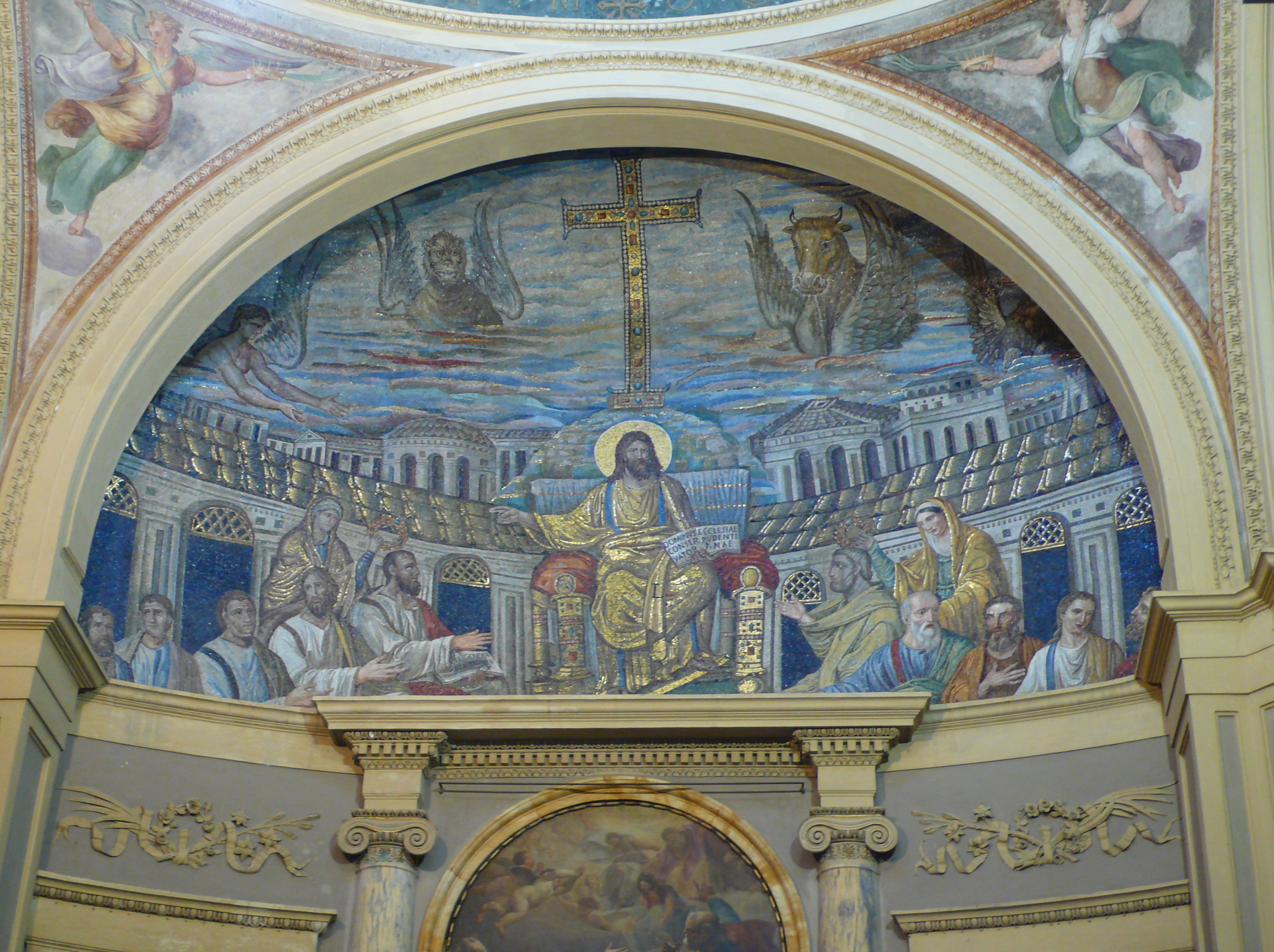
A scene showing Christ Pantocrator from a Roman mosaic in the church of Santa Pudenziana in Rome, c. 410 AD

Irenaeus of Lyon believed in the second century that Peter and Paul had been the founders of the Church in Rome and had appointed Linus as succeeding bishop.

The four Eastern patriarchs affirmed Saint Peter's ministry and death in Rome and the apostolic succession of Roman bishops. However, they perceived this as a mark of honor rather than an overarching authority over belief and practices, as they still considered themselves to be the final authorities in their own regions, see for example Metropolitan bishops and Pentarchy, yet still under the overall guidance of the bishop of Rome. Other patriarchs did turn to Rome for support in settling disputes, but they also wrote to other influential patriarchs for support in the same fashion. Outside of a few notable exceptions, the body of literature left from this period, and even as late as the 5th and 6th centuries, is said by Bernhard Schimmelpfennig to illustrate the generally limited scope of the Roman bishops' authority but acknowledged the authority nonetheless.

William Kling states that by the end of second century that Rome was a significant, if not unique, early center of Christianity, but held no convincing claim to primacy. The Petrine proof text first occurs historically in a dispute between Cyprian of Carthage and Pope Stephen. A bishop from Caesarea named Firmilian sided with Cyprian in his dispute, seething against Stephen's "insulting arrogance" and claims of authority based on the See of Peter. Cyprian's argument won out the day, with Pope Stephen's claims meeting rejection.

Cyprian's claim was that bishops held the keys to the forgiveness of sins, with all bishops being the successors of Saint Peter. Jerome later took up the argument for the primacy of the Roman bishop in the 5th century, a position adopted by Pope Leo I.

By the end of the early Christian period, the church within the Roman Empire had hundreds of bishops, some of them (Rome, Alexandria, Antioch, "other provinces") holding some form of jurisdiction over others.

== Development of the Christian Canon ==
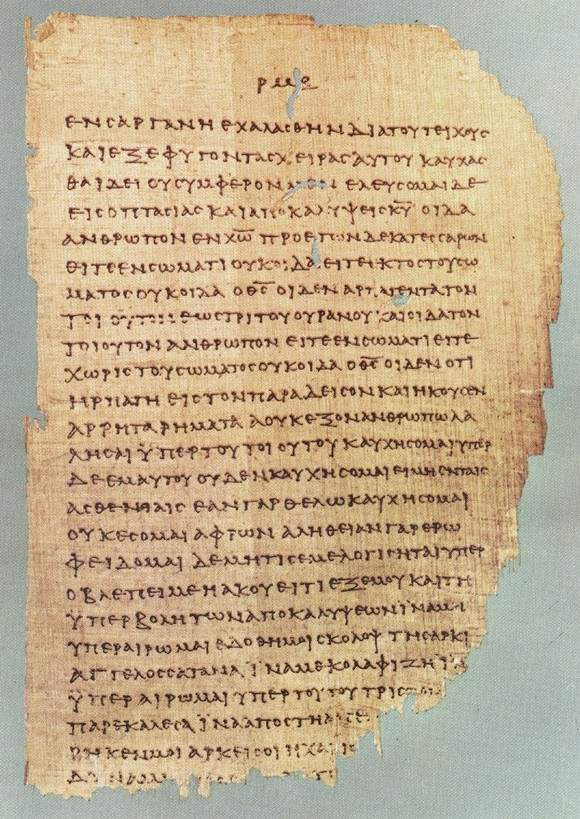
A folio from P46, an early 3rd-century collection of Pauline epistles.

The books of the canon of the New Testament, which includes the Canonical Gospels, Acts, letters of the Apostles, and Revelation were written before 120 AD, but not defined as "canon" by the orthodox mainstream until the 4th century.

The writings attributed to the apostles circulated amongst the earliest Christian communities. The Pauline epistles were circulating in collected forms by the end of the 1st century AD. The earliest mention of the gospels is found in the First Apology (c155) of Justin Martyr, who mentions the "memoirs of the apostles" which Christians called "gospels" and which were regarded as on par with the Old Testament. A four gospel canon (the Tetramorph) was asserted by Ireanaeus, who refers to it directly.

Debates about scripture were underway in the mid-second century, concurrent with a drastic increase of new scriptures, both Jewish and Christian. Debates regarding practice and belief gradually became reliant on the use of scripture other than what Melito referred to as the Old Testament, as the New Testament canon developed. Similarly, in the third century a shift away from direct revelation as a source of authority occurred, most notably against the Montanists. "Scripture" still had a broad meaning and usually referred to the Septuagint among Greek speakers or the Targums among Aramaic speakers or the Vetus Latina translations in Carthage. Beyond the Torah (the Law) and some of the earliest prophetic works (the Prophets), there was not agreement on the canon, but this was not debated much at first.

Some theorize that the split of early Christianity and Judaism in the mid-second century eventually led to the determination of a Jewish canon by the emerging rabbinic movement, though, even as of today, there is no scholarly consensus as to when the Jewish canon was set. For example, some scholars argue that the Jewish canon was fixed earlier, by the Hasmonean dynasty (140–137 BC). There is a lack of direct evidence on when Christians began accepting their own scriptures alongside the Septuagint. Well into the second century Christians held onto a strong preference for oral tradition as clearly demonstrated by writers of the time, such as Papias.

The oldest list of books for the New Testament canon is the Muratorian fragment dating to c. 170. It shows that by 200 there existed a set of Christian writings somewhat similar to what is now the 27-book New Testament, which included the four gospels.

By the early 200's, Origen of Alexandria may have been using the same 27 books as in the modern New Testament, though there were still disputes over the canonicity of Hebrews, James, II Peter, II John and III John, and Revelation, referred to as the Antilegomena (following Eusebius).

== Early orthodox writings – Church Fathers ==
Since the end of the 4th century, the title "Fathers of the Church" has been used to refer to a more or less clearly defined group of ecclesiastical writers who are appealed to as authorities on doctrinal matters. They are the early and influential theologians and writers in the early Christian Church, who had strong influence on the development of proto-orthodoxy. They produced two sorts of works: theological and "apologetic", the latter being works aimed at defending the faith by using reason to refute arguments against the veracity of Christianity.

=== Apologists ===
In the face of criticism from Greek philosophers and facing persecution, apologists wrote to justify and defend Christian doctrine. Justin Martyr's works represent the earliest surviving Christian "apologies" of notable size.

=== Apostolic Fathers ===
The earliest Church Fathers (within two generations of the Twelve apostles of Christ) are usually called the Apostolic Fathers, for reportedly knowing and having studied under the apostles personally. Important Apostolic Fathers of the second century include Pope Clement I (died 99), Ignatius of Antioch (c. 35 – c. 110), and Polycarp of Smyrna (c. 69 – c. 155). In addition, the Shepherd of Hermas is usually placed among the writings of the Apostolic Fathers although its author is unknown.

Ignatius of Antioch (also known as Theophorus) was the third Bishop or Patriarch of Antioch and a student of the Apostle John. En route to his martyrdom in Rome, Ignatius wrote a series of letters which have been preserved as an example of the theology of the earliest Christians. Important topics addressed in these letters include ecclesiology, the sacraments, the role of bishops, and Biblical Sabbath. He is the second after Clement to mention Paul's epistles.

Polycarp of Smyrna was a bishop of Smyrna (now İzmir in Turkey). It is recorded that he had been a disciple of John. The options for this John are John the son of Zebedee traditionally viewed as the author of the fourth Gospel, or John the Presbyter. Traditional advocates follow Eusebius in insisting that the apostolic connection of Papius was with John the Evangelist, and that this John, the author of the Gospel of John, was the same as the Apostle John. Polycarp, c 156, tried and failed to persuade Anicetus, Bishop of Rome, to have the West celebrate Easter on 14 Nisan, as in the East. He rejected the pope's suggestion that the East use the Western date. In 155, the Smyrnans demanded Polycarp's execution, and he died a martyr. Legend states that the flames built to kill him refused to burn him, and that when he was stabbed to death; so much blood issued from his body that it quenched the flames around him.

The Shepherd of Hermas was popular in the early church, considered a valuable book by many Christians, and considered canonical scripture by some of the early Church fathers. It was written at Rome, in Greek. The Shepherd had great authority in the second and third centuries. It was cited as Scripture by Irenaeus and Tertullian and was bound with the New Testament in the Codex Sinaiticus, and it was listed between the Acts of the Apostles and the Acts of Paul in the stichometrical list of the Codex Claromontanus. Other early Christians, however, considered the work to be apocryphal.

=== Greek Fathers ===
Those who wrote in Greek are called the Greek (Church) Fathers. Famous Greek Fathers of second century (other than the Apostolic Fathers) include: Irenaeus of Lyon and Clement of Alexandria.

Irenaeus of Lyon (c.130–c.202 AD) was bishop of Lugdunum in Gaul, which is now Lyon, France. His writings were formative in the early development of Christian theology, and he is recognized as a saint by both the Eastern Orthodox Church and the Roman Catholic Church. He was a notable early apologetic. He was also a disciple of Polycarp, who was said to be a disciple of John the Evangelist. His best-known book, Against Heresies (c. 180) enumerated heresies and attacked them. Irenaeus wrote that the only way for Christians to retain unity was to humbly accept one doctrinal authority - episcopal councils. Irenaeus was the first to propose that all four gospels be accepted as canonical.

Clement of Alexandria (c.150–c.215) was a Christian theologian and the head of the noted Catechetical School of Alexandria and was well-versed in pagan literature. Clement is best remembered as the teacher of Origen. He used the term "gnostic" for Christians who had attained the deeper teaching of the Logos. He combined Greek philosophical traditions with Christian doctrine and developed a Christian Platonism. He presented the goal of Christian life as deification, identified both as Platonism's assimilation into God and the biblical imitation of God.

According to tradition, Origen (184 – 253) was an Egyptian who taught in Alexandria, reviving the Catechetical School where Clement had taught. Using his knowledge of Hebrew, he produced a corrected Septuagint, and wrote commentaries on all the books of the Bible. In Peri Archon (First Principles), he articulated the first philosophical exposition of Christian doctrine. He interpreted scripture allegorically, showing Stoic, Neo-Pythagorean, and Platonic influences. Like Plotinus, he wrote that the soul passes through successive stages before incarnation as a human and after death, eventually reaching God. He imagined even demons being reunited with God. For Origen, God was not Yahweh but the First Principle, and Christ, the Logos, was subordinate to him. His views of a hierarchical structure in the Trinity, the temporality of matter, "the fabulous preexistence of souls", and "the monstrous restoration which follows from it" were declared anathema in the 6th century. The patriarch of Alexandria at first supported Origen but later expelled him for being ordained without the patriarch's permission. He relocated to Caesarea Maritima and died there after being tortured during a persecution.

Hippolytus of Rome (c. 170–235 AD) was one of the most prolific writers of early Christianity. Hippolytus was born during the second half of the second century, probably in Rome. Photius describes him in his Bibliotheca (cod. 121) as a disciple of Irenaeus, who was said to be a disciple of Polycarp, and from the context of this passage it is supposed that he suggested that Hippolytus so styled himself. However, this assertion is doubtful. He came into conflict with the Popes of his time and for some time headed a separate group. For that reason he is sometimes considered the first Antipope. However he died in 235 or 236 reconciled to the Church and as a martyr.

=== Latin Fathers ===
Church Fathers who wrote in Latin are called the Latin (Church) Fathers.

Tertullian (c.155–c.240 AD), who was converted to Christianity before 197, was a prolific writer of apologetic, theological, controversial and ascetic works. He wrote three books in Greek and was the first great writer of Latin Christianity, and so is sometimes known as the "Father of the Latin Church". He was evidently a lawyer in Rome and thought to be the son of a Roman centurion. Tertullian is said to have introduced the Latin term "trinitas" with regard to the Divine (Trinity) to the Christian vocabulary (but Theophilus of Antioch already wrote of "the Trinity, of God, and His Word, and His wisdom", which is similar but not identical to the Trinitarian wording), and also probably the formula "three Persons, one Substance" as the Latin "tres Personae, una Substantia" (itself from the Koine Greek "treis Hypostases, Homoousios"), and also the terms "vetus testamentum" (Old Testament) and "novum testamentum" (New Testament). In his Apologeticus, he was the first Latin author who qualified Christianity as the "vera religio" (true religion) and systematically relegated the classical Roman Empire religion and other accepted cults to the position of mere "superstitions". Tertullian denounced Christian doctrines he considered heretical, but later in life, Tertullian is thought by most to have joined the Montanists, a heretical sect that appealed to his rigorism.

Cyprian (200-258) was bishop of Carthage and an important early Christian writer. He was probably born at the beginning of the third century in North Africa, perhaps at Carthage, where he received an excellent classical education. After converting to Christianity, he became a bishop in 249 and eventually died a martyr at Carthage.

== Persecutions and legalization ==
There was no empire-wide persecution of Christians until the reign of Decius in the third century. (Note: Martin, D. 2010. The "Afterlife" of the New Testament and Postmodern Interpretation (lecture transcript). Yale University.) As the Roman Empire experienced the Crisis of the Third Century, the emperor Decius enacted measures intended to restore stability and unity, including a requirement that Roman citizens affirm their loyalty through religious ceremonies pertaining to Imperial cult. In 212, universal citizenship had been granted to all freeborn inhabitants of the empire, and with the edict of Decius enforcing religious conformity in 250, Christian citizens faced an intractable conflict: any citizen who refused to participate in the empire-wide supplicatio was subject to the death penalty. Although lasting only a year, the Decian persecution was a severe departure from previous imperial policy that Christians were not to be sought out and prosecuted as inherently disloyal. Even under Decius, orthodox Christians were subject to arrest only for their refusal to participate in Roman civic religion, and were not prohibited from assembling for worship. Gnostics seem not to have been persecuted.

Christianity flourished during the four decades known as the "Little Peace of the Church", beginning with the reign of Gallienus (253–268), who issued the first official edict of tolerance regarding Christianity. The era of coexistence ended when Diocletian launched the final and "Great" Persecution in 303.

The Edict of Serdica was issued in 311 by the Roman emperor Galerius, officially ending the Diocletianic persecution of Christianity in the East. With the passage in AD 313 of the Edict of Milan, in which the Roman Emperors Constantine the Great and Licinius legalised the Christian religion, persecution of Christians by the Roman state ceased.

== Spread of Christianity ==
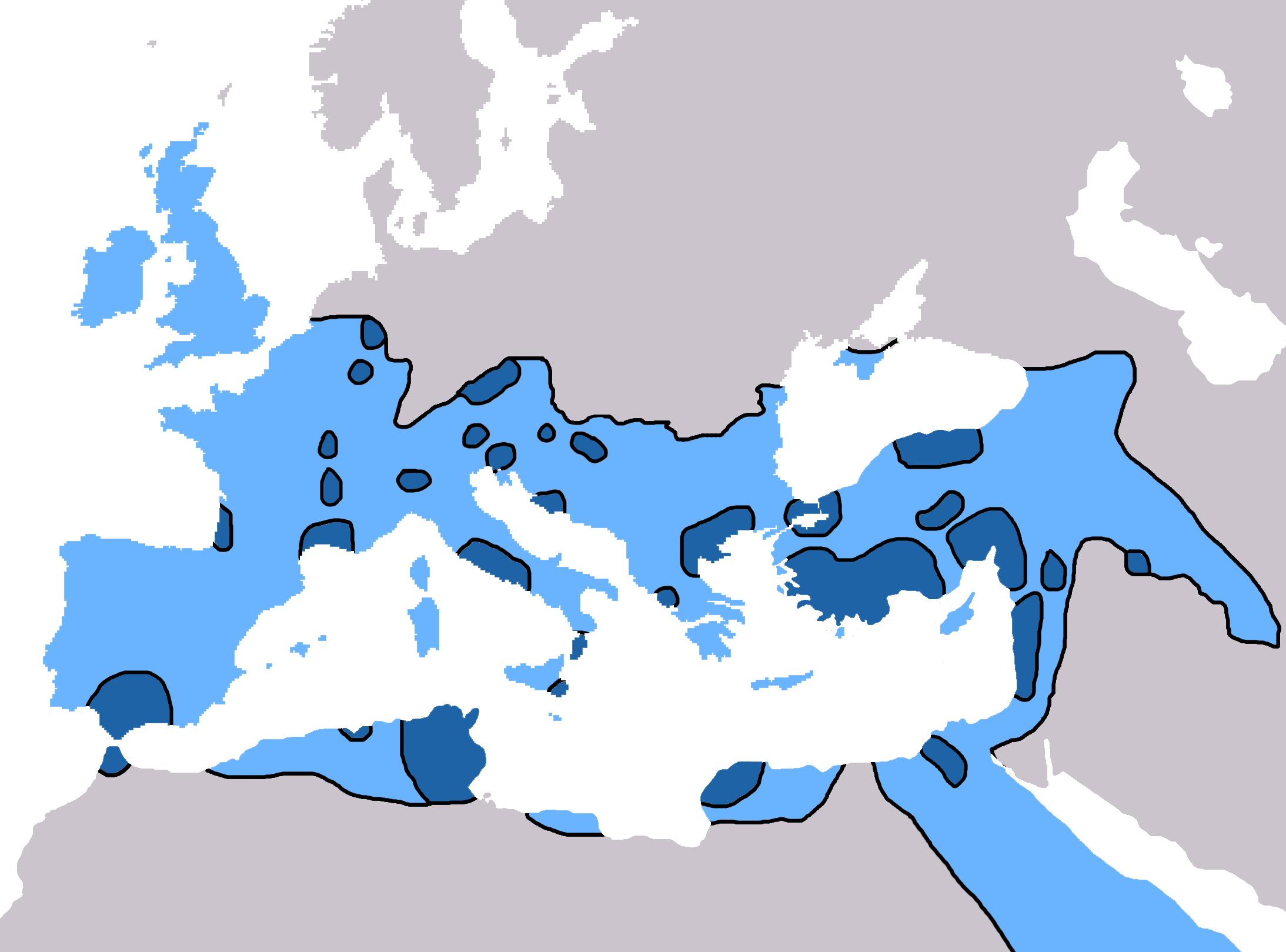
Spread of Christianity to AD 325 Spread of Christianity to AD 600

Christianity spread to Aramaic-speaking peoples along the Mediterranean coast and also to the inland parts of the Roman Empire, and beyond that into the Parthian Empire and the later Sasanian Empire, including Mesopotamia, which was dominated at different times and to varying extents by these empires. In AD 301, the Kingdom of Armenia became the first state to declare Christianity as its state religion, following the conversion of the Royal House of the Arsacids in Armenia. With Christianity the dominant faith in some urban centers, Christians accounted for approximately 10% of the Roman population by 300, according to some estimates. According to Rodney Stark, Christianity then rapidly grew in the 4th century with an average growth of 40% per decade (or 3.42% per year); by 350, Christians accounted for 56.5% of the Roman population.

By the latter half of the second century, Christianity had spread east throughout Media, Persia, Parthia, and Bactria. The twenty bishops and many presbyters were more of the order of itinerant missionaries, passing from place to place as Paul did and supplying their needs with such occupations as merchant or craftsman.

Various theories attempt to explain how Christianity managed to spread so successfully prior to the Edict of Milan (313). In The Rise of Christianity, Rodney Stark argues that Christianity replaced paganism chiefly because it improved the lives of its adherents in various ways. Dag Øistein Endsjø argues that Christianity was helped by its promise of a general resurrection of the dead at the end of the world which was compatible with the traditional Greek belief that true immortality depended on the survival of the body. According to Will Durant, the Christian Church prevailed over paganism because it offered a much more attractive doctrine, and because the church leaders addressed human needs better than their rivals.

Bart D. Ehrman attributes the rapid spread of Christianity to five factors: (1) the promise of salvation and eternal life for everyone was an attractive alternative to Roman religions; (2) stories of miracles and healings purportedly showed that the one Christian God was more powerful than the many Roman gods; (3) Christianity began as a grassroots movement providing hope of a better future in the next life for the lower classes; (4) Christianity took worshipers away from other religions since converts were expected to give up the worship of other gods, unusual in antiquity where worship of many gods was common; (5) in the Roman world, converting one person often meant converting the whole household - if the head of the household was converted, he decided the religion of his wife, children and slaves.

== See also ==
- Ante-Nicene Fathers (book)
- Ancient church councils (pre-ecumenical)
- Christianity and Judaism
- Christian martyrs
- Christian monasticism
- Christianization
- Chronological list of saints in the 2nd century
- Chronological list of saints in the 3rd century
- Descriptions in antiquity of the execution cross
- Diversity in early Christian theology
- Early centers of Christianity
- Early Christian art and architecture
- Great Church
- Hellenistic Judaism
- History of Calvinist-Arminian debate
- History of Christian theology
- History of Christianity
- History of Oriental Orthodoxy
- History of the Roman Catholic Church
- History of the Eastern Orthodox Church
- Historiography of early Christianity
- List of Church Fathers
- Persecution of Christians in the New Testament
- Persecution of Christians in the Roman Empire
- Split of Christianity and Judaism
- Timeline of Christian missions#Early Christianity
- Timeline of Christianity#Ante-Nicene period
- Timeline of Eastern Orthodoxy in Greece (33–717)
- Timeline of the Roman Catholic Church

== Sources ==
=== Printed sources ===
- Bird, Michael F. (2017), Jesus the Eternal Son: Answering Adoptionist Christology, Wim. B. Eerdmans Publishing
- Bermejo-Rubio, Fernando (2017), "The Process of Jesus' Deification and Cognitive Dissonance Theory", Numen, 64 (2–3): 119–152, doi:10.1163/15685276-12341457
- Bockmuehl, Markus N. A. (2010), The Remembered Peter: In Ancient Reception and Modern Debate, Mohr Siebeck
- Bokenkotter, Thomas (2004), A Concise History of the Catholic Church, Doubleday, ISBN 0-385-50584-1
- Bourgel, Jonathan (2010), "The Jewish Christians' Move from Jerusalem as a Pragmatic Choice", in Jaffé, Dan (ed.), Kaiphas: der Hohepriester jenes Jahres : Geschichte und Deutung, BRILL, ISBN 978-90-04-18410-7; see also academia.edu
- Burkett, Delbert (2002), An Introduction to the New Testament and the Origins of Christianity, Cambridge University Press, ISBN 978-0-521-00720-7
- Cook, John Granger (2011). Roman Attitudes Toward the Christians: From Claudius to Hadrian. Mohr Siebeck. ISBN 978-3-16-150954-4.
- Croix, G. E. M. de Sainte (1963). "Why Were The Early Christians Persecuted?". Past and Present (26): 6–38. doi:10.1093/past/26.1.6.
- Croix, G. E. M. de Sainte (2006), Whitby, Michael (ed.), Christian Persecution, Martyrdom, And Orthodoxy, Oxford University Press, ISBN 0-19-927812-1
- Davidson, Ivor J., The Birth of the Church: From Jesus to Constantine, A.D. 30-312, Baker Books (2004)
- Dauphin, C. "De l'Église de la circoncision à l'Église de la gentilité – sur une nouvelle voie hors de l'impasse". Studium Biblicum Franciscanum. Liber Annuus XLIII (1993).
- De Conick, April D. (2006), "What Is Early Christian and Jewish Mysticism?", in De Conick, April D. (ed.), Paradise Now: Essays on Early Jewish and Christian Mysticism, SBL, ISBN 9781589832572
- Dunn, James D.G. (1982), The New Perspective on Paul. Manson Memorial Lecture, 4 november 1982
- Dunn, James (1992), Jews and Christians, Wm. B. Eerdmans Publishing, ISBN 978-0-8028-4498-9
- Dunn, James D.G. (2009), Christianity in the Making Volume 2: Beginning from Jerusalem, Wm. B. Eerdmans Publishing
- Durant, Will (2011). Caesar and Christ: The Story of Civilization. Simon and Schuster. ISBN 978-1-4516-4760-0.
- Eddy, Paul Rhodes; Boyd, Gregory A. (2007), The Jesus Legend: A Case for the Historical Reliability of the Synoptic Jesus Tradition, Baker Academic, ISBN 978-0-8010-3114-4
- Ehrman, Bart D. (2006). Whose Word is It?: The Story Behind Who Changed The New Testament and Why. A&C Black. ISBN 978-0-8264-9129-9.
- Ehrman, Bart (2006b), Peter, Paul, and Mary Magdalene: The Followers of Jesus in History and Legend, Oxford University Press, USA, ISBN 0-19-530013-0
- Ehrman, Bart D. (2008). A Brief Introduction to the New Testament. Oxford University Press. ISBN 978-0-19-536934-2.
- Ehrman, Bart D. (2012). Did Jesus Exist?: The Historical Argument for Jesus of Nazareth. HarperCollins. ISBN 978-0-06-208994-6.
- Ehrman, Bart (2014), How Jesus became God: The Exaltation of a Jewish Preacher from Galilee, Harper Collins
- Elwell, Walter; Comfort, Philip Wesley (2001), Tyndale Bible Dictionary, Tyndale House Publishers, ISBN 0-8423-7089-7
- Esler, Philip F. The Early Christian World. Routledge (2004). ISBN 0-415-33312-1
- Fee, Gordon; Stuart, Douglas (2014). How to Read the Bible for All Its Worth: Fourth Edition. Zondervan. ISBN 978-0-310-51783-2.
- Ferguson, Everett, "Factors leading to the Selection and Closure of the New Testament Canon", in The Canon Debate. eds. L. M. McDonald & J. A. Sanders (Hendrickson, 2002)
- Finlan, Stephen (2004), The Background and Content of Paul's Cultic Atonement Metaphors, Society of Biblical Literature
- Fredriksen, Paula (2018), When Christians Were Jews: The First Generation, Yale University Press
- Grant, M. (1977), Jesus: An Historian's Review of the Gospels, New York: Scribner's
- Harris, Stephen L. Understanding the Bible. Mayfield (1985). ISBN 0-87484-696-X.
- Henderson, John B. (1998). The Construction of Orthodoxy and Heresy: Neo-Confucian, Islamic, Jewish, and Early Christian Patterns. Albany, NY: State University of New York Press. ISBN 9780791437599.
- Hunt, Emily Jane. Christianity in the Second Century: The Case of Tatian. Routledge (2003). ISBN 0-415-30405-9
- Hurtado, Larry (2005), Lord Jesus Christ: Devotion to Jesus in Earliest Christianity, Eerdmans
- Jacomb-Hood, Anthony. Rediscovering the New Testament Church. CreateSpace (2014). ISBN 978-1978377585
- Koester, Helmut (2000), Introduction to the New Testament, Vol. 2: History and Literature of Early Christianity, Walter de Gruyter
- Komarnitsky, Kris (2014), "Cognitive Dissonance and the Resurrection of Jesus", The Fourth R Magazine, 27 (5)
- Kremer, Jakob (1977), Die Osterevangelien – Geschichten um Geschichte (in German), Stuttgart: Katholisches Bibelwerk
- Leman, Johan (2015), Van totem tot verrezen Heer. Een historisch-antropologisch verhaal, Pelckmans
- Loke, Andrew Ter Ern (2017), The Origin of Divine Christology, vol. 169, Cambridge University Press, ISBN 978-1-108-19142-5
- Lüdemann, Gerd; Özen, Alf, De opstanding van Jezus. Een historische benadering (Was mit Jesus wirklich geschah. Die Auferstehung historisch betrachtet), The Have/Averbode
- Mack, Burton L. (1988), "The Congregations of the Christ", A Myth of Innocence: Mark and Christian Origins, Fortress Press, ISBN 978-0-8006-2549-8
- Mack, Burton L. (1995), Who wrote the New Testament? The making of the Christian myth, Harper San Francisco, ISBN 978-0-06-065517-4
- Mack, Burton L. (1997) [1995], Wie schreven het Nieuwe Testament werkelijk? Feiten, mythen en motieven, Uitgeverij Ankh-Hermes
- Maier, P. L. (1975), "The Empty Tomb as History", Christianity Today
- Moss, Candida (2012). "Current Trends in the Study of Early Christian Martyrdom". Bulletin for the Study of Religion. 41 (3): 22–29. doi:10.1558/bsor.v41i3.22. Archived from the original on 25 February 2014.
- Netland, Harold (2001), Encountering Religious Pluralism: The Challenge to Christian Faith & Mission, InterVarsity Press
- Noll, Mark A., Turning Points, Baker Academic, 1997
- Pagels, Elaine (2005), De Gnostische Evangelien (The Gnostic Gospels), Servire
- Price, Robert M. (2000), Deconstructing Jesus, Prometheus Books, ISBN 9781573927581
- Pritz, Ray A., Nazarene Jewish Christianity From the End of the New Testament Period Until Its Disappearance in the Fourth Century. Magnes Press – E.J. Brill, Jerusalem – Leiden (1988).
- Richardson, Cyril Charles. Early Christian Fathers. Westminster John Knox Press (1953). ISBN 0-664-22747-3.
- Stark, Rodney.The Rise of Christianity. Harper Collins Pbk. Ed edition 1997. ISBN 0-06-067701-5
- Stendahl, Krister (1963), "The Apostle Paul and the Introspective Conscience of the West" (PDF), The Harvard Theological Review, 56 (3): 199–215, doi:10.1017/S0017816000024779, S2CID 170331485
- Tabor, James D. "Ancient Judaism: Nazarenes and Ebionites" Archived 10 June 2010 at the Wayback Machine, The Jewish Roman World of Jesus. Department of Religious Studies at the University of North Carolina at Charlotte (1998)
- Talbert, Charles H. (2011), The Development of Christology during the First Hundred Years: and Other Essays on Early Christian Christology. Supplements to Novum Testamentum 140., BRILL
- Taylor, Joan E. Christians and the Holy Places: The Myth of Jewish-Christian Origins. Oxford University Press (1993). ISBN 0-19-814785-6.
- Thiede, Carsten Peter. The Dead Sea Scrolls and the Jewish Origins of Christianity. Palgrabe Macmillan (2003). ISBN 1-4039-6143-3
- Valantasis, Richard. The Making of the Self: Ancient and Modern Asceticism. James Clarke & Co (2008) ISBN 978-0-227-17281-0.The Making of the Self: Ancient and Modern Asceticism / Richard Valantasis
- Van Daalen, D. H. (1972), The Real Resurrection, London: Collins
- Vermes, Geza (2008a), The Resurrection, London: Penguin
- Vermes, Geza (2008b), The Resurrection: History and Myth, New York: Doubleday, ISBN 978-0-7394-9969-6
- Vidmar (2005), The Catholic Church Through the Ages
- White, L. Michael. From Jesus to Christianity. HarperCollins (2004). ISBN 0-06-052655-6.
- Wilson, Barrie A. How Jesus Became Christian. New York: St. Martin's Press, (2008).
- Wright, N.T. The New Testament and the People of God. Fortress Press (1992). ISBN 0-8006-2681-8.

=== Web sources ===
History of Christianity: Ante-Nicene period
Preceded by: Apostolic; Age / Ante-Nicene period / Followed by: Christianity in late antiquity
| BC | C1 | C2 | C3 | C4 | C5 | C6 | C7 | C8 | C9 | C10 |
| C11 | C12 | C13 | C14 | C15 | C16 | C17 | C18 | C19 | C20 | C21 |
