= Diversity in early Christian theology =

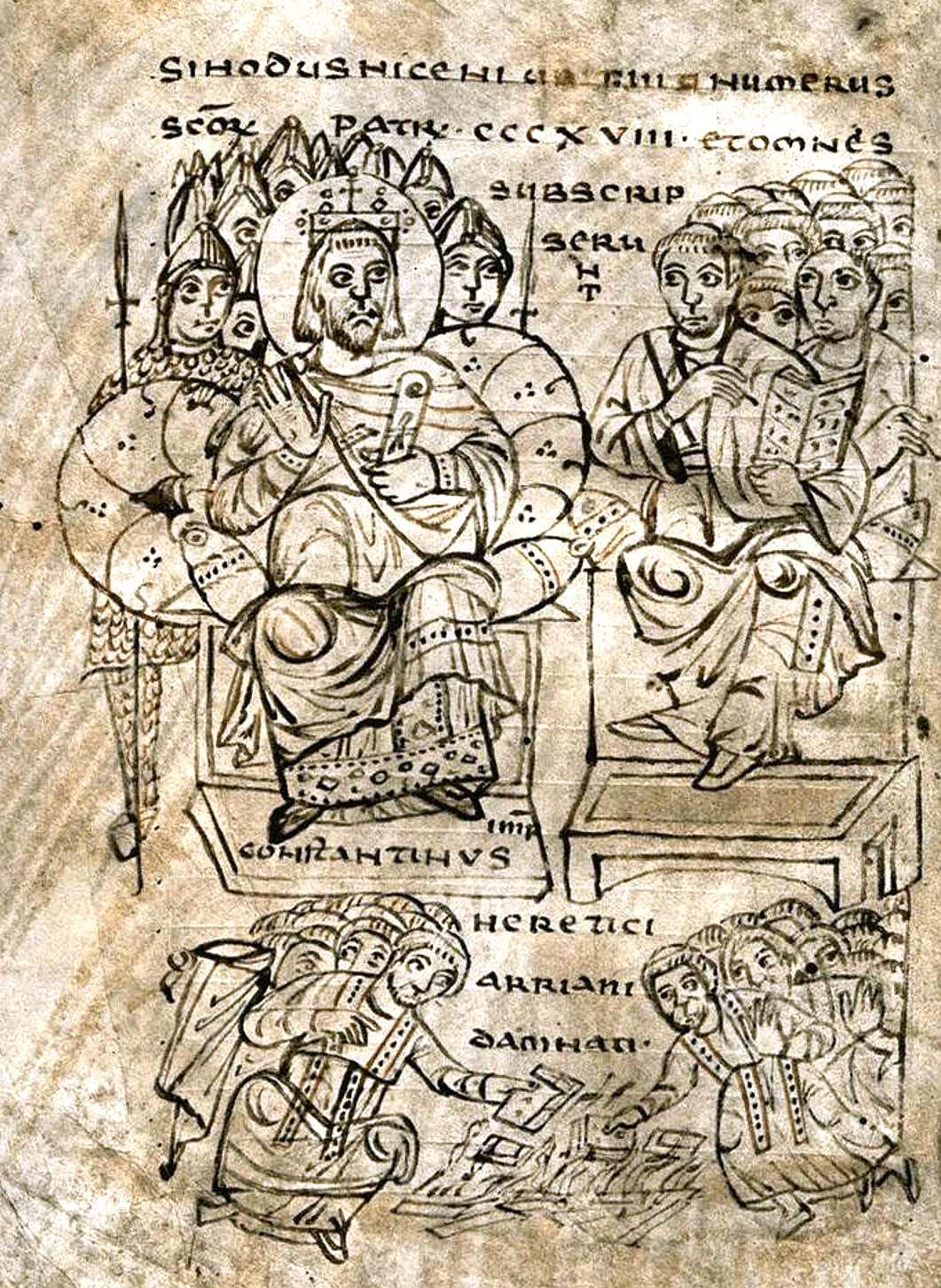
Constantine burning Arian books, illustration from a compendium of canon law, c. 825

Traditionally in Christianity, orthodoxy and heresy have been viewed in relation to the "orthodoxy" as an authentic lineage of tradition; other forms of Christianity were viewed as deviant streams of thought and therefore heterodox. This view was challenged by the publication of Walter Bauer's Rechtgläubigkeit und Ketzerei im ältesten Christentum ("Orthodoxy and Heresy in Earliest Christianity") in 1934. Bauer endeavored to rethink early Christianity historically, independent from the views of the current church. He stated that the 2nd-century church was very diverse and included many "heretical" groups that had an equal claim to apostolic tradition. Bauer interpreted the struggle between the orthodox and heterodox to be the "mainstream" Church of Rome struggling to attain dominance. He presented Edessa and Egypt as places where the "orthodoxy" of Rome had little influence during the 2nd century. As he saw it, the theological thought of the "Orient" (in this case the Eastern Roman Empire) at the time would later be labeled "heresy". The response by modern scholars has been mixed. Some scholars clearly support Bauer's conclusions and others express concerns about his "attacking [of] orthodox sources with inquisitional zeal and exploiting to a nearly absurd extent the argument from silence." However, modern scholars have critiqued and updated Bauer's model.

According to Keith Hopkins, the claimed institutional unity of the Christian Church was propaganda constantly repeated by orthodox Christian writers, rather than a genuine historical reality.

== Divisions ==
One of the discussions among scholars of early Christianity in the past century is to what extent it is appropriate to speak of "orthodoxy" and "heresy". Higher criticism drastically altered the previous perception that heresy was a very rare exception to the orthodoxy. Bauer was particularly influential in the reconsideration of the historical model. During the 1970s, increasing focus on the effect of social, political and economic circumstances on the formation of early Christianity occurred as Bauer's work found a wider audience. A movement away from presuming the correctness or dominance of the orthodoxy is seen as understandable, in light of modern approaches. However, some feel that, instead of an even and neutral approach to historical analysis, the heterodox sects are given an assumption of superiority over the orthodox (or proto-orthodox) movement. The current debate is vigorous and broad. While it is difficult to summarize all current views, general statements may be made, remembering that such broad strokes will have exceptions in specific cases.

=== Adoptionism ===
An early form of Adoptionism, the doctrine that Jesus became the son of God by adoption, held that Jesus was born human only, and that he became divine, by adoption at his baptism, being chosen because of his sinless devotion to the will of God. The first representatives of this view were the Ebionites. They understood Jesus as Messiah and Son of God in terms of the anointing at his baptism. While the 27 books that became the New Testament canon present Jesus as fully human, Adoptionists (who may have used non-canonical gospels) in addition excluded any miraculous origin for him, seeing him as simply the child of Joseph and Mary, born of them in the normal way.

Some scholars regard a non-canonical gospel used by the Ebionites, now lost except for fragments quoted in the Panarion of Epiphanius of Salamis, as the first to be written, and believe Adoptionist theology may predate the New Testament. Others, on the contrary, consider that this work "clearly presupposes the canonical Gospels." This gospel's account of the baptism of Jesus, as quoted by Epiphanius, says that the voice from heaven declared: "This day have I begotten thee", a phrase echoing Psalm 2:7, and some see this phrase as supporting the doctrine that it was at his baptism ("this day") that Jesus became God's (adopted) son. These words from Psalm 2 are also used twice in the canonical Epistle to the Hebrews, which on the contrary presents Jesus as the Son "through whom (God) made the universe."

The Adoptionist view was later developed by adherents of the form of Monarchianism that is represented by Theodotus of Byzantium and Paul of Samosata.

Adoptionism clearly conflicted with the claim, as in the Gospel of John (see Alogi for those who rejected the Gospel of John), that Jesus is the eternal Word, and it was declared a heresy by Pope Victor I at the end of the 2nd century. It was formally rejected by the First Council of Nicaea (325), which wrote the orthodox doctrine of the consubstantiality of the Father and the Son (the co-eminence of the Holy Spirit, and thus the Trinity, did not come about until the Fourth Ecumenical [Council of Chalcedon] in AD 451) and identified Jesus as eternally begotten.

=== Arianism ===
Arianism, declared by the Council of Nicaea to be heresy, denied the full divinity of Jesus Christ, and is so called after its leader Arius. It has been called the most challenging heresy in the history of the Church.

Arius, born probably in Libya between c. 260 and 280, was ordained a priest in Alexandria in 312–313. Under Bishop Alexander (313–326), probably in about 319, he came forward as a champion of subordinationist teaching about the person of Christ.

Arius appears to have held that the Son of God was not eternal but created by the Father as an instrument for creating the world and therefore not God by nature, different from other creatures in being the one direct creation of God. The controversy quickly spread, with Arius seeking support from other disciples of his teacher Lucian of Antioch, notably Eusebius of Nicomedia, while a local synod under Alexander excommunicated Arius. Because of the agitation aroused by the dispute, Emperor Constantine I sent Hosius of Córdoba to Alexandria to attempt a settlement; but the mission failed. Accordingly, in 325, Constantine convened the First Council of Nicaea, which, largely through the influence of Athanasius of Alexandria, then a deacon but destined to be Alexander's successor, defined the co-eternity and coequality of the Father and the Son, using the now famous term homoousios to express the oneness of their being, while Arius and some bishops who supported him, including Eusebius, were banished.

This council marks the end of the Early Christian period and the beginning of the period of the First seven Ecumenical Councils.

=== Docetism ===
Docetism (from the Greek δοκέω dokeō, "to seem") is the belief that Jesus' physical body was an illusion, as was his crucifixion; that is, Jesus only seemed to have a physical body and to physically die, but in reality he was incorporeal, a pure spirit, and hence could not physically die. This belief treats the sentence "the Word was made Flesh" (John 1:14) as merely figurative. Docetic theology was a prominent feature of dualistic gnostics.

=== Ebionites ===
The Ebionites ("poor ones") were a sect of Jewish Christians who flourished in the early centuries of Christianity, especially east of the Jordan. They emphasized the binding character of the Mosaic Law and believed Jesus was the human son of Mary and Joseph. They seem to have been ascetics, and are said to have rejected Paul's epistles and to have used only one Gospel.

=== Gnosticism ===
Several distinct religious sects, some of them Christian, adhered to an array of beliefs that would later be termed Gnostic. One such sect, that of the Simonians, was said to have been founded by Simon Magus, the Samaritan who is mentioned in the 1st-century Acts 8:9–24 and who figures prominently in several apocryphal and heresiological accounts by Early Christian writers, who regarded him as the source of all heresies.

The most successful Christian Gnostic was the priest Valentinus (c. 100 – c. 160), who founded a Gnostic church in Rome and developed an elaborate cosmology. Gnostics considered the material world to be a prison created by a fallen or evil spirit, the god of the material world (called the demiurge). Gnostics identified the God of the Hebrew Bible as this demiurge. Secret knowledge (gnosis) was said to liberate one's soul to return to the true God in the realm of light. Valentinus and other Christian gnostics identified Jesus as the Savior, a spirit sent from the true God into the material world to liberate the souls trapped there.

While there appear to be Gnostic elements in some early Christian writing, Irenaeus and others condemned Gnosticism as a heresy, rejecting its dualistic cosmology and vilification of the material world and the creator of that world. Gnostics thought the God of the Old Testament was not the true God. It was considered to be the demiurge and either fallen, as taught by Valentinus (c. 100 – c. 160), or evil, as taught by the Sethians and Ophites.

The Gospel of John, according to Stephen L Harris, both includes Gnostic elements and refutes Gnostic beliefs, presenting a dualistic universe of light and dark, spirit and matter, good and evil, much like the Gnostic accounts, but instead of escaping the material world, Jesus bridges the spiritual and physical worlds. Raymond E. Brown wrote that even though gnostics interpreted John to support their doctrines, the author didn't intend that. The Johannine epistles were written (whether by the author of the Gospel or someone in his circle) to argue against gnostic doctrines.

The Gospel of Thomas, it is often claimed, has some Gnostic elements but lacks the full Gnostic cosmology. However, even the description of these elements as "gnostic" is based mainly upon the presupposition that the text as a whole is a "gnostic" gospel, and this idea itself is based upon little other than the fact that it was found along with gnostic texts at Nag Hammadi. The scene in John in which "doubting Thomas" ascertains that the resurrected Jesus is physical refutes the Gnostic idea that Jesus returned to spirit form after death. The written gospel draws on an earlier oral tradition associated with Thomas. Some scholars argue that the Gospel of John was meant to oppose the beliefs of that community.

Some believe that Gnostic Christianity was a later development, some time around the middle or late 2nd century, around the time of Valentinus. Gnosticism was in turn made up of many smaller groups, some of which did not claim any connection to Jesus Christ. In Mandaeist Gnosticism, Mandaeans maintain that Jesus was a mšiha kdaba or "false messiah" who perverted the teachings entrusted to him by John the Baptist. The word k(a)daba, however, derives from two roots in Mandaic: the first root, meaning "to lie", is the one traditionally ascribed to Jesus; the second, meaning "to write", might provide a second meaning, that of "book"; hence some Mandaeans, motivated perhaps by an ecumenical spirit, maintain that Jesus was not a "lying Messiah" but a "Book Messiah", the "book" in question presumably being the Christian Gospels. This however seems to be a folk etymology without support in the Mandaean texts. A modern view has argued that Marcionism is mistakenly reckoned among the Gnostics, and really represents a fourth interpretation of the significance of Jesus. Gnostics freely exchanged concepts and texts. It is considered likely that Valentinius was influenced by previous concepts such as Sophia, or by Simon Magus, as much as he influenced others.

=== Marcionism ===
In 144, the Church in Rome expelled Marcion of Sinope. He thereupon set up his own separate ecclesiastical organization, later called Marcionism. Like the Gnostics, he promoted dualism. Unlike the Gnostics, however, he founded his beliefs not on secret knowledge (gnosis) but on the vast difference between what he saw as the "evil" deity of the Old Testament and the God of love of the New Testament, on which he expounded in his Antithesis. Consequently, Marcionists were vehemently anti-Judaist in their beliefs. They rejected the Jewish-Christian Gospel according to the Hebrews (see also Jewish–Christian gospels) and all the other Gospels with the single exception of the Gospel of Marcion, which appears to be a redacted version of the Gospel of Luke.

From the perspectives of Tertullian and Epiphanius it appeared that Marcion rejected the non-Lukan gospels; however, in Marcion's time, it may be that the only gospel he was familiar with from Pontus was the gospel of Luke. Although it has been suggested by some that Marcion's gospel pre-dated canonical Luke, the dominant scholarly view is that the Marcionite Gospel was a redaction of canonical Luke in order to conform to Marcion's anti-Jewish stance.

Marcion argued that Christianity should be solely based on Christian Love. He went so far as to say that Jesus' mission was to overthrow Demiurge—the fickle, cruel, despotic God of the Old Testament—and replace Him with the Supreme God of Love whom Jesus came to reveal. Marcion was labeled a gnostic by Irenaeus. Irenaeus labeled Marcion this because of Marcion expressing this core gnostic belief, that the creator God of the Jews and the Old Testament was the demiurge. This position, he said, was supported by the ten Epistles of Paul that Marcion also accepted. His writing had a profound effect upon the development of Christianity and the canon.

=== Montanism ===
About 156, Montanus launched a ministry of prophecy, criticizing Christians as increasingly worldly and bishops as increasingly autocratic. Traveling in his native Anatolia, he and two women preached a return to primitive Christian simplicity, prophecy, celibacy, and asceticism. Tertullian, "having grown puritanical with age", embraced Montanism as a more outright application of Christ's teaching. Montanus's followers revered him as the Paraclete that Christ had promised, and he led his sect out into a field to meet the New Jerusalem. His sect spread across the Roman Empire, survived persecution, and relished martyrdom. The Church banned them as a heresy, and in the 6th century Justinian ordered the sect's extinction.

The sect's ecstasy, speaking in tongues, and other details are similar to those found in modern Pentecostalism.

=== Trinitarianism ===
According to Bart Ehrman, trinitarianism was not taught by the historical Jesus and his apostles. In his view, trinitarianism was a response to various creeds which have been labeled as heresies; it was a result of theological disputes that took centuries. On the other hand, according to the "New Religionsgeschichtliche Schule", c.q. "Early High Christology Club", which includes Martin Hengel, Larry Hurtado, N. T. Wright, and Richard Bauckham, the "incarnation Christology" or "high Christology" did not evolve over a longer time, but was a "big bang" of ideas which were already present at the start of Christianity, and took further shape in the first few decades of the church, as witnessed in the writings of Paul. Some 'Early High Christology' proponents scholars argue that this "high Christology" may go back to Jesus himself.

== See also ==
- Christian heresy
- Christian theology
- Christian views on the Old Covenant § Torah observance
- Christianity in the 1st century
- Christianity in the 2nd century
- Christianity in the 3rd century
- Constantine I and Christianity
- Constantinian shift
- Early centers of Christianity
- History of Christianity
- List of Christian heresies
- Split of early Christianity and Judaism

== Bibliography ==
- Walter Bauer, Orthodoxy and Heresy in Earliest Christianity, Philadelphia: Fortress, 1971, (original German edition: 1934).
- Berard, Wayne Daniel. When Christians Were Jews (That Is, Now). Cowley Publications (2006). ISBN 1-56101-280-7.
- Boatwright, Mary Taliaferro & Gargola, Daniel J & Talbert, Richard John Alexander. The Romans: From Village to Empire. Oxford University Press (2004). ISBN 0-19-511875-8.
- Dauphin, C. "De l'Église de la circoncision à l'Église de la gentilité – sur une nouvelle voie hors de l'impasse". Studium Biblicum Franciscanum. Liber Annuus XLIII (1993).
- James D. G. Dunn, Unity and Diversity in the New Testament: An Inquiry into the Character of Earliest Christianity, Londra, SCM Press, 1990.
- Dunn, James D.G. Jews and Christians: The Parting of the Ways, A.D. 70 to 135. Pp 33–34. Wm. B. Eerdmans Publishing (1999). ISBN 0-8028-4498-7.
- Edwards, Mark (2009). Catholicity and Heresy in the Early Church. Ashgate. ISBN 9780754662914.
- Ehrman, Bart D. (2003). Lost Christianities: The Battles for Scripture and the Faiths We Never Knew. Oxford University Press. ISBN 978-0-19-972712-4.
- Ehrman, Bart D. Misquoting Jesus: The Story Behind Who Changed the Bible and Why. HarperCollins (2005). ISBN 0-06-073817-0.
- Ehrman, Bart D. (2009). Jesus, Interrupted: Revealing the Hidden Contradictions in the Bible (And Why We Don't Know About Them). HarperOne. ISBN 978-0-06-186328-8.
- Esler, Philip F. The Early Christian World. Routledge (2004). ISBN 0-415-33312-1.
- Harris, Stephen L. Understanding the Bible. Mayfield (1985). ISBN 0-87484-696-X.
- Hartog, Paul A., ed., Orthodoxy and Heresy in Early Christian Contexts: Reconsidering the Bauer Thesis, Eugene, OR: Wipf & Stock (2015). ISBN 9781610975049
- Hopkins, Keith (2 November 2017). "12 - Christian Number and its implications". In Kelly, Christopher (ed.). Sociological Studies in Roman History. Cambridge University Press. p. 442. doi:10.1017/cbo9781139093552.014. ISBN 9781139093552.
- Hunt, Emily Jane. Christianity in the Second Century: The Case of Tatian. Routledge (2003). ISBN 0-415-30405-9.
- Keck, Leander E. Paul and His Letters. Fortress Press (1988). ISBN 0-8006-2340-1.
- Loke, Andrew Ter Ern (2017). The Origin of Divine Christology. Vol. 169. Cambridge University Press. ISBN 978-1-108-19142-5.
- Pelikan, Jaroslav Jan. The Christian Tradition: The Emergence of the Catholic Tradition (100–600). University of Chicago Press (1975). ISBN 0-226-65371-4.
- Pritz, Ray A., Nazarene Jewish Christianity From the End of the New Testament Period Until Its Disappearance in the Fourth Century. Magnes Press – E.J. Brill, Jerusalem – Leiden (1988).
- Richardson, Cyril Charles. Early Christian Fathers. Westminster John Knox Press (1953). ISBN 0-664-22747-3.
- Stark, Rodney.The Rise of Christianity. Harper Collins Pbk. Ed edition 1997. ISBN 0-06-067701-5
- Stambaugh, John E. & Balch, David L. The New Testament in Its Social Environment. John Knox Press (1986). ISBN 0-664-25012-2.
- Tabor, James D. "Ancient Judaism: Nazarenes and Ebionites", The Jewish Roman World of Jesus. Department of Religious Studies at the University of North Carolina at Charlotte (1998).
- Taylor, Joan E. Christians and the Holy Places: The Myth of Jewish-Christian Origins. Oxford University Press (1993). ISBN 0-19-814785-6.
- Thiede, Carsten Peter. The Dead Sea Scrolls and the Jewish Origins of Christianity. Palgrabe Macmillan (2003). ISBN 1-4039-6143-3.
- Turner, H. E. W., The Pattern of Christian Truth: A Study in the Relations Between Orthodoxy and Heresy in the Early Church, London, Mowbray (1954). Reprint: Eugene, OR, Wipf & Stock (2004). ISBN 9781592449828
- Valantasis, Richard. The Making of the Self: Ancient and Modern Asceticism. James Clarke & Co (2008) ISBN 978-0-227-17281-0.
- White, L. Michael. From Jesus to Christianity. HarperCollins (2004). ISBN 0-06-052655-6.
- Wright, N.T. The New Testament and the People of God. Fortress Press (1992). ISBN 0-8006-2681-8.
- Wylen, Stephen M. The Jews in the Time of Jesus: An Introduction. Paulist Press (1995). ISBN 0-8091-3610-4.
