= Historical background of the New Testament =

Most scholars who study the historical Jesus and early Christianity believe that the canonical gospels and the life of Jesus must be viewed within their historical and cultural context, rather than purely in terms of Christian orthodoxy. They look at Second Temple Judaism, the tensions, trends, and changes in the region under the influence of Hellenism and the Roman occupation, and the Jewish factions of the time, seeing Jesus as a Jew in this environment; and the written New Testament as arising from a period of oral gospel traditions after his death.

In 64 BCE, the already partially Hellenized Hasmonean Kingdom of Judea was incorporated into the Roman Republic as a client kingdom when Pompey the Great conquered Jerusalem. The Romans treated Judea as a valued crossroads to trading territories, and as a buffer state against the Parthian Empire. Direct rule was imposed in 6 CE, with the formation of the province of Judea. Roman prefects were appointed to maintain order through a political appointee, the High Priest. After the uprising by Judas the Galilean and before Pontius Pilate (26 CE), in general, Roman Judea was troubled but self-managed. Occasional riots, sporadic rebellions, and violent resistance were an ongoing risk.

Throughout the third quarter of the first century, the conflict between the Jews and the Romans gave rise to increasing tensions. Before the end of the third quarter of the first century, these tensions culminated with the first Jewish-Roman War and the destruction of the Second Temple in Jerusalem. This war effectively flattened Jerusalem, and the city was later rebuilt as the Roman colony of Aelia Capitolina, in which Jews were forbidden to live.

== Factions, groups and cults in the Roman period ==
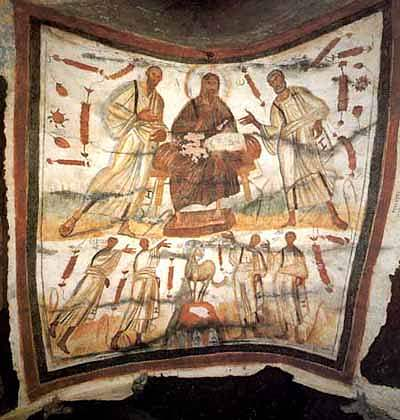
Christ Between Peter and Paul, 4th century, Catacomb of Saints Marcellinus and Peter on the Via Labicana

According to the Jewish-Roman historian Flavius Josephus, the three parties in contemporary Judaism were the Pharisees, the Sadducees and the Essenes, the last of these three being apparently marginalized and in some cases retired to quasi-monastic communities. Josephus also speaks of a "Fourth Movement", Zealots, Lestai or Sicarii.

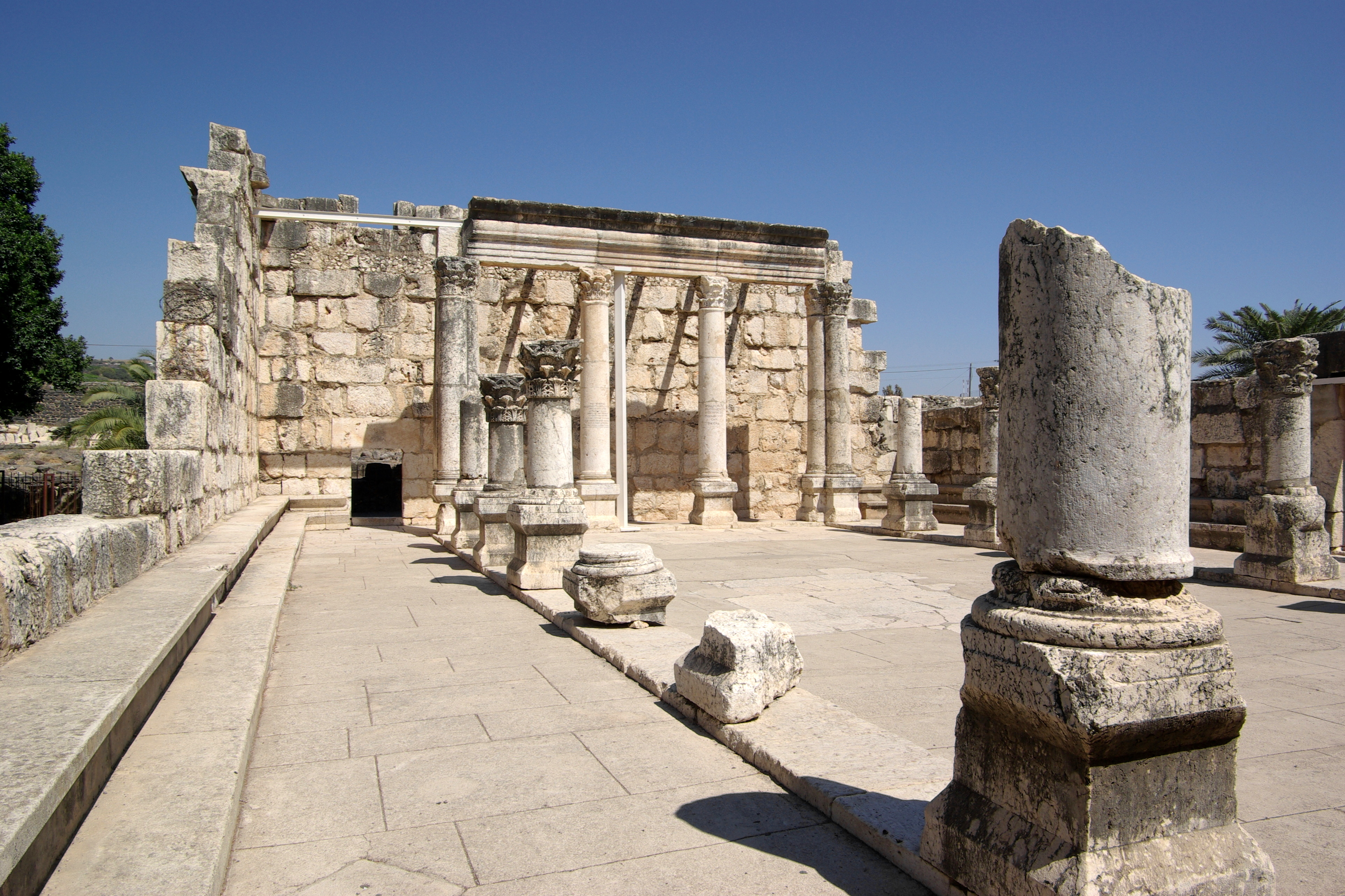
The ancient synagogue at Capernaum

The Pharisees were a powerful force in 1st-century Judea. Early Christians shared several beliefs of the Pharisees, such as resurrection, retribution in the next world, angels, human freedom, and divine providence. After the fall of the Second Temple, the Pharisaic outlook was established in Rabbinic Judaism. Some scholars speculate that Jesus was himself a Pharisee. In Jesus' day, the two main schools of thought among the Pharisees were the House of Hillel, which had been founded by the Tanna, Hillel the Elder, and the House of Shammai. Historians do not know whether there were Pharisees in Galilee during Jesus' life, or what they would have been like.

The Sadducees were particularly powerful in Jerusalem. They accepted the written Law only, rejecting the traditional interpretations accepted by the Pharisees, such as belief in retribution in an afterlife, resurrection of the body, angels, and spirits. After the fall of Jerusalem, they disappeared from history.

The Essenes were apocalyptic ascetics, one of the three (or four) major Jewish schools of the time, although they were not mentioned in the New Testament. Some scholars theorize that Jesus was an Essene, or close to them. Among these scholars is Pope Benedict XVI, who supposes in his book on Jesus that "it appears that not only John the Baptist, but possibly Jesus and his family as well, were close to the Qumran community."

The Zealots were a revolutionary party opposed to Roman rule, one of those parties that, according to Josephus inspired the fanatical stand in Jerusalem that led to its destruction in the year 70 CE. Luke identifies Simon, a disciple, as a "zealot", which might mean a member of the Zealot party or a zealous person. The notion that Jesus himself was a Zealot does not do justice to the earliest Synoptic material describing him. Alternatively, according to Dale Martin of Yale and supported by Bart Ehrman, as well as an essay by James Still, Jesus has been cast in a Zealot/violent apocalyptic light.

=== Sadducees and Pharisees in the Roman period ===
During this period serious theological differences emerged between the Sadducees and Pharisees. Whereas Sadducees favored a limited interpretation of the Torah, Pharisees debated new applications of the law and devised ways for all Jews to incorporate purity practices (hitherto limited to the Jerusalem Temple, see also Ministry of Jesus#Ritual cleanliness) in their everyday lives. Unlike the Sadducees, the Pharisees also believed in (and introduced) the concept of the Resurrection of the Dead in a future, Messianic Age or World to Come.

=== New prophets ===
During this time a number of individuals claimed to be prophets, in the tradition of Elijah and Elisha. The Talmud provides two examples of such Jewish miracle workers around the time of Jesus. Mishnah Ta'anit 3:8 tells of "Honi the Circledrawer" who, in the middle of the 1st century BCE, was famous for his ability to successfully pray for rain. On one occasion when God did not answer his prayer, he drew a circle in the dust, stood inside it, and informed God that he would not move until it rained. When it began to drizzle, Honi told God that he was not satisfied and expected more rain; it then began to pour. He explained that he wanted a calm rain, at which point the rain calmed to a normal rain.

Mishnah Berakot 5:5 tells of Hanina ben Dosa, who in the generation following Jesus cured Gamaliel's son by prayer (compare with Matthew 8: 5–13). A later story (In the Babylonian Talmud, Berakot 33a) tells of a lizard that used to injure passers-by. Hanina ben Dosa came and put his heel over the hole; the lizard bit him and died.

Such men were respected for their relationship with God but not considered especially saintly; their abilities were seen as one more unknowable thing and not deemed a result of any ultra-strict observance of Jewish law. These men were sometimes doubted, often respected, and even (according to Géza Vermes) addressed by their followers as "lord" — but never considered "saviors" or "messiahs."

=== Messiahs and millennial prophets ===
The literal translation of the Hebrew word mashiach (messiah) is "anointed", which refers to a ritual of consecrating someone or something by putting holy anointing oil upon it. It is used throughout the Hebrew Bible in reference to a wide variety of individuals and objects; for example, a Jewish king, Jewish priests and prophets, the Jewish Temple and its utensils, unleavened bread, and a non-Jewish king (Cyrus the Great).

In Jewish eschatology the term came to refer to a future king from the Davidic line who will be "anointed" to be king of God's kingdom and rule the Jewish people during the Messianic Age. He is considered to be a great military and political leader descended from King David, well versed with the laws that are followed in Judaism.

After the fall of the Hasmoneans and the subsequent Roman occupation, it is plausible that Jews believed it to be the end of days and hoped that the Romans would somehow fall or be replaced by a Jewish king. Most Jews believed that their history was governed by God, meaning that even the conquest of Judea by the Romans was a divine act. They believed that the Romans would be replaced by a Jewish king only through divine intervention.

In 36 CE a Samaritan led a large group up Mount Gerizim, where they believed Moses had buried sacred vessels. Pilate blocked their route and killed their leaders. Josephus, who elsewhere expressed the common Judean prejudice against Samaritans, suggested that they were armed. But the surviving Samaritans appealed to the Syrian Legate, Vitellius, that they were unarmed and that Pilate's actions were excessively cruel. According to historian H.H. Ben-Sasson, Samaria, as part of Roman Judea, was in a sense a "satellite of Syria". As a result, Pilate was sent to Rome and ultimately dismissed from his post as prefect. Another such prophet was Theudas, who, sometime between 44 and 46 led a large group of people to the Jordan river, which he claimed he could part. Cuspius Fadus, a procurator after Pilate, blocked their route and killed Theudas.

An "Egyptian" prophet" led thirty thousand around the Mount of Olives and sought to enter Jerusalem until stopped by Antonius Felix, a procurator after Fadus.

=== Zealots, Sicarii and bandits ===
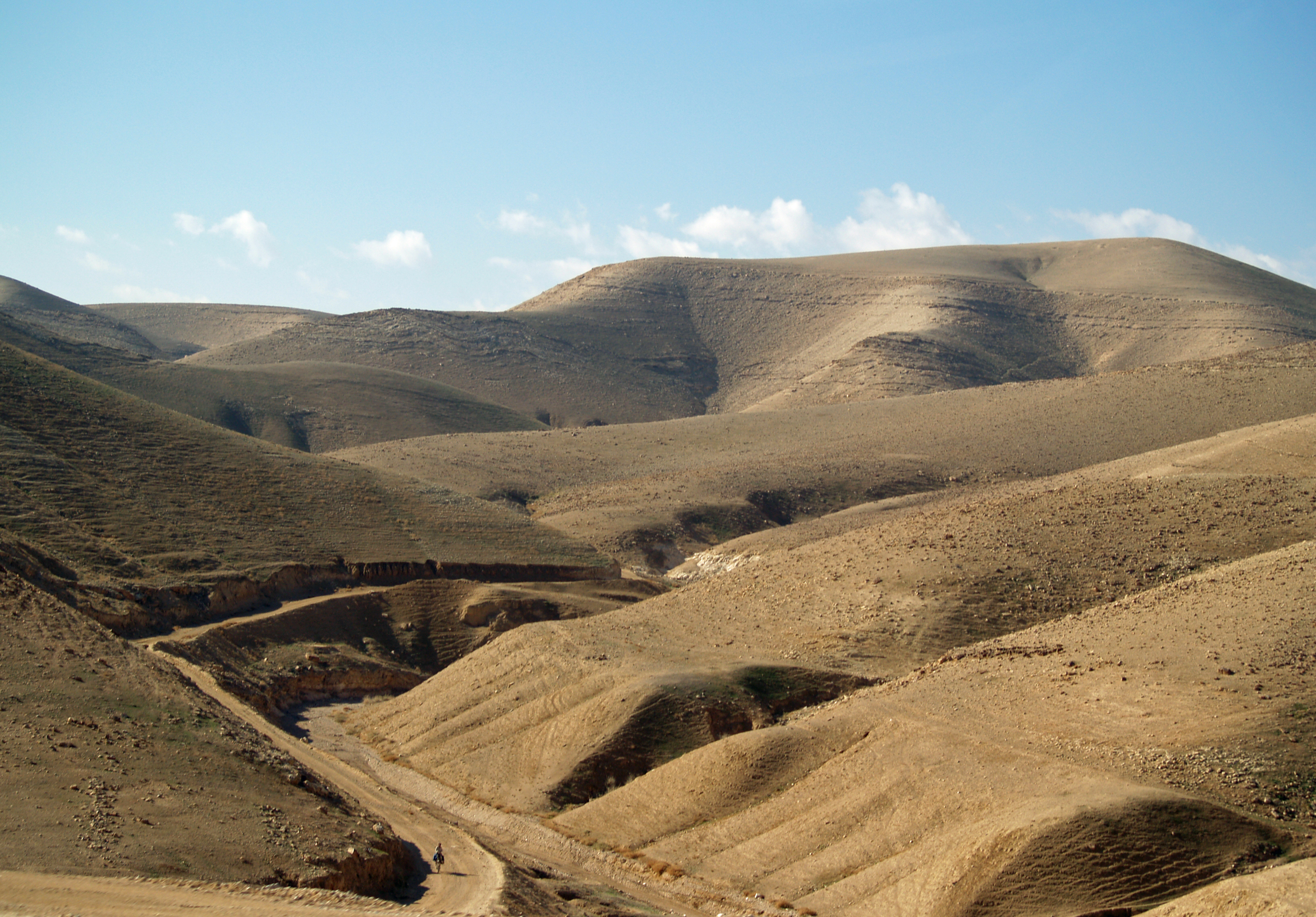
Judean hills of Israel

When Herod was still military governor in the Galilee, he spent a good deal of time fighting bandits under the leadership of Ezekias. These bandits are best understood as a peasant group whose targets were local elites (both Hasmonean and Herodian) rather than Rome. Ventidius Cumanus (procurator 48 to 52 CE) often retaliated against brigandry by punishing peasant communities he believed to be their base of support. When a Galillean pilgrim on the way to Jerusalem was murdered by a Samaritan, the bandit chief Eliezar organized Galilleans for a counter-attack, and Cumanus moved against the Jews. A Syrian legate, Quadratus, intervened and sent several Jewish and Samaritan officials to Rome. The Emperor Claudius took the Jewish side, and had the Samaritan leaders executed and exiled, and turned one named Veler over to the Jews who beheaded him. Thus, widespread peasant unrest of this period was not exclusively directed against Rome but also expressed discontent against urban elites and other groups; Roman policy sought to contain the power of the bandits while cultivating Jewish support.

During the First Jewish-Roman War in 66, Josephus was sent to command the Galilee. He raised an army primarily of local bandits who pillaged nearby Greek and Roman cities (including ones occupied by Jewish elites), including the administrative centers of Sepphoris, Tiberias, and Gabara (sometimes Gadara). This suggests that they were concerned primarily with gain or social insurrection against local elites, rather than a political revolution against Roman occupation. When Roman legions arrived from Syria, the bandit army melted away.

The Romans employed a scorched earth policy in its fight in the north, driving thousands of peasants southwards towards Jerusalem. Between 67 and 68, these peasants, perhaps led by bandits, formed a new political party called the Zealots, which believed that an independent kingdom should be restored immediately through force of arms. It is unclear whether their leaders made messianic claims; Josephus, the main source of available information on the war, does not explicitly state whether any Zealot figures called themselves or others "messiah." The Zealots imprisoned members of the Herodian family, killed the former high priests Ananus ben Ananus and Joshua ben Gamla. It is possible that they believed they were purging elements whom they believed would have surrendered to the Romans. But these purges also reveal the great social divide between Jewish peasants and aristocrats at this time. They formed part of a social revolution: although they ultimately lost to the Romans, elite groups like the Hasmoneans, Herodians, and Sadducees would never again have power in Roman Judea.

== Analysis of the gospels ==
Most historians view the gospels not as an objective account of Jesus, but as the product of men writing at a particular period, and grappling with particular theological as well as political issues. Specifically, they assume that, after Jesus's death, his sayings and stories about him circulated among his followers until, at some point in the mid-1st century, someone (or a group of people) wrote his sayings down in Greek (see Q source) and someone edited and organized stories about his life into a historical narrative: the Gospel of Mark. As these two documents circulated among Christians, other historical narratives were edited and organized. The four gospels ascribed to Matthew, Mark, Luke and John were regionally authoritative by proto-orthodoxy by the 2nd century. Some historians have suggested that, between Nero's persecution of Christians in 64 CE and the Jewish revolt in 66 CE, Gentile Christians saw more sense in giving Jews, rather than Romans, responsibility for Jesus' death.

Moreover, just as Rabbinic Judaism was in part the Pharisaic response to their acknowledgment that the Temple would not be rebuilt in their lifetimes, Christianity reflected the acknowledgment of early Christians that the Second Coming of Christ and the establishment of God's kingdom on earth was not to happen in their lifetimes. The critical analysis of the Gospels involves, at least in part, a consideration of how these concerns affected the Gospels' accounts of Jesus.

According to historian Paula Fredriksen (1988: 5), critical scholars rely on four basic criteria for extrapolating an "authentic" historical account of Jesus out of the New Testament sources:

1. Dissimilarity: "if the earliest form of a saying or story differs in emphasis from a characteristic teaching or concern both of contemporary Judaism and of the early church, then it may be authentic."
2. Coherence: "if material from the earlier strata of tradition is consonant with other material already established as probably authentic, then it too is probably authentic."
3. Multiple attestation: "if material appears in a number of different sources and literary contexts, then it may be authentic."
4. Linguistic suitability: "material with a claim to authenticity should be susceptible of Aramaic rendering, since Jesus did not teach in Greek, the language of the documents."

As Fredriksen observes, these criteria do not guarantee an accurate historical reconstruction. Nevertheless, she argues,

If something stands in the gospels that is clearly not in the interests of the late 1st-century church — disparaging remarks about Gentiles, for example, or explicit pronouncements about the imminent end of the world — then it has a stronger claim to authenticity than otherwise. Stated briefly, anything embarrassing is probably earlier. (1988: 6).

Even these criteria are not sufficient to recover "what really happened." They can, however, enable historians to suggest "with reasonable security what possibly happened, what probably happened, and what could not possibly have happened.

According to Fredriksen, two events in the Gospels probably happened: John's baptism and Pilate's crucifixion of Jesus. These events are mentioned in all four gospels. Moreover, they do not conform to Jewish tradition in which there are no baptized and crucified messiahs. They are also embarrassing to the early Church. John the Baptist was a figure of major historical significance, as demonstrated by the independent accounts of both Josephus and the Gospels. Fredriksen notes that the Gospel writers sought to subordinate John to Jesus in ways that reflect later Christian concerns. For example, Matthew has John resist baptizing Jesus; Luke refers to the baptism in passing; and the Gospel of John repeatedly asserts that John is inferior to Jesus. These apologetic efforts lead Fredriksen to conclude that the historical reality was probably the reverse: John the Baptist had been more popular than Jesus in their lifetimes. She further argues that Jesus' own public mission began only after he encountered John, accepted his apocalyptic message, and received baptism from him, suggesting that Jesus' ministry arose out of John's movement before later Christian tradition projected Jesus' post-resurrection importance back into his lifetime.

Given the historical context in which the Gospels took their final form and during which Christianity first emerged, historians have struggled to understand Jesus' ministry in terms of what is known about 1st-century Judaism. According to some scholars, Jesus seems not to have belonged to any particular party or movement, but was rather eclectic (and perhaps unique) in combining elements of many of these different—and for most Jews, opposing—positions. Most critical scholars see Jesus as healing people and performing miracles in the prophetic tradition of the Galilee, and preaching God's desire for justice and righteousness in the prophetic tradition of Judea. (According to Geza Vermes, that Jesus' followers addressed him as "lord" indicates that they likened him to notable miracle workers and scribes. See Names and titles of Jesus)

As the Gospel accounts are generally held to have been composed in the period immediately following the revolt of 66–73, it has been suggested that Christians had to refashion their theological and apocalyptic claims given that Jesus did not immediately return to restore the Jewish kingdom. Moreover, as Christianity emerged as a new religion seeking converts among the Gentiles, and eventually as the religion of the emperor himself, it needed to assure both Roman authorities and prospective Gentile audiences that it neither threatened nor challenged imperial sovereignty. Some historians have argued that these two conditions played a crucial role in the revision of accounts of Jesus' life and teachings into the form they ultimately took in the Gospels.

== The divergence of early Christians and Rabbinic Jews ==
As with many religions, no precise date of founding is agreed by all parties. Christians traditionally believe that Christianity began with Jesus' ministry, and the appointment of the Twelve Apostles or the Seventy Disciples, see also Great Commission. Most historians agree that Jesus or his followers established a new Jewish sect, one that attracted both Jewish and Gentile converts. Historians continue to debate the precise moment when Christianity established itself as a new religion, apart and distinct from Judaism. Some Christians were still part of the Jewish community up until the time of the Bar Kochba revolt in the 130s, see also Jewish Christians. As late as the 4th century, John Chrysostom strongly discouraged Christians from attending Jewish festivals in Antioch, which suggests at least some ongoing contact between the two groups in that city. Similarly for the Council of Laodicea c. 365. See also Shabbat, Sabbath in Christianity, Quartodeciman, Constantine I and Christianity. According to historian Shaye J. D. Cohen,

The separation of Christianity from Judaism was a process, not an event. The essential part of this process was that the church was becoming more and more gentile, and less and less Jewish, but the separation manifested itself in different ways in each local community where Jews and Christians dwelt together. In some places, the Jews expelled the Christians; in other, the Christians left of their own accord.

—

According to Cohen, this process ended in 70 CE, after the great revolt, when various Jewish sects disappeared and Pharisaic Judaism evolved into Rabbinic Judaism, and Christianity emerged as a distinct religion. Many historians argue that the Gospels took their final form after the Great Revolt and the destruction of the Temple, although some scholars put the authorship of Mark in the 60s, and need to be understood in this context. They view Christians as much as Pharisees as being competing movements within Judaism that decisively broke only after the Bar Kokhba's revolt, when the successors of the Pharisees claimed hegemony over all Judaism, and – at least from the Jewish perspective – Christianity emerged as a new religion.

=== The First Jewish–Roman War and the destruction of the Temple ===
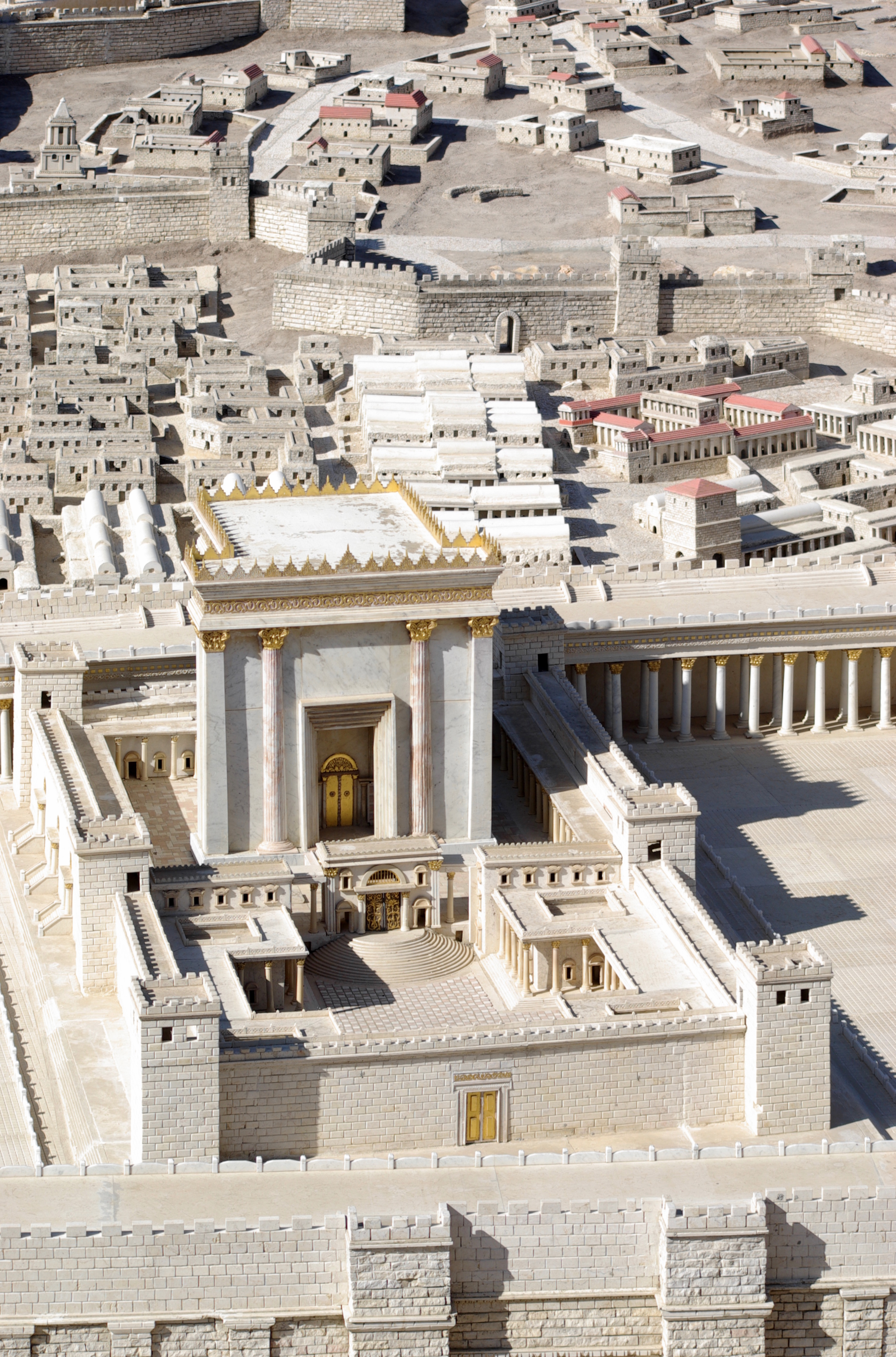
Model of Jerusalem Temple.

By 66 CE, Jewish discontent with Rome had escalated. At first, the priests tried to suppress rebellion, even calling upon the Pharisees for help. After the Roman garrison failed to stop Hellenists from desecrating a synagogue in Caesarea, however, the high priest suspended payment of tribute, inaugurating the First Jewish–Roman War. In 70, the Temple was destroyed. The destruction of the Second Temple was a profoundly traumatic experience for the Jews, who were now confronted with difficult and far-reaching questions:

- How to achieve atonement without the Temple?
- How to explain the disastrous outcome of the rebellion?
- How to live in the post-Temple, Romanized world?
- How to connect present and past traditions?

How people answered these questions depended largely on their position prior to the revolt. But the destruction of the Second Temple by the Romans not only put an end to the revolt, it marked the end of an era. Revolutionaries like the Zealots had been crushed by the Romans, and had little credibility (the last Zealots died at Masada in 73). The Sadducees, whose teachings were so closely connected to the Temple cult, disappeared. The Essenes also vanished, perhaps because their teachings so diverged from the issues of the times that the destruction of the Second Temple was of no consequence to them; precisely for this reason, they were of little consequence to the vast majority of Jews).

Two organized groups remained: the Early Christians, and Pharisees. Some scholars, such as Daniel Boyarin and Paula Fredricksen, suggest that it was at this time, when Christians and Pharisees were competing for leadership of the Jewish people, that accounts of debates between Jesus and the apostles, debates with Pharisees, and anti-Pharisaic passages, were written and incorporated into the New Testament.

=== Loss of records ===
The siege of Jerusalem in 70 CE included a major fire at the Temple which destroyed the entire compound except the Western Wall; anything of value that remained (including the altar tablet) was taken by Titus to Rome as trophies. The destruction of Jerusalem, and the loss of significant portions of Jewish cultural records were significant, with Flavius Josephus writing (about 5 years later c. 75 AD) in The Jewish War (Book VII 1.1) that Jerusalem had been flattened to the point that "there was left nothing to make those that came thither believe it had ever been inhabited." And once what was left of the ruins of Jerusalem had been turned into the Roman settlement of Aelia Capitolina, no Jews were allowed to set foot in it; and almost no direct records survive about the history of Judaism from the last part of the first century through the second century.

Margaret M. Mitchell writes that although Eusebius reports (Ecclesiastical History III 5.3) that the early Christians left Jerusalem for Pella just before Jerusalem was subjected to the final lockdown in 70, in the face of this total destruction we must accept that no first-hand Christian writings from the early Jerusalem Church have reached us.

=== The emergence of Rabbinic Judaism ===
Following the destruction of the Temple, Rome governed Judea both through a Procurator at Caesarea, which had always been the Roman provincial capital, and through a Jewish Patriarch. A former leading Pharisee, Yohanan ben Zakkai, was appointed the first Patriarch (the Hebrew word, Nasi, also means prince, or president), and he reestablished the Sanhedrin at Javneh under Pharisee control. Instead of giving tithes to the priests and sacrificing offerings at the Temple, the rabbis instructed Jews to give money to charities and study in local synagogues, as well as to pay the Fiscus Iudaicus.

In 132, the Emperor Hadrian threatened to rebuild Jerusalem as a pagan city dedicated to Jupiter, called Aelia Capitolina. Some of the leading sages of the Sanhedrin supported a rebellion (and, for a short time, an independent state) led by Simon bar Kochba; some, such as Rabbi Akiva, believed Bar Kochba to be messiah, or king. Up until this time, a number of Christians were still part of the Jewish community. However, they did not support or take part in the revolt. Whether because they had no wish to fight, or because they could not support a second messiah in addition to Jesus, or because of their harsh treatment by Bar Kochba during his brief reign, these Christians also left the Jewish community around this time. Traditionally, it is believed the Jerusalem Christians waited out the Jewish–Roman wars in Pella in the Decapolis.

This revolt ended in 135 when Bar Kochba and his army were defeated. According to a midrash, in addition to Bar Kochba the Romans tortured and executed ten leading members of the Sanhedrin (the "Ten Martyrs"). This account also claims this was belated repayment for the guilt of the ten brothers who kidnapped Joseph. It is possible that this account represents a Pharisaic response to the Christian account of Jesus' crucifixion; in both accounts the Romans brutally punish rebels, who accept their torture as atonement for the crimes of others.

After the suppression of the revolt, the vast majority of Jews were sent into exile; shortly thereafter (c. 200), Judah ha-Nasi edited together centuries of priestly judgements and oral traditions into an authoritative code, the Mishnah. This marks the transformation of Pharisaic Judaism into Rabbinic Judaism.

Although the Rabbis traced their origins to the Pharisees, Rabbinic Judaism nevertheless involved a radical repudiation of certain elements of this school of thought – elements that were basic to Second Temple Judaism. The Pharisees had been partisan. Members of different sects argued with one another over the correctness of their respective interpretations, see also Hillel and Shammai. After the destruction of the Second Temple, these sectarian divisions ended. The term "Pharisee" was no longer used, perhaps because it was a term more often used by non-Pharisees, but also because the term was explicitly sectarian. The Rabbis claimed leadership over all Jews, and added to the Amidah the birkat haMinim (see Council of Jamnia), a prayer which in part exclaims, "Praised are You O Lord, who breaks enemies and defeats the arrogant," and which is understood as a rejection of sectarians and sectarianism. This shift by no means resolved conflicts over the interpretation of the Torah; rather, it relocated debates between sects to debates within Rabbinic Judaism.

=== The emergence of Christianity ===
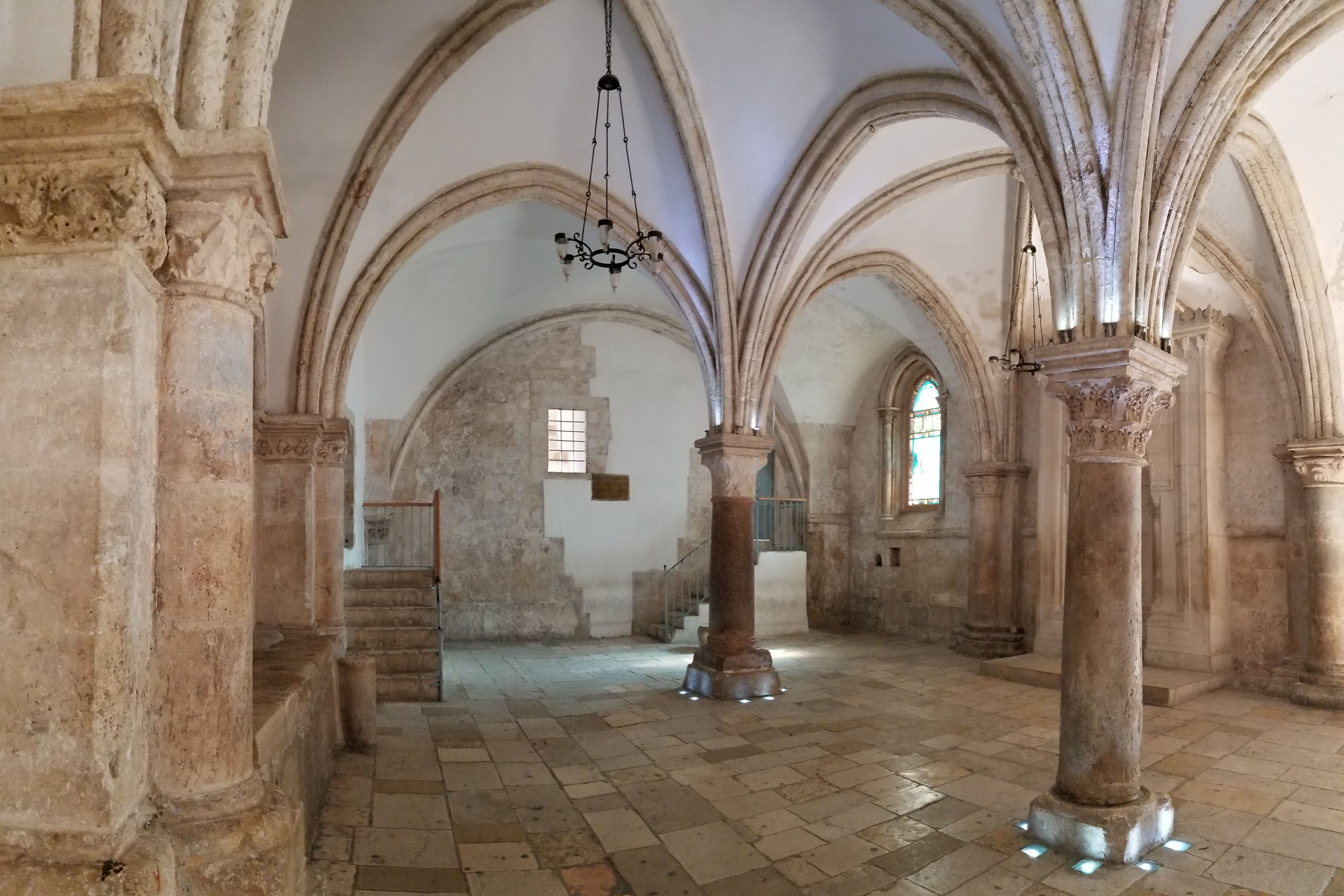
The Cenacle on Mount Zion in Jerusalem, claimed to be the location of the Last Supper and Pentecost

Paula Fredriksen, in From Jesus to Christ, has suggested that Jesus' impact on his followers was so great that they could not accept this failure. According to the New Testament, some Christians believed that they encountered Jesus after his crucifixion; they argued that he had been resurrected (the belief in the resurrection of the dead in the messianic age was a core Pharisaic doctrine), and would soon return to usher in the Kingdom of God and fulfill the rest of Messianic prophecy such as the Resurrection of the dead and the Last Judgment. Others adapted Gnosticism as a way to maintain the vitality and validity of Jesus' teachings (see Elaine Pagels, The Gnostic Gospels). Since early Christians believed that Jesus had already replaced the Temple as the expression of a new covenant, they were relatively unconcerned with the destruction of the Temple, though it came to be viewed as symbolic of the doctrine of supersessionism.

According to Shaye J.D. Cohen, modern historians of Hellenistic Judaism see that Jesus' failure to establish the Kingdom of God and his death at the hands of the Romans invalidated any messianic claims (see for comparison: prophet and false prophet).

According to many historians, most of Jesus' teachings were intelligible and acceptable in terms of Second Temple Judaism; what set Christians apart from Jews was their faith in Christ as the resurrected messiah. The belief in a resurrected Messiah is unacceptable to Jews today and to Rabbinic Judaism, and modern Jewish theologians have long used this fact to explain the break between Judaism and Christianity. Recent work by historians paints a more complex portrait of late Second Temple Judaism and early Christianity. Some historians have suggested that, before his death, Jesus forged among his believers such certainty that the Kingdom of God and the resurrection of the dead was at hand, that with few exceptions (John 20: 24–29) when they saw him shortly after his execution, they had no doubt that he had been resurrected, and that the restoration of the Kingdom and resurrection of the dead was at hand. These specific beliefs were compatible with Second Temple Judaism. In the following years the restoration of the Kingdom as Jews expected it failed to occur. Some Christians believed instead that Christ, rather than being the Jewish messiah, was God made flesh, who died for the sins of humanity, and that faith in Jesus Christ offered everlasting life (see Christology).

The foundation for this new interpretation of Jesus' crucifixion and resurrection are found in the epistles of Paul and in the Book of Acts. Most Jews view Paul as the founder of Christianity, who is responsible for the break with Judaism. Recently, Talmud scholar Daniel Boyarin has argued that Paul's theology of the spirit is more deeply rooted in Hellenistic Judaism than generally believed. In A Radical Jew, Boyarin argues that Paul the Apostle combined the life of Jesus with Greek philosophy to reinterpret the Hebrew Bible in terms of the Platonic opposition between the ideal (which is real) and the material (which is false); see also Paul the Apostle and Judaism. Judaism is a corporeal religion, in which membership is based not on belief but rather descent from Abraham, physically marked by circumcision, and focusing on how to live this life properly. Paul saw in the symbol of a resurrected Jesus the possibility of a spiritual rather than corporeal messiah. He used this notion of messiah to argue for a religion through which all people — not just descendants of Abraham — could worship the God of Abraham. Unlike Judaism, which holds that it is the proper religion only of the Jews, Pauline Christianity claimed to be the proper religion for all people.

In other words, by appealing to the Platonic distinction between the material and the ideal, Paul showed how the spirit of Christ could provide all people a way to worship God — the God who had previously been worshipped only by Jews, although Jews claimed that he was the one and only God of all. Boyarin roots Paul's work in Hellenistic Judaism and insists that Paul was thoroughly Jewish. But, Boyarin argues, Pauline theology made his version of Christianity very appealing to Gentiles. Nevertheless, Boyarin also sees this Platonic reworking of both Jesus's teachings and Pharisaic Judaism as essential to the emergence of Christianity as a distinct religion, because it justified a Judaism without Jewish law (see also New Covenant).

The above events and trends led to a gradual separation between Christianity and Rabbinic Judaism. According to historian Shaye J.D. Cohen, "Early Christianity ceased to be a Jewish sect when it ceased to observe Jewish practices."

Among the Jewish practices abandoned by proto-orthodox Christianity, circumcision was rejected as a requirement at the Council of Jerusalem, c. 50, Sabbath observance was modified, perhaps as early as Ignatius' Epistle to the Magnesians 9.1, and Quartodecimanism (observation of the Paschal feast on Nisan 14, the day of preparation for Passover, linked to Polycarp and thus to John the Apostle) was formally rejected at the First Council of Nicaea.

== See also ==
- Christianity and Judaism
- Christ myth theory
- Culture of ancient Rome
- Hellenistic Greece
- Historicity of Jesus
- History of ancient Israel and Judah
- Jesus in the Christian Bible
- Jesus in the Talmud
- Jesus Seminar
- Julio-Claudian dynasty
- Roman Empire
- Romanitas

== Sources ==
=== Primary sources ===
- Flavius Josephus, Antiquities of the Jews 93CE
- The New Testament (the half of the Christian Bible that provides an account of Jesus's life and teachings, and the orthodox history of the early Christian Church)
- The Talmud (the main compendium of Rabbinal debates, legends, and laws)
- The Tanakh (the redacted collection of Jewish religious writings from the period)

=== Secondary sources ===
- Akers, Keith (2000). The Lost Religion of Jesus: Simple Living and Nonviolence in Early Christianity (New York: Lantern Books). (Foreword by Walter Wink.)
- Bermejo-Rubio, Fernando (2017). Feldt, Laura; Valk, Ülo (eds.). "The Process of Jesus' Deification and Cognitive Dissonance Theory". Numen. 64 (2–3). Leiden: Brill Publishers: 119–152. doi:10.1163/15685276-12341457. eISSN 1568-5276. ISSN 0029-5973. JSTOR 44505332. S2CID 148616605.
- Boyarin, Daniel (1997). A Radical Jew: Paul and the Politics of Identity ISBN 0-520-21214-2
- Catchpole, D. R. (1971). The Trial of Jesus: a study in the gospels and Jewish historiographyfrom 1770 to the present day Leiden: Brill
- Chilton, Bruce, Evans, Craig A. and Neusner, Jacob ed. (2002). The Missing Jesus: Rabbinic Judaism and the New Testament. ISBN 0-391-04183-5.
- Cohen, Shaye J.D. (1988). From the Maccabees to the Mishnah ISBN 0-664-25017-3
- Cohen, Shaye J.D. (2001). The Beginnings of Jewishness: Boundaries, Varieties, Uncertainties ISBN 0-520-22693-3
- Cook, Michael (2008) Modern Jews Engage the new Testament: Enhancing Jewish Well-being in a Christian Environment, ISBN 978-1-58023-313-2
- Crossan, John Dominic (1991). The Historical Jesus: The Life of a Mediterranean Jewish Peasant, ISBN 0-06-061629-6
- Ehrman, Bart (2003). The New Testament: A Historical Introduction to the Early Christian Writings, ISBN 0-19-515462-2
- Fredriksen, Paula (1988). From Jesus to Christ: The Origins of the New Testament Images of Jesus. New Haven, CT: Yale University Press. ISBN 0-300-04864-5.
- Fredriksen, Paula (1999). Jesus of Nazareth, King of the Jews: A Jewish Life and the Emergence of Christianity ISBN 0-679-76746-0
- Meier, John P., A Marginal Jew: Rethinking the Historical Jesus,
  - (1991), V.1, The Roots of the Problem and the Person ISBN 0-385-26425-9
  - (1994). V.2, Mentor, Message, and Miracles ISBN 0-385-46992-6
  - (2001). V.3, Companions and Competitors ISBN 0-385-46993-4
- Neusner, Jacob Torah From our Sages: Pirke Avot ISBN 0-940646-05-6
- Neusner, Jacob. Judaism When Christianity Began: A Survey of Belief and Practice. Louisville: Westminster John Knox, 2003. ISBN 0-664-22527-6
- Orlinsky, H. M. ( 1971). "The Seer-Priest" in W.H. Allen The World History of the Jewish People, Vol.3: Judges pp. 269–279.
- Pagels, Elaine The Gnostic Gospels 1989 ISBN 0-679-72453-2
- Sanders, E.P. (1996). The Historical Figure of Jesus, Penguin ISBN 0-14-014499-4
- Sanders, E.P. (1987). Jesus and Judaism, Fortress Press ISBN 0-8006-2061-5
- Schwartz, Leo, ed. Great Ages and Ideas of the Jewish People. ISBN 0-394-60413-X
- Vermes, Geza Jesus the Jew: A Historian's Reading of the Gospels. ISBN 0-8006-1443-7
- Vermes, Geza, The Religion of Jesus the Jew. ISBN 0-8006-2797-0
- Vermes, Geza, Jesus in his Jewish context. ISBN 0-8006-3623-6

History of Christianity: Early Christianity
Historical background / First century / Followed by: Christianity in the 2nd century
BC	C1	C2	C3	C4	C5	C6	C7	C8	C9	C10
C11	C12	C13	C14	C15	C16	C17	C18	C19	C20	C21
