= Heaven (disambiguation) =

Heaven is the place where deities originate, and where earthly beings may experience an afterlife.

The heavens commonly refers to the celestial sphere, the sky as seen from the Earth.

Heaven may also refer to:

== In religion ==
- Heaven in Judaism
- Garden of Eden
- Heaven in Christianity
- Heaven in Islam
- Jannah, Paradise in Islam
- Paradise, the abode of the righteous dead in religious traditions from around the world
- Tian, a concept translated as Heaven central to Chinese religion and philosophy

== People ==
=== Surname ===
- Ayden Heaven (born 2006), English footballer
- Constance Heaven (1911–1995) or Christina Merlin, British writer of romance novels
- Dave Heaven (born 1959), British musician
- Frank Heaven (1873–1905), cricketer and football administrator
- John Heaven (1723–1794), mayor of Bedford, England

=== Given name ===
- Heaven Tanudiredja (born 1982), Indonesian fashion designer in Belgium
- Heaven Peralejo (born 1999), Filipina actress, model and singer

== Films ==
- Heaven (1987 film), a documentary written and produced by Diane Keaton
- Heaven (1998 film), a crime drama starring Martin Donovan
- Heaven (2000 film), a Canadian comedy-drama film directed by Jean-Sébastien Lord
- Heaven (2002 film), a drama/romantic thriller directed by Tom Tykwer starring Cate Blanchett and Giovanni Ribisi
- Heaven (2018 film), a dramatic television film starring Annalise Basso based on the V. C. Andrews novel
- Heaven (2022 film), a Malayalam film directed by Unni Govindraj starring Suraj Venjaramoodu

== Literature ==
- Heaven (Andrews novel), 1985, by V. C. Andrews
- Heaven (Kawakami novel), 2009, by Mieko Kawakami
- Heaven (Stewart and Cohen novel), a 2004 novel by Ian Stewart and Jack Cohen
- Heaven, a 1998 novel by Angela Johnson
- Heaven, a manga by Aoi Nanase
- Heaven!!, a manga by Shizuru Seino
- Heaven (Oh My Goddess!), a fictional divine faction in the manga

== Music ==
=== Performers and labels ===
- Heaven (Australian band), a heavy metal group
- Heaven (British band), a jazz-rock group in the late 1960s and early 1970s
- Heaven (Romanian band), a pop-dance girl group
- Heaven Music, an independent record label in Athens, Greece
- Heaven Records, the record label of Fat Tulips

=== Albums ===
- Heaven (Cosmic Baby album), 1999
- Heaven (Dilly Dally album) or the title song, 2018
- Heaven (DJ Sammy album) or the title cover of the Bryan Adams song (see below), 2002
- Heaven (Rebecca Ferguson album), 2011
- Heaven (Nina Girado album) or the title song (see below), 2002
- Heaven (Miliyah Kato album) or the title song, 2010
- Heaven (Ron Miles album), 2002
- Heaven (Mobius Band album), 2007
- Heaven (Pomegranates album) or the title song, 2012
- Heaven (Jason Rowe album) or the title song, 1997
- Heaven (Shockabilly album), 1985
- Heaven (Cleo Sol album), 2023
- Heaven (The Walkmen album) or the title song, 2012
- Heaven (BeBe & CeCe Winans album) or the title song, 1988
- Heaven, by the Avener, 2020
- Heaven, by Jimmy Scott, 1996
- Heaven, by U96, or the title song (see below), 1996
- Heavn, by Jamila Woods, or the title song, 2016

=== Songs ===
- "Heaven" (After School song), 2013
- "Heaven" (Ailee song), 2012
- "Heaven" (Avicii song), 2019
- "Heaven" (Ayumi Hamasaki song), 2005
- "Heaven" (Beyoncé song), 2013
- "Heaven" (1977 Bonnie Tyler song)
- "Heaven" (Bryan Adams song), 1985, covered by DJ Sammy and Yanou featuring Do, 2001
- "Heaven" (Buck-Tick song), 2008
- "Heaven" (The Chimes song), 1989
- "Heaven" (Chris Rea song), 1991
- "Heaven" (D mol song), represented Montenegro at Eurovision 2019
- "Heaven" (Depeche Mode song), 2013
- "Heaven" (Emeli Sandé song), 2011
- "Heaven" (Inna song), 2016
- "Heaven" (Jay-Z song), 2013
- "Heaven" (Joan Armatrading song), 1983
- "Heaven" (John Legend song), 2006
- "Heaven" (Jónsi song), represented Iceland at Eurovision 2004
- "Heaven" (Julia Michaels song), 2018
- "Heaven" (Kane Brown song), 2017
- "Heaven" (Live song), 2003
- "Heaven" (Los Lonely Boys song), 2004
- "Heaven" (Namie Amuro song), 2013
- "Heaven" (Niall Horan song), 2023
- "Heaven" (Nina Girado song), 2002
- "Heaven" (The Psychedelic Furs song), 1984
- "Heaven" (Shaun Frank and Kshmr song), 2015
- "Heaven" (Solo song), 1995
- "Heaven" (Taeyeon song), 2024
- "Heaven" (Talking Heads song), 1979
- "Heaven" (Troye Sivan song), 2015
- "Heaven" (U96 song), 1996
- "Heaven" (Warrant song), 1989
- "Heaven (Must Be There)", by Eurogliders, 1984
- "Heaven"/"Squall", a double A-side single by Masaharu Fukuyama, 1999
- "(Feels Like) Heaven", by Fiction Factory, 1983
- "Heaven", by 3 Doors Down from Time of My Life, 2011
- "Heaven", by Abandon All Ships from Geeving, 2010
- "Heaven", by Alpha Rev from New Morning, 2010
- "Heaven", by Andy Black from The Ghost of Ohio, 2019
- "Heaven", by Angels & Airwaves from I-Empire, 2007
- "Heaven", by Ava Max from Heaven & Hell, 2020
- "Heaven", by Bazzi, 2022
- "Heaven", by Becky Hill, 2023
- "Heaven", by Better Than Ezra from Deluxe, 1993
- "Heaven", by Bitter:Sweet from The Mating Game, 2006
- "Heaven", by Blink-182 from Nine, 2019
- "Heaven", by Bonnie Tyler from All in One Voice, 1998
- "Heaven", by Brett Dennen from Hope for the Hopeless, 2008
- "Heaven", by Calum Scott from Bridges, 2022
- "Heaven", by Carl Wilson from Carl Wilson, 1981
- "Heaven", by Cheryl Cole from 3 Words, 2009
- "Heaven", by the Cockroaches from The Cockroaches, 1987
- "Heaven", by Demi Lovato from Holy Fvck, 2022
- "Heaven", by Duke Ellington from Second Sacred Concert, 1968
- "Heaven", by Dune, 2000
- "Heaven", by Ed Sheeran from Play, 2025
- "Heaven", by En Vogue from Soul Flower, 2004
- "Heaven", by Eurythmics from Savage, 1987
- "Heaven", by Exo from Ex'Act, 2016
- "Heaven", by Finneas, 2018
- "Heaven", by the Fire Theft from The Fire Theft, 2003
- "Heaven", by Fits of Gloom, 1994
- "Heaven", by Fitz and the Tantrums from Let Yourself Free, 2022
- "Heaven", by Gabi DeMartino, 2023
- "Heaven", by Geraint Watkins, 2004
- "Heaven", by Gibson Brothers, 1977
- "Heaven", by Gotthard from Homerun, 2001
- "Heaven", by Guano Apes from Don't Give Me Names, 2000
- "Heaven", by Health from Health, 2007
- "Heaven", by Hurts from Exile, 2013
- "Heaven", by I Monster from Neveroddoreven, 2003
- "Heaven", by Janne Da Arc, 2006
- "Heaven", by Jake Owen from Barefoot Blue Jean Night, 2011
- "Heaven", by Jars of Clay from The Long Fall Back to Earth, 2009
- "Heaven", by John Frusciante from The Empyrean, 2009
- "Heaven", by K. Michelle from Kimberly: The People I Used to Know, 2017
- "Heaven", by Kelly Rowland from Simply Deep, 2022
- "Heaven", by Khalid from Free Spirit, 2019
- "Heaven", by Mayday Parade from What It Means to Fall Apart, 2021
- "Heaven", by Mitski from The Land Is Inhospitable and So Are We, 2023
- "Heaven", by Monsta X from One of a Kind, 2021
- "Heaven", by Nas from God's Son, 2002
- "Heaven", by Natalia Kills from Perfectionist, 2011
- "Heaven", by Nelly from M.O., 2013
- "Heaven", by Nidji, 2005
- "Heaven", by No Doubt from Push and Shove, 2012
- "Heaven", by Nu Flavor, 1997
- "Heaven", by OneRepublic from Oh My My, 2016
- "Heaven", by P-Model from Perspective, 1982
- "Heaven", by Pvris from All We Know of Heaven, All We Need of Hell, 2017
- "Heaven", by the Rapture from Echoes, 2003
- "Heaven", by the Rascals from Freedom Suite, 1969
- "Heaven", by RM from Right Place, Wrong Person, 2024
- "Heaven", by the Rolling Stones from Tattoo You, 1981
- "Heaven", by Swans from Greed, 1986
- "Heaven", by Taemin from Never Gonna Dance Again, 2020
- "Heaven", by Tigertailz from Bezerk, 1990
- "Heaven", by Timofey & Bartosz Brenes vs. Terri B
- "Heaven", by Todrick Hall from Forbidden, 2018
- "Heaven", by Tomorrow X Together from The Star Chapter: Sanctuary, 2024
- "Heaven", by Tweet from Southern Hummingbird, 2002
- "Heaven", by UGK from Underground Kingz, 2007
- "Heaven", by Unkle from More Stories, 2008
- "Heaven", by Until December, 1986
- "Heaven (Don't Have a Name)", by Sam Feldt, 2018
- "Heaven (Little by Little)", by Theory of a Deadman from Scars & Souvenirs, 2008

== Other uses ==
- Heaven (nightclub), in London, UK
- Heaven (play), 2011, by Kit Brookman
- Heaven Rubber Bandit, a 1990s US rubber-band-powered aircraft

== See also ==
- Heaven and Hell (disambiguation)
- Heavenly (disambiguation)
- Heavens (disambiguation)
- Hell (disambiguation)
- Paradise (disambiguation)
- Seven heavens, a summary of commonalities among the major religions
  - Seventh Heaven (disambiguation)
- Heaven on Earth (disambiguation)
