= Did Jesus Exist? (Ehrman book) =

2012 book by Bart D. Ehrman

Did Jesus Exist? The Historical Argument for Jesus of Nazareth
- Author: Bart D. Ehrman
- Language: English
- Subjects: Historical Jesus; Historicity of Jesus
- Publisher: HarperOne
- Publication date: 2012
- Publication place: United States
- Media type: Print (paperback)
- Pages: 368
- ISBN: 978-0062206442
- Preceded by: Forgery and Counterforgery
- Followed by: How Jesus Became God

Did Jesus Exist? The Historical Argument for Jesus of Nazareth is a 2012 book by Bart D. Ehrman, a scholar of the New Testament. In this book, written to counter the idea that there was never such a person as Jesus of Nazareth at all, Ehrman sets out to demonstrate the historical evidence for Jesus' existence, and he aims to state why all experts in the area agree that "whatever else you may think about Jesus, he certainly did exist."

Ehrman examines the historicity of Jesus and includes some criticism of Christ mythicists. As he does in other works such as Forged and Jesus, Interrupted, he disregards an apologetics-based or otherwise religiously-charged approach to aim at looking at the New Testament using historical-critical methodology. He argues that a specific historical Jesus really existed in the 1st century AD. Even as accounts about that figure later on brought in additional misinformation and legendary stories, Ehrman states, multiple reasons still remain to see things as framed around a flesh-and-blood actual person.

== Arguments for existence ==
Ehrman surveys the arguments Christ mythicists have made against the existence of Jesus since the idea was first mooted at the end of the 18th century. To the objection that there are no contemporary Roman records of Jesus' existence, Ehrman points out that such records exist for almost no one and there are mentions of Christ in several Roman and Jewish works of history from only decades after the Crucifixion of Jesus, such as Josephus's Antiquities of the Jews and Tacitus's Annals. The author states that the authentic letters of the apostle Paul in the New Testament (which Ehrman believes are 1 Thessalonians, Galatians, 1 Corinthians, Philippians, Philemon, 2 Corinthian and Romans) were likely written within a few years of Jesus' death and that Paul likely personally knew James the Just and Peter the Apostle. Although the gospel accounts of Jesus' life may be biased and unreliable in many respects, Ehrman writes, they and the sources behind them which scholars have discerned still contain some accurate historical information. So many independent attestations of Jesus' existence, Ehrman says, are actually "astounding for an ancient figure of any kind".

Ehrman dismisses the idea that the story of Jesus is an invention based on pagan myths of dying-and-rising gods, maintaining that the early Christians were primarily influenced by Jewish ideas, not Greek or Roman ones, and repeatedly underlining that the idea that there was never such a person as Jesus is not seriously considered by historians or experts in the field at all.

Many specific points by Ehrman concentrate on what may be regarded as the 'embarrassments' and 'failures' of the various depictions of Jesus Christ found in the gospels and the works of Paul which point to an account based on a real person, which was embellished, rather than a made-up figure. He notes that Jews in the first century AD expected their Messiah to come from Bethlehem, and Jesus is described as growing up in Nazareth, a dilemma that is simply not addressed in the Gospel of Mark (which has no nativity account) even though it is regarded as the earliest gospel. The betrayal of Jesus by Judas is another example, as critics of early Christianity found it strange that the Messiah would display the lack of personal awareness and foresight even to keep his close followers in line. Ehrman states that such things would make sense for a historical Jesus, who multiple people believed to have grown up, lived, and died in a certain time and place, as opposed to a purely-mythological figure with malleable personal details.

== Criticism of mythicists ==
Ehrman, who was a fundamentalist Christian before becoming an agnostic atheist, has written numerous books challenging traditional views of the Bible himself. Did Jesus Exist?, however, contains scathing criticism of the "writers, bloggers and Internet junkies who call themselves mythicists". Ehrman says that they do not define what they mean by "myth" and maintains they are really motivated by a desire to denounce religion rather than examine historical evidence. He discusses leading contemporary mythicists by name and dismisses their arguments as "amateurish", "wrong-headed", and "outlandish".

== Reception ==
Speaking with The Huffington Post, United Methodist pastor and biblical scholar Ben Witherington III (who is usually very critical of Ehrman's works) praised the book and thanked Ehrman for writing it. The Christian Science Monitor wrote that "His [Ehrman's] newest book has turned some of his perennial critics into fans, at least temporarily".

One of the mythicists who is criticized in Did Jesus Exist?, Richard Carrier, challenged many of the book's points on his blog, to which Ehrman responded on his own blog. Another scholar criticised in the book, Thomas L. Thompson, responded with the online article, Is This Not the Carpenter’s Son? A Response to Bart Ehrman, in which he rejects Ehrman's characterization of his views, stating that, contrarily to what Ehrman claims, he never denied the historicity of Jesus. However, Ehrman's positions were defended by New Testament scholar Maurice Casey, who dismissed Thompson's theories as "completely wrong from beginning to end".

New Testament scholar R. Joseph Hoffmann, who has repeatedly criticized supporters of the Christ Myth Theory, nevertheless called the book "exceptionally disappointing and not an adequate rejoinder to the routinely absurd ideas of the Jesus-deniers."

British New Testament scholar Maurice Casey praised Ehrman's book, but also stated that it contains "a small number of regrettable mistakes, grossly exaggerated by mythicists". He therefore proceeded to write a book against the mythicist position himself, called Jesus: Evidence and Argument or Mythicist Myths?.

In response, in 2021, Jesus mythicists John W. Loftus and Robert M. Price published an anthology called Varieties of Jesus Mythicism: Did He Even Exist? that included a chapter addressing Ehrman's case for historicity.

== See also ==
- History of early Christianity
- The Christ Conspiracy: The Greatest Story Ever Sold
- The Jesus Mysteries
