= Forged (book) =

Book by Bart D. Ehrman

Forged: Writing in the Name of God – Why the Bible's Authors Are Not Who We Think They Are
- First edition
- Author: Bart D. Ehrman
- Language: English
- Subject: Authorship of the New Testament
- Publisher: HarperCollins
- Publication date: 2011
- Pages: 320 pages
- ISBN: 0-06-207863-1
- Preceded by: Jesus, Interrupted: Revealing the Hidden Contradictions in the Bible (And Why We Don't Know About Them)
- Followed by: The Apocryphal Gospels: Texts and Translations

Forged: Writing in the Name of God – Why the Bible's Authors Are Not Who We Think They Are is a book by American New Testament scholar Bart D. Ehrman, published in 2011 by HarperCollins. The book posits that between eight and eleven of the twenty-seven books of the Christian New Testament canon were written as forgeries.

== Arguments and contentions ==
In antiquity, pseudepigraphy was an accepted practice in which a writer attributed his work to a well-known figure from the past or a teacher who had greatly influenced him. Forged contends that the practice was not in fact accepted and would have been condemned as dishonest by all authorities in antiquity. Ehrman maintains that the more honest term for such falsely attributed writings is "forgery".

Ehrman points out numerous inconsistencies he finds within the New Testament that appear to support many of his claims, such as the fact that in Acts 4, the statement is made that both Peter and John were illiterate, yet in later years entire books of the Bible were then alleged to have been written by them.

=== New Testament books identified as forgeries by Ehrman ===
- First Epistle of Peter
- Second Epistle of Peter
- Second Epistle to the Thessalonians
- First Epistle to Timothy
- Second Epistle to Timothy
- Epistle to Titus
- Epistle to the Ephesians
- Epistle to the Colossians
- Epistle of Jude
- Epistle of James (Ehrman notes that the author does not specify which James he is, meaning "that he is claiming to be the most famous James of all, Jesus's brother")

=== False attributions ===
In addition to the books of the New Testament Ehrman identifies as forgeries, he discusses eight originally anonymous New Testament texts that had names of apostles ascribed to them later and are falsely attributed. These are not forgeries since the texts are anonymous but have had false authors ascribed to them by others:

- Gospel of Matthew
- Gospel of Mark
- Gospel of Luke
- Gospel of John
- The Acts of the Apostles
- First Epistle of John
- Second Epistle of John
- Third Epistle of John
- Epistle to the Hebrews

In addition, Ehrman asserts that the Old Testament books Daniel and Ecclesiastes, whose authors claim to be Daniel (in part of the Book of Daniel) and Solomon respectively, are forgeries, noting that they were written after those men's respective deaths.

== Reviews ==
The book was reviewed by the Library Journal which recommended the book for "sophisticated readers who will come to their own conclusions".

United Methodist pastor and biblical scholar Ben Witherington III (Asbury Theological Seminary) wrote a critique of Ehrman's positions in his blog. Presbyterian pastor and biblical scholar Michael J. Kruger (Reformed Theological Seminary) also wrote a detailed critique of Ehrman's book for the journal Themelios.

== See also ==
- Jesus, Interrupted, another New York Times bestseller by Ehrman
- Misquoting Jesus, a New York Times bestseller by Ehrman
