= Jesus, Interrupted =

Book by Bart D. Ehrman

Jesus, Interrupted: Revealing the Hidden Contradictions in the Bible (And Why We Don't Know About Them)
- First edition
- Author: Bart D. Ehrman
- Language: English
- Subject: Internal consistency of the Bible
- Publisher: HarperCollins
- Publication date: March 2009
- Pages: 304 pages
- ISBN: 0-06-117393-2
- OCLC: 262888322
- Preceded by: God's Problem: How the Bible Fails to Answer Our Most Important Question – Why We Suffer (2008)
- Followed by: Forged: Writing in the Name of God – Why the Bible's Authors Are Not Who We Think They Are

Jesus, Interrupted: Revealing the Hidden Contradictions in the Bible (and Why We Don't Know About Them) is a book by Bart D. Ehrman, a New Testament scholar at University of North Carolina at Chapel Hill. Published by HarperCollins in 2009, the work includes a narrative of Ehrman's own progression in Biblical studies and beliefs, an overview of the issues raised by scholarly analysis of the Bible, a selection of findings from such analysis, and an exhortation about the importance of understanding the Bible more fully.

Of the importance of Biblical study, Ehrman writes in the preface, "This kind of information is relevant not only to scholars like me, who devote their lives to serious research, but also to everyone who is interested in the Bible—whether they personally consider themselves believers or not. In my opinion this really matters. Whether you are a believer—fundamentalist, evangelical, moderate, liberal—or a nonbeliever, the Bible is the most significant book in the history of our civilization. Coming to understand what it actually is, and is not, is one of the most important intellectual endeavors that anyone in our society can embark upon."

One statement early in the book appears to summarize the development of the subject matter that Ehrman attempts to cover: "Scholars of the Bible have made significant progress in understanding the Bible over the past two hundred years, building on archaeological discoveries, advances in our knowledge of the ancient Hebrew and Greek languages in which the book of Scripture were originally written, and deep and penetrating historical, literary, and textual analyses."

== Reception ==
Jesus, Interrupted became a New York Times best-seller, joining Ehrman's previous popular work of textual criticism Misquoting Jesus. Critics applauded Ehrman's writing ability.

Michael J. Kruger, Associate Professor of New Testament at Reformed Theological Seminary, reviewed the book in the Westminster Theological Journal, calling it "a book full of ironies" and "intellectual schizophrenia [...] it purports to be about unbiased history but rarely presents an opposing viewpoint; ironic that it claims to follow the scholarly consensus but breaks from it so often; ironic that it insists on the historical-critical method but then reads the gospels with a modernist, overly-literal hermeneutic; ironic that it claims no one view of early Christianity could be 'right' (Walter Bauer) but then proceeds to tell us which view of early Christianity is 'right'".

Another criticism, which was also raised about Misquoting Jesus, is that Ehrman implies that the information he presents is new or groundbreaking. United Methodist bishop William H. Willimon wrote, "He keeps presenting this stuff as if this is wonderful new knowledge that has been kept from you backward lay people and this is the stuff your preachers don't have the guts to tell, and I have." But Ehrman repeats throughout the book that he is presenting information that in many cases restates what "scholars have been talking about for two hundred years, that professors in universities and seminaries have known and taught for as long as many of us have been alive".

Rich Barlow wrote in The Boston Globe that "he repeatedly stresses that historical-critical study need not kill faith. And, honest scholar that he is, he admits that some of his contentions can be challenged." James F. McGrath (Butler University) wrote on Patheos that the book is "a readable overview presenting information about the Bible and early Christianity that ought by now to be common knowledge. The reason it is not probably is due largely to the belief that such critical study of the Bible is antithetical to the Christian faith, and that the appropriate Christian stance is to affirm the Bible's inerrancy rather than allow one's view of the Bible and other matters to be shaped by the Bible's actual contents."

== Bibliography ==
- Jesus, Interrupted: Revealing the Hidden Contradictions in the Bible (And Why We Don't Know About Them). HarperCollins, United States. 2009. ISBN 978-0-06-117393-6.
