= Bart D. Ehrman =

American biblical scholar (born 1955)

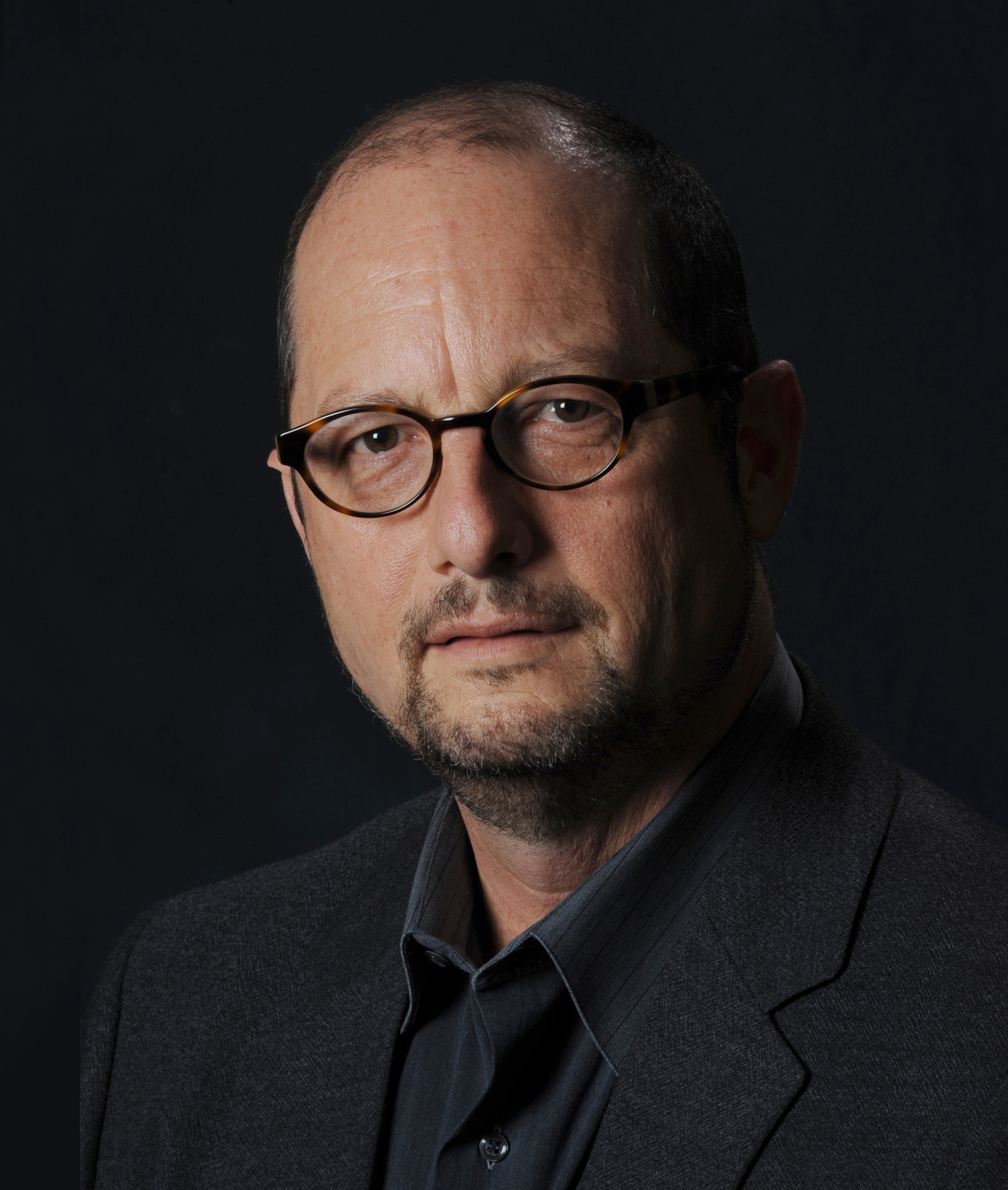
- Ehrman in 2012
- Born: Bart Denton Ehrman; October 5, 1955 (age 71); Lawrence, Kansas, U.S.
- Spouse: Sarah Beckwith

Academic background
- Education: Moody Bible Institute; Wheaton College (BA); Princeton Theological Seminary (MDiv, PhD)
- Thesis: The Gospel Text of Didymus (1985)
- Doctoral advisor: Bruce M. Metzger

Academic work
- Discipline: Biblical studies
- Institutions: Rutgers University; University of North Carolina at Chapel Hill
- Main interests: Textual criticism of the New Testament; Historical Jesus; Early Christian literature; Apostolic Fathers
- Notable works: Jesus: Apocalyptic Prophet of the New Millennium (1999); Misquoting Jesus (2005); Jesus, Interrupted (2009); Forged (2011); How Jesus Became God (2014); The Triumph of Christianity (2018); Heaven and Hell: A History of the Afterlife (2020)
- Website: bartehrman.com

Bart Denton Ehrman (born October 5, 1955) is an American biblical scholar whose research focuses on the textual criticism of the New Testament, the historical Jesus, and the origins and development of early Christianity. He is the James A. Gray Distinguished Professor of Religious Studies at the University of North Carolina at Chapel Hill. He is the author or editor of more than 30 books and has created nine lecture series with The Great Courses.

== Early life and education ==
Ehrman was born in 1955 in Lawrence, Kansas. He spent his childhood in Lawrence and Fremont, Nebraska. According to Ehrman, his parents came from small towns in Kansas and met while attending university after the Second World War, his father having enrolled under the G.I. Bill and his mother on a scholarship. His father worked as a salesman for a paper-box company, while his mother was a secretary.

Ehrman was raised in the Episcopal Church, where he served as an altar boy during his youth. He has described his family as regular churchgoers and his mother as particularly devout. He attended Lawrence High School, graduating in 1973, and was a member of the school's state championship debate team that year. At the age of 15, Ehrman underwent a born-again Christian conversion.

After high school, Ehrman enrolled at Moody Bible Institute in Chicago, where he studied the Bible and theology. He graduated in 1976 after completing the institute's three-year diploma program, which did not then confer a bachelor's degree. He then transferred to Wheaton College in Illinois, where he majored in English literature and studied Greek, graduating with a Bachelor of Arts in 1978. During his undergraduate studies, his Greek professor Gerald F. Hawthorne encouraged him to pursue graduate study under Bruce M. Metzger.

Ehrman entered Princeton Theological Seminary in 1978 to pursue graduate studies under Metzger. He received a Master of Divinity (M.Div.) degree in 1981 in biblical studies. Under Metzger's supervision, Ehrman wrote a master's thesis titled, New Testament Textual Criticism: Quest for Methodology. He then obtained a Ph.D. in New Testament studies in 1985 under Metzger's supervision. His dissertation was titled, The Gospel Text of Didymus: A Contribution to the Study of the Alexandrian Text.

== Career ==
Ehrman taught at Rutgers University from 1985 to 1988, then joined the University of North Carolina at Chapel Hill, where he has taught since 1988 and served as department chair from 2000 to 2006. He was named James A. Gray Distinguished Professor in 2003. In 2025, he announced that he is planning to retire from UNC at the end of the year. He has recorded multiple courses with The Teaching Company, including series on the New Testament and the historical Jesus. He is the author of widely assigned textbooks, including The New Testament: A Historical Introduction to the Early Christian Writings.

=== Scholarship and writings ===
Much of Ehrman's early scholarship addressed the Greek manuscript tradition of the New Testament and the ways theological controversy shaped textual transmission. His The Orthodox Corruption of Scripture argues that some scribal changes reflect early Christological debates. His Forgery and Counterforgery analyzes literary deceit and ancient charges of pseudepigraphy in early Christian polemics.

Ehrman has written for broader audiences on the historical Jesus and the development of Christian belief. Jesus: Apocalyptic Prophet of the New Millennium presents Jesus as a first-century Jewish apocalyptic preacher. Did Jesus Exist? defends the historical existence of Jesus against mythicist claims. Heaven and Hell: A History of the Afterlife and Journeys to Heaven and Hell study ancient afterlife traditions and their reception in early Christianity. Armageddon: What the Bible Really Says about the End examines the Book of Revelation and modern apocalyptic interpretation. Simon & Schuster released Love Thy Stranger on March 24, 2026.

=== Public engagement ===
Ehrman regularly lectures for public audiences and appears in media. He has recorded multiple series with The Great Courses and maintains a membership blog, The Bart Ehrman Blog, that donates all membership fees to charity, with more than $3 million reportedly raised by 2025. A 2020 Time essay summarized key claims in Heaven and Hell for general readers.

=== Awards and honors ===
Ehrman received the American Humanist Association's Religious Liberty Award in 2011. He held National Humanities Center fellowships in 2009–10 and 2018–19 for projects on ancient forgery and early Christian afterlife narratives. He has received multiple university teaching awards at UNC, including the Pope Center Spirit of Inquiry Teaching Award and the Undergraduate Students' Teaching Award. He was named a Guggenheim Fellow in 2018 in the field of Religion.

== Religious views ==
Ehrman has said he progressed from evangelical belief to agnosticism, identifying the problem of suffering as decisive for him. He has written, "the problem of suffering became for me the problem of faith" and has said, "I no longer go to church, no longer believe, no longer consider myself a Christian". In a 2008 interview he said that beginning around 2000, he realized that he "simply didn't believe that there was a God of any sort. It's not that I'm affirming and absolutely stating there is no God—I don't know if there's a God—but if there is a God, he certainly is not the God that I grew up to worship in the Christian tradition".

Ehrman has said that he is both agnostic and atheist and that "I usually confuse people when I tell them I'm both". "Atheism is a statement about faith and agnosticism is a statement about epistemology", he said.

Ehrman argues that Jesus of Nazareth "certainly" existed historically, and has summarized the claim in popular form "he did exist, whether we like it or not". His position on Christology is historical rather than confessional. In summarizing How Jesus Became God, NPR recorded his judgment that "Jesus himself didn't call himself God and didn't consider himself God". He has also written that Jesus did not teach postmortem reward and punishment as popularly conceived. In a 2020 essay he argued that Jesus proclaimed resurrection and the coming kingdom rather than eternal torment.

== Reception ==
Scholars have assessed Ehrman's trade books as effective popularization and as polemical in tone. Daniel B. Wallace's review of Misquoting Jesus in the Journal of the Evangelical Theological Society called the opening chapters "a very good" introduction to New Testament textual criticism, then argued that the book "paints a very bleak picture of scribal activity" and that Ehrman "overstates his case".

Larry Hurtado judged How Jesus Became God to be aimed at lay readers "generally unacquainted with this scholarly work" and warned that "a polemical agenda may well make for a lively discussion, but it also lessens somewhat his ability to give a balanced historical picture". Luke Timothy Johnson, reviewing the same book, described Ehrman as a practitioner of "counter-apologetics" and questioned the handling of resurrection experiences while acknowledging the clarity of the exposition.

Reception of later trade books has been mixed but their accessibility is generally noted. The Washington Independent Review of Books called The Triumph of Christianity "solidly grounded in first-rate scholarship". Kirkus Reviews called the book "accessible and intriguing but not groundbreaking".

Responding to Ehrman's critique in Forged of the idea that early Christians considered pseudonymous writing an acceptable literary practice, Michael J. Kruger wrote in Themelios that Ehrman is "absolutely correct that early Christians simply did not see it this way. To them, forgery was a lie, plain and simple". Academic reviews of the scholarly monograph Forgery and Counterforgery in Novum Testamentum, The Journal of Religion, and The Journal of Theological Studies have discussed the book's scope and definitions of forgery between 100-400AD, praising the documentation while debating the breadth of the term "forgery" and individual case judgments.

Alan Kirk argues that in Jesus Before the Gospels Ehrman cites memory research selectively, ignoring that Frederic Bartlett's experiment discovered that stories take on a stable, "schematic" form rather quickly, and that Ehrman also overemphasizes individual transmission instead of community, making a "lethal oversight" about Jan Vansina, whom he quotes as evidence for corruption in the Jesus tradition, changing his mind, arguing that information was conveyed through a community that placed controls rather than through chains of transmission easily subject to change. Kirk does sympathize with Ehrman that appealing to memory cannot automatically guarantee historicity.

Ehrman's popular work has drawn organized rejoinders as well as broad notice. Gary Kamiya wrote that evangelicals "attacked it as exaggerated, unfair and lacking a devotional tone", noting that "no fewer than three books were published in response" to Misquoting Jesus and Jesus, Interrupted. Evangelical scholars Andreas J. Köstenberger, Darrell L. Bock, and Josh D. Chatraw have disputed Ehrman's depiction of scholarly consensus, saying: "It is only by defining scholarship on his own terms and by excluding scholars who disagree with him that Ehrman is able to imply that he is supported by all other scholarship", but Michael R. Licona, scholar and Christian apologist, notes that Ehrman's "positions are those largely embraced by mainstream skeptical scholarship". In 2007, Timothy Paul Jones wrote Misquoting Truth: A Guide to the Fallacies of Bart Ehrman's "Misquoting Jesus", a book-length response to Misquoting Jesus and Lost Christianities. Novum Testamentum suggested that Misquoting Truth was a useful example of how conservative readers have engaged Ehrman's arguments. In 2014, Zondervan published How God Became Jesus, a response volume to How Jesus Became God by five scholars who contest aspects of Ehrman's reconstruction on historical and theological grounds.

== Personal life ==
Ehrman lives in North Carolina and is married to Sarah Beckwith, an English professor of medieval literature at Duke University.

== Works ==
=== Monographs and trade books ===
- Jesus: Apocalyptic Prophet of the New Millennium. New York, Oxford University Press, 1999.
- Truth and Fiction in The Da Vinci Code: A Historian Reveals What We Really Know about Jesus, Mary Magdalene, and Constantine. New York, Oxford University Press, 2004.
- Lost Christianities: The Battles for Scripture and the Faiths We Never Knew. New York, Oxford University Press, 2003.
- Lost Scriptures: Books That Did Not Make It into the New Testament. New York, Oxford University Press, 2003.
- Misquoting Jesus: The Story Behind Who Changed the Bible and Why. San Francisco, HarperSanFrancisco, 2005.
- Peter, Paul, and Mary Magdalene: The Followers of Jesus in History and Legend. New York, Oxford University Press, 2006.
- The Lost Gospel of Judas Iscariot: A New Look at Betrayer and Betrayed. New York, Oxford University Press, 2006.
- God's Problem: How the Bible Fails to Answer Our Most Important Question, Why We Suffer. New York, HarperOne, 2008.
- Jesus, Interrupted: Revealing the Hidden Contradictions in the Bible. New York, HarperOne, 2009.
- Forged: Writing in the Name of God. New York, HarperOne, 2011.
- Did Jesus Exist? The Historical Argument for Jesus of Nazareth. New York, HarperOne, 2012.
- Forgery and Counterforgery: The Use of Literary Deceit in Early Christian Polemics. New York, Oxford University Press, 2012.
- How Jesus Became God: The Exaltation of a Jewish Preacher from Galilee. San Francisco, HarperOne, 2014.
- Jesus Before the Gospels: How the Earliest Christians Remembered, Changed, and Invented Their Stories of the Savior. New York, HarperOne, 2016.
- The Triumph of Christianity: How a Forbidden Religion Swept the World. New York, Simon & Schuster, 2018.
- Heaven and Hell: A History of the Afterlife. New York, Simon & Schuster, 2020.
- Journeys to Heaven and Hell: Tours of the Afterlife in the Early Christian Tradition. New Haven, Yale University Press, 2022.
- Armageddon: What the Bible Really Says about the End. New York, Simon & Schuster, 2023.
- Love Thy Stranger: How the Teachings of Jesus Transformed the Moral Conscience of the West. New York, Simon & Schuster, 2026.

=== Textbooks and readers ===
- The New Testament: A Historical Introduction to the Early Christian Writings. New York, Oxford University Press, 1997, 8th ed. 2023.
- A Brief Introduction to the New Testament. New York, Oxford University Press, multiple eds., 5th ed. 2020.
- The Bible: A Historical and Literary Introduction. New York, Oxford University Press, 2013, 2nd ed. 2017.
- The New Testament and Other Early Christian Writings: A Reader. New York, Oxford University Press, 1998, 2nd ed. 2003.
- After the New Testament: 100–300 C.E., A Reader in Early Christianity. New York, Oxford University Press, 1999, 2nd ed. 2014.
- with Andrew S. Jacobs, Christianity in Late Antiquity, 300–450 C.E., A Reader. New York, Oxford University Press, 2004.

=== Critical editions and translations ===
- The Apostolic Fathers, Volume I and Volume II, Greek with English translation. Loeb Classical Library 24 and 25. Cambridge, Harvard University Press, 2003.
- with Zlatko Pleše, The Apocryphal Gospels: Texts and Translations. New York, Oxford University Press, 2011.
- with Zlatko Pleše, The Other Gospels: Accounts of Jesus from Outside the New Testament. New York, Oxford University Press, 2014.
- Didymus the Blind and the Text of the Gospels. Atlanta, Scholars Press for the Society of Biblical Literature, 1986.
- with Gordon D. Fee and Michael W. Holmes, The Text of the Fourth Gospel in the Writings of Origen, vol. 1. Atlanta, Scholars Press for the Society of Biblical Literature, 1992.

=== Edited volumes and collected essays ===
- with Michael W. Holmes, eds., The Text of the New Testament in Contemporary Research: Essays on the Status Quaestionis. Grand Rapids, Eerdmans, 1995, 2nd ed. Leiden, Brill, 2012.
- Studies in the Textual Criticism of the New Testament. Leiden, Brill, 2006.

=== Selected articles and essays ===
A full list appears in his curriculum vitae. The following items are frequently cited in scholarship.

- "Jesus' Trial Before Pilate: John 18:28–19:16". Religion 13, 1983.
- "Cephas and Peter". Journal of Biblical Literature 109, 1990, 463–474.
- "Heracleon, Origen, and the Text of the Fourth Gospel". Vigiliae Christianae 47, 1993, 105–118.
- "A Leper in the Hands of an Angry Jesus". in Studies in the Textual Criticism of the New Testament. Leiden, Brill, 2006.
- "The Text of the Gospels at the End of the Second Century". in C.-B. Amphoux and others, eds., Codex Bezae: Studies from the Lunel Colloquium. Turnhout, Brepols, 1996.

=== Courses ===
The Great Courses video or audio lecture series, 24 or 12 lectures unless noted

- The Historical Jesus.
- Lost Christianities: Christian Scriptures and the Battles over Authentication.
- From Jesus to Constantine: A History of Early Christianity.
- After the New Testament: The Writings of the Apostolic Fathers.
- History of the Bible: The Making of the New Testament Canon.
- The New Testament.
- The Triumph of Christianity.
- How Jesus Became God.
- The Greatest Controversies of Early Christian History.

Online short courses and webinars offered on BartEhrman.com

- Paul and Jesus: The Great Divide.
- Will You Be Left Behind? A History of the Rapture.
- Jesus the Secret Messiah.
- Finding Moses.
- The Other Virgin Births in Antiquity.
- The Unknown Gospels.
- In the Beginning: History, Legend, and Myth in Genesis.
- Did Jesus Think He Was God? A Closer Look at the Evidence.
- Did the Resurrection of Jesus Really Happen? debate with Michael Licona, webinar recording.
- Did the Christmas Story Really Happen? webinar.

=== Reference works ===
- with Bruce M. Metzger, The Text of the New Testament: Its Transmission, Corruption, and Restoration, 4th ed., co-editor. New York, Oxford University Press, 2005.
- Didymus the Blind and the Text of the Gospels (The New Testament in the Greek Fathers; No. 1). Society of Biblical Literature. 1987. ISBN 1-55540-084-1.
- The Text of the Fourth Gospel in the Writings of Origen (The New Testament in the Greek Fathers; vol. 1). Society of Biblical Literature. 1992. ISBN 1555407897.
- The Orthodox Corruption of Scripture: The Effect of Early Christological Controversies on the Text of the New Testament. Oxford University Press, US. 2011 [1993]. ISBN 978-0-19-973978-3.
- The Text of the New Testament in Contemporary Research: Essays on the Status Quaestionis. Wm. B. Eerdmans Publishing Company. 1995. ISBN 0-8028-4824-9.
- The New Testament: A Historical Introduction to the Early Christian Writings. Oxford University Press, US. 1997. ISBN 0-19-515462-2.
- The New Testament and Other Early Christian Writings: A Reader. Oxford University Press, US. 1998. ISBN 0-19-515464-9.
- After the New Testament: A Reader in Early Christianity. Oxford University Press, US. 1998. ISBN 0-19-511445-0.
- Jesus: Apocalyptic Prophet of the New Millennium. Oxford University Press, US. 1999. ISBN 0-19-512474-X.
- The Apostolic Fathers: Volume I. I Clement. II Clement. Ignatius. Polycarp. Didache. Harvard University Press. 2003. ISBN 0-674-99607-0.
- The Apostolic Fathers: Volume II. Epistle of Barnabas. Papias and Quadratus. Epistle to Diognetus. The Shepherd of Hermas. Harvard University Press. 2003. ISBN 0-674-99608-9.
- Lost Scriptures: Books that Did Not Make It into the New Testament. Oxford University Press, US. 2003. ISBN 0-19-514182-2.
- Lost Christianities: The Battles for Scripture and the Faiths We Never Knew. Oxford University Press, US. 2003. ISBN 0-19-514183-0.
- Ehrman, Bart; Jacobs, Andrew S. (2003). Christianity in Late Antiquity, 300–450 C.E.: A Reader. Oxford University Press, US. ISBN 0-19-515461-4.
- A Brief Introduction to the New Testament. Oxford University Press, US. 2004. ISBN 0-19-516123-8.
- Truth and Fiction in The Da Vinci Code: A Historian Reveals What We Really Know about Jesus, Mary Magdalene, and Constantine. Oxford University Press, US. 2004. ISBN 0-19-518140-9.
- Metzger, Bruce M.; Ehrman, Bart (2005). The Text of the New Testament: Its Transmission, Corruption, and Restoration. Oxford University Press, US. ISBN 0-19-516667-1.
- Misquoting Jesus: The Story Behind Who Changed the Bible and Why. HarperSanFrancisco. 2005. ISBN 0-06-073817-0.
- Peter, Paul, and Mary Magdalene: The Followers of Jesus in History and Legend. Oxford University Press, US. 2006. ISBN 0-19-530013-0.
- Studies in the Textual Criticism of the New Testament. Brill Publishers, US. 2006. ISBN 90-04-15032-3.
- The Lost Gospel of Judas Iscariot: A New Look at Betrayer and Betrayed. Oxford University Press, US. 2006. ISBN 978-0-19-531460-1.
- God's Problem: How the Bible Fails to Answer Our Most Important Question – Why We Suffer. HarperCollins, US. 2008. ISBN 978-0-06-117397-4.
- Jesus, Interrupted: Revealing the Hidden Contradictions in the Bible (And Why We Don't Know About Them). HarperCollins, US. 2009. ISBN 978-0-06-117394-3.
- Forged: Writing in the Name of God – Why the Bible's Authors Are Not Who We Think They Are. HarperCollins, US. 2011. ISBN 978-0-06-201261-6.
- Ehrman, Bart; Pleše, Zlatko (2011). The Apocryphal Gospels: Texts and Translations. Oxford University Press, US. ISBN 978-0-19-973210-4.
- Did Jesus Exist? The Historical Argument for Jesus of Nazareth. HarperCollins, US. 2012. ISBN 978-0-06-220460-8.
- Forgery and Counterforgery: The Use of Literary Deceit in Early Christian Polemics. Oxford University Press, US. 2012. ISBN 978-0-19-992803-3.
- The Bible: A Historical and Literary Introduction. Oxford University Press, US. 2013. ISBN 978-0-19-530816-7.
- The Other Gospels: Accounts of Jesus from Outside the New Testament. Oxford University Press, US. 2013. ISBN 978-0-19-933522-0.
- How Jesus Became God: The Exaltation of a Jewish Preacher from Galilee. HarperOne, US. 2014. ISBN 978-0-06-177818-6.
- Jesus Before the Gospels: How the Earliest Christians Remembered, Changed, and Invented Their Stories of the Savior. HarperOne, US. 2016. ISBN 978-0062285201.
- The Triumph of Christianity: How a Forbidden Religion Swept the World. Simon & Schuster, US. 2018. ISBN 978-1501136702.
- Heaven and Hell: A History of the Afterlife. Simon & Schuster, US. 2020. ISBN 978-1501136733.
- Journeys to Heaven and Hell: Tours of the Afterlife in the Early Christian Tradition. Yale University Press, US. 2022. ISBN 978-0300257007.
- Armageddon: What the Bible Really Says about the End. Simon & Schuster, US. 2023. ISBN 978-1982147990.
