= Heavens =

Heavens may refer to:

- The sky, low Earth orbit, or outer space (also celestial spheres or Biblical firmament)
- Heaven of general religious, theological, and metaphysical belief
- Seven Heavens a classic generally esoteric and metaphysical study of heaven
- Heavens (band), an American rock band
- Heavens (album), a 1987 album by Big Dipper
- "Heavens", a song by James from Seven

== People with the surname ==
- Jacyn Heavens (born 1983), English entrepreneur
- Jerome Heavens (born 1957), Canadian footballer
- Lucy Heavens, South African animator etc.

== See also ==
- Heaven (disambiguation)
- Heavens Above!, a 1963 black-and-white British satirical comedy
- Heavens to Betsy, a punk rock band from Olympia, Washington
