= How Jesus Became God =

Book by Bart D. Ehrman

How Jesus Became God: The Exaltation of a Jewish Preacher from Galilee
- Cover
- Author: Bart D. Ehrman
- Language: English
- Subject: Christology and the historical Jesus
- Publisher: HarperOne
- Publication date: March 25, 2014
- Media type: Print (hardback & paperback)
- Pages: 416
- ISBN: 0061778184
- Preceded by: Did Jesus Exist? (2012)
- Followed by: The Triumph of Christianity (2018)

How Jesus Became God: The Exaltation of a Jewish Preacher from Galilee is a book by American New Testament scholar Bart D. Ehrman. Published on March 25, 2014, by HarperOne, the book contends that the historical Jesus did not claim to be divine, nor was he worshipped as such during his life; rather, his status as God the Son in the Trinity in Christian doctrine developed in the years following his crucifixion.

== Overview ==
In How Jesus Became God, Ehrman argues that the historical Jesus did not claim divinity and was not worshipped as divine during his lifetime. Instead, the belief in Jesus as divine arose shortly after his crucifixion, and that the belief in Jesus as God the Son, an incarnation of God and the second divine person (or "prosopon") in the Trinity in Christian doctrine, developed in the following centuries.

Speaking to Terry Gross on the NPR radio talk show Fresh Air, Ehrman stated that, "In this book I actually do not take a stand on either the question of whether Jesus was God, or whether he was actually raised from the dead. I leave open both questions because those are theological questions based on religious beliefs and I'm writing the book as a historian."

== Reception ==
John Murawski of The Charlotte Observer wrote that the questions raised by the book may appear new and unorthodox to "the casual churchgoer, [...] but [such] disagreements were raging back in the fourth century." Murawski adds that "Ehrman's arguments are meticulously supported with citations from the Gospels and the Epistles. His critics will be quick to point out that whenever Scriptural passages contradict his thesis – such as quotes attributed to Jesus claiming 'I and the Father are one' – Ehrman simply says those passages are embellishments or fabrications. Still, I've personally yet to meet a Christian who believes that Jesus walked about Galilee declaring: 'I'm the Second Person of the Trinity!'"

Larry W. Hurtado, in his review of the book for The Christian Century, wrote that its conclusions about Jesus not claiming to be divine, as well as belief in his divinity only developing after his crucifixion, will not be novel to those familiar with New Testament scholarship and views on the historical Jesus. Hurtado wrote that "Ehrman's book is intended for readers generally unacquainted with this scholarly work," and that "Ehrman clearly seeks not simply to inform but also to stir controversy" among a readership of Christians, agnostics, and skeptics. Hurtado argues that, while "Ehrman is often good at making scholarly arguments accessible, [...] in a few matters he oversimplifies or misconstrues things, and in other cases his claims and arguments appear one-sided."

A responding book, How God Became Jesus: The Real Origins of Belief in Jesus' Divine Nature, was published simultaneously by Zondervan, a Christian imprint of HarperCollins. Ehrman published an essay in response to How God Became Jesus on his website. He stated: "their own view – that Jesus actually was God in the flesh – is not based on historical evidence but on religious beliefs and theological assumptions."

Charles Gieschen, whose work Ehrman cited, has objected to the latter's usage of his work in How Jesus Became God, instead arguing for a Christology where Jesus is identified with the God of Israel.
