= Timothy Paul Jones =

American evangelical scholar (born 1973)

- Jones in 2021
- Born: January 16, 1973 (age 53); Mansfield, Missouri, U.S.
- Education: Manhattan Christian College (BA); Midwestern Baptist Theological Seminary (MDiv); Southern Baptist Theological Seminary (PhD); Stellenbosch University (PhD)
- Occupation: Professor
- Movement: Southern Baptist Convention; evangelicalism; Calvinism
- Spouse: Rayann Jones
- Children: 4
- Theological work
- Notable ideas: ecclesial apologetics, family-equipping ministry

Timothy Paul Jones (born January 16, 1973) is an American evangelical scholar of apologetics and family ministry. He serves as the C. Edwin Gheens Professor of Christian Family Ministry at the Southern Baptist Theological Seminary. He has advocated for the contemporary retrieval of ancient models of Christian apologetics. Charles Colson identified Jones as one of the “names you need to know” when confronting the New Atheists. R. Albert Mohler described Jones as a model “of what it means to be a Christian scholar.”

== Early life and education ==
Jones was born on January 16, 1973, in Mansfield, Missouri, to the family of a rural pastor. Jones graduated from Manhattan Christian College (B.A., Biblical Studies) in 1993. He continued his studies at Midwestern Baptist Theological Seminary, earning the M.Div. in 1996. He began his doctoral studies at Southern Baptist Theological Seminary, where he received the Ed.D. before completing an academic bridge program to earn the Ph.D. Jones completed a second Ph.D. at Stellenbosch University in church history. His dissertation analyzed the surviving Greek, Armenian, and Syriac versions of the second-century Apology of Aristides, concluding that Aristides developed a distinctly ecclesial apologetic for Christianity.

Jones served churches in Missouri and Oklahoma as pastor, associate pastor, and student minister. He was appointed as a faculty member at Southern Baptist Theological Seminary in 2007. While a faculty member at Southern Seminary, Jones became a preaching pastor at Sojourn Church Midtown, the home of Sojourn Music.

== Theological and social positions ==
=== Apologetics ===
After a crisis of faith during his first year of college, Jones became interested in apologetics. His early efforts in apologetics critiqued the understanding of “faith” articulated in the works of Wilfred Cantwell Smith and James W. Fowler. Against Smith’s contention that a radical distinction may be made between “faith” and “belief,” Jones argued that early Christians did not separate form from content in their understanding of faith; according to Jones, there was not a shift from faith as personal loyalty in the early modern era, as claimed by Smith, but a reduction of faith to objective assent. In his doctoral dissertation at Southern Baptist Theological Seminary, Jones demonstrated through historical research, empirical surveys, and factor analysis that James W. Fowler’s pluralistic stages of faith do not correlate positively with evangelical Christian faith development or spiritual formation.

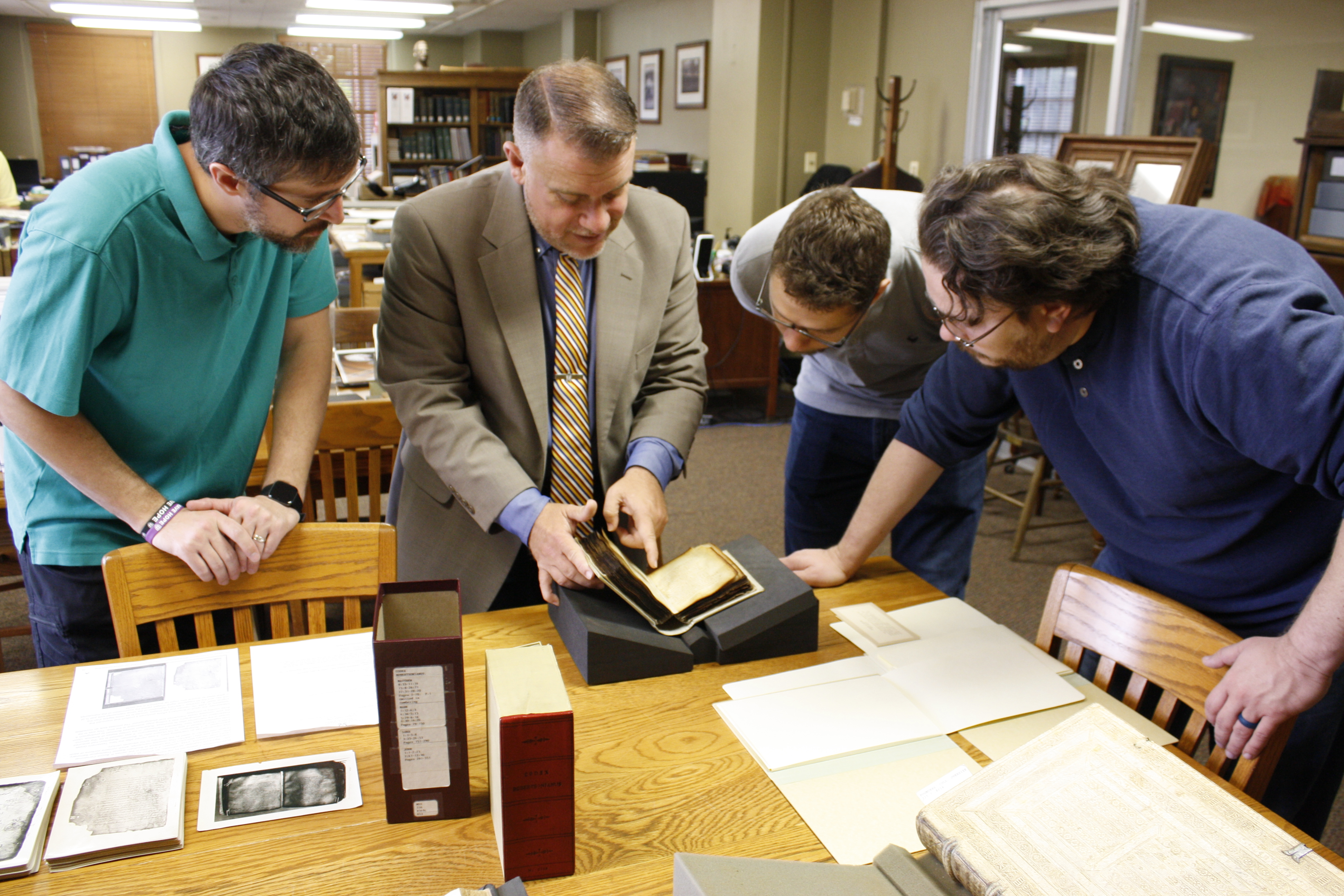
Timothy Paul Jones and doctoral students examining medieval Gospels codex GA 2358 (Codex Robertsonianus)

While completing his first Ph.D., Jones wrote two evidential apologetics texts, Misquoting Truth and Conspiracies and the Cross. Misquoting Truth was the first book-length response to Misquoting Jesus, a bestselling introduction to biblical textual criticism authored by Bart D. Ehrman. In a review of Misquoting Truth, Tim Challies stated that Jones had demonstrated that "not only are Ehrman’s arguments far from original, they are also, quite simply fallacious." Apologetics writings by Jones have frequently emphasized the historical reliability of the New Testament Gospels in contrast to later texts that were produced by sects with little interest in the actual events of Jesus’s life. When Jesus Seminar member Hal Taussig published A New New Testament, with ten texts added to the New Testament, Jones commented to Religion News Service that “treating these ten texts as historical context for the New Testament would be like studying ‘Abraham Lincoln: Vampire Hunter’ to understand the historical context of the Thirteenth Amendment,” claiming that none of the added texts could be reliably traced to eyewitnesses of Jesus’s life. Jones has been equally critical of politically conservative attempts to rework the Bible. Responding to the Conservative Bible Project, spearheaded by Andrew Schlafly and Conservapedia, Jones told the Associated Press, “This is not making scripture understandable to people today, it's reworking scripture to support a particular political or social agenda.”

Beginning with his book Why Should I Trust the Bible?, Jones's apologetics approach shifted from evidential apologetics to verificational presuppositionalism, influenced by the writings of Francis Schaeffer and Edward John Carnell. His faculty address "Brothers and Sisters, We Are All Apologists Now" revealed another dimension in his approach, in which the countercultural moral life of the church is central in the defense of the Christian faith. The Baptist Press article reporting on this address quoted Jones as stating, "Pursuing the Christian way of life will inevitably require a defense of this way of being in the world – not merely for apologists, but for all of us." This approach to apologetics, grounded in a retrieval of second-century sources, has become known as "ecclesial apologetics." According to Jones, care for the vulnerable and socially marginalized is a central component of ecclesial apologetics. Jones's coauthored book In Church as It Is in Heaven: Cultivating a Multiethnic Kingdom Culture encouraged churches to practice ecclesial apologetics through unified communities that demonstrate multiethnic, multisocioeconomic, and multigenerational diversity.

=== Family ministry ===
Despite his commitment to multigenerational churches, Jones has criticized the practice of family-integrated church in which congregations eliminate all age-organized ministries. His academic paper “Catechism Classes and Other Surprising Precedents for Age-Organized Ministry” examined sixteenth-century practices of age-organized discipleship and pointed out errors in the historical claims made by proponents of family-integrated ministry. Jones pioneered a model of family ministry known as “family-equipping ministry,” which prioritizes family discipleship while maintaining age-organized programs. This model is described in detail in his books Perspectives on Family Ministry and Family Ministry Field Guide. In an article in Christianity Today, Jones emphasized the church's responsibility to function as a family for single-parent households, commenting that, “in the New Testament, the people of God are formed into a new, covenant family, adopted from every tribe and language and people group. This doesn’t do away with the family formed in the covenant between a man and woman, but it re-situates it in the context of a greater family, where we’re called to become a family for one another."

=== Sex and gender roles ===
Jones holds to traditional Christian teachings regarding gender and sexuality. He was an early signatory of the Nashville Statement, which declares that a “homosexual or transgender self-conception” is inconsistent “with God’s holy purposes.” Beth Allison Barr criticized Jones on her blog and in her book The Making of Biblical Womanhood because Jones depicted the medieval abbess Hildegard of Bingen as proclaiming the truth but omitted any explicit reference to Hildegard as a preacher in his book Christian History Made Easy.

== Recognition ==
Timothy Paul Jones’s books have received numerous accolades. Christian History Made Easy won the 2010 Christian Retailers’ Choice Award in the Christian Education category. The Evangelical Christian Publishers Association awarded Jones a Christian Book Award in the Bible Reference category in 2016 for his book How We Got the Bible. Jones and his coauthor Jamaal E. Williams received a 2024 Award of Merit from Christianity Today for In Church as It Is in Heaven. Publishers Weekly featured In Church as It Is in Heaven as a work that faces "the challenge of creating multiethnic congregations."

In 2025, Jones was selected as a fellow of The Keller Center for Cultural Apologetics, a center for Christian cultural engagement founded by The Gospel Coalition in honor of Timothy Keller. He is also a member of the Evangelical Theological Society, and he has regularly presented papers at annual meetings.

== Personal life ==
Jones is married to Rayann, and they have adopted four children. Their oldest daughter was an early survivor of severe COVID-19. She spent nearly a month in the hospital and eleven days on a ventilator before recovering and being released.

== Selected bibliography ==
=== Books authored or coauthored ===
- With James L. Garlow and April Williams. The Da Vinci Codebreaker: An Easy-to-Use Fact Checker for Truth Seekers. Bethany House, 2006. ISBN 978-0764201851
- Misquoting Truth: A Guide to the Fallacies of Bart Ehrman’s “Misquoting Jesus”. IVP, 2007. ISBN 978-0830834471
- Christian History Made Easy. Rose Bible Basics. Rose Publishing, 2009. ISBN 978-1596363281
- Family Ministry Field Guide: How Your Church Can Equip Parents to Make Disciples. Wesleyan Publishing House, 2011. ISBN 978-0898274578
- PROOF: Finding Freedom through the Intoxicating Joy of Irresistible Grace. Zondervan, 2014. ISBN 978-0310513896
- How We Got the Bible. Rose Publishing, 2015. ISBN 978-1628622164
- With Michael S. Wilder. The God Who Goes before You: Pastoral Leadership as Christ-Centered Followership. B&H Publishing Group, 2018. ISBN 978-1433671135
- Why Should I Trust the Bible?. The Big Ten. Christian Focus, 2020. ISBN 978-1527104747
- With Jamaal E. Williams. In Church as It Is in Heaven: Cultivating a Multiethnic Kingdom Culture. IVP, 2023. ISBN 978-1514005385
- Did the Resurrection Really Happen?. TGC Hard Questions. Crossway, 2025. ISBN 978-1433598555

=== Books edited ===
- Perspectives on Your Child's Education: Four Views. B&H Academic, 2009. ISBN 978-0805448443
- Perspectives on Family Ministry: Three Views. B&H Academic, 2019. ISBN 978-1535933360
- Understanding Christian Apologetics: Five Methods for Defending the Faith. Hendrickson Publishers, 2025. ISBN 978-1496488138

=== Chapters contributed ===
- With Michael S. Wilder. Faith development and Christian formation. In Christian Formation: Integrating Theology and Human Development. Edited by James R. Estep and Jonathan H. Kim. B&H Academic, 2010. ISBN 978-0805448382
- Family ministry models. In A Theology for Family Ministries. Edited by Michael and Michelle Anthony. B&H Academic, 2011. ISBN 978-0805464214
- Family life curriculum. In Mapping Out Curriculum in Your Church: Cartography for Christian Pilgrims. Edited by James R. Estep, Roger White, and Karen Estep. B&H Academic, 2012. ISBN 978-1433672385
- Past patterns and present challenges in online theological education. In Teaching the World: Foundations for Online Theological Education. B&H Academic, 2017. ISBN 978-1433691591
- Catechism classes and other surprising precedents for age-organized ministries. In Navigating Student Ministry: Charting Your Course for the Journey. Edited by Timothy McKnight. B&H Academic, 2022. ISBN 978-1462773367
- Family-as-church, church-as-family: Towards a more comprehensive definition of family ministry. In Australian Evangelical Perspectives on Youth Ministry: Identity, Church, Culture, and Discipleship. Australian College of Theology Monograph Series. Edited by Ruth Lukabyo. Wipf and Stock Publishers, 2023. ISBN 979-8385203840
- ”Something divine mingled among them”: Care for the parentless and the poor as ecclesial apologetic in the second century. In Rich in Good Deeds: A Biblical Response to Poverty by the Church and by Society. Faith and Work Project. Edited by Robert L. Plummer. Fontes Press, 2022. ISBN 978-1948048736

=== Peer-reviewed articles authored ===
- John Calvin and the problem of philosophical apologetics. In Perspectives on Religious Studies 23 (1996): 387–403. https://ixtheo.de/Record/1636665152
- The basis of James W. Fowler’s understanding of faith in the research of Wilfred Cantwell Smith. In Religious Education 99 (2004): 345–357. https://doi.org/10.1080/00344080490513171
- The necessity of objective assent in the act of the Christian faith. In Bibliotheca Sacra 162 (2005): 150–157. https://ixtheo.de/Record/1644799022
- Prophets, priests, and kings today? Theological and practical problems with the use of the munus triplex as a leadership typology. In Perichoresis 16 (2018): 63–85. https://doi.org/10.2478/perc-2018-0017
- Family-as-church, church-as-family: Toward a more comprehensive definition of family ministry. In D6 Family Ministry Journal 4 (2019): 3–25. https://store.d6family.com/products/d6-family-ministry-journal-vol-4
- For the civic good, against the civic gods: Cultural catechesis in Aristides. In Faith and Flourishing 4 (2025). https://karamfellowship.org/ff-archive/
