= Heavenly =

Heavenly may refer to:

- Pertaining to Heaven

== Music ==
=== Bands ===
- Heavenly (British band), an English pop band
- Heavenly (French band), a French heavy metal band

=== Albums ===
- Heavenly (Johnny Mathis album), 1959
- Heavenly (L'Arc-en-Ciel album), 1995
- Heavenly, a 1997 album by Ladysmith Black Mambazo

=== Songs ===
- "Heavenly", a song by Cigarettes After Sex from the 2019 album Cry
- "Heavenly", a song by The Dandy Warhols from the 2003 album Welcome to the Monkey House
- "Heavenly", a song by Pale Waves from the 2018 EP All the Things I Never Said
- "Heavenly", a song by The Temptations from the 1973 album 1990

== Other uses ==
- Heavenly Planet, a proposed world music festival in Reading, England
- Heavenly Recordings, a British independent record label
- Heavenly Mountain Resort, a ski resort located on the California–Nevada border near Lake Tahoe
- Heavenly Hiraani Tiger Lily Hutchence-Geldof (born 1996), English-Australian singer-songwriter

== See also ==
- Heaven (disambiguation)
