= Thorpe St Andrew School =

Secondary school on the outskirts of Norwich, England

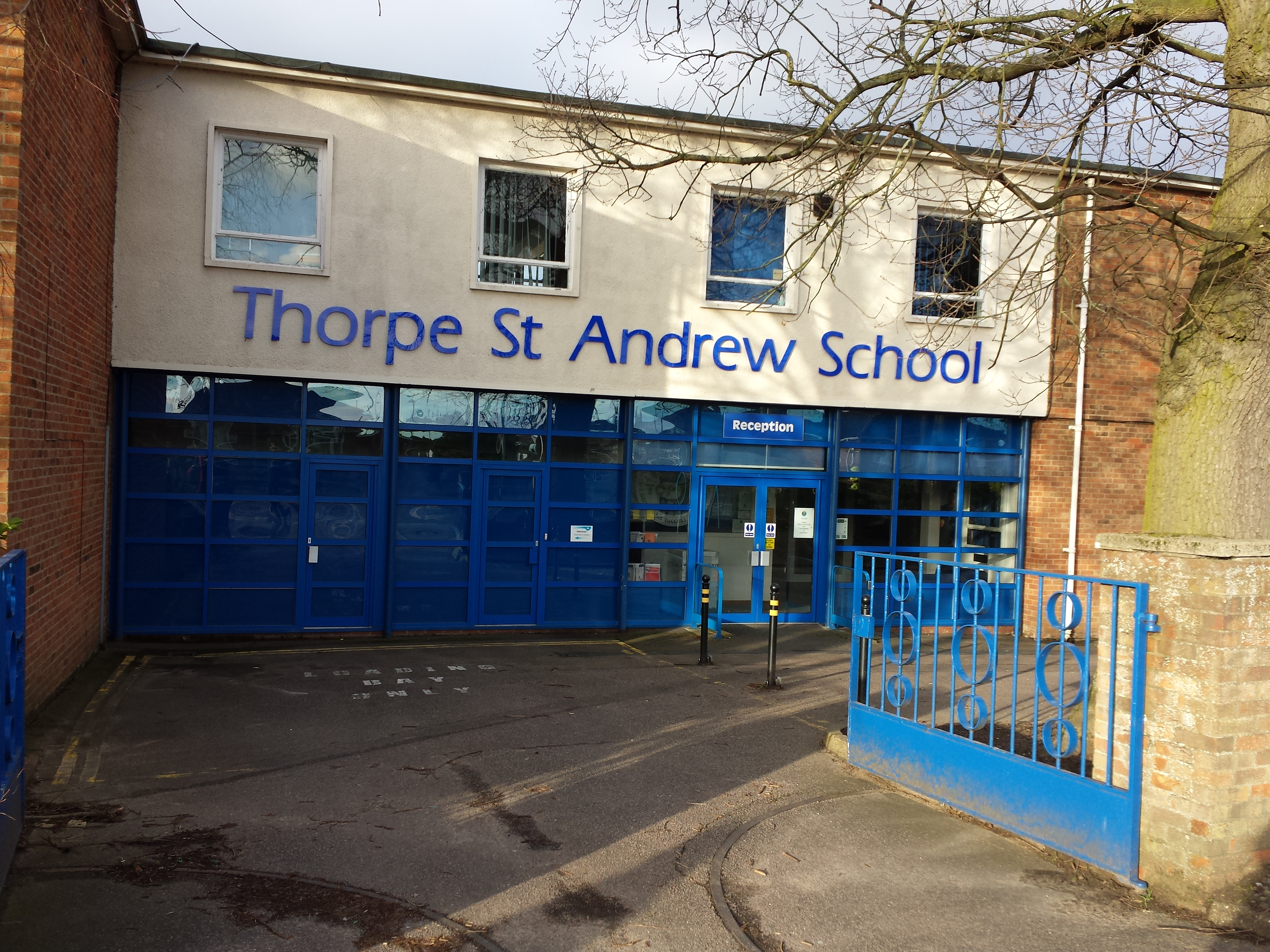
- Thorpe St Andrew School

Location
- Laundry Lane, Thorpe St Andrew; Norwich, Norfolk, NR7 0XS; England; 52.6361°N 1.3559°E

Information
- Type: Academy
- Trust: Broad Horizons Education Trust
- Department for Education URN: 143278 Tables
- Ofsted: Reports
- Head teacher: Penny Bignell
- Gender: Mixed
- Age: 11 to 18
- Enrolment: 1877
- Colours: Navy blue and white
- Website: http://www.thorpe-st-andrewhigh.co.uk/

Thorpe St Andrew School is an 11-to-18 mixed secondary school in Thorpe St Andrew, on the outskirts of the city of Norwich in the English county of Norfolk.

== Description ==
In the 2014 inspection, Ofsted described the school:

The school is larger than the average secondary school and serves the eastern side of Norwich and the adjacent rural communities.

- The school operates on a splitsite and is housed mainly in post-war buildings which have been refurbished. There are a number of recently constructed buildings for performing arts, business and technology.The school has extensive grounds and playing fields.
- Most pupils are from White British backgrounds, with a very small number from minority ethnic backgrounds.
- A below-average proportion of students are supported by the pupil premium, which provides additional funding for students who are in local authority care, from armed services families or known to be eligible for free school meals.
- The proportions of disabled students and those who have special educational needs supported through school action is broadly average. The proportion supported at school action plus or with a statement of special educational needs is well below average.
- The school meets the government’s current floor standards, which set the minimum expectations for students’ attainment and progress.
- A small number of Key Stage 4 students take work-related courses at the City College and other training providers.
- The school has a large sixth form which increasingly recruits a growing number of students from other schools.

== Results ==
In 2008, Ofsted reported that Year 11 pupils were at a higher level than expected. They also said that the pupils were welcoming and polite.

In early 2012 Thorpe St Andrew scored well in the Department for Education school league tables. For 2011, 69% of students achieved 5 or more A*-C grades at GCSE (or equivalent) including English and Mathematics, slightly lower than in 2010 (71%) but higher than both 2009 (67%) and 2008 (64%). The percentage of students who achieved 5 or more A*-C grades at GCSE (or equivalent) was 91%, and 99% of pupils achieved at least one qualification. In the 2014 inspection, Ofsted described the school as outstanding. In the 2022 Ofsted inspection, the rating dropped to "requires improvement". The sixth form was described as good. In the 2025 Ofsted inspection, the rating was raised to Good in all areas.

== Stabbing ==
Thorpe St. Andrew school stabbing
- Location: Thorpe St. Andrew school
- Date: 11 March 2026
- Attack type: School attack; Stabbing; Attempted mass murder
- Weapon: kitchen knife
- Deaths: 0
- Injuries: 1
- Perpetrator: 15-year-old male
- Motive: Misanthropy; Misogyny; Suicidal ideation
- Charges: Attempted murder Possession of a bladed article

At approximately 10:20 a.m. on 11 March 2026 a 15-year-old pupil at the school stabbed a fellow 15-year-old female at the school, causing minor injuries. After the injured student alerted a teacher, the boy was chased out of the building. The school was placed into lockdown as armed police arrived. The lockdown was lifted at 2:00 p.m.

After leaving the site, the perpetrator messaged his mother to inform her of his actions, who, after tracing his location using his mobile phone, called 999. The perpetrator was arrested shortly after this for grevious bodily harm. Police also recovered a kitchen knife nearby that had been missing from the family home since November 2025.

The subsequent investigation found the 15-year-old perpetrator had an interest in serial killers, mass murderers, and incel subculture. Notebook entries made it clear that the perpetrator had intended to carry out a large scale attack with several casualties. The day prior to the stabbing, he had researched school shootings and Elliot Rodger. Whilst the perpetrator had pleaded guilty to wounding with intent, prosecutors proceeded with a charge of attempted murder, which he was found guilty of on 22 October 2026.

== Notable former pupils ==
- Ben Bradshaw, politician
- Sam Clemmett, actor
- Jacyn Heavens, CEO and founder of Epos Now
- Neil Innes, writer, comedian and musician
- Olly Stone, cricketer
- Nick Holywell-Walker, Musician, TV Composer, Keyboard player with UK post-punk band Killing Joke
