= Heaven and Hell =

Heaven and Hell may refer to:

- Heaven and Hell

== Literature ==
- Heaven and Hell (Swedenborg book), a 1758 book by Emanuel Swedenborg
- Heaven and Hell (Kardec book), an 1865 book by Allan Kardec
- Heaven and Hell (essay), a 1956 book by Aldous Huxley, sequel to The Doors of Perception
- Heaven and Hell (Jakes novel), a 1987 novel by John Jakes in the North and South trilogy
- Heaven and Hell, a 1981 play by Dusty Hughes
- Heaven and Hell (Icelandic: Himnaríki og helvíti), a 2007 novel by Jón Kalman Stefánsson
- Heaven and Hell: My Life in the Eagles (1974–2001), a 2008 autobiography by Don Felder
- Heaven and Hell: A History of the Afterlife, a 2020 book by Bart D. Ehrman

== Music ==
- Heaven & Hell (band), a band with members of Black Sabbath

=== Albums ===
- Heaven & Hell (Ava Max album)
- Heaven and Hell (Black Sabbath album), or the title song (see below)
- Heaven & Hell (Devolo album), or the title song
- Heaven & Hell (Joe Jackson album)
- Heaven & Hell (Meat Loaf and Bonnie Tyler album)
- Heaven & Hell (Shin Terai album)
- Heaven and Hell (Systems in Blue album), or the title song (see below)
- Heaven and Hell (Vangelis album), or the title song
- Heaven :x: Hell, a 2024 album by Sum 41
- Heaven & Hell – A Tribute to The Velvet Underground, a series of albums
- Side A of the No Name LP by Jack White

=== Songs ===
- "Heaven and Hell" (Easybeats song), 1967
- "Heaven and Hell" (Black Sabbath song), 1980
- "Heaven 'n Hell", a 1994 song by Salt-n-Pepa
- "Heaven and Hell" (Systems in Blue song), 2009
- "Heaven and Hell" (The Who song), 1970, also recorded by John Entwistle
- "Heaven and Hell", a song by Flower Travellin' Band from Made in Japan, 1972
- "Heaven and Hell", a song by C. C. Catch from Welcome to the Heartbreak Hotel, 1986
- "Heaven & Hell", a song by Circus of Power from Magic & Madness, 1992
- "Heaven & Hell" (Raekwon song), 1994
- "Heaven and Hell", a song by Annie from Don't Stop, 2009
- "Heaven and Hell", a song by Wisdom from Judas, 2011
- "Heaven and Hell", a song by Kanye West from Donda, 2021

== Film and television ==
- High and Low (1963 film) (Tengoku to Jigoku, literally Heaven and Hell), a 1963 movie by Akira Kurosawa
- Heaven and Hell, a 1980 Hong Kong film produced by Shaw Brothers Studio
- "Heaven and Hell" (Cosmos: A Personal Voyage), an episode of Cosmos: A Personal Voyage
- "Heaven and Hell", an episode of Decoding the Past
- "Heaven and Hell", an episode of Mysteries of the Bible
- "Heaven and Hell" (Supernatural), an episode of the television series Supernatural
- Jeremy Clarkson: Heaven and Hell, a 2005 DVD by Jeremy Clarkson
- Heaven And Hell: North And South Book III, a 1994 television miniseries in the North and South TV miniseries trilogy

== Video games ==
- Heaven and Hell (video game), a turn-based strategy video game

== See also ==
- The Marriage of Heaven and Hell, an 18th-century book by William Blake
- Heaven or Hell (disambiguation)
- Heaven (disambiguation)
- Hell (disambiguation)
