= Heaven or Hell =

Heaven or Hell may refer to:

- Heaven or Hell (album), 2020 album by Don Toliver
- Heaven or Hell, an album by David and the Giants
- "Heaven or Hell", a song by Gamma Ray from the 2001 album No World Order
- "Heaven or Hell", a song by the Stranglers from the 1992 album Stranglers in the Night
- "Heaven or Hell", a song by Jacky Vincent from the 2013 album Star X Speed Story

== See also ==
- Heaven and Hell (disambiguation)
- "Heaven nor Hell", a 2010 song by Volbeat
