= Jesus: Apocalyptic Prophet of the New Millennium =

1999 book by Bart D. Ehrman

- First edition
- Author: Bart D. Ehrman
- Language: English
- Subjects: Christian history Biblical criticism
- Publisher: Oxford University Press
- Publication date: 1999 books
- Publication place: United States
- Media type: Print (hardback)
- Pages: 368
- ISBN: 978-0195124743

Jesus: Apocalyptic Prophet of the New Millennium is a 1999 book by New Testament scholar Bart D. Ehrman. In it, he argues that Jesus of Nazareth was an apocalyptic preacher, i.e., his main message was that the end of history was near, that God would shortly intervene to overthrow evil and establish his rule on earth, and that Jesus and his disciples all believed these end time events would occur in their lifetimes. Ehrman also analyzes New Testament passages such as Jesus' birth in Bethlehem of a virgin and finds them not historically accurate.

== Reviews ==
The book received positive reviews by other scholars on the historical Jesus and early Christianity: Paula Fredriksen described the book as "an excellent introduction to this often elusive figure, the Jesus of history", while Catholic New Testament scholar John P. Meier stated that the book is "a healthy and needed correction to the portrait of Jesus common in many American academic circles today, influenced as they are by the Jesus Seminar".

Kirkus Reviews called Ehrman's work "an elegantly written, much-needed book", while Publishers Weekly called it "the single best introduction to the study of the historical Jesus".
