= Mobius Band (band) =

American electronic rock trio

Mobius Band was an electronic rock trio from Brooklyn, New York consisting of Noam Schatz (drums), Peter Sax (bass/vocals/keyboards), and Ben Sterling (guitar/vocals/keyboards).

== History ==
The band began when members Schatz, Sterling and Sax met as students at Wesleyan University. After graduation, they moved to Shutesbury, Massachusetts to hone their sound. Following the self-produced, self-released (on their own Prescription Rails label) and mostly instrumental EPs One, Two, and Three, Mobius Band were signed to Ann Arbor, Michigan's Ghostly International in 2004, becoming the electronic label's first rock-based act.

Their first Ghostly release was the City Vs. Country EP in March 2005, which earned critical acclaim for its fusion of pop songs with electronic flourishes, paralleling the work of contemporaries like The Notwist and The Postal Service. The first Mobius Band full-length album is August 2005's The Loving Sounds of Static, which took the ideas of City Vs. Country further, adding a lyrical focus on coming of age and disillusionment with modern America.

Mobius Band's second full-length album, Heaven, was released on October 2, 2007, by Misra Records and Ghostly International. Following the album's release, the band toured extensively around the US, Canada, England and Europe with Editors, Tokyo Police Club, Black Kids, Cut Copy, Matthew Dear and Tigercity. Previously the band has toured with The National, Baby Dayliner, and The Walkmen.

On Valentine's Day 2008, the band released a free online covers EP of love songs called "LOVE WILL REIGN SUPREME."

The band followed the EP with 2009's Valentine's Day EP, "EMPIRE OF LOVE," released for free on February 13, 2009, featuring covers of Kanye West, the Dixie Chicks, and Tom Petty.

== Discography ==
=== Albums ===
- 2005: The Loving Sounds of Static (Ghostly)
- 2007: Heaven (Misra)

=== EPs ===
- 2001: One (Self-released)
- 2001: Two (Self-released)
- 2002: Three (Self-released)
- 2005: City Vs Country (Ghostly)
- 2008: LOVE WILL REIGN SUPREME (self-released, free covers EP)
- 2009: EMPIRE OF LOVE (self-released, free covers EP)
