= Forgery and Counterforgery =

Scholarly monograph on literary forgery in early Christianity

- Cover
- Author: Bart D. Ehrman
- Language: English
- Subject: Early Christian literature, pseudepigraphy, textual criticism
- Genre: Nonfiction
- Publisher: Oxford University Press
- Publication date: November 2012
- Publication place: United States
- Media type: Print, e-book
- Pages: 628
- ISBN: 978-0-19-992803-3
- OCLC: 825060076
- Preceded by: The Apocryphal Gospels: Texts and Translations (2011)
- Followed by: Did Jesus Exist? (2012)

Forgery and Counterforgery: The Use of Literary Deceit in Early Christian Polemics is a 2012 scholarly monograph by American New Testament historian Bart D. Ehrman. It was published by Oxford University Press.

== Reception ==
The scholar David Brakke called Forgery and Counterforgery a "magisterial book [that] will stimulate new conversations about the early Christian practice of pseudonymous writing". Tony Burke, a professor at York University, found the book to be "a weighty tome" that would have been "far more accessible without the degree of background detail provided on each of the texts in the study".
