= Steve Brown (author) =

American Christian author, radio broadcaster, and a seminary professor

- Born: Stephen Webb Brown; Asheville, North Carolina, U.S.
- Occupations: radio host, bible teacher, radio personality, author
- Years active: 1985–present
- Spouse: Anna Williamson
- Children: 2

Steve Brown is an American Christian author, a radio broadcaster, and a former seminary professor at Reformed Theological Seminary in Orlando, Florida. He describes himself as a Calvinist, and is ordained in the Presbyterian Church in America.

== Biography ==
Steve was born near Asheville, North Carolina, and was raised a Methodist. He attended High Point College, where he earned a BA in philosophy, and Boston University, where he earned the Bachelor of Sacred Theology. After pastoring a church on Cape Cod, he assumed the role of senior pastor at First United Presbyterian Church in Quincy, Massachusetts. He pastored there, wrote his first book, and hosted the "Sounds of Praise" radio ministry until 1974, when he moved to Key Biscayne Presbyterian Church. In Key Biscayne, Florida, he pastored for seventeen years and started Key Life Network. After he had written several books, King College awarded him a Litt.D. During this time he was part of a television show called Hashing It Out, where he and his friend Tony Campolo would debate current events and theological issues. He is a teetotaller.

Upon stepping down from the pulpit, Brown accepted a position at Reformed Theological Seminary in Orlando, Florida, to become professor of communication and practical theology/homiletics until his retirement. Brown hosts Steve Brown Etc., a weekend Christian talk show on the Salem Radio Network. He is a frequent speaker and guest lecturer.

In November 2009, Brown, along with several dozen other prominent Christian leaders in the U.S., signed an ecumenical statement known as the Manhattan Declaration, calling on evangelicals, Catholics, and Orthodox Christians not to comply with rules and laws permitting abortion, same-sex marriage, and other matters that go against their religious consciences.

== Books ==
- Born Free
- What Was I Thinking?: Things I've Learned Since I Knew It All
- A Scandalous Freedom: The Radical Nature of the Gospel
- If God is In Charge
- When Your Rope Breaks
- When Being Good is Not Good Enough
- No More Mr. Nice Guy
- How To Talk So People Will Listen
- Three Free Sins: God's Not Mad At You
- Living Free
- Approaching God
- Hidden Agendas
- Talk the Walk
- Laughter and Lament
- God's Not Mad At You: Confronting the Lies of Guilt, Shame, Fear, and Regret
