= Heaven and Hell: A History of the Afterlife =

Book by Bart D. Ehrman

- First edition cover
- Author: Bart D. Ehrman
- Language: English
- Subject: Historical development of the concepts of Heaven, Hell, and the afterlife
- Publisher: Simon & Schuster
- Publication date: 2020
- Media type: Print (hardback & paperback)
- Pages: 352
- ISBN: 978-1501136733
- Preceded by: The Triumph of Christianity

Heaven and Hell: A History of the Afterlife is a book by American New Testament scholar Bart D. Ehrman. Published in 2020 by Simon & Schuster, the book examines the historical development of the concepts of the afterlife in Greek, Jewish, and early Christian cultures, and how they eventually converged into the modern Christian concepts of Heaven and Hell.

== Overview ==
Heaven and Hell: A History of the Afterlife explores the development of the concepts of the afterlife, from ideas in Greek, Jewish, and early Christian cultures to modern Christian conceptions of Heaven and Hell. The book examines the influence of ancient Greek philosopher Plato, Greek poet Homer, Roman poet Virgil, Syrian satirist Lucian of Samosata, early Christians, and others on the evolution of the concepts and imagery associated with Heaven and Hell in modern Christianity.

== Reception ==
A reviewer for The New Yorker wrote of Heaven and Hell: "This elegant history explores the evolution of the concept of the afterlife in Western thought. [...] Well-trod subjects are presented with engaging clarity, and more contentious theories are laid out carefully." Joel Looper of the Washington Independent Review of Books called the book "a tour de force: erudite, provocative, and often fun."

The Jerusalem Post's Randy Rosenthal lamented that Ehrman "completely neglects the Koran and Eastern religions, which is unfortunate, not to mention negligent", but found the exploration of the influence of figures like Homer, Plato, and Virgil on modern understanding of the afterlife to be interesting.
