= Heaven on Earth =

Heaven on Earth is a phrase referring to the idyllic world to come in many religions and mythologies.

Heaven on Earth may also refer to:

== Film, television and theatre ==
- Heaven on Earth (1927 American film), a film starring Conrad Nagel
- Heaven on Earth (1927 German film), a comedy film directed by Alfred Schirokauer and Reinhold Schünzel
- Heaven on Earth (1931 film), a film based on the 1929 novel Mississippi by Ben Lucien Burman
- Heaven on Earth (1935 film), an Austrian film
- Heaven on Earth (musical), a 1948 Broadway musical by Jay Gorney
- Heaven on Earth (1960 film), an Italian film of 1960
- Heaven on Earth (1987 film), a UK TV drama written by Margaret Atwood
- Heaven on Earth (play), a 1989 play by Robert Schenkkan
- Heaven on Earth: The Rise and Fall of Socialism, a 2005 PBS documentary
- Heaven on Earth (2008 film), a 2008 Canadian film by Deepa Mehta

== Music ==
- Heaven on Earth (Belinda Carlisle album), 1987
  - "Heaven Is a Place on Earth", a 1987 single from the aforementioned album
- Heaven on Earth (James Carter album), 2009
- Heaven on Earth (Larry Young album), 1968
- Heaven on Earth, an album by Donna Allen, 1988
  - "Heaven on Earth", the album's title track
- "Heaven on Earth", a song by Britney Spears from Blackout, 2007
- "Heaven on Earth", a song by Fat White Family from Champagne Holocaust
- "Heaven on Earth", a song by George and Ira Gershwin from the stage musical Oh, Kay!, 1926
- "Heaven on Earth", a song by Keith LeBlanc from Major Malfunction, 1986
- "Heaven on Earth", a song by The Platters, 1956
- "Heaven on Earth", a song by Stars Go Dim, 2018
- "Heaven on Earth (The Things We've Got to Do)", a song by Alphaville from Catching Rays on Giant, 2010
- "H.O.E. (Heaven on Earth)", a song by Yo Gotti from Untrapped, 2020
- "Hvn on Earth", a song by Lil Tecca and Kodak Black, 2023

== Literature ==
- Heaven on Earth: A Treatise on Christian Assurance, a 1654 book by Thomas Brooks
- Heaven on Earth: Dispatches From America's Spiritual Frontier, a 1992 book by Michael D'Antonio
- Heaven on Earth: The Varieties of the Millennial Experience, a 2011 book by Richard Landes
- Heaven on Earth: A Journey Through Shari'a Law, a 2012 book by Sadakat Kadri

== Other ==
- Heaven on Earth (workshop), a religious art workshop in Ukraine
- Heaven on Earth: Art from Islamic Lands, a 2004 exhibition of Islamic Art in London
- Maharishi Heaven on Earth Development, a for-profit real estate developer founded in 1988
- Heaven on Earth, a nickname for the U.S. state of North Dakota
