= Heaven (Mobius Band album) =

Studio album by Mobius Band
- Released: 2007
- Recorded: 2007
- Genre: Indie rock
- Length: 42:02
- Label: Misra Records
- Producer: Mobius Band

Mobius Band chronology
The Loving Sounds of Static (2005)	Heaven (2007)

Heaven is the second full-length record by Mobius Band. It was released in 2007.

== Critical reception ==
Professional ratings
Review scores
Source	Rating
Pitchfork	4.2/10
AllMusic	3.5/5

== Track listing ==
1. "Hallie"– 4:27
2. "Secret Language" – 3:51
3. "A Hint Of Blood" – 3:36
4. "Leave The Keys In The Door" – 4:05
5. "Friends Like These" – 4:14
6. "Control" – 4:39
7. "Tie A Tie" – 4:03
8. "Under Sand" – 3:51
9. "Black Spot" – 4:49
10. "I Am Always Waiting" – 4:24
