= Evidential apologetics =

School of Christian apologetics

Evidential apologetics or evidentialism is an approach to Christian apologetics emphasizing the use of evidence to demonstrate that God exists. The evidence is supposed to be evidence both the believer and nonbeliever share, that is to say one need not presuppose God's existence. Evidential apologetics is not necessarily evidentialism, however many associate them as the same. Evidential apologetics method looks at the New Testament's historical documents first, then upon to Jesus' miracles in particular the resurrection which evidentialists believe points to Jesus Christ as the Son of God. Some of the top supporters of this method include Gary Habermas, John Warwick Montgomery, Clark Pinnock, and Wolfhart Pannenberg.

== See also ==
- Christian Apologetics and Research Ministry
- Evidentialism
- Presuppositional apologetics
