= Heavenly Planet =

- The Heavenly Planet "Dove" logo
- Genre: World music
- Dates: 10–12 July
- Locations: Little John's Farm; Reading, United Kingdom
- Years active: 2009 (cancelled)
- Founders: Reading Borough Council
- Website: http://www.heavenlyplanet.co.uk/

Heavenly Planet was a planned music festival in Reading, Berkshire, England. The festival was expected to have a capacity of 15,000 and have at least three stages — two all-weather outdoor stages and potentially one indoor arena within the adjacent Rivermead Leisure Centre.

On 17 March 2009, Live Nation and Festival Republic issued a press release announcing the cancellation of the festival "due to the effect of the current economic climate".

== History ==
Since the WOMAD festival ceased to operate in Reading in 2006, Heavenly Planet was scheduled to take place on the same site as both WOMAD and the Reading Festival. Situated 2 miles (3.2 km) north-west of the town centre, the Little John's Farm site (near Caversham Bridge) was developed by Reading Festival organiser Melvin Benn, WOMAD's former artistic director Thomas Brooman CBE and Reading Borough Council.

=== 2009 event ===
Planned artists for the 2009 event included The Wonderstuff, the Ukulele Orchestra of Great Britain and the Royal Drummers of Burundi.
