= Heaven Tanudiredja =

Indonesian fashion designer

Heaven Tanudiredja (born 1982) is an Indonesian fashion designer living and working in Antwerp, Belgium. He is noted for his sculptural accessories, yet he trained in womenswear not accessory design from the prestigious Royal Academy of Fine Arts.

== Career ==
Before launching his namesake label in 2007, Tanudiredja worked in the studios of Christian Dior Haute Couture and Dries Van Noten, after serving as a stagier to John Galliano in his Paris atelier. In 2018 he launched his womenswear collection during AW Tokyo Fashion Week.

== Design Partnerships ==
At sixteen he was Biyan Wanaatmadja's design assistant. Beyond showing his collection of handmade pieces, Tanudiredja collaborates with many innovative designers such as: British designer John Galliano for Christian Dior Haute Couture, Korean designer Juun J., Dutch designer Iris Van Herpen and Belgian designer Dries Van Noten - where he contributes custom neck pieces and sculptural clutches to their Paris runway shows. Additionally, a one-of-a-kind large scale sculpture was sold at auction for Pierre Bergé & Associés.

In 2013, the designer collaborated with Bruno Pieters' revolutionary company entitled Honest by. Heaven Tanudiredja. Honest by which focuses on production transparency and sustainability co-launched the six piece capsule, a campaign was shot by Pieters showcasing three of fashions most recognizable faces; Shala Monroque, Michele Violy Harper and Paula Goldstein - Vogue, a product of American Vogue, made the announcement.

== Honours ==
- 2019, Big Design Awards [Japan] Creative Prize, awarded by Takashi ikegami, is a professor in the Department of General Systems Sciences at the University of Tokyo
- 2013, Vogue [Italia] Talents Corner, Italy
- 2010, Vogue [Italia] Talents Who's on Next?, Italy
- 2007, ITS Vertice Award, Italy
- 2006, Christine Mathys Award, Belgium
