= Heaven Rubber Bandit =

1990s United States rubber-powered aircraft

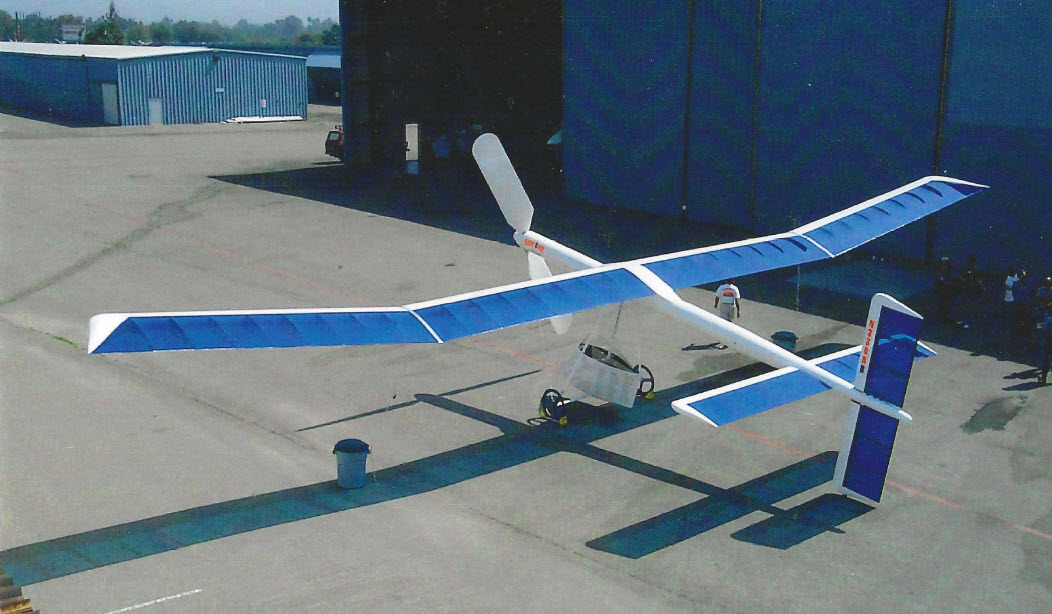
- First rollout of the Rubber Bandit

General information
- Type: Experimental aircraft
- National origin: United States
- Manufacturer: George Heaven
- Number built: 1

The Rubber Bandit was an experimental aircraft, designed and built in the 1990s by George Heaven, of Van Nuys, California, which was powered by a rubber-band motor.

== Development ==
George Heaven was a pilot and aeronautical engineer who wanted to make the first flight in a rubber powered airplane. Development work included the building and testing of a 1/25th scale free flight model, which had a 27 in (69 cm) wingspan. This was followed by building and testing of a 1/4 scale rubber powered, radio-controlled model, which had a 17 ft (5.2 m) wingspan. The latter craft was said to be the largest rubber-powered airplane to have taken off and flown under its own power.

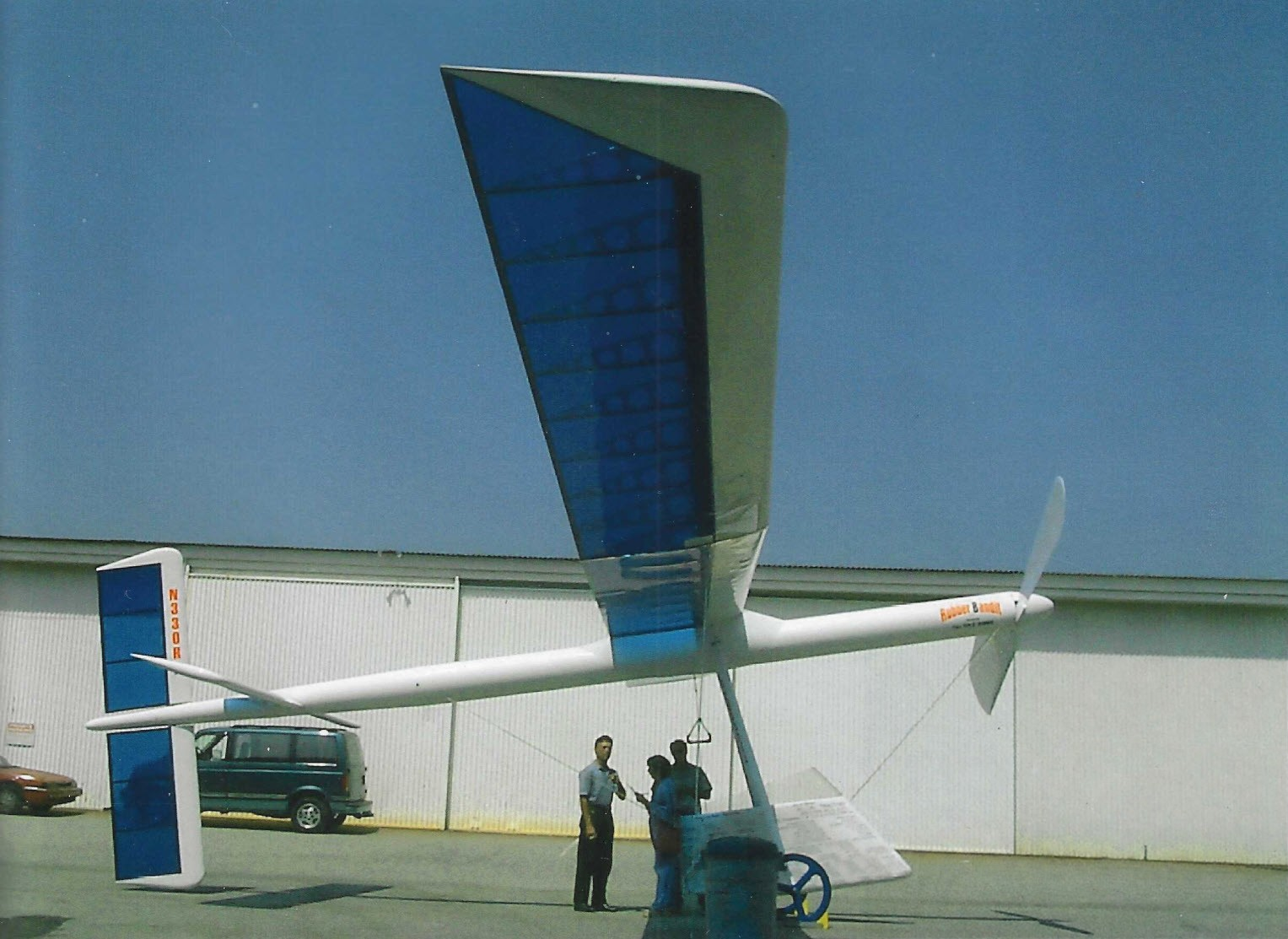
Side view of Rubber Bandit.

The full-sized craft, dubbed the Rubber Bandit, was of conventional configuration. It was a high-wing monoplane, fitted with a tractor propeller. The craft's primary structure was made of carbon-fiber and Kevlar tubing, with the wings and tail surfaces being built from carbon-fiber ribs, and covered in blue Mylar film. The wing was of constant chord, with the outer panels set at a slight dihedral. There were no ailerons, with all control being via the tail surfaces, which were operated by remote control servos. The fuselage consisted of a single tube, within which the rubber-motor was contained. A small nacelle, located under the fuselage and below the wing, accommodated the pilot and a passenger.

== Rubber motor ==
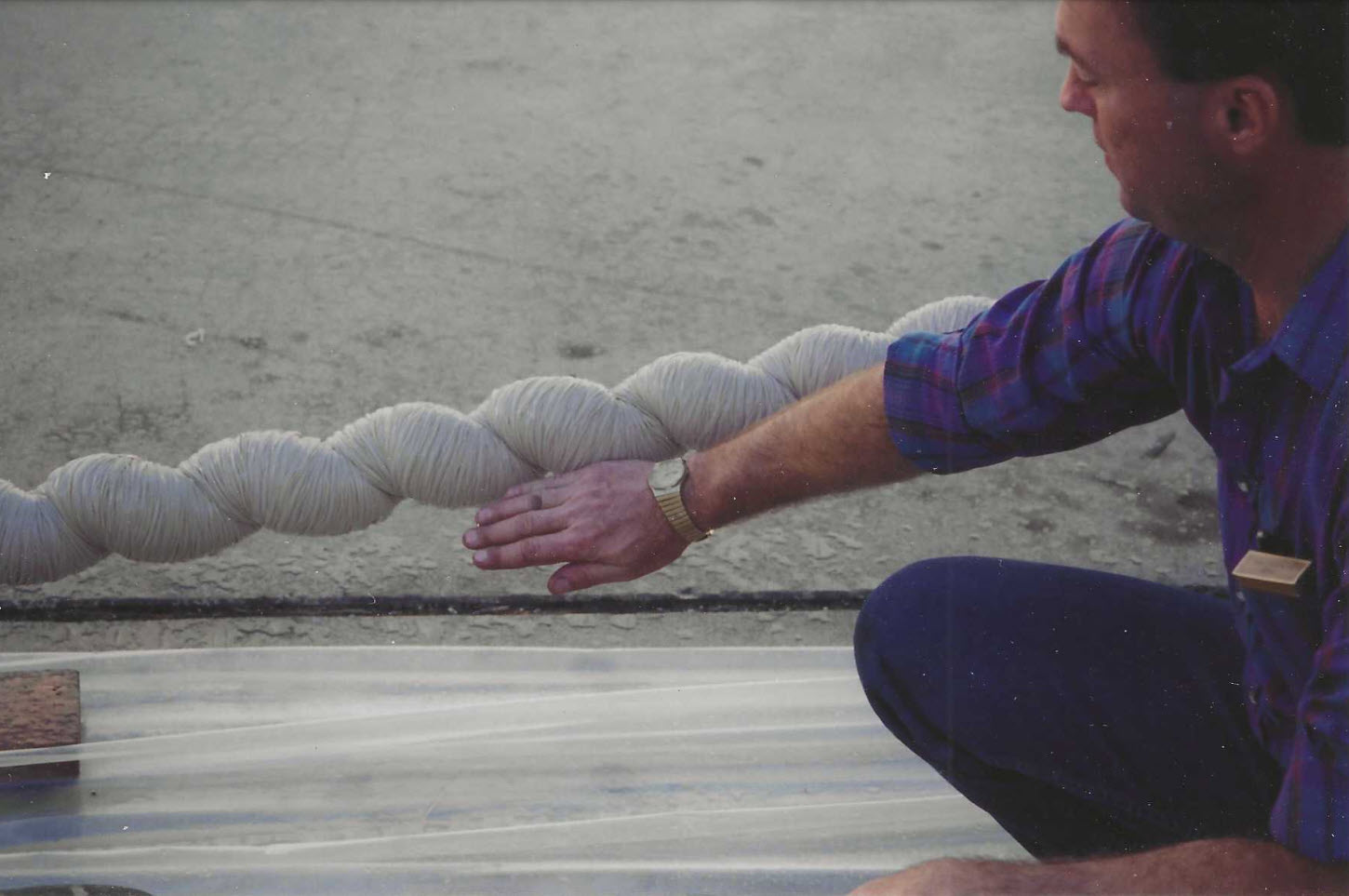
First knot on full-sized rubber motor.

The motor was made of 0.25 in (0.64 cm)-wide rubber, folded into 800 strands, and measured 20 ft (6.1 m) long and would be wound up to 800 revolutions. The motor is lubricated with 3 gallons of castor oil. According to an article in Flying the motor, fully wound, would initially generate the equivalent of 11 hp (8.2 kW), at high torque and rpm, before reducing down to 4 hp (3.0 kW) after 20 seconds. The motor would run for an estimated 90 seconds, sufficient for the airplane to take off and make a 0.5 mi (0.80 km) flight.

== Testing ==
Initial media coverage indicated the airplane would be completed and flight testing undertaken before the end of 1996. A 1998 Los Angeles Times article reported that the first taxi tests took place in March 1998, with the second being on May 3. A 2011 article published on the Sustainable Skies website reported that testing of the Rubber Bandit had continued through to 2003, with some short hops but no flights being made.

== Specifications ==
Data from George Heaven

General characteristics

- Crew: 1 pilot 175 lb (79.38 kg)
- Capacity: 1 passenger 100 lb (45.36 kg)
- Length: 33 ft (10 m)
- Wingspan: 76 ft (23 m)
- Wing area: 338 sq ft (31.4 m^{2})
- Aspect ratio: 17.08
- Airfoil: NACA laminar flow, 15% thickness
- Empty weight: 250 lb (113 kg) not including rubber motor
- Gross weight: 615 lb (279 kg)
- Powerplant: 1 × 90 lb rubber motor 20 ft long, 11 hp (8.2 kW)
- Propellers: 2-bladed, 18 ft 2 in (5.54 m) diameter ground adjustable pitch

Performance

- Maximum speed: 55 mph (89 km/h, 48 kn)
- Cruise speed: 32 mph (51 km/h, 28 kn)
- Stall speed: 20 mph (32 km/h, 17 kn)
- Range: 1.0 mi (1.6 km, 0.87 nmi)
- Endurance: 2 minutes
- Wing loading: 1.82 lb/sq ft (8.9 kg/m^{2})
