= Larry Hurtado =

American theologian (1943–2019)

Larry Hurtado FRSE
- Born: Larry Weir Hurtado; December 29, 1943; Kansas City, Missouri, U.S.
- Died: November 25, 2019 (aged 75); Edinburgh, Scotland

Academic background
- Education: Central Bible College (BA, 1965); Trinity Evangelical Divinity School (MA, 1967); Case Western Reserve University (PhD, 1973)
- Thesis: Codex Washingtonianus in the Gospel of Mark (1973)
- Doctoral advisor: Eldon Jay Epp

Academic work
- Discipline: Biblical studies
- Sub-discipline: New Testament studies
- Institutions: University of Edinburgh; University of Manitoba
- Doctoral students: Michael J. Kruger
- Notable works: Lord Jesus Christ: Devotion to Jesus in Earliest Christianity (2003); How on Earth Did Jesus Become a God? Historical Questions about Earliest Devotion to Jesus (2005)
- Website: larryhurtado.wordpress.com

Larry Weir Hurtado FRSE (December 29, 1943 – November 25, 2019) was an American New Testament scholar and historian of early Christianity. He served as Emeritus Professor of New Testament Language, Literature, and Theology at the University of Edinburgh from 1996 to 2011. Hurtado headed the School of Divinity from 2007 to 2010 and directed the Centre for the Study of Christian Origins until August 2011.

== Biography ==
Born in Kansas City, Missouri, on December 29, 1943, Hurtado studied at Central Bible College and Trinity Evangelical Divinity School. While at TEDS, he majored in New Testament studies and earned a Master of Arts in New Testament in 1967. He completed his Ph.D. in 1973 at Case Western Reserve University under Eldon Jay Epp with the dissertation Codex Washingtonianus in the Gospel of Mark: Its Textual Relationships and Scribal Characteristics.

Hurtado received his first academic appointment at Regent College in Vancouver, British Columbia, Canada, where he taught from 1975 to 1978. Before moving to Canada in 1975, he pastored a church in Skokie, Illinois. He then joined the Department of Religion at the University of Manitoba in Winnipeg, was promoted to full professor in 1988, and remained at the university until 1996. During this period he founded the University of Manitoba Institute for the Humanities and served as its first director from 1990 to 1992. After his appointment at the University of Edinburgh, he established the Centre for the Study of Christian Origins, which focuses on Christianity in the first three centuries.

Hurtado was elected to the Studiorum Novi Testamenti Societas in 1984 and received the Rh Institute Award for Outstanding Contributions to Scholarship and Research in the Humanities in 1986. He became a Fellow of the Royal Society of Edinburgh in 2008 and served as President of the British New Testament Society from 2009 to 2012. He secured research grants from the Social Sciences and Humanities Research Council of Canada, the British Academy, and the Arts and Humanities Research Council (UK). He gave invited lectures in many universities in the UK and other countries and was a visiting fellow at Macquarie University in Australia in 2005.

The School of Divinity announced that Hurtado had died of cancer in his sleep on November 25, 2019. The University of Edinburgh created a postgraduate scholarship fund for candidates studying Christian origins in his honor. Holly J. Carey, Professor of Biblical Studies and Department Chair of Biblical Studies at Point University, wrote an obituary in his honour for Christianity Today.

== Works ==
=== Books ===
- Hurtado, Larry W. (1981). Text-Critical Methodology and the Pre-Caesarean Text: Codex W in the Gospel of Mark. Studies and Documents. Vol. 43. Grand Rapids, MI: Eerdmans. ISBN 9780802818720. OCLC 7206722.
- ——— (1988). One God, One Lord: Early Christian Devotion and Ancient Jewish Monotheism. Philadelphia, PA: Fortress Press. ISBN 9780800620769. OCLC 17234318.
- ——— (1990). Mark. New International Biblical Commentary. Peabody, MA: Hendrickson Publishers. ISBN 9780943575162. OCLC 20693882.
- ——— (1999). At the Origins of Christian Worship: The Context and Character of Earliest Christian Devotion, the 1999 Didsbury Lectures. Carlisle, UK: Paternoster Press. ISBN 9780802847492. OCLC 44133065.
- ——— (2003). Lord Jesus Christ: Devotion to Jesus in Earliest Christianity. Grand Rapids, MI: Eerdmans. ISBN 9780802860705. OCLC 51623141.
- ——— (2005). How on Earth did Jesus Become a God? Historical Questions about Earliest Devotion to Jesus. Grand Rapids, MI: Eerdmans. ISBN 9780802828613. OCLC 61461917.
- ——— (2006). The Earliest Christian Artifacts: Manuscripts and Christian. Grand Rapids, MI: Eerdmans. ISBN 9780802828958. OCLC 70668672.
- ——— (2010). God in New Testament Theology. Library of Biblical Theology. Nashville, TN: Abingdon Press. ISBN 9781426719547. OCLC 891464651.
- ——— (2016). Destroyer of the Gods: early Christian distinctiveness in the Roman World. Waco, TX: Baylor University Press. ISBN 9781481304733. OCLC 950202343.
- ——— (2016). Why on Earth Did Anyone Become a Christian in the First Three Centuries?. Milwaukee, WI: Marquette University Press. ISBN 9781626005044.
- ——— (2018). Honoring the Son: Jesus in Earliest Christian Devotional Practice. Bellingham, WA: Lexham Press. ISBN 9781683590965.

=== As editor ===
- ———, ed. (2006). The Freer Biblical Manuscripts: fresh studies of an American treasure trove. Text-Critical Studies. Vol. 6. ISBN 9781589832084. OCLC 69423242.
- ———; Owen, Paul L., eds. (2011). 'Who is this son of man?' the latest scholarship on a puzzling expression of the historical Jesus. Library of New Testament studies. Vol. 390. London & New York: T & T Clark. ISBN 9780567521194. OCLC 670507593.

=== Articles and chapters ===
- ——— (1997). "Greco-Roman Textuality and the Gospel of Mark: A Critical Assessment of Werner Kelber's The Oral and the Written Gospel". Bulletin for Biblical Research. 7: 91–106. doi:10.2307/26422322. JSTOR 26422322.
- ——— (1999). "New Testament Studies at the Turn of the Millennium: Questions for the Discipline". Scottish Journal of Theology. 52 (2): 158–78. doi:10.1017/S0036930600053606. S2CID 170502319.
- ——— (2003). "Homage to the Historical Jesus and Early Christian Devotion". Journal for the Study of the Historical Jesus. 1 (2): 131–46. doi:10.1177/147686900300100201.
- ——— (2018). "Observations on the "Monotheism" Affirmed in the New Testament". In Beeley, Christopher A.; Weedman, Mark E. (eds.). The Bible and Early Trinitarian Theology. Washington, D.C.: Catholic University of America Press. pp. 50–70. ISBN 978-0813229959.
