= John Heaven =

John Heaven (1723–1794) was Mayor of Bedford, England from 1768 to 1769.

== Personal life ==
John Heaven was born in Holborn, London, England. Heaven was a relative of a family of yeomen settled at Minchinhampton, Gloucestershire.

Before pursuing politics, Heaven worked as a turner and joiner whilst still residing in Holborn's Bedford Charity estate.

John Heaven joined the Moravian community within Bedford in 1748. Though he would later leave the Moravian Church likely once he was elected a freeman of Bedford due to the prerequisite of being a member of Church of England.

== Political career ==
Heaven was elected a freeman of Bedford in 1759. He also became a communicant member of the Church of England before taking up his office

He was then elected to the positions of common councilman and burgess of Bedford in 1767 (when he took the Test).

In 1768, during the Corporation of Bedford's elections, the Upper House nominated Thomas Coe and the Lower House nominated John Heaven as candidates for mayor. However, neither had served the traditional preliminary offices (bailiff or chamberlain), which led to protests from the senior officials.

Mayoral Election Results 1768
Candidate	Bedfordshire		Notes
Candidate	Votes	%	Notes
Robert Richards	95	78.51%	Only "qualified candidate"
John Heaven	18	14.88%	
Thomas Coe	8	6.61%	
Total Counted Votes	121	100.00%	

Despite Richards’ clear victory, the retiring mayor, Gidney Phillips, admitted Heaven into office. This defiance of the popular choice triggered legal proceedings in the Court of King's Bench. A compromise was eventually reached, and Heaven continued in office for the year, even though the proper regulations had been bypassed. He was inaugurated on Michaelmas 1768 (29 September 1768) and as Mayor he was automatically made an Alderman of Bedford.

After his mayoral year, Heaven seemingly went back to Holborn as he would later become receiver of the Charity estates in 1787, removing him from the Alderman position. He maintained his ties to the Moravian community, in 1793 he sent a specially made sundial to the Bedford Moravian chapel as a gift. He stated "I have every reason to believe it to be in point of workmanship, as good as can be made, and in performance will prove to be so, long, yea very long, after you and myself, have quitted our earthly Tabernacles". He wished the item to be put over the table where the Labourer sits, and had had it engraved to record his attachment to the Brethren.

John Heaven died in 1794.
