= Misquoting Jesus =

Book by Bart D. Ehrman

Misquoting Jesus: The Story Behind Who Changed the Bible and Why
- First edition
- Author: Bart D. Ehrman
- Language: English
- Subject: Textual criticism
- Publisher: HarperCollins
- Publication date: 2005
- Pages: 256
- ISBN: 978-0-06-073817-4
- OCLC: 59011567
- Dewey Decimal: 225.4/86 22
- LC Class: BS2325 .E45 2005
- Preceded by: Truth and Fiction in The Da Vinci Code: A Historian Reveals What We Really Know about Jesus, Mary Magdalene, and Constantine (2004)
- Followed by: The Lost Gospel of Judas Iscariot: A New Look at Betrayer and Betrayed (2006)

Misquoting Jesus: The Story Behind Who Changed the Bible and Why (published as Whose Word Is It? in the United Kingdom) is a Christian textual criticism book by Bart D. Ehrman, a New Testament scholar at University of North Carolina at Chapel Hill. Published in 2005 by HarperCollins, the book introduces lay readers to the field of textual criticism of the Bible. Ehrman discusses a number of textual variants that resulted from intentional or accidental manuscript changes during the scriptorium era. The book made it to the New York Times best-seller list and is Ehrman's best-selling book.

== Contents ==
No.	Title	Focus
	Introduction	Framing of aims and scope, definition of textual criticism for non-specialists, overview of how scribal transmission and editorial activity generated divergent witnesses to the New Testament text.
1	The Beginnings of Christian Scripture	Emergence of Christian textuality in the first two centuries, production settings, reading practices in assemblies, early circulation patterns and the absence of fixed canons.
2	The Copyists of the Early Christian Writings	Conditions of hand copying before professional scriptoria, typical unintentional errors, intentional changes introduced for clarity, style, and doctrine.
3	Texts of the New Testament: Editions, Manuscripts, and Differences	Witness classes and text types, Alexandrian Western Byzantine, quantitative scale of extant manuscripts, description of variation units and apparatus conventions.
4	The Quest for Origins: Methods and Discoveries	Development of text critical method, Lachmann Westcott Hort Tischendorf, discovery history of major codices, external and internal evidence criteria.
5	Originals That Matter	Conceptual problems with the term original, authorial drafts, dictation, multiple editions, community redaction, implications for the goal of reconstruction.
6	Theologically Motivated Alterations of the Text	Case studies where readings likely reflect doctrinal interest, adoptionist and anti adoptionist revisions, christological and ecclesial controversies that shaped transmission outcomes.
7	The Social Worlds of the Text	Social location of scribes and readers, institutional enforcement of orthodoxy, how use contexts in liturgy catechesis and controversy affected copying behavior.
	Conclusion: Changing Scripture, Scribes, Authors, and Readers	Synthesis of historical claims, consequences for translation and interpretation, program for responsible reception of a text transmitted by fallible agents.

=== Analysis ===
The book operationalizes textual criticism for a general readership, it maps the New Testament textual tradition as a large scale documentary system with dense variation and heterogeneous provenance. Ehrman recounts his personal experiences with the study of the Bible and textual criticism. He summarizes the history of textual criticism, from the works of Desiderius Erasmus to the present. The book describes an early Christian environment in which the books that would later compose the New Testament were copied by hand, mostly by Christian amateurs.

Ehrman concentrates on meaningful variants, treating famous cruxes such as the longer ending of Mark, the story of the woman taken in adultery, and the Johannine Comma to show how doctrinal interests correlate with specific readings that entered late into the printed tradition.

The biblical scholar concludes that various early scribes altered the New Testament texts in order to de-emphasize the role of women in the early church, to unify and harmonize the different portrayals of Jesus in the four gospels, and to oppose certain heresies (such as Adoptionism).

Ehrman discusses the significance in understanding how Christianity stemmed from Judaism. Christianity was foreshadowed by Judaism, and was seen as the first "religion of the book" in Western civilization. Judaism, in its earliest years, was distinctive in some ways to other religions; it was the most-recognized monotheistic faith, set apart from all the other faiths that were polytheistic. The most significant and unique aspect of Judaism, Ehrman points out, was of having instructions along with ancestral traditions written down in sacred books, which were found in no other religious faith on the face of the earth during the given time period. The sacred books read by the Jews stressed ancestral traditions, customs, and laws. In order to pinpoint the canonization of the religion of Christianity, Ehrman discusses how the New Testament came into existence during the first century of the common era. Jews were scattered throughout the Roman Empire, and only relied upon the writings given to Moses by God, the Torah, which literally means "law" or "guidance". Ehrman continues on discussing how those writings were canonized and then later on recognized as the "Old Testament" following the rise of Christianity at the given time period.

In order to summarize his point that Christianity at its beginning was a religion of the book, Ehrman concludes how Jesus himself was a rabbi and adhered to all the sacred books held by the Jews, especially the Torah.

The 2005 paperback edition featured an interview with Ehrman in which he clarified his view in contrast with the view of his mentor, Bruce M. Metzger. Ehrman said, "The position I argue for in Misquoting Jesus does not actually stand at odds with Prof. Metzger’s position that the essential Christian beliefs are not affected by textual variants in the manuscript tradition of the New Testament" and "[m]ost textual variants (Prof. Metzger and I agree on this) have no bearing at all on what a passage means".

=== Notes on method ===
Ehrman defines textual criticism as historical inference from surviving witnesses to the earliest attainable text. External evidence is weighed by relative antiquity, independent attestation across text types, and geographical distribution. Internal evidence is weighed by authorial style and context and by intrinsic and transcriptional probabilities, with lectio brevior and lectio difficilior applied as defeasible heuristics rather than rules. The reconstruction target is the earliest recoverable form within a living tradition, not a hypothetical inerrant archetype. Worked examples integrate these criteria with case specific contextual data, for example, harmonization across Synoptic parallels, smoothing of grammar or style, and doctrinal corrections that align a passage with later orthodoxy. The method is presented as reproducible analysis that yields defensible readings, it does not claim certainty where witnesses conflict and evidence is thin.

== Reviews and reception ==
Alex Beam of The Boston Globe wrote that the book was "a series of dramatic revelations for the ignorant", and that "Ehrman notes that there have been a lot of changes to the Bible in the past 2,000 years. I don't want to come between Mr. Ehrman and his payday, but this point has been made much more eloquently by... others."

Jeffrey Weiss of The Dallas Morning News wrote, "Whichever side you sit on regarding Biblical inerrancy, this is a rewarding read." The American Library Association wrote, "To assess how ignorant or theologically manipulative scribes may have changed the biblical text, modern scholars have developed procedures for comparing diverging texts. And in language accessible to non-specialists, Ehrman explains these procedures and their results. He further explains why textual criticism has frequently sparked intense controversy, especially among scripture-alone Protestants."

Charles Seymour of the Wayland Baptist University in Plainview, Texas, wrote, "Ehrman convincingly argues that even some generally received passages are late additions, which is particularly interesting in the case of those verses with import for doctrinal issues such as women's ordination or the Atonement."

Neely Tucker of The Washington Post wrote that the book is "an exploration into how the 27 books of the New Testament came to be cobbled together, a history rich with ecclesiastical politics, incompetent scribes and the difficulties of rendering oral traditions into a written text."

Craig Blomberg, of Denver Seminary in Colorado, wrote on the Denver Journal that "Most of Misquoting Jesus is actually a very readable, accurate distillation of many of the most important facts about the nature and history of textual criticism, presented in a lively and interesting narrative that will keep scholarly and lay interest alike." Blomberg also wrote that Ehrman "has rejected his evangelicalism and whether he is writing on the history of the transmission of the biblical text, focusing on all the changes that scribes made over the centuries, or on the so-called 'lost gospels' and 'lost Christianities,' trying to rehabilitate our appreciation for Gnosticism, it is clear that he has an axe to grind."

In 2007, Timothy Paul Jones wrote a book-length response to Misquoting Jesus, called Misquoting Truth: A Guide to the Fallacies of Bart Ehrman's "Misquoting Jesus", published by InterVarsity Press. Novum Testamentum suggested that Misquoting Truth was a useful example of how conservative readers have engaged Ehrman's arguments.

In 2008, evangelical biblical scholar Craig A. Evans wrote Fabricating Jesus: How Modern Scholars Distort the Gospels, which responded to Ehrman's work among others. The book critiques several scholars of the historical Jesus, including the Jesus Seminar, Robert Eisenman, Morton Smith, James Tabor, Michael Baigent, Elaine Pagels, and Ehrman himself. Evans argues that these scholars present what he considers inaccurate portrayals of Jesus and questions the historical reliability of New Testament apocrypha.

In 2011, Daniel B. Wallace provided academic responses to Ehrman's evaluation of textual variants and questioned his views on orthodox scribal corruption, while noting that Ehrman does agree the New Testament text is well preserved.

In 2014, evangelical biblical scholar Craig Blomberg published Can We Still Believe the Bible? An Evangelical Engagement with Contemporary Questions, which includes a response to Misquoting Jesus. Blomberg argues that the textual variants discussed by Ehrman are already well-known among biblical scholars and are typically noted in modern Bible editions. He contends that these textual variations do not affect core Christian doctrines.

In 2019, other fellow New Testament textual critics shed light on misconceptions that have emerged from Ehrman's book and have offered clarification.

== See also ==
- List of Bible verses not included in modern translations
- Textual criticism
- Textus Receptus
