= Novum Testamentum =

- Discipline: New Testament
- Language: English, French, German
- Edited by: Cilliers Breytenbach; Johan Thom

Publication details
- History: 1956-present
- Publisher: Brill
- Frequency: Quarterly

Standard abbreviations
- ISO 4: Novum Testam.

Indexing
- ISSN: 0048-1009 (print); 1568-5365 (web)

Links
- Journal homepage

Novum Testamentum is an academic journal covering various aspects of "the New Testament and related studies". It was first published in 1956.
