= Michael J. Kruger =

American theologian

- Occupations: New Testament scholar; Presbyterian minister
- Spouse: Melissa B. Kruger

Academic background
- Education: University of North Carolina at Chapel Hill (BS); Westminster Seminary California (MDiv); University of Edinburgh (PhD)
- Thesis: The Gospel of the Savior: An Analysis of P.Oxy. 840 and Its Place in the Gospel Traditions of Early Christianity (2004)
- Doctoral advisor: Larry W. Hurtado

Academic work
- Discipline: Biblical studies
- Institutions: Reformed Theological Seminary
- Main interests: New Testament canon
- Notable works: The Heresy of Orthodoxy: How Contemporary Culture's Fascination with Diversity Has Reshaped Our Understanding of Early Christianity (2010) (Note: Co-authored with Andreas J. Köstenberger.); Canon Revisited: Establishing the Origins and Authority of the New Testament Books (2012); The Question of Canon: Challenging the Status Quo in the New Testament Debate (2013)
- Website: michaeljkruger.com

Michael J. Kruger is an American Reformed New Testament scholar and Presbyterian pastor. He is the Samuel C. Patterson Chancellor's Professor of New Testament and Early Christianity at Reformed Theological Seminary (RTS). Kruger previously served as the President of the RTS Charlotte campus between 2013 and 2025. Kruger has ministered in the Presbyterian Church in America, along with the Evangelical Presbyterian Church, being his church body since 2021.

During his studies at the University of North Carolina at Chapel Hill, Kruger was a student of atheist biblical scholar Bart D. Ehrman. However, Kruger found that carrying out the study of biblical manuscripts "strengthened his faith."

== Education ==
Kruger obtained his bachelor's degree from the University of North Carolina at Chapel Hill followed by an M. Div. from Westminster Seminary California. His doctoral studies were at the University of Edinburgh where his advisor was Larry Hurtado. His dissertation is a study of P.Oxy. 840.

== Career ==
During the 2009-2010 academic year, Kruger was a visiting scholar at Saint Edmund's College, Cambridge. In 2019, Kruger served as president of the Evangelical Theological Society.

In 2022, Kruger published Bully Pulpit: Confronting the Problem of Spiritual Abuse in the Church. In the book, Kruger argues that "spiritual abuse is when a spiritual leader ... wields his position of spiritual authority in such a way that he manipulates, domineers, bullies, and intimidates those under him as a means of maintaining his own power and control, even if he is convinced he is seeking biblical and kingdom-related goals." In response to the work, Kruger won The Gospel Coalition's 2022 Book of the Year award in the Ministry category. In addition, Kruger was a co-winner in the Midwestern Baptist Theological Seminary's 2022 For the Church book awards.

=== Canon studies ===
Kruger's work focuses on the Canon of the New Testament, particularly how the Christian church has historically understood which books belong in the Bible.

== Bibliography ==
Kruger has authored and edited a variety of books surrounding academic studies, the New Testament canon, and contemporary Christian issues:

- The Gospel of the Savior: An Analysis of P.Oxy. 840 and Its Place in the Gospel Traditions of Early Christianity (Leiden, Netherlands: Brill, 2005)
- Gospel Fragments (New York, NY: Oxford University Press, 2009) (Note: Co-edited with Thomas J. Kraus and Tobias Nicklas.)
- The Heresy of Orthodoxy: How Contemporary Culture's Fascination with Diversity Has Reshaped Our Understanding of Early Christianity (Wheaton, IL: Crossway, 2010)
- Canon Revisited: Establishing the Origins and Authority of the New Testament Books (Wheaton, IL: Crossway, 2012)
- The Early Text of the New Testament (New York, NY: Oxford University Press, 2012) (Note: Co-edited with Charles E. Hill.)
- The Question of Canon: Challenging the Status Quo in the New Testament Debate (Downers Grove, IL: IVP Academic, 2013)
- A Biblical-Theological Introduction to the New Testament: The Gospel Realized (Wheaton, IL: Crossway, 2016) (Note: Kruger contributes to this volume as its editor.)
- Christianity at the Crossroads: How the Second Century Shaped the Future of the Church (Downers Grove, IL: IVP Academic, 2018) (Note: Originally published in the United Kingdom by SPCK Publishing on July 20, 2017.)
- The Ten Commandments of Progressive Christianity (Minneapolis, MN: Cruciform Press, 2019)
- Hebrews for You: Giving You an Anchor for the Soul (Epsom, England: The Good Book Company, 2021)
- Surviving Religion 101: Letters to a Christian Student on Keeping the Faith in College (Wheaton, IL: Crossway, 2021)
- 5 Things to Pray for Your Spouse: Prayers That Change and Strengthen Your Marriage (Epsom, England: The Good Book Company, 2022) (Note: Co-authored with Melissa B. Kruger.)
- Bully Pulpit: Confronting the Problem of Spiritual Abuse in the Church (Grand Rapids, MI: Zondervan, 2022)
- Miniature Codices in Early Christianity (New York, NY: Oxford University Press, 2025)
- The Good News Family Devotional: 52 Weeks Through the Gospel of Mark (Eugene, OR: Harvest House, 2026)
