= Reformed Theological Seminary =

American theological seminary

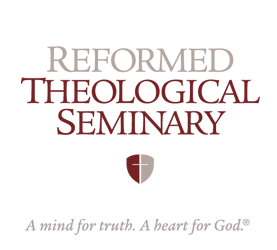
- Motto: A mind for truth. A heart for God.
- Type: Private seminary
- Established: 1966; 60 years ago
- Religious affiliation: Reformed Protestant
- Endowment: $78.6 million (2020)
- Chancellor: Ligon Duncan
- Provost: Robert Cara
- Students: 1022 (2024)
- Location: Jackson, Mississippi, United States
- Campus: Multiple campus locations
- Website: www.rts.edu

Reformed Theological Seminary (RTS) is a theological seminary in the Reformed theological tradition with campuses in multiple locations in the United States. Founded by conservatives in the Southern Presbyterian Church, the Presbyterian Church in the United States, 1966, serves primarily students from more conservative branches of the Presbyterian and Reformed traditions.

== Founding ==
In 1966, conservatives from the Southern Presbyterian Church, the Presbyterian Church in the United States (PCUS), concerned about the increasing influence of liberalism and neo-orthodoxy in the denomination's seminaries and pulpits, established Reformed Theological Seminary, independent from the PCUS, along "Old School" Presbyterian lines, to educate ministers. RTS has largely served the Presbyterian Church in America since that denomination's founding in 1973, then later the Evangelical Presbyterian Church and the Associate Reformed Presbyterian Church and in more recent years serves a large population of students from Particular Baptist and independent churches.

== Leadership ==
RTS is governed by a board of trustees exercising oversight through its administration. RTS is led by its executive committee, the chancellor of the RTS system and through the respective campus presidents. Ligon Duncan is Chancellor and CEO.

== Academics ==
RTS follows the Reformed tradition, including Covenant Theology.

=== Accreditation ===
Reformed Theological Seminary is accredited by the Association of Theological Schools in the United States and Canada to award the MDiv, MABS, MAR, MATS, MAC, MACC, and DMin degrees. It is also accredited by the Southern Association of Colleges and Schools Commission on Colleges to award masters and doctorate degrees. The MAC degree program is accredited by the Council for Accreditation of Counseling and Related Educational Programs.

=== Programs of study ===
RTS's institutional focus is on training students (especially in its Presbyterian and Reformed branches) to be pastors, missionaries, educators, and Christian counselors. RTS offers Doctor of Ministry (DMin), Master of Divinity (MDiv), and Master of Arts (MA) degrees in several subjects. Through its Global program, RTS offers the Master of Arts (Biblical studies) degree (MABS) and the Master of Arts (Theological Studies) degree (MATS). The degrees can be earned completely online.

=== Faculty ===
RTS has had many notable faculty members, adjunct professors, and visiting lecturers, including R.C. Sproul, John Frame, Roger Nicole, Ronald H. Nash, Steve Brown, Douglas F. Kelly, Richard L. Pratt, Jr., Michael J. Kruger, Justin S. Holcomb, Bruce Waltke, Willem A. VanGemeren, and Tim Keller.

In April 2010, Bruce Waltke offered to resign his professorship at Reformed Theological Seminary because of controversy over a video made by The BioLogos Foundation where he discussed his positive views on evolution. Waltke wrote in a letter that he found no fault with the administration of RTS on the matter.

== Campuses ==
RTS has campus locations in Jackson, Mississippi; Orlando, Florida; Charlotte, North Carolina; Atlanta, Georgia; Washington, D.C.; as well as its Global Campus. RTS also has sites in New York City, as well as Dallas and Houston in Texas.

RTS's Washington, D.C. campus is a member of the Washington Theological Consortium.

RTS's global campus traces its origins to the Orlando campus, from which distance education was first offered for RTS students in the early 1990s. In 1998, the Global campus became a separate "campus". The global campus eventually became the first online seminary to offer accredited degrees. The global offices are now located at the RTS Charlotte campus.
