= Epos Now =

Software provider based in Norwich, England

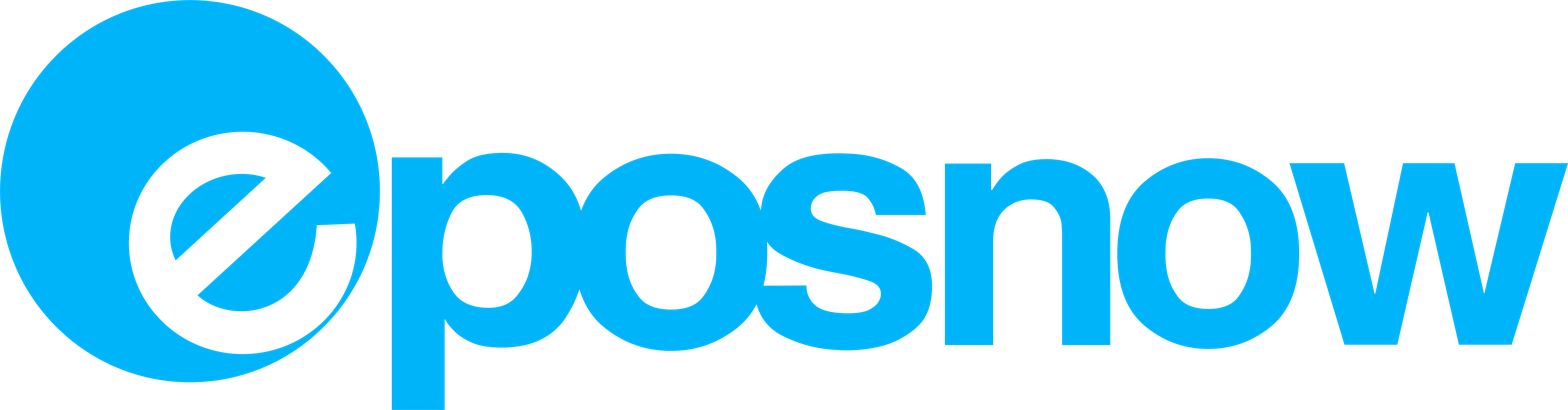
- Industry: Software as a Service (SaaS), Payments Services
- Founded: 2011; 15 years ago in Norwich, England
- Headquarters: Norwich, England, UK
- Areas served: Worldwide
- Products: Electronic point-of-sale systems, Integrated payment and embedded finance services
- Website: eposnow.com

Epos Now is a SaaS and payments services provider focusing on small, medium, and enterprise businesses within the retail, hospitality, and personal care sectors. The company offers a cloud-based POS and payments platform that enables merchants to manage sales, inventory, staff, and payments via a unified interface.

== History ==
Epos Now was founded in Norwich, England, in 2011 by Jacyn Heavens, who serves as the company's chief executive officer. The company initially operated as a small startup developing electronic point-of-sale (EPOS) software.

In the mid-2010s, Epos Now began expanding internationally, and in 2015 it opened its first United States office in Orlando, Florida, to support its North American operations.

In February 2020, Epos Now announced the acquisition of Australia's Epos Systems Pty, which added new resources and customers in the Asia-Pacific region.

By late 2023, the company reported revenue of £59.6 million, representing a year-on-year increase of 25%. Epos Now was exploring strategic options, including the potential sale of a minority stake at an estimated valuation of approximately US$1.5 billion.

Epos Now was listed as the 24th fastest-growing UK technology company in 2023 on the E2E Tech 100 list in partnership with The Independent.

In November 2023, Epos Now was recognised as the fastest-growing technology company in Cambridgeshire and the East of England by Deloitte Fast 50.

In December 2024, Epos Now announced it was acquiring Yoello, a Cardiff-based fintech startup specialising in QR-ordering and open-banking payments. This deal was presented as a way to enhance Epos Now's embedded finance and mobile ordering capabilities, and was cited in industry press as solidifying its position in the global payments market.

As of 2025, according to a company statement, Epos Now reports annual revenues over US$150 million and serving around 90,000 merchant locations in 11 countries. The company maintains a presence in various regions, including the United Kingdom, Ireland, the United States, Mexico, Australia, New Zealand, Spain, and Canada.

== Platform and services ==
Epos Now provides a cloud-based POS platform used in the retail and hospitality sectors. The system allows remote access to business data such as sales, inventory, transaction records, and supports centralised management of multiple locations.

The software is compatible with different types of hardware, including touchscreen terminals and tablets. Users may use proprietary hardware or compatible third-party devices.

The platform supports integration with third-party applications, including accounting, e-commerce and CRM systems, enabling data exchange with external services such as bookkeeping, online sales and customer management tools.
