= The Triumph of Christianity =

Book by Bart D. Ehrman

The Triumph of Christianity: How a Forbidden Religion Swept the World
- Cover
- Author: Bart D. Ehrman
- Language: English
- Publisher: Simon & Schuster
- Publication date: February 13, 2018
- Media type: Print (hardback & paperback)
- Pages: 352
- ISBN: 9781501136702

The Triumph of Christianity: How a Forbidden Religion Swept the World is a book by American New Testament scholar Bart D. Ehrman. Published on February 13, 2018, by Simon & Schuster, the book concerns the history of early Christianity and its spread throughout the world.

== Reception ==
Tom Bissell, in his review of The Triumph of Christianity for The New York Times, commended both it and Ehrman's prior book The Orthodox Corruption of Scripture for showcasing Ehrman's "steadfast humanizing impulse". Bob Duffy of the Washington Independent Review of Books wrote that The Triumph of Christianity "remains solidly grounded in first-rate scholarship. And although a few loony emperors do lurk about and the (very) occasional persecution arises, the reader in search of the dramatic, the sentimental, or the miraculous is likely to find scant fulfillment here."

Paul W. Gleason, reviewing the book for Newsday, wrote that "Ehrman's conclusions are debatable, as he knows perfectly well. Like a good college lecture class, his book offers both a wealth of historical information and, to make sense of it all, a few plausible theories – including his own. He doesn't tell us what to think. He gives us a lot to think about."

The Wall Street Journal's Douglas Boin called The Triumph of Christianity "a chipper but superficial retelling of the rise of Christianity."
