= Historiography of early Christianity =

Historiography of early Christianity is the study of historical writings about early Christianity, which is the period before the First Council of Nicaea in 325. Historians have used a variety of sources and methods in exploring and describing Christianity during this time.

The growth of Christianity and its enhanced status in the Roman Empire after Constantine I led to the development of a distinct Christian historiography, influenced by both Christian theology and the Development of the Christian Biblical canon, encompassing new areas of study and views of history. The central role of the Bible in Christianity is reflected in the preference of Christian historians for written sources, compared to the classical historians' preference for oral sources and is also reflected in the inclusion of politically unimportant people. Christian historians also focused on development of religion and society. This can be seen in the extensive inclusion of written sources in the first Ecclesiastical History written by Eusebius of Caesarea around 324 and in the subjects it covers. Christian theology considered time as linear, progressing according to divine plan. As God's plan encompassed everyone, Christian histories in this period had a universal approach. For example, Christian writers often included summaries of important historical events prior to the period covered by the work.

Paul Barnett pointed out that "scholars of ancient history have always recognized the 'subjectivity' factor in their available sources" and "have so few sources available compared to their modern counterparts that they will gladly seize whatever scraps of information that are at hand." He noted that modern history and ancient history are two separate disciplines, with differing methods of analysis and interpretation.

Since the 19th-century, historians have learned much more about the early Christian community. Ferdinand Christian Baur applied Hegelian philosophy to church history and described a 2nd-century Christian community fabricating the gospels. Adolf Harnack was the leading expert in patristics, or the study of the Church Fathers, whose writings defined early Christian practice and doctrine. Harnack identified dramatic changes within the Christian Church as it adapted itself to the pagan culture of the Roman Empire. He also claimed early dates for the gospels, granting them serious historical value. Early texts such as the Didache (in 2nd-millennium copies) and the Gospel of Thomas (in two manuscripts dated as early as about 200 and 340) have been rediscovered in the last 200 years. The Didache, from the 1st century, provides insight into the Jewish Christians of the Jerusalem church. The Gospel of Thomas apparently reflects the beliefs of 1st-century, proto-gnostic Christians in Syria.

In the 20th century, scholars became more likely to see early Christian faith and practice as evolving out of the religious beliefs and practices of Second Temple Judaism and Hellenic beliefs and practices, rather than standing out in sharp contrast to them. Modern historians have come to accept Jesus' Jewish identity and that of the apostolic church (referred to as Jewish Christianity). The relationship of Paul of Tarsus and Judaism is still disputed. H. G. Wells, in his Outline of History, depicted Jesus as a man and Christianity as a religion of no divine distinction. Scholars such as Walter Bauer and Bart Ehrman have emphasized the diversity of early Christianity, with Proto-orthodox Christianity being one thread, against the traditional account of catholic unanimity.

== Sources ==
In its first few centuries, Christians made up a small minority of the population of the Roman Empire. The religion attracted little attention from writers with other religious beliefs, and few artifacts have been found to document Christianity in its earliest days. Most of the surviving documentation was written by Christians.

=== Historical Jesus ===
All the sources for the life of Jesus are documents, there is no physical or archeological evidence. Except for a few proponents of the Christ myth theory, it is generally accepted among scholars that Jesus existed. The main sources for biographical information about Jesus are the synoptic Gospels of Matthew, Mark and Luke. The synoptic Gospels do not agree on many of the details of Jesus' life, but the two events virtually all scholars agree actually took place were his baptism by John the Baptist and crucifixion under the Roman Prefect Pontius Pilate. Besides his baptism and execution, the synoptic Gospels describe Jesus' birth, ministry, miracles and resurrection.

=== Oral Tradition ===
Early Christianity relied on the Sacred Oral Tradition of what Jesus had said and done, as reported by his Apostles and Disciples. Apostles who had witnessed Jesus's teachings travelled around the Mediterranean basin, where they established churches and began oral traditions in various places, such as Jerusalem, Antioch, Caesarea, and Ephesus, all cities with sizable Jewish populations. These oral traditions were later written down as the four Gospels.

=== New Testament ===
The Gospel of Mark was written during c. 65–70, possibly motivated by the First Jewish-Roman War. The Gospel of Matthew was written c. 80–85 to convince a Jewish audience that Jesus was the expected Messiah (Christ) and greater than Moses. The Gospel of Luke, together with Acts (see Luke-Acts) was c. 85–90, considered the most literate and artistic of the gospels. Finally, the Gospel of John was written, portraying Jesus as the incarnation of the divine Word, who primarily taught about himself as a savior. All four gospels originally circulated anonymously, and they were attributed to Mark, Matthew, Luke, and John in the 2nd century. Various authors wrote further epistles and the Apocalypse of John.

Among the writings considered central to the development of Christianity are the Pauline epistles, letters written or more accurately "dictated" (Note: It may be that he employed an amanuensis, only occasionally writing himself, for example see Galatians 6:11, Romans 16:22, 1Corinthians 16:21, Colossians 4:18, 2Thessalonians 3:17, Philemon 1:19. Joseph Barber Lightfoot in his Commentary on the Epistle to the Galatians writes: "At this point [Gal 6:11] the Apostle takes the pen from his amanuensis, and the concluding paragraph is written with his own hand. From the time when letters began to be forged in his name (2 Thess 2:2; 3:17) it seems to have been his practice to close with a few words in his own handwriting, as a precaution against such forgeries… In the present case he writes a whole paragraph, summing up the main lessons of the epistle in terse, eager, disjointed sentences. He writes it, too, in large, bold characters (Gr. pelikois grammasin), that his handwriting may reflect the energy and determination of his soul.") by Paul of Tarsus to various churches. All of Paul's extant letters are now regarded as scripture. Some scholars think Paul articulated the first Christian theology: namely that all people inherit Adam's guilt (see Original Sin) and can only be saved from death by the atoning death of the Son of God, Jesus' crucifixion.

==== Defining scripture ====
Debates about scripture were underway in the mid-2nd century, concurrent with a drastic increase of new scriptures, both Jewish and Christian. Debates regarding practice and belief gradually became reliant on the use of scripture. Similarly, in the 3rd century a shift away from direct revelation as a source of authority occurred. "Scripture" still had a broad meaning and usually referred to the Septuagint among Greek speakers. Beyond the Torah (the Law) and some of the earliest prophetic works (the Prophets), there was no universal agreement to a canon, but it was not debated much at first. By the mid-2nd century, tensions arose with the growing rift between Christianity and Judaism, which some theorize led eventually to the determination of a Jewish canon by the emerging rabbinic movement, though, even as of today, there is no scholarly consensus as to when the Jewish canon was set, see Development of the Hebrew Bible canon for details. Some scholars argue that the Jewish canon was fixed by the Hasmonean dynasty (140–37 BCE).

Regardless, throughout the Jewish diaspora newer writings were still collected and the fluid Septuagint collection was the primary source of scripture for Christians. Many works under the names of known apostles, such as the Gospel of Thomas, were accorded scriptural status in at least some Christian circles. Apostolic writings, such as I Clement and the Epistle of Barnabas, were considered scripture even within the orthodoxy through the 5th century. A problem for scholars is that there is a lack of direct evidence on when Christians began accepting their own scriptures alongside the Septuagint. Well into the 2nd century, Christians held onto a strong preference for oral tradition as clearly demonstrated by writers of the time, such as Papias.

The acceptance of the Septuagint was generally uncontested (even the Peshitta appears to be influenced). Later Jerome would express his preference for adhering strictly to the Jewish canon, but his view held little currency even in his own day. It was not until the Protestant Reformation that substantial numbers of Christians began to reject those books of the Septuagint which are not found in the Jewish canon, referring to them as biblical apocrypha. In addition, some New Testament books were also disputed, see Antilegomena.

==== Historicity of the canonical Gospels ====
The historicity of the canonical Gospels refers to the reliability and historic character of the four New Testament gospels as historical documents. These gospels, Matthew, Mark, Luke and John recount the life, ministry, crucifixion and resurrection of Jesus. Historians subject the gospels to critical analysis, attempting to differentiate authentic, reliable information from what they judge to be inventions, exaggerations, and alterations.

Many prominent mainstream historians consider the synoptic gospels to contain much reliable historical information about the historical existence of Jesus as a Galilean teacher and of the religious movement he founded, but not everything contained in the gospels is considered to be historically reliable.

The Gospel of Mark, believed by scholars to be the first Gospel written, narrates the historically authentic baptism of Jesus, his preaching, and the crucifixion of Jesus. Matthew and Luke follow Mark's narrative, with some changes, and add substantial amounts of Jesus' ethical teaching, such as The Golden Rule. Elements whose historical authenticity is disputed include the two accounts of the nativity of Jesus, as well as certain details about the crucifixion and the resurrection.

While some Christian scholars maintain that the gospels are inerrant descriptions of the life of Jesus, other scholars have concluded that they provide no historical information about his life.

The teachings of Jesus in the Gospel of John are very different from those found in the synoptic gospels. Thus, since the 19th century scholars have generally believed that only one of the two traditions could be authentic. Today, prominent, mainstream historians largely tend to discount the historical value of John. Few scholars regard John to be at all comparable to the Synoptics in terms of historical value. E. P. Sanders and other critical scholars conclude that the Gospel of John contains an "advanced theological development, in which meditations of the person and work of Jesus are presented in the first person as if Jesus said them." The scholars of the Jesus Seminar assert that there is little historical value in John and consider nearly every Johannine saying of Jesus to be nonhistorical. Geza Vermes discounts all the teaching in John when reconstructing "the authentic gospel of Jesus."

The Gospel of John also differs from the synoptic gospels in respect of its narrative of Jesus' life and ministry; but here there is a lower degree of consensus that the synoptic tradition is to be preferred. In particular John A.T. Robinson has argued that, where the Gospel narrative accounts can be checked for consistency with surviving material evidence, the account in the Gospel of John is commonly the more plausible; and that it is generally easier to reconcile the various synoptic accounts within John's narrative framework, than it is to explain John's narrative within the framework of any of the synoptics. In particular he argues that, where in the Gospel of John, Jesus and his disciples are described as travelling around identifiable locations, then the trips in question can always be plausibly followed on the ground which he claims is not the case for the narrative accounts of any other of the four Gospels.

Some scholars today believe that parts of John represent an independent historical tradition from the synoptics, while other parts represent later traditions. The Gospel was probably shaped in part by increasing tensions between synagogue and church, or between those who believed Jesus was the Messiah and those who did not.

Nevertheless, John is not entirely without historical value. Critical scholarship in the 19th century distinguished between the 'biographical' approach of the three Synoptic Gospels and the 'theological' approach of John, and accordingly tended to disregard John as a historical source. This distinction is no longer regarded as sustainable in more recent scholarship, which emphasizes that all four gospels are both biographical and theological. According to Barnabas Lindars, "All four Gospels should be regarded primarily as biographies of Jesus, but all four have a definite theological aim." Sanders points out that the author would regard the gospel as theologically true as revealed spiritually even if its content is not historically accurate. The gospel does contain some independent, historically plausible elements. Henry Wansbrough says: "Gone are the days when it was scholarly orthodoxy to maintain that John was the least reliable of the gospels historically." It has become generally accepted that certain sayings in John are as old or older than their synoptic counterparts, that John's knowledge of things around Jerusalem is often superior to the synoptics, and that his presentation of Jesus' agony in the garden and the prior meeting held by the Jewish authorities are possibly more historically accurate than their synoptic parallels. And Marianne Meye Thompson writes: "There are items only in John that are likely to be historical and ought to be given due weight. Jesus' first disciples may once have been followers of the Baptist (cf. Jn. 1:35–42). There is no a priori reason to reject the report of Jesus and his disciples' conducting a ministry of baptism for a time. That Jesus regularly visited Jerusalem, rather than merely at the time of his death, is often accepted as more realistic for a pious, 1st-century Jewish male (and is hinted at in the other Gospels as well: Mark 11:2; Luke 13:34; 22:8–13,53) ... Even John's placement of the Last Supper before Passover has struck some as likely." Sanders, however, cautions that even historically plausible elements in John can hardly be taken as historical evidence, as they may well represent the author's intuition rather than historical recollection.

=== Fathers of the church ===
From an early date the title "Father" was applied to bishops as witnesses to the Christian tradition. Only later, from the end of the 4th century, was it used in a more restricted sense of a more or less clearly defined group of ecclesiastical authors of the past whose authority on doctrinal matters carried special weight. According to the commonly accepted teaching, the fathers of the church are those ancient writers, whether bishops or not, who were characterized by orthodoxy of doctrine, holiness of life and the approval of the church. Sometimes Tertullian, Origen and a few others of not unimpeachable orthodoxy are now classified as Fathers of the Church.

Post-apostolic, or Ante-Nicene, Fathers defined and defended Christian doctrine. The Apologists became prominent in the 2nd century. This includes such notable figures as Justin Martyr (died 165), Tatian (died c. 185), and Clement of Alexandria (c. 150-211/216). They debated with prevalent philosophers of their day, defending and arguing for Christianity. They focused mainly on monotheism and their harshest words were used for ancient mythologies. Fathers such as Irenaeus advocated the role of the apostolic succession of bishops in preserving apostolic teaching.

=== Dead Sea Scrolls ===
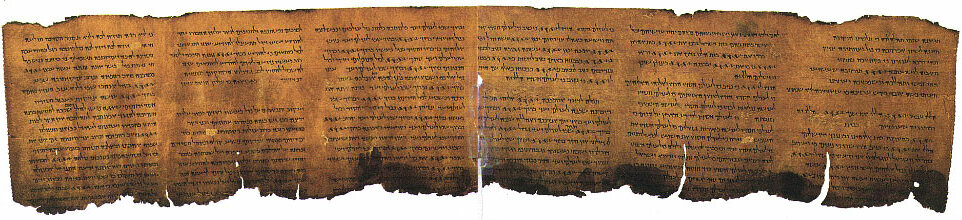
The Psalms Scroll

The Dead Sea Scrolls are a collection of about 900 documents, including texts from the Hebrew Bible, discovered between 1947 and 1956 in eleven caves in and around the ruins of the ancient settlement of Khirbet Qumran on the northwest shore of the Dead Sea in the West Bank.

The texts are of great religious and historical significance, as they include the oldest known surviving copies of Biblical and extra-biblical documents and preserve evidence of great diversity in late Second Temple Judaism. They are written in Hebrew, Aramaic and Greek, mostly on parchment, but with some written on papyrus. These manuscripts generally date between 150 BCE and 70 CE. The scrolls are traditionally identified with the ancient Jewish sect called the Essenes, though some recent interpretations have challenged this association and argue that the scrolls were penned by priests, Zadokites, or other unknown Jewish groups.

The Dead Sea Scrolls are traditionally divided into three groups: "Biblical" manuscripts (copies of texts from the Hebrew Bible), which compose roughly 40% of the identified scrolls; "Apocryphal" or "Pseudepigraphical" manuscripts (known documents from the Second Temple Period like Enoch, Jubilees, Tobit, Sirach, non-canonical psalms, etc., that were not ultimately canonized in the Hebrew Bible), which make up roughly 30% of the identified scrolls; and "Sectarian" manuscripts (previously unknown documents that speak to the rules and beliefs of a particular group or groups within greater Judaism) like the Community Rule, War Scroll, Pesher (Hebrew pesher פשר = "Commentary") on Habakkuk, and the Rule of the Blessing, which represent roughly 30% of the identified scrolls.

=== Gnostic Gospels ===
The Gnostic Gospels are gnostic collections of writings about the teachings of Jesus, written from the 2nd – 4th century. These gospels are not part of the standard Biblical canon of any major Christian denomination, and as such are part of what is called the New Testament apocrypha.

=== Nag Hammadi library ===
The Nag Hammadi library is a collection of early Christian Gnostic texts discovered near the Upper Egyptian town of Nag Hammadi in 1945. That year, twelve leather-bound papyrus codices buried in a sealed jar were found by a local peasant named Mohammed Ali Samman. The writings in these codices comprised fifty-two mostly Gnostic treatises, but they also include three works belonging to the Corpus Hermeticum and a partial translation/alteration of Plato's Republic. In his "Introduction" to The Nag Hammadi Library in English, James Robinson suggests that these codices may have belonged to a nearby Pachomian monastery, and were buried after Bishop Athanasius condemned the uncritical use of non-canonical books in his Festal Letter of 367 AD.

The contents of the codices were written in Coptic language, though the works were probably all translations from Greek. The best-known of these works is probably the Gospel of Thomas, of which the Nag Hammadi codices contain the only complete text. After the discovery it was recognized that fragments of these sayings attributed to Jesus appeared in manuscripts discovered at Oxyrhynchus in 1898, and matching quotations were recognized in other early Christian sources. Subsequently, a 1st or 2nd century date of composition c. 80 for the lost Greek originals of the Gospel of Thomas has been proposed, though this is disputed by many if not the majority of biblical matter researchers. The once buried manuscripts themselves date from the 3rd and 4th centuries.

The Nag Hammadi codices are housed in the Coptic Museum in Cairo, Egypt. To read about their significance to modern scholarship into early Christianity, see the Gnosticism article.

=== Josephus ===
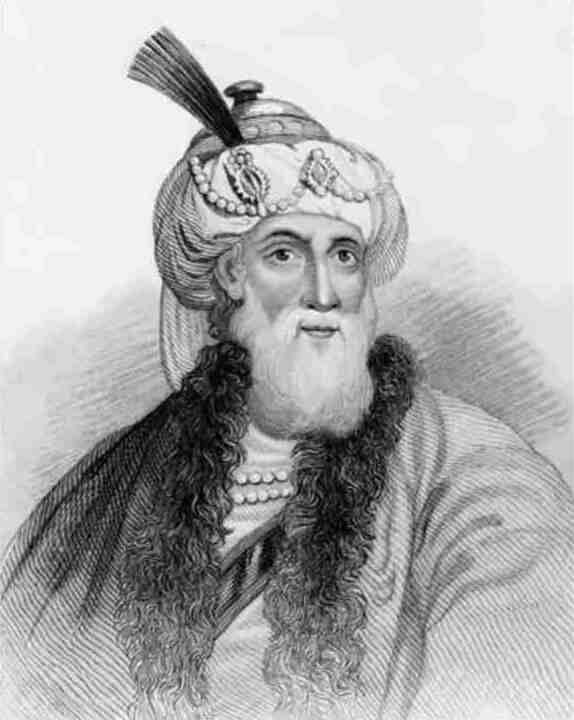
The romanticized engraving of Flavius Josephus appearing in William Whiston's translation of his works.

The works of Josephus provide crucial information about the First Jewish-Roman War and are also important literary source material for understanding the context of the Dead Sea Scrolls and late Temple Judaism. Josephus includes information about individuals, groups, customs and geographical places. His writings provide a significant, extra-Biblical account of the post-Exilic period of the Maccabees, the Hasmonean dynasty, and the rise of Herod the Great. He makes references to the Sadducees, Jewish High Priests of the time, Pharisees and Essenes, the Herodian Temple, Quirinius' census and the Zealots, and to such figures as Pontius Pilate, Herod the Great, Agrippa I and Agrippa II, John the Baptist, James the brother of Jesus, and a pair of disputed and undisputed references to Jesus (for more see Josephus on Jesus). He is an important source for studies of immediate post-Temple Judaism and the context of early Christianity.

=== Tacitus ===
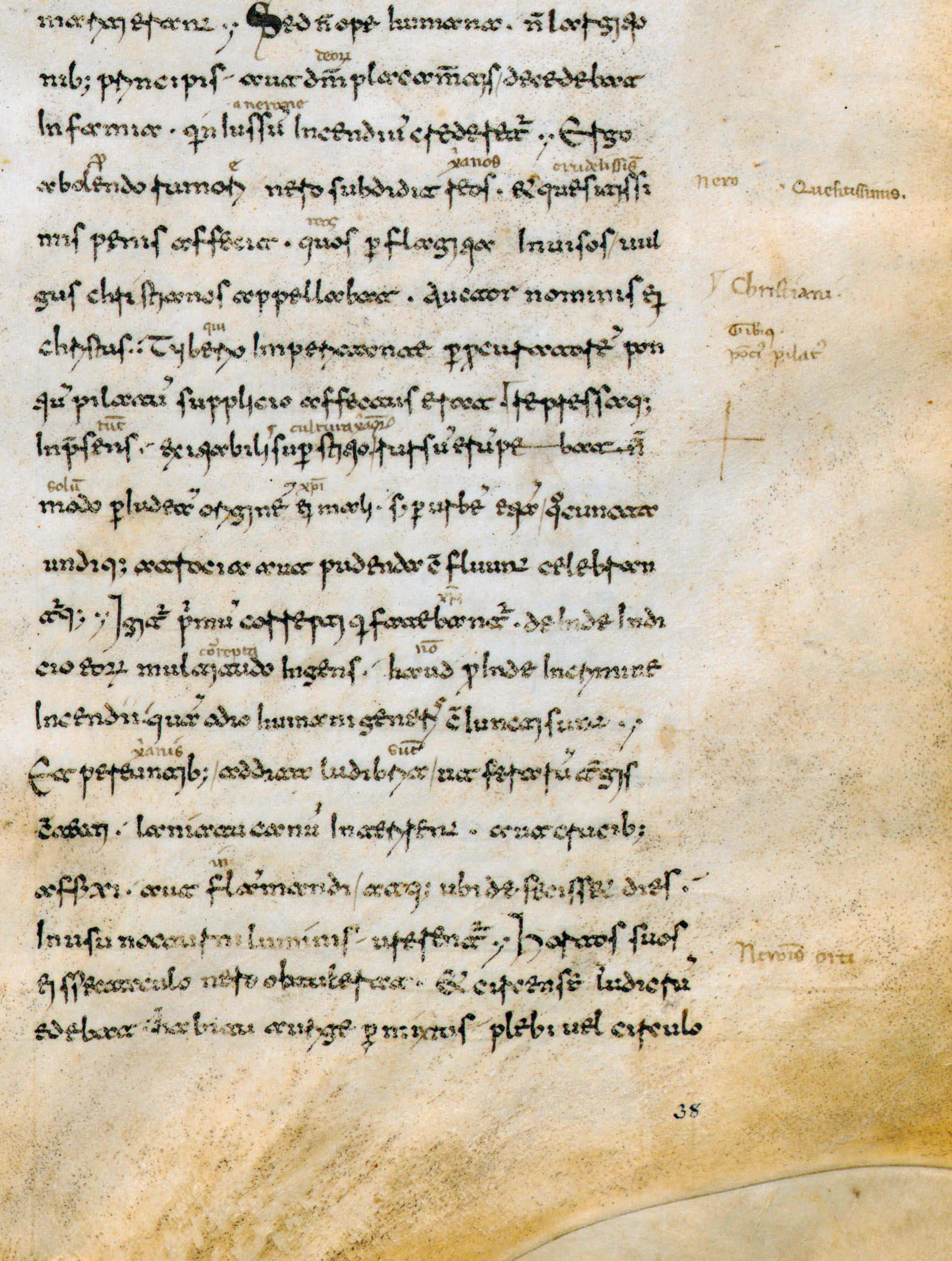
Detail of the page from an 11th century codex containing Annales, xv. 44.3–8, the passage with the reference to Christians (Florence, Laurentian Library, Plut. 68.2, f. 38r, fragm.)

The Annals is among the first-known secular-historic records to mention Jesus which Tacitus does in connection with Nero's persecution of the Christians. The passage contains an early non-Christian reference to the origin of Christianity, the execution of Christ described in the Bible's New Testament gospels, and the presence and persecution of Christians in 1st-century Rome. While a majority of scholars consider the passage authentic, some dispute it. Those supporting authenticity argue it is too critical of Christians to have been added by later Christian scribes.

Some who argue against authenticity assert:

- No early Christian writers refer to Tacitus even when discussing the subject of Nero and Christian persecution. Tertullian, Lactantius, Sulpicius Severus, Eusebius and Augustine of Hippo make no reference to Tacitus when discussing Christian persecution by Nero. (This is wrong, as Tertullian does refer to Tacitus' annals in his Apology) If authentic, the passage would constitute one of the earliest, if not the earliest (see: Josephus on Jesus) non-Christian references to Jesus. Those critical of the passage's authenticity argue that early Christian writers likely would have sought to establish the historicity of Jesus via secular or non-Christian documents, and that their silence with regard to the Annals in this manner may suggest that the passage did not exist in early manuscripts. Furthermore, because the text derives from a single surviving 11th century monastic copy, skeptics of the passage's authenticity argue that it may be the result of later Christian editing. Supporters of the passage's authenticity, however, counter on the basis of the criterion of embarrassment that the passage's critical remarks on Christianity as a "mischievous superstition" argue against its having been made by later Christian editors who, it is argued, would have cast Christians in a positive and not negative light. Critics counter that the criterion of embarrassment wrongly assumes that a scribal interpolator would not intentionally write details critical of his or her religious group, and that a scribe may have found it advantageous and convincing to supply a less embarrassing fact (e.g., that Christians were regarded by the Romans as subscribing to a "mischievous superstition") in the place of a more embarrassing one (e.g., no early, non-Christian references to a historical Jesus).
- Pontius Pilate's rank was prefect when he was in Judea. (Note: See The Pilate Inscription from Caesarea.) The Tacitus passage mistakenly calls Pilate a procurator, an error also made in translations of a passage by Josephus. (However, Josephus wrote in Greek and never used the Latin term.) After Herod Agrippa's death in AD 44, when Judea reverted to direct Roman rule, Claudius gave procurators control over Judea. This was made possible when he augmented the role of procurators so that they had magisterial power. Tacitus, who rose through the magisterial ranks (Note: These ranks were exclusively available for patricians only, while equestrians could become procurators.) to become consul and then proconsul had a precise knowledge of significance of the terms involved and knew when Judea began to be administered by procurators. It is therefore problematical that he would use "procurator" instead of "prefect" to describe the governor of Judea prior to the changes that he tells us Claudius brought in.
- The passage implies that the Christians may have been guilty of setting fire to Rome, another argument against veracity, for Tacitus was attempting to lay the blame of the fire on Nero by aspersion.
- Another ancient writer, Suetonius, mentions Christians being harmed during this period by Nero, but there is no connection made with the fire.

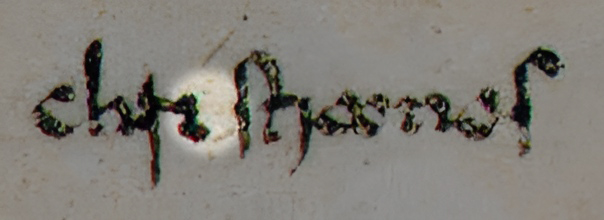
Detail of the Medicean manuscript showing the word 'Christianos'. The large gap between the 'i' and 's' has been highlighted; under ultraviolet light an 'e' is visible in the gap, replacing the 'i'

The surviving copies of Tacitus' major works derive from two principal manuscripts, known as the Medicean manuscripts, which are held in the Laurentian Library. The second of them (Plut. 68.2), as the only one containing books xi–xvi of the Annales, is the oldest witness to the passage describing Christians. In this codex, the first 'i' of the Christianos is quite distinct in appearance from the second, looking somewhat smudged, and lacking the long tail of the second 'i'; additionally, there is a large gap between the first 'i' and the subsequent long s. Georg Andresen was one of the first to comment on the appearance of the first 'i' and subsequent gap, suggesting in 1902 that the text had been altered, and an 'e' had originally been in the text, rather than this 'i'.

In 1950, at Harald Fuchs request, Dr. Teresa Lodi, the director of the Laurentian Library, examined the features of this item of the manuscript; she concluded that there are still signs of an 'e' being erased, by removal of the upper and lower horizontal portions, and distortion of the remainder into an 'i'. In 2008, Dr. Ida Giovanna Rao, the new head of the Laurentian Library's manuscript office, repeated Lodi's study, and concluded that it is likely that the 'i' is a correction of some earlier character (like an e), the change being made an extremely subtle one. Later the same year, it was discovered that under ultraviolet light, an 'e' is clearly visible in the space, meaning that the passage must originally have referred to chrestianos, a Latin word which could be interpreted as the good, after the Greek word χρηστός (chrestos), meaning 'good, useful'. "I believe that in our passage of Tacitus the original reading Chrestianos is the true one" says Professor Robert Renehan, stating that it was "natural for a Roman to interpret the words [Christus and Christianus] as the similarly-sounding χρηστός". The word Christian/s is in Codex Sinaiticus (in which Christ is abbreviated – see nomina sacra) spelled Chrestian/s in the three places the word is used. Also in Minuscule 81 this spelling is used in Acts of the Apostles 11:26.

== Jesus ==
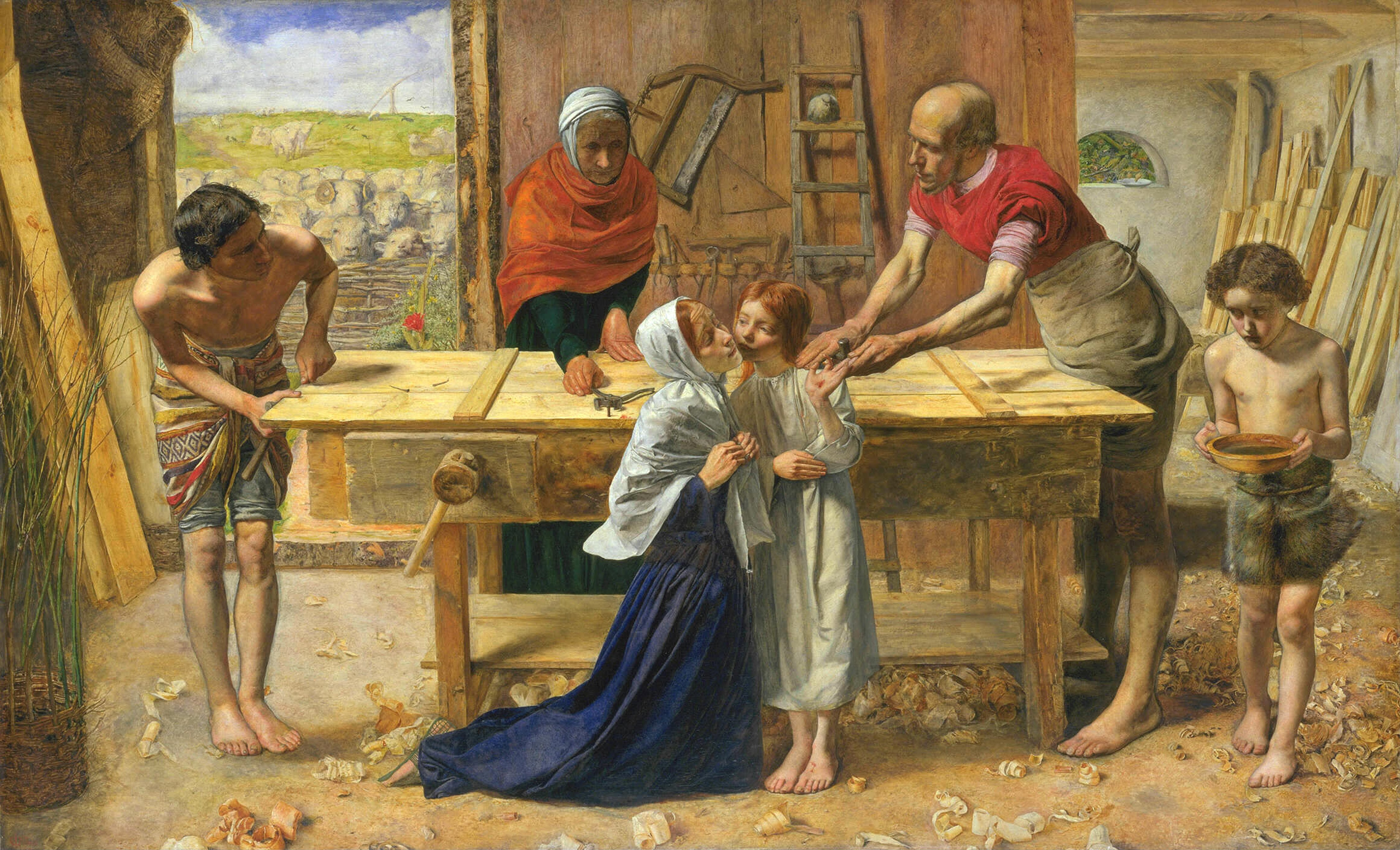
Christ in the House of his Parents by John Everett Millais, 1850. A number of paintings of the Pre-Raphaelite Brotherhood reflected the interest in the 19th century in the historical reality of the life of Jesus

The historicity of Jesus concerns the historical existence of Jesus of Nazareth. While scholars often draw a distinction between the Jesus of history and the Christ of faith, and while scholars further debate what can specifically be known concerning Jesus' character and ministry, essentially all scholars in the relevant fields agree that the mere historical existence of Jesus can be established using documentary and other evidence.

The lines of evidence used to establish Jesus' historical existence include the New Testament documents, theoretical source documents that may lie behind the New Testament, statements from the early Church Fathers, brief references in histories produced decades or centuries later by pagan and Jewish sources, gnostic documents, and early Christian creeds.

=== Historical Jesus ===
The Historical Jesus is a scholarly reconstruction of the 1st-century figure Jesus of Nazareth using modern historical methods. This reconstruction is based upon historical methods. These include critical analysis of gospel texts as the primary source for his biography, and non-biblical sources for the historical and cultural context in which he lived.

Since the 18th century, historians and biblical scholars have undertaken three scholarly quests for the historical Jesus, each with distinct characteristics and based on different research criteria, which were often developed during each specific phase. From Albert Schweitzer’s revolutionary work in 1906, to the controversial Jesus Seminar, much has been learned. The purpose of these scholars is to examine the evidence from diverse sources and critically bring it together in order that we can compile a totally up-to-date composite of Jesus. Use of the term the Historical Jesus implies that the figure thus reconstructed will differ from that presented in the teaching of the ecumenical councils ("the dogmatic Christ"). It will also sometimes differ from Jewish, Christian, Muslim or Hindu beliefs.

The historical Jesus was a Galilean Jew living in a time of messianic and apocalyptic expectations. He was baptized by John the Baptist, and after John was executed, Jesus began his own preaching in Galilee. He preached the salvation, everlasting life, cleansing from sins, Kingdom of God, using pithy parables with startling imagery and was renowned as a teacher and a healer. Many scholars credit the apocalyptic declarations that the gospels attribute to him, while others portray his Kingdom of God as a moral one, and not apocalyptic in nature. He sent his apostles out to heal and to preach the Kingdom of God. Later, he traveled to Jerusalem in Judea, where he caused a disturbance at the Temple. It was the time of Passover, when political and religious tensions were high in Jerusalem. The Gospels say that the temple guards (believed to be Sadducees) arrested him and turned him over to Pontius Pilate for execution. The movement he had started survived his death and was carried on by his apostles who proclaimed the resurrection of Jesus. It developed into Early Christianity (see also List of events in early Christianity).

The quest for the historical Jesus began with the work of Hermann Samuel Reimarus in the 18th century. Two books, both called The Life of Jesus were written by David Strauss, published in German in 1835–36, and Ernest Renan, published in French in 1863. The Historical Jesus is conceptually different than the Christ of Faith. The former is physical, while the latter metaphysical. The Historical Jesus is based on historical evidence. Every time a new scroll is unearthed or new Gospel fragment is found, the Historical Jesus is modified. And because so much has been lost, we can never know him completely.

In The Historical Figure of Jesus, E.P. Sanders used Alexander the Great as a paradigm—the available sources tell us much about Alexander’s deeds, but nothing about his thoughts. "The sources for Jesus are better, however, than those that deal with Alexander" and "the superiority of evidence for Jesus is seen when we ask what he thought." Thus, Sanders considers the quest for the Historical Jesus to be much closer to a search for historical details on Alexander than to those historical figures with adequate documentation.

Consequently, scholars like Sanders, Geza Vermes, John P. Meier, David Flusser, James H. Charlesworth, Raymond E. Brown, Paula Fredriksen and John Dominic Crossan argue that, although many readers are accustomed to thinking of Jesus solely as a theological figure whose existence is a matter only of religious debate, the four canonical Gospel accounts are based on source documents written within decades after Jesus' lifetime, and therefore provide a basis for the study of the "historical" Jesus. These historians also draw on other historical sources and archaeological evidence to reconstruct the life of Jesus in his historical and cultural context.

In contrast, Charles Guignebert, Professor of the History of Christianity, at the Sorbonne, maintained that the "conclusions which are justified by the documentary evidence may be summed up as follows: Jesus was born somewhere in Galilee in the time of the Emperor Augustus, of a humble family, which included half a dozen or more children besides himself." (Emphasis added). He adds elsewhere "there is no reason to suppose he was not executed".

Recent research has focused upon the "Jewishness" of the historical Jesus. The re-evaluation of Jesus' family, particularly the role played after his death by his brother James, has led scholars like Hans Küng to suggest that there was an early form of non-Hellenistic "Jewish Christianity" like the Ebionites, that did not accept Jesus' divinity and was persecuted by both Roman and Christian authorities. Küng suggests that these Jewish Christians settled in Arabia, and may have influenced the story of Christ as portrayed in the Qur'an.

=== Jesus as myth ===
The existence of Jesus as an actual historical figure has been questioned by few biblical scholars and historians, some of the earliest being Constantin-François Volney and Charles François Dupuis in the 18th century and Bruno Bauer in the 19th century. Each of these proposed that the Jesus character was a fusion of earlier mythologies.

The views of scholars who entirely rejected Jesus' historicity were summarized in Will Durant's Caesar and Christ, published in 1944. Their rejections were based on a suggested lack of eyewitnesses, a lack of direct archaeological evidence, the failure of ancient works to mention Jesus, and similarities early Christianity shares with then-contemporary religion and mythology.

More recently, arguments for non-historicity have been discussed by George Albert Wells, Earl Doherty (The Jesus Puzzle, 1999), Timothy Freke and Peter Gandy (The Jesus Mysteries) and Robert M. Price. Doherty, for example, maintains that the earliest records of Christian beliefs (the earliest epistles) contain almost no reference to the historical Jesus, which only appears in the Gospel accounts. He suggests that these are best explained if Christianity began as a mythic savior cult, with no specific historical figure in mind.

Nevertheless, the historicity of Jesus is accepted by almost all Biblical scholars and classical historians. The New Testament scholar James Dunn describes the mythical Jesus theory as a 'thoroughly dead thesis'.

== Founding of the Christian Church ==
According to Christian tradition, the Christian Church was founded by Jesus. In the Gospel according to Matthew, the resurrected Jesus gathered his Twelve Apostles together, issued the Great Commission, and selected Simon Peter as their leader, proclaiming "I will give you the keys of the kingdom of heaven". Many modern scholars, including some Catholic ones, flatly deny that Jesus ever even intended to found a Church, much less that he did so. Even those scholars who agree that Jesus founded some kind of Church are divided on whether he founded it on Simon Peter or gave him any sort of primacy. Even those scholars who accept that Peter held some sort of primacy among the apostles are divided on the issue of whether Jesus intended that primacy to be continued by others after Peter's death (apostolic succession). Even those scholars who accept that Jesus intended a continuing Petrine primacy are divided on whether this primacy was uniquely devolved upon the Church of Rome; some, for example, following the lead of Cyprian of Carthage, insist that the Petrine primacy is possessed by every bishop throughout the world who stands in legitimate apostolic succession, whether in communion with Rome or not. Even those scholars who accept that a unique Petrine primacy attached to the See of Rome are divided on exactly how and why that primacy became attached to Rome, by what means or succession it was passed down within the See of Rome, whether Rome itself remained true to that primacy, and exactly what authority the primacy legitimately exercises in the world today.

=== Catholic Church ===
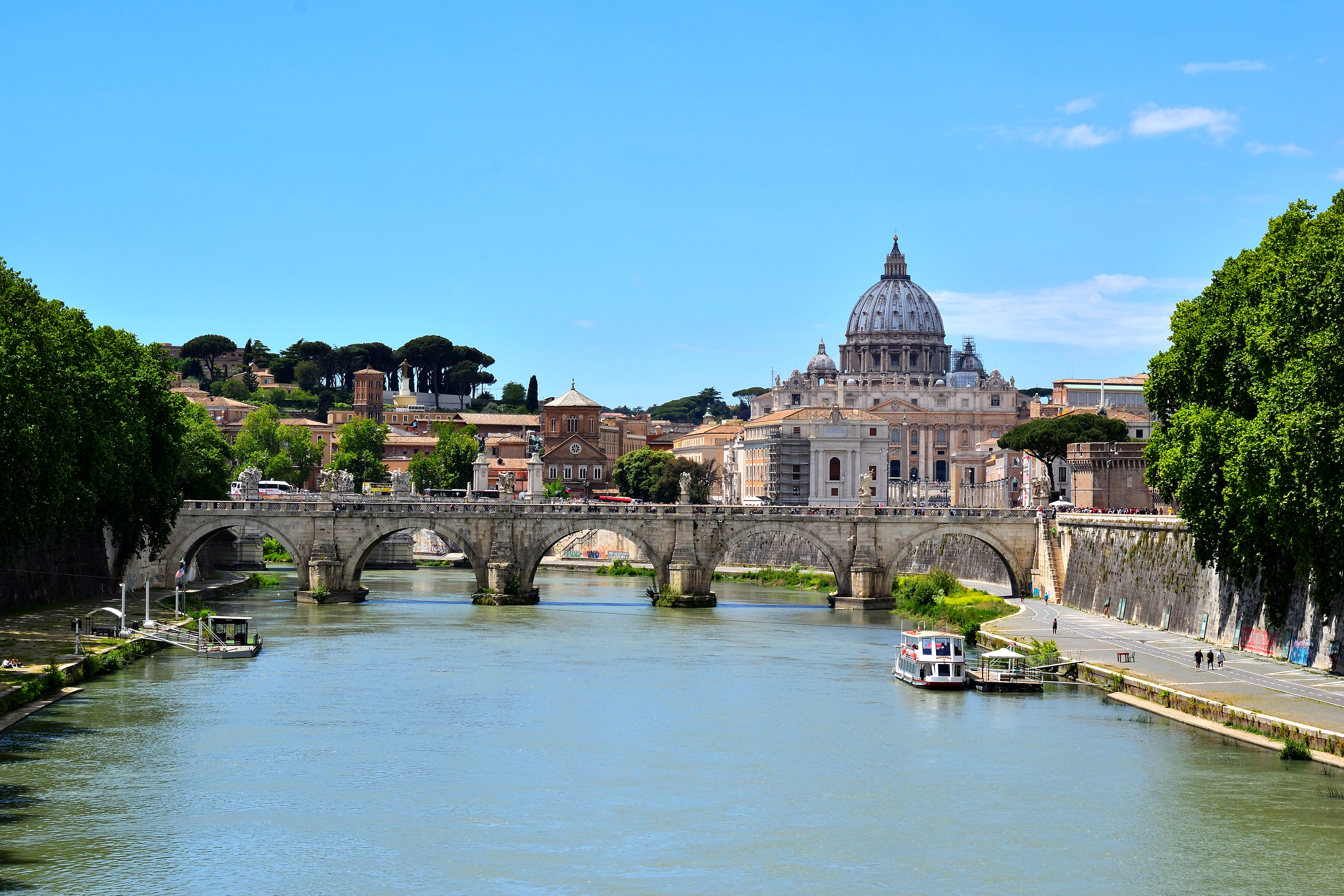
St. Peter's Basilica, believed to be the burial site of St. Peter, seen from the River Tiber. The iconic dome dominates the skyline of Rome.

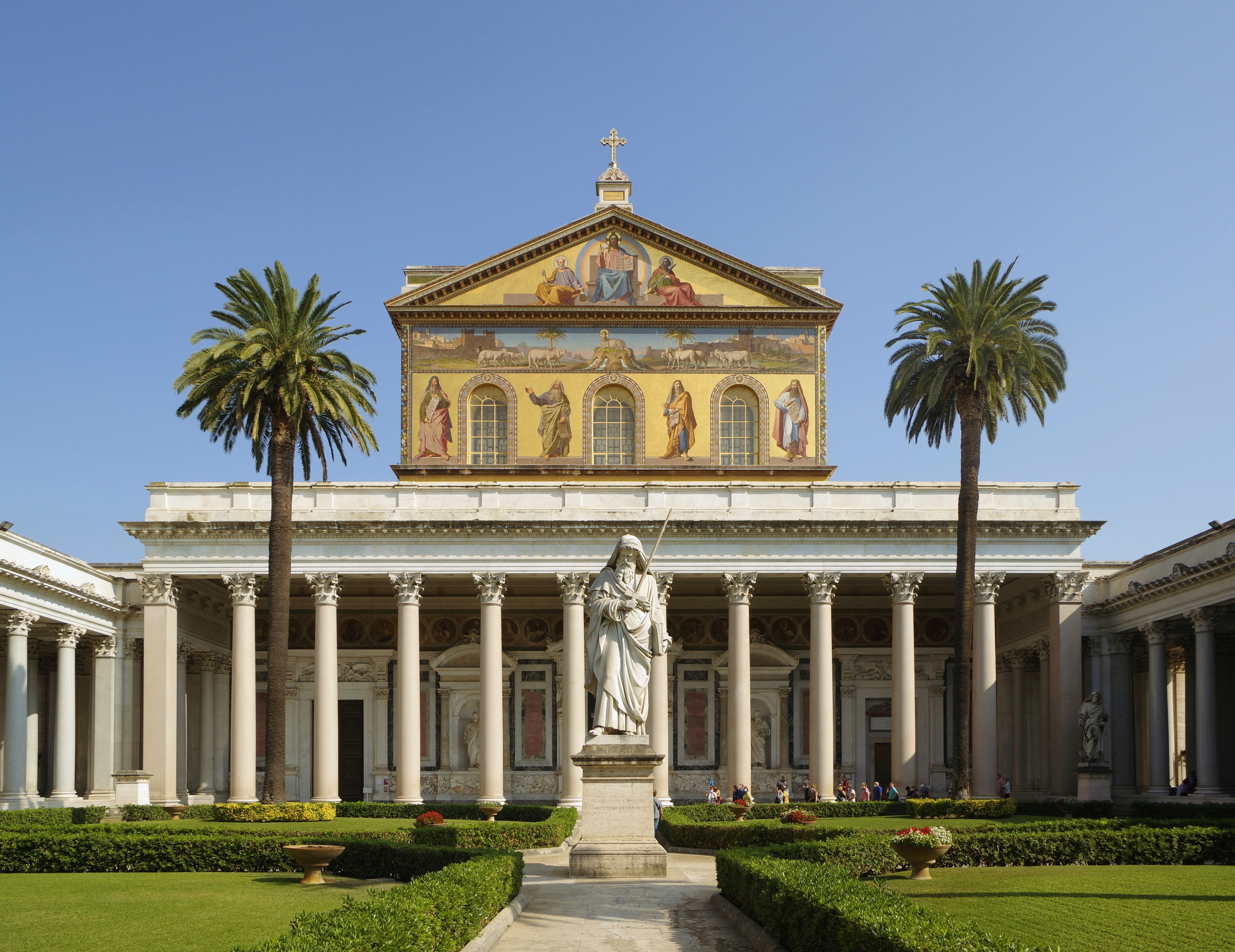
Basilica of Saint Paul Outside the Walls, believed to be the burial site of St. Paul.

The Catholic Church believes itself to be the continuation of the Christian community founded by Jesus in his consecration of Simon Peter. In the Catholic view, modern bishops are the successors to the apostles.

The See of Rome is traditionally said to be founded by Peter and Paul. While the New Testament says nothing directly about Peter's connection with Rome, indirectly Romans 15:20–22 may indicate that when Paul wrote it, another Apostle was already in Rome, and it is highly probable that the "Babylon" mentioned in 1 Peter 5:13, a letter attributed to Peter, is Rome. The tradition that links Peter with Rome is "early and unrivalled". In the first years of the 2nd century, Ignatius of Antioch implies that Peter and Paul had special authority over the Roman church. (Note: In his Epistle to the Romans, chapter 4:3, he told them he was not giving them orders like Peter and Paul (οὐχ ὡς Πέτρος καὶ Παῦλος διατάσσομαι ὑμῖν). The context of this phrase is, in Lightfoot's translation of 1891: 4:1 I write to all the churches, and I bid all men know, that of my own free will I die for God, unless ye should hinder me. I exhort you, be ye not an unseasonable kindness to me. Let me be given to the wild beasts, for through them I can attain unto God. I am God's wheat, and I am ground by the teeth of wild beasts that I may be found pure bread [of Christ]. 4:2 Rather entice the wild beasts, that they may become my sepulchre and may leave no part of my body behind, so that I may not, when I am fallen asleep, be burdensome to any one. Then shall I be truly a disciple of Jesus Christ, when the world shall not so much as see my body. Supplicate the Lord for me, that through these instruments I may be found a sacrifice to God. 4:3 I do not enjoin you, as Peter and Paul did. They were Apostles, I am a convict; they were free, but I am a slave to this very hour. Yet if I shall suffer, then am I a freed-man of Jesus Christ, and I shall rise free in Him. Now I am learning in my bonds to put away every desire.) Irenaeus of Lyons, also of the 2nd century, believed that Peter and Paul had been the founders of the Church in Rome and had appointed Linus as bishop. Dionysius of Corinth also serves as a witness to the tradition.

The traditional narrative starts with Peter being consecrated by Jesus, followed by Peter traveling to Rome sometime after Pentecost, founding a church there, serving as its first bishop and consecrating Linus as bishop, thus starting the line of Popes of whom Leo XIV is the current successor. This narrative is often related in histories of the Catholic Church.

Elements of this traditional narrative agree with the surviving historical evidence, which includes the writings of several early church Fathers (among them Pope Clement I) and some archaeological evidence. While some historians of Christianity assert that the Catholic Church can be traced to Jesus's consecration of Peter, others argue that Jesus did not found a church in his lifetime but provided a framework of beliefs. Other historians disagree with the traditional view that the papacy originated with Peter, instead asserting that the papal office developed at an unspecified date before the mid 150s and could possibly have been superimposed by the traditional narrative upon the primitive church.

The only part of this narrative that is supported directly by the Scriptures is the consecration of Peter; however, elements of the rest of the narrative are attested to in the writings of Church Fathers such as Ignatius, Irenaeus and Dionysius of Corinth. Largely as a result of a challenge to this narrative initiated by Alfred Loisy, some theologians have challenged the historicity of the traditional narrative, resulting in a less literal interpretation of the Church's "founding" by Jesus and less specific claims about the historical foundations and transmission of the Petrine primacy in the Church's early years. Some historians have also challenged the traditional narrative of Peter's role in the early Roman Church.

The New Testament offers no proof that Jesus established the Papacy nor that he established Peter as the first Bishop of Rome. The official documents of the Catholic Church do not apply to Peter the title "Bishop of Rome", applying it instead to the "successor of Peter", and presenting the Pope as Peter's successor in his relationship with the whole of the Catholic Church. However, some present the Church as linking Peter's primacy with his being bishop of Rome: Eamon Duffy says the official Catholic Church position is that Jesus had essentially appointed Peter as the first pope, with universal primacy as bishop of Rome. Some historians have challenged the view that Peter was bishop (as the term is now understood) of Rome.

While most scholars agree that Peter died in Rome, it is generally accepted that there was a Christian community in Rome before either Peter or Paul arrived there. The Catholic Church draws an analogy between Peter's seeming primacy among the Twelve in New Testament texts such as Matthew 16:17–19, Luke 22:32, and John 21:15–17 and the position of the Pope among the Church's bishops.

Two apostolic and patriarchal sees are claimed to have been founded by Peter: those of Antioch and Rome. With the see of Alexandria, see Coptic Pope, viewed as founded by a disciple of Peter, these formed what became known as the three Petrine Sees, endowed with special authority as recognized by the First Council of Nicaea.

== Apostolic Age ==
The apostolic period between the years 30 and 100 produced writings attributed to the direct followers of Jesus Christ. The period is traditionally associated with the apostles, apostolic times and apostolic writings. The New Testament books were connected by the early church to the apostles, though modern scholarship has cast doubt on the authorship of most New Testament books. In the traditional history of the Christian church, the Apostolic Age was the foundation upon which the entire church's history is founded.

The Apostolic Age is particularly significant to Restorationism which claims that it represents a purer form of Christianity that should be restored to the church as it exists today.

The unique character of the New Testament writings, and their period of origin, is highlighted by the paucity of the literary form in later writing. Once the canon of the New Testament began to take shape, the style ceased to be used on a regular basis. Noncanonical writings persisted, but died out within a historically short period of time. Early patristic literature is dominated by apologetics and makes use of other literary forms borrowed from non-Christian sources.

=== Peter and Paul ===
According to 19th-century German theologian F. C. Baur early Christianity was dominated by the conflict between Peter who was law observant and Paul who advocated partial or even complete freedom from the law. Later findings contradicted this theory. The allegedly continuous conflict was not supported by the available evidence. However, theological conflict between Paul and Peter is recorded in the New Testament and was widely discussed in the early church. Marcion and his followers stated that the polemic against false apostles in Galatians was aimed at Peter, James and John, the "Pillars of the Church", as well as the "false" gospels circulating through the churches at the time. Irenaeus and Tertullian argued against Marcionism's elevation of Paul and stated that Peter and Paul were equals among the apostles. Passages from Galatians were used to show that Paul respected Peter's office and acknowledged a shared faith.

=== Simon Peter ===
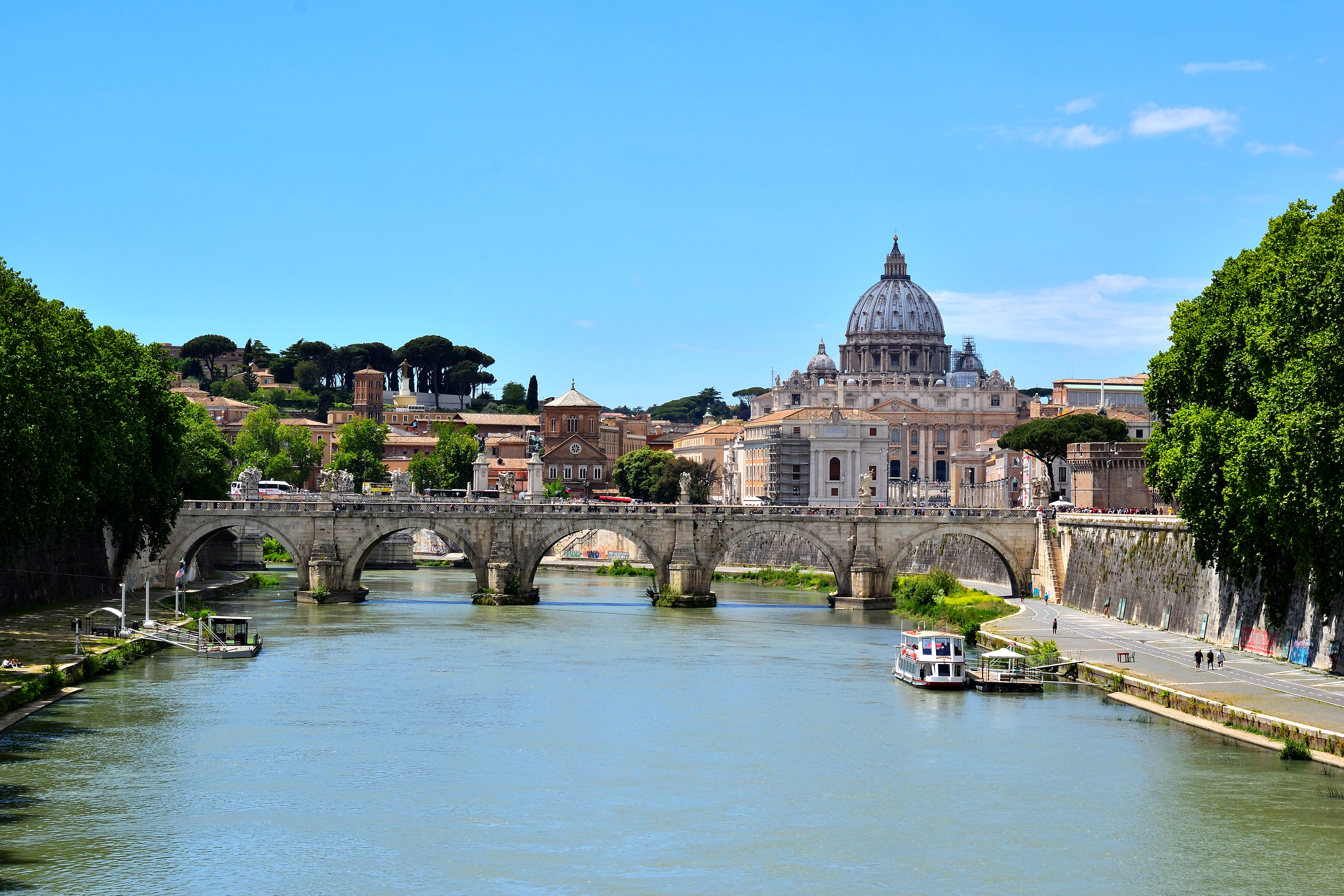
St. Peter's Basilica, believed to be the burial site of St. Peter, seen from the River Tiber. The iconic dome dominates the skyline of Rome.

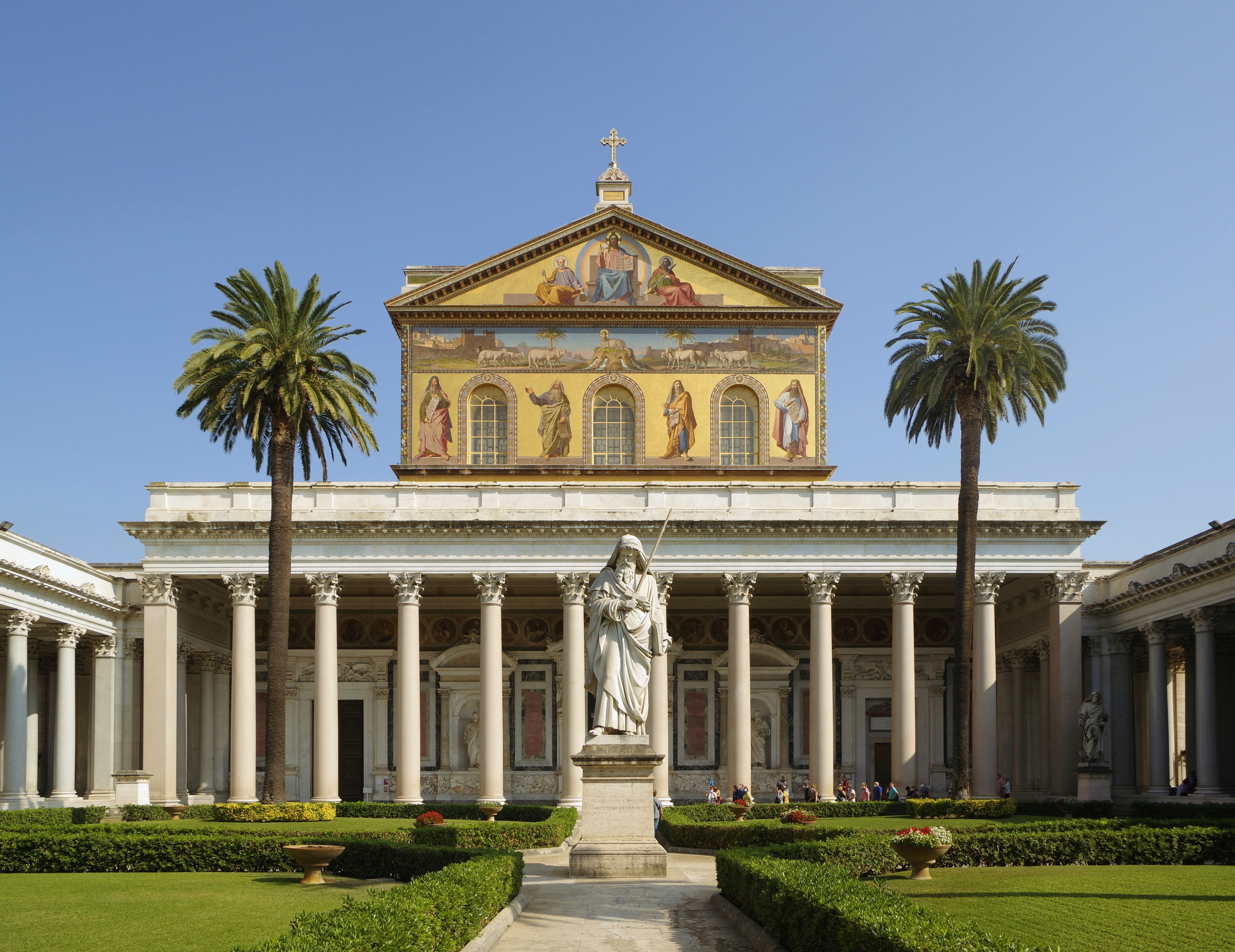
Basilica of Saint Paul Outside the Walls, believed to be the burial site of St. Paul.

James D. G. Dunn has proposed that Peter was the "bridge-man" between the two other prominent leaders: Paul and James the Just. Paul and James were both heavily identified with their own "brands" of Christianity. Peter showed a desire to hold onto his Jewish identity, in contrast with Paul. He simultaneously showed a flexibility towards the desires of the broader Christian community, in contrast to James. (This balance is illustrated in the Antioch episode related in Galatians 2.) Thus, Peter became a unifying force in the church.

The See of Rome is traditionally said to be founded by Peter and Paul, see also Primacy of Simon Peter, who had invested it with apostolic authority. The New Testament says nothing directly about Peter's connection to Rome, but an early Catholic tradition supports such a connection.

Most Catholic and Protestant scholars, and many scholars in general, conclude that Peter was indeed martyred in Rome under Nero. A 2009 critical study by Otto Zwierlein has concluded that "there is not a single piece of reliable literary evidence (and no archaeological evidence either) that Peter ever was in Rome."

1 Clement, a document that has been dated anywhere from the 90s to the 120s, is one of the earliest sources adduced in support of Peter's stay in Rome, but questions have been raised about the text's authenticity and whether it has any knowledge about Peter's life beyond what is contained in the New Testament Acts. The Letter to the Romans attributed to St. Ignatius of Antioch implies that Peter and Paul had special authority over the Roman church, telling the Roman Christians: "I do not command you, as Peter and Paul did" (ch. 4). However, the authenticity of this document and its traditional dating to c. 105–110 have also been questioned, and it may date from the final decades of the 2nd century.

Later in the 2nd century, Irenaeus of Lyons believed that Peter and Paul had been the founders of the Church in Rome and had appointed Linus as succeeding bishop.

Tertullian also writes: "But if you are near Italy, you have Rome, where authority is at hand for us too. What a happy church that is, on which the apostles poured out their whole doctrine with their blood; where Peter had a passion like that of the Lord, where Paul was crowned with the death of John (the Baptist, by being beheaded)." Dionysius of Corinth also serves as a late 2nd -century witness to the tradition. He wrote: "You (Pope Soter) have also, by your very admonition, brought together the planting that was made by Peter and Paul at Rome and at Corinth; for both of them alike planted in our Corinth and taught us; and both alike, teaching similarly in Italy, suffered martyrdom at the same time". Later tradition, first found in Saint Jerome, attributes to Peter a 25-year episcopate (or apostolate) in Rome.

Paul's Epistle to the Romans 16 (c. 58) attests to a large Christian community already there, although he does not mention Peter.

=== Paul of Tarsus ===
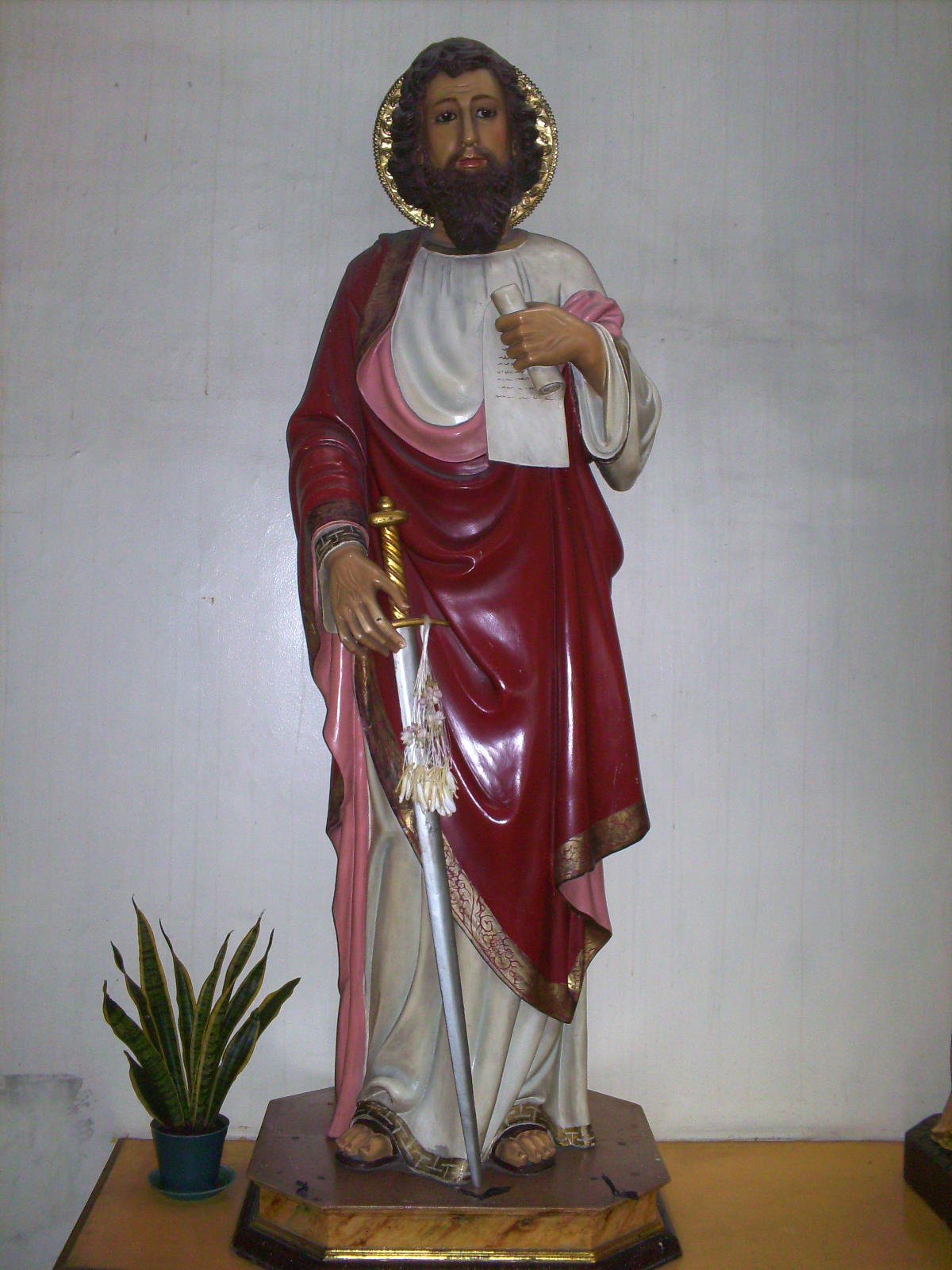
A statue of Paul holding a scroll (symbolising the Scriptures) and the sword (perhaps symbolising his martyrdom)

Elaine Pagels, professor of religion at Princeton and an authority on Gnosticism, argues that Paul was a Gnostic and that the anti-Gnostic Pastoral Epistles were "pseudo-Pauline" forgeries written to rebut this.

British Jewish scholar Hyam Maccoby contends that the Paul as described in the Book of Acts and the view of Paul gleaned from his own writings are very different people. Some difficulties have been noted in the account of his life. Paul as described in the Book of Acts is much more interested in factual history, less in theology; ideas such as justification by faith are absent as are references to the Spirit, according to Maccoby. He also points out that there are no references to John the Baptist in the Pauline Epistles, although Paul mentions him several times in the Book of Acts.

Others have objected that the language of the speeches is too Lukan in style to reflect anyone else's words. Moreover, some have argued that the speeches of Peter and Paul are too much alike, and that especially Paul's are too distinct from his letters to reflect a true Pauline source. Despite these suspicions, historian-attorney Christopher Price concludes that Luke's style in Acts is representative of those ancient historians known for accurately recording speeches in their works. Examination of several of the major speeches in Acts reveals that while the author smoothed out the Greek in some cases, he clearly relied on preexisting material to reconstruct his speeches. He did not believe himself at liberty to invent material, but attempted to accurately record the reality of the speeches in Acts.

F. C. Baur (1792–1860), professor of theology at Tübingen in Germany, the first scholar to critique Acts and the Pauline Epistles, and founder of the Tübingen School of theology, argued that Paul, as the "Apostle to the Gentiles", was in violent opposition to the original 12 Apostles. Baur considers the Acts of the Apostles were late and unreliable. This debate has continued ever since, with Adolf Deissmann (1866–1937) and Richard Reitzenstein (1861–1931) emphasising Paul's Greek inheritance and Albert Schweitzer stressing his dependence on Judaism.

Maccoby theorizes that Paul synthesized Judaism, Gnosticism, and mysticism to create Christianity as a cosmic savior religion. According to Maccoby, Paul's Pharisaism was his own invention, though actually he was probably associated with the Sadducees. Maccoby attributes the origins of Christian anti-Semitism to Paul and claims that Paul's view of women, though inconsistent, reflects his Gnosticism in its misogynist aspects.

== Post-apostolic period ==
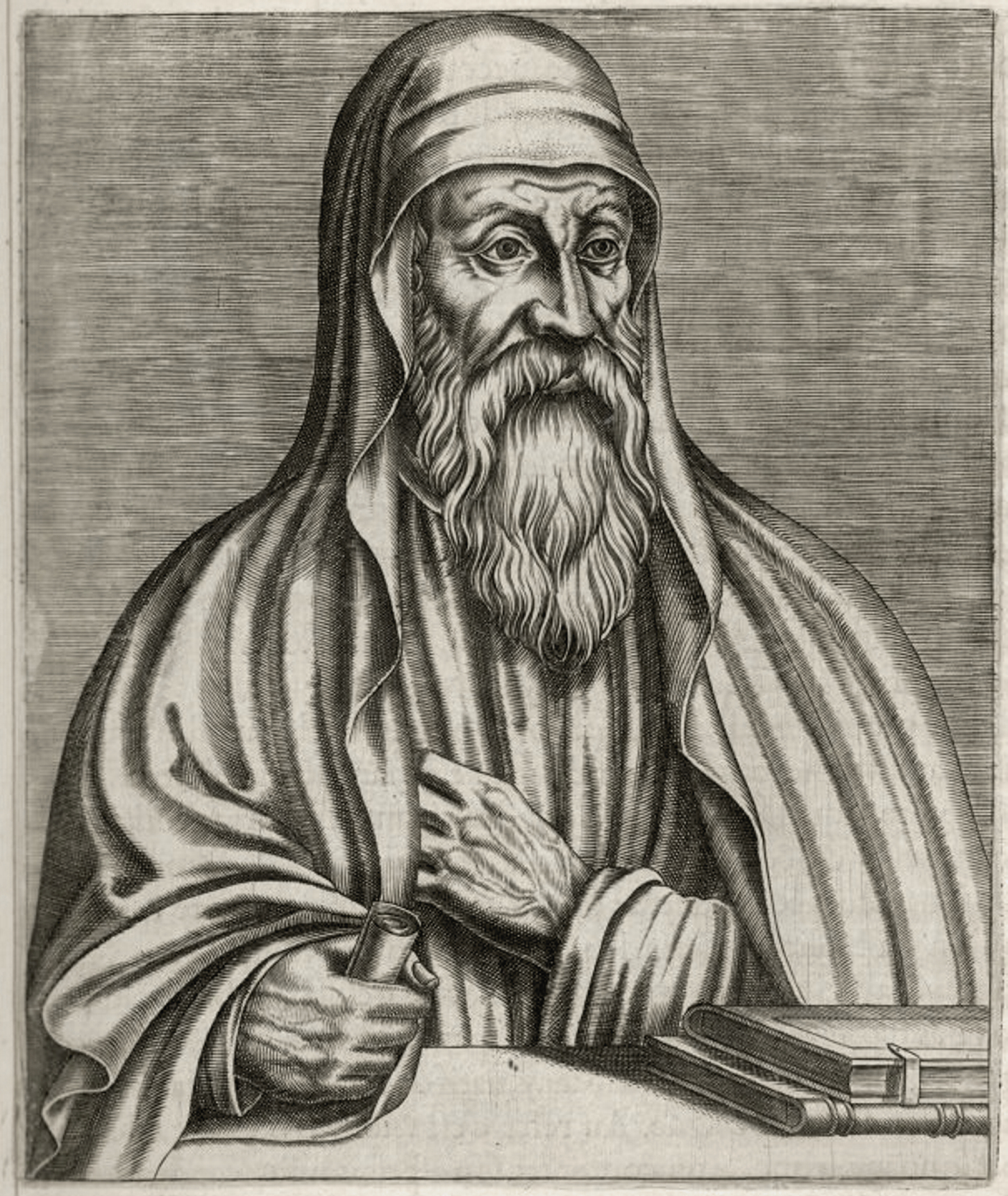
Origen, one of the Ante-Nicene Fathers.

Christianity throughout the 2nd and 3rd centuries has generally been less studied than in the periods that came before and after it. This is reflected in that it is usually referred to in terms of the adjacent periods with names as such "post-apostolic" (after the period of 1st century formative Christianity) and "ante-Nicene" (before the First Council of Nicaea). However, the 2nd and 3rd centuries are quite important in the development of Christianity.

There is a relative lack of material for this period, compared with the later Church Father period. For example, a widely used collection (Ante-Nicene Fathers) includes most 2nd- and 3rd-century writings in nine volumes. This includes the writings of the Apostolic Fathers, Apologists, Clement of Alexandria, Irenaeus of Lyons, Origen of Alexandria and the New Testament Apocrypha, among others. In contrast, Nicene and Post-Nicene Fathers (consisting mainly of Augustine, Jerome and Chrysostom) fills twenty-eight volumes.

According to Siker the developments of this time are "multidirectional and not easily mapped". While the preceding and following periods were diverse, they possessed unifying characteristics lacking in this period. 1st-century Christianity possessed a basic cohesion based on the Pauline church movement, Jewish character, and self-identification as a messianic movement. The 2nd and 3rd centuries saw a sharp divorce from its early roots. There was an explicit rejection of then-modern Judaism and Jewish culture by the end of the 2nd century, with a growing body of adversus Judaeos literature. Christianity in the 4th and 5th centuries experienced imperial pressure and developed strong episcopal and unifying structure. The ante-Nicene period was without such authority and immensely diverse. Many variations in this time defy neat categorizations, as various forms of Christianity interacted in a complex fashion to form the dynamic character of Christianity in this era.

By the early 2nd century, Christians had agreed on a basic list of writings that would serve as their canon, see Development of the New Testament canon, but interpretations of these works differed, often wildly. In part to ensure a greater consistency in their teachings, by the end of the 1st century many Christian communities evolved a more structured hierarchy, with a central bishop, whose opinion held more weight in that city. By 160, most communities had a bishop, who based his authority on the chain of succession from the apostles to himself.

Bishops still had a freedom of interpretation. The competing versions of Christianity led many bishops who subscribed to what is now the mainstream version of Christianity to rally more closely together. Bishops would call synods to discuss problems or doctrinal differences in certain regions; the first of these to be documented occurred in Roman Asia in about 160. Some bishops began to take on a more authoritative role for a region; in many cases, the bishop of the church located in the capital city of a province became the central authority for all churches in that province. These more centralized authorities were known as metropolitan churches headed by a Metropolitan bishop. The churches in Antioch, Alexandria, and Rome exerted authority over groups of these metropolitan churches.

=== Church Fathers ===
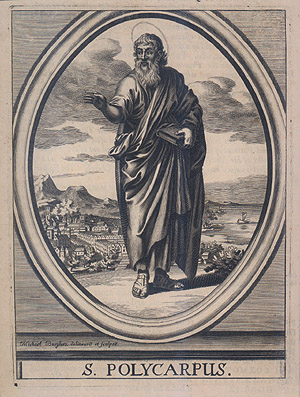
St. Polycarp, depicted with a book as a symbol of his writings.

The church fathers are generally divided into the Ante-Nicene Fathers, those who lived and wrote before the Council of Nicaea (325) and the Nicene and Post-Nicene Fathers, those who lived and wrote after 325. In addition, the division of the fathers into Greek and Latin writers is also common. Some of the most prominent Greek Fathers are Justin Martyr, John Chrysostom, and Cyril of Alexandria. Among the Latin Fathers are Tertullian, Cyprian, Jerome, Ambrose of Milan, Gregory the Great and Augustine of Hippo.

=== Apostolic Fathers ===
The earliest Church Fathers (within two generations of the Apostles of Christ) are usually called the Apostolic Fathers. Important Apostolic Fathers include Clement of Rome, Ignatius of Antioch and Polycarp of Smyrna. In addition, the Didache and Shepherd of Hermas are usually placed among the writings of the Apostolic Fathers although their authors are unknown.

== Eusebius of Caesarea ==
The Church History (Latin: Historia Ecclesiastica or Historia Ecclesiae) of Eusebius of Caesarea was a 4th-century pioneer work giving a chronological account of the development of Early Christianity from the 1st century. It was written in Koine Greek, and survives also in Latin, Syriac and Armenian manuscripts. The result was the first full-length historical narrative written from a Christian point of view. In the early 5th century two advocates in Constantinople, Socrates Scholasticus and Sozomen, and a bishop, Theodoret of Cyrrhus, Syria, wrote continuations of Eusebius' church history, establishing the convention of continuators that would determine to a great extent the way history was written for the next thousand years. Eusebius' Chronicle, that attempted to lay out a comparative timeline of pagan and Old Testament history, set the model for the other historiographical genre, the medieval chronicle or universal history.

Eusebius made use of many ecclesiastical monuments and documents, acts of the martyrs, letters, extracts from earlier Christian writings, lists of bishops, and similar sources, often quoting the originals at great length so that his work contains materials not elsewhere preserved. For example, he wrote that Matthew composed the Gospel according to the Hebrews and his Church Catalogue suggests that it was the only Jewish gospel. It is therefore of historical value, though it pretends neither to completeness nor to the observance of due proportion in the treatment of the subject-matter. Nor does it present in a connected and systematic way the history of the early Christian Church. It is to no small extent a vindication of the Christian religion, though the author did not primarily intend it as such. Eusebius has been often accused of intentional falsification of the truth; in judging persons or facts he is not entirely unbiased.

== Reformation ==
Some of the new words and phrases introduced by William Tyndale in his translation of the Bible did not sit well with the hierarchy of the Roman Catholic Church, using words like 'Overseer' rather than 'Bishop' and 'Elder' rather than 'Priest', and (very controversially), 'congregation' rather than 'Church' and 'love' rather than 'charity'. Tyndale contended (citing Erasmus) that the Greek New Testament did not support the traditional Roman Catholic readings.

Contention from Roman Catholics came not only from real or perceived errors in translation but a fear of the erosion of their social power if Christians could read the bible in their own language "the Pope's dogma is bloody" Tyndale wrote in his The Obedience of a Christian Man. Tyndale translated "Church" as "congregation" and translated "priest" as "elder." Moynahan explains Tyndale's reasons for this: "This was a direct threat to the Church's ancient- but so Tyndale here made clear, non-scriptural- claim to be the body of Christ on earth. To change these words was to strip the Church hierarchy of its pretensions to be Christ's terrestrial representative, and to award this honour to individual worshipers who made up each congregation."

== Modern perspectives ==
=== Historicity of the Acts of the Apostles ===
The historical reliability of the Acts of the Apostles, the primary source for the Apostolic Age, is a major issue for biblical scholars and historians of early Christianity. While some biblical scholars and historians view the book of Acts as being extremely accurate and corroborated by archaeology, others view the work as being inaccurate and in conflict with the Pauline epistles. Acts portrays Paul as more inline with Jewish Christianity, while the Pauline epistles record more conflict, such as the Incident at Antioch.

=== Orthodoxy and heterodoxy ===
Traditionally, orthodoxy and heresy have been viewed in relation to the "orthodoxy" as an authentic lineage of tradition. Other forms of Christianity were viewed as deviant streams of thought and therefore "heterodox", or heretical. This view was dominant until the publication of Walter Bauer's Rechtgläubigkeit und Ketzerei im ältesten Christentum ("Orthodoxy and Heresy in Earliest Christianity") in 1934. Bauer endeavored to rethink early Christianity historically, independent from the views of the church. He stated that the 2nd-century church was very diverse and included many "heretical" groups that had an equal claim to apostolic tradition. Bauer interpreted the struggle between the orthodox and heterodox to be the "mainstream" Roman church struggling to attain dominance. He presented Edessa and Egypt as places where the "orthodoxy" of Rome had little influence during the 2nd century. As he saw it, the theological thought of the Orient at the time would later be labeled "heresy". The response by modern scholars has been mixed. Some scholars clearly support Bauer's conclusions and others express concerns about his "attacking [of] orthodox sources with inquisitional zeal and exploiting to a nearly absurd extent the argument from silence." However, modern scholars have critiqued and updated Bauer's model. For example, subsequent analysis of Bauer's geographical model have generally fallen against Bauer such as in Egypt.

Perhaps one of the most important discussions among scholars of early Christianity in the past century is to what extent it is appropriate to speak of "orthodoxy" and "heresy". Higher criticism drastically altered the previous perception that heresy was a very rare exception to the orthodoxy. Bauer was particularly influential in the reconsideration of the historical model. During the 1970s, increasing focus on the effect of social, political and economic circumstances on the formation of early Christianity occurred as Bauer's work found a wider audience. Some scholars argue against the increasing focus on heresies. A movement away from presuming the correctness or dominance of the orthodoxy is seen as understandable, in light of modern approaches. However, they feel that instead of an even and neutral approach to historical analysis that the heterodox sects are given an assumption of superiority over the orthodox movement. The current debate is vigorous and broad. While it is difficult to summarize all current views, general statements may be made, remembering that such broad strokes will have exceptions in specific cases.

In his Rechtgläubigkeit und Ketzerei im ältesten Christentum (Tübingen 1934; a second edition, edited by Georg Strecker, Tübingen 1964, was translated as Orthodoxy and Heresy in Earliest Christianity 1971), Walter Bauer developed his thesis that in earliest Christianity, orthodoxy and heresy do not stand in relation to one another as primary to secondary, but in many regions heresy is the original manifestation of Christianity. Bauer reassessed as a historian the overwhelmingly dominant view that for the period of Christian origins, ecclesiastical doctrine already represented what is primary, while heresies, on the other hand somehow are a deviation from the genuine (Bauer, "Introduction").

Through studies of historical records Bauer concluded that what came to be known as orthodoxy was just one of numerous forms of Christianity in the early centuries. It was the form of Christianity practiced in Rome that exercised the uniquely dominant influence over the development of orthodoxy and acquired the majority of converts over time. This was largely due to the greater resources available to the Christians in Rome and due to the conversion to Christianity of the Roman Emperor Constantine I. Practitioners of what became orthodoxy then rewrote the history of the conflict making it appear that this view had always been the majority one. Writings in support of other views were systematically destroyed.

Bauer's conclusions contradicted nearly 1600 years of writing on church history and thus were met with much skepticism among Christian academics such as Walther Völker (see below).

The cultural isolation of Nazi Germany precluded a wider dissemination of Bauer's ideas until after World War II; in the international field of biblical scholarship, Bauer continued to be known solely as the compiler of the monumental Wörterbuch zu den Schriften des Neuen Testaments (in its English translation A Greek-English Lexicon of the New Testament and Other Early Christian Literature or simply the Bauer lexicon), which has become standard. Rechtgläubigkeit und Ketzerei was finally translated into English in 1970 and published in 1971.

Bart Ehrman has written widely on issues of New Testament and early Christianity at both an academic and popular level, with over twenty books including three New York Times bestsellers (Misquoting Jesus, God's Problem, and Jesus, Interrupted). Much of his work is on textual criticism and the New Testament. His first book was Didymus the Blind and the Text of the Gospels (1987) followed by several books published by the Oxford University Press, including The Orthodox Corruption of Scripture, and a new edition and translation of The Apostolic Fathers in the Loeb Classical Library series published by Harvard University Press. His most recent book Jesus, Interrupted was published in March 2009 and discusses contradictions in the Bible.

In 1999 Jesus: Apocalyptic Prophet of the New Millennium was released as a study on the historical Jesus. Ehrman argues that the historical Jesus was an apocalyptic preacher, and that his apocalyptic beliefs are recorded in the earliest Christian documents: the Gospel of Mark and the authentic Pauline epistles. The earliest Christians believed Jesus would soon return, and their beliefs are echoed in the earliest Christian writings.

Much of Ehrman's writing has concentrated on various aspects of Walter Bauer's thesis that Christianity was always diversified or at odds with itself. Ehrman is often considered a pioneer in connecting the history of the early church to textual variants within biblical manuscripts and in coining such terms as "Proto-orthodox Christianity." Ehrman brought this thesis, and textual criticism in general, through his popular level work Misquoting Jesus.

== Sources ==
- Arnal, William Edward; Desjardins, Michel Robert, eds. (1997), Whose historical Jesus?, Studies in Christianity and Judaism, Wilfrid Laurier University Press, ISBN 978-0-88920-295-5
- Barry, Rev. Msgr. John F (2001). One Faith, One Lord: A Study of Basic Catholic Belief. Nihil obstat, Imprimatur. Gerard F. Baumbach, Ed.D. ISBN 0-8215-2207-8.
- Bokenkotter, Thomas (2004). A Concise History of the Catholic Church. Doubleday. ISBN 0-385-50584-1.
- Brabazon, James (2000), Albert Schweitzer: a biography, Syracuse University Press
- Bromiley, Geoffrey W. (1988), The International standard Bible Encyclopedia, Wm. B. Eerdmans Publishing, ISBN 978-0-8028-3785-1
- Brown, Raymond E.; Meier, John P. (1993), Antioch and Rome: New Testament Cradles of Christianity, Paulist Press
- Brown (1997), Introduction to the New Testament, Anchor Bible
- Bruce, FF (1982), New Testament Documents: Are They Reliable, InterVarsity Press, ISBN 0-87784-691-X
- Brunt, P.A. (1990), Roman imperial themes, Oxford University Press, ISBN 978-0-19-814476-2
- Chadwick, Henry (1993), The Early Church, Penguin Books
- Chadwick, Owen (1995), A History of Christianity, New York: St. Martin's Press, ISBN 0-312-13807-5
- Chesnut, Glenn F. (1986), The First Christian Histories: Eusebius, Socrates, Sozomen, Theodoret, and Evagrius
- Crossan, John Dominic (1998), The essential Jesus, Castle Books
- Crossan, John Dominic; Watts, Richard G. (1999), Who is Jesus? Answers to your questions about the historical Jesus, Westminster John Knox Press
- Cullmann, Oscar (1962), Peter: Disciple, Apostle, Martyr (2 ed.), Westminster Press
- Davies, Philip R. (2002), "The Jewish Scriptural Canon in Cultural Perspective", in McDonald, Lee Martin; Sanders, James A. (eds.), The Canon Debate, Hendrickson Publishers, ISBN 978-1-56563-517-3
- Duffy, Eamon (1997). Saints and Sinners, a History of the Popes. Yale University Press. ISBN 0-300-07332-1.
- Dunn, D.G. (2003), Jesus Remembered, Christianity in the Making, Eerdmans Publishing, ISBN 978-0-8028-3931-2
- Dunn, J.G.D. (1998), The Christ and the Spirit, Volume I: Christology, Eerdmans / T&T Clark
- Dupuis, C.F. (1984), The Origin of All Religious Worship, Garland translation of Origine de tous les cultes, published by Chasseriau in 1794.
- Durant, Will (1972), Caesar and Christ, Simon and Schuster
- Edmunds, Rev. John (1855), The seven sayings of Christ on the cross, Thomas Hatchford Publishers
- Ehrman, Bart (2003), Lost Christianities, New York: Oxford University Press
- Eisenman, Robert (1997), James Brother of Jesus: The Key to Unlocking the Secrets of Early Christianity and the Dead Sea Scrolls, Viking Penguin
- France, R.T. (1986), The Evidence for Jesus
- Grudem, Wayne (1994), Systematic Theology, Inter-Varsity Press
- Guignebert, C. (1956), Jesus, University Books translated by S.H. Hooke
- Habermas, Gary R. (1996), The historical Jesus: ancient evidence for the life of Christ, College Press, ISBN 978-0-89900-732-8
- Harris, Stephen (1985), Understanding the Bible, Mayfield Pub., ISBN 978-0-87484-696-6
- Herzog, WR II (2005), Prophet and Teacher, WJK, ISBN 0-664-22528-4
- Houlden, James Leslie, Jesus in history, thought, and culture: an enxyclopedia, Volume 2
- Kelly, J.N.D. (1996), Oxford Dictionary of the Popes, Oxford University Press
- Küng, Hans (2004), Islam, Past, Present and Future, One World Press
- Lindars, Barnabas (1990), John, Sheffield Academic Press
- MacCulloch, Diarmaid (2010). A History of Christianity: The First Three Thousand Years.
- Mannion, Gerard; Gaillardetz, Richard; Kerkhofs, Jan (2003), Readings in Church Authority: Gifts and Challenges for Contemporary Catholicism, Ashgate Publishing
- Marshall, Howard (2004), I Believe in the Historical Jesus, Regent College Publishing, ISBN 1-57383-019-4
- McKnight, Scot (1996), "Who is Jesus? An Introduction to Jesus Studies", in Wilkins, Michael J.; Moreland, J P (eds.), Jesus Under Fire, Zondervan, ISBN 0-310-21139-5
- Meier, John P. (1991), A Marginal Jew: Rethinking the Historical Jesus, vol. 1, Doubleday
- Meyer, Marvin; Robinson, James M. (2007), The Nag Hammadi Scriptures: The International Edition, HarperOne, ISBN 978-0-06-052378-7
- Moynahan, Brian (2003), William Tyndale. If God Spare my Life, Abacus, ISBN 978-0-349-11532-0
- Murphy, Catherine M. (2007), The Historical Jesus for Dummies, For Dummies Pub.
- Newton, Francis (1999), "The Date of the Midecean Tacitus", The Scriptorium and Library at Monte Cassino, 1058–1105, Cambridge University Press
- O'Grady, John (1997), The Roman Catholic church: its origins and nature
- Orlandis, Jose (1993). A Short History of the Catholic Church. Scepter Publishers. ISBN 1-85182-125-2. translated by Michael Adams in 1985 from Historia breve del Cristianismo, published 1983 by Ediciones Rialp, S.A. in Madrid.
- Pagels, Elaine (1989), The Gnostic Gospels, Vintage Publishers
- Powell, Mark Allan (1998), Jesus as a figure in history: how modern historians view the man from Galilee, Louisville, Ky.: Westminster John Knox Press, ISBN 978-0-664-25703-3
- Robinson, James M. (1988), The Nag Hammadi Library in English (3 ed.), Harper-Collins, ISBN 978-0-06-066934-8
- Robinson, John A.T. (1977), Redating the New Testament, SCM Press, ISBN 978-0-334-02300-5
- Sanders, E.P. (1993), The Historical Figure of Jesus, Penguin
- Stagg, Evelyn; Stagg, Frank (1978), Woman in the World of Jesus, Westminster Press, ISBN 0-664-24195-6
- Theissen, Gerd; Merz, Annette (1998), The historical Jesus: a comprehensive guide, Fortress Press
- Thompson, Marianne Maye (2006). "The Gospel according to John". In Stephen C. Barton (ed.). The Cambridge Companion to the Gospels. Cambridge University Press. ISBN 978-0-521-80766-1.
- Thompson, Marianne Maye (1996), "The Historical Jesus and the Johannine Christ", in Culpepper, R. Alan; Black, C. Clifron (eds.), Exploring the Gospel of John, Westminster John Knox Press
- Van Roo, William A. (1982), Basics of Roman Catholic theology, Facultatis Theologiae, Editrice Pontificia Università Gregoriana
- Van Voorst, Robert E. (2000), Jesus outside the New Testament: an introduction to the ancient evidence, Grand Rapids, Mich.: W.B. Eerdmans, ISBN 978-0-8028-4368-5
- Vermes, Geza (2004), The authentic gospel of Jesus, Penguin Books
- Volney, Constantin-François (1796), The Ruins, or a Survey of the Revolutions of Empire, Davis translated from Les ruines, ou Méditations sur les révolutions des empires, published by Desenne in 1791.
- Wansbrough, Henry (2001), The Four Gospels in Synopsis, The Oxford Bible Commentary, Oxford University Press, ISBN 0-19-875500-7
- Weaver, Walter P. (1999), The historical Jesus in the twentieth century, Harrisburg, Pa.: Trinity Press International, ISBN 978-1-56338-280-2
