= Teresa Lodi =

Italian librarian (1889–1971)

Teresa Lodi (Ferrara, 13 June 1889 – Ancona, 7 April 1971) was an Italian librarian and papyrologist.

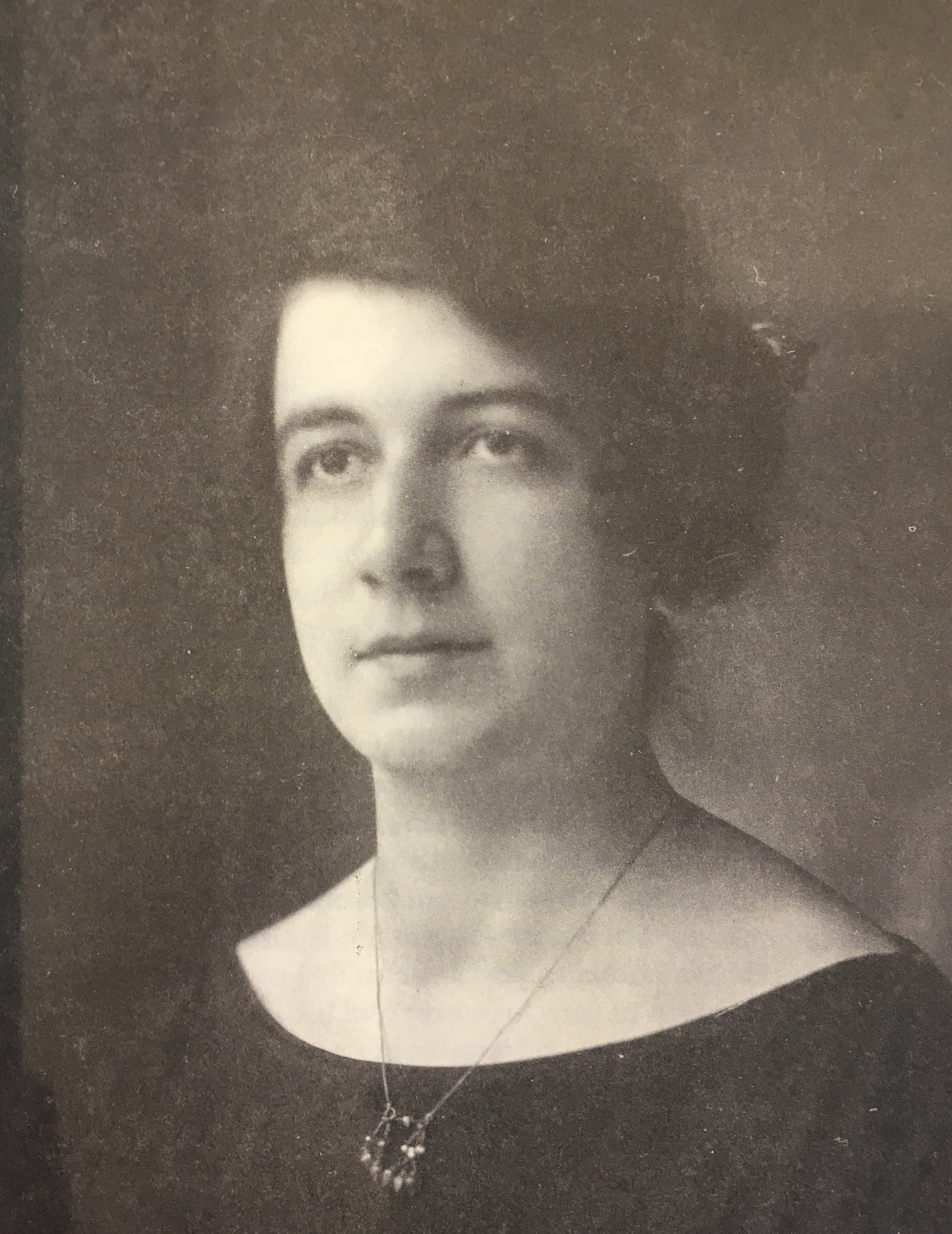
Teresa Lodi

== Career ==
Lodi studied with Girolamo Vitelli, the founder of Italian papyrology, at the Istituto di Studi Superiori di Firenze (later the University of Florence), graduating in 1911. In April 1913 she joined the National Central Library of Florence as assistant librarian, working with manuscripts and rare books. In May 1924 she was promoted to librarian and from June 1926 chief librarian.

In 1933 Lodi was appointed director of the Biblioteca Medicea-Laurenziana, a position she held until her retirement in 1955. Lodi curated many exhibitions at the library, including on the library of Lorenzo the Magnificent (1949), on papyrology (1950), on da Vinci's drawings and manuscripts (1952), and on Poliziano (1954). Lodi was president of the Associazione italiana biblioteche^{[IT]} from 1946 until 1951.

Her correspondence is held in the Laurentian library.

== Publications ==
- Lodi, T. (1927). Catalogo della mostra storica del libro illustrato in palazzo vecchio a firenze Istituto Italiano del Libro.
- Lodi T. (1929). Lettere di alessandro manzoni a niccolò tommeseo.
- Lodi T. & Rostagno E. (1948). I codici ashburnhamiani della r. biblioteca mediceo-laurenziana di firenze. 1.6. La libreria dello Stato.
- Lodi T. (1949). La vera storia di un presunto cimelio cinquecentesco: il cosidetto torchio della tipografia medicea orientale. Fratelli Palombi.
- Lodi, T. & Biscioni A. M. (1956). Un bibliotecario faceto. antommaria biscioni nel secondo centenario della morte 1756-1956.
- Lodi, T. (1961). Il «Catalogus Scriptorum Florentinorum» di Giambattista Doni. La Bibliofilía, 63(2), 125–156.
